= Weroth =

- Municipality
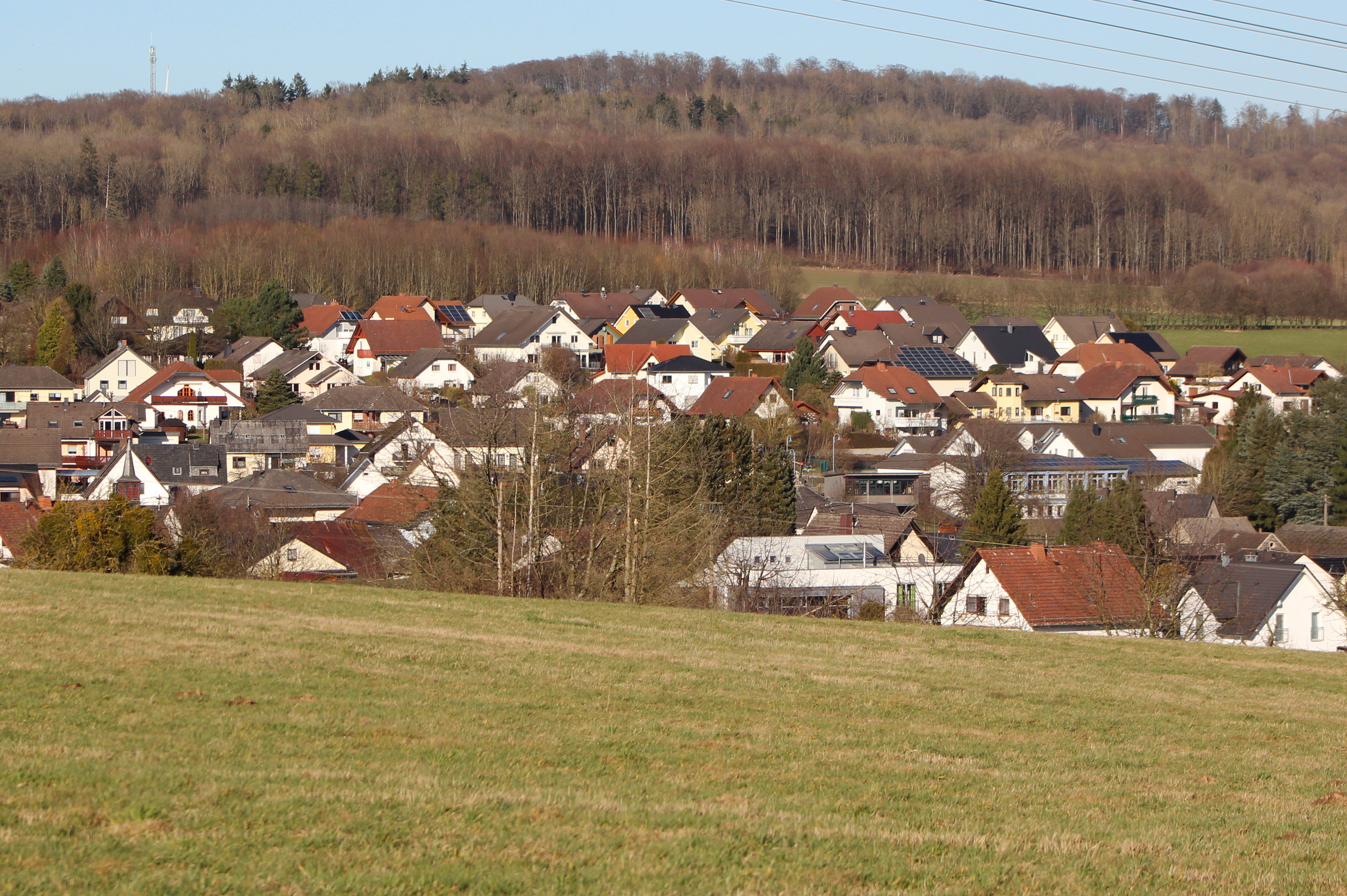

- Coat of arms

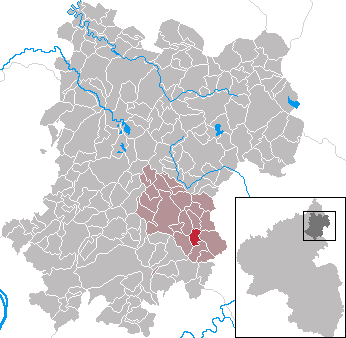
- Location of Weroth within Westerwaldkreis district
- Interactive map of Weroth
- Location within Germany Location within Rhineland-Palatinate
- Coordinates: 50°27′37″N 7°56′52″E
- Country: Germany
- State: Rhineland-Palatinate
- District: Westerwaldkreis
- Municipal assoc.: Wallmerod

Government
  - Mayor (2019–24): Achim Kremer

Area
  - Total: 2.52 km^{2} (0.97 sq mi)
- Elevation: 290 m (950 ft)

Population (2025-12-31)
  - Total: 552
  - Density: 219/km^{2} (567/sq mi)
- Time zone: UTC+01:00 (CET)
  - Summer (DST): UTC+02:00 (CEST)
- Postal codes: 56414
- Dialling codes: 06435
- Vehicle registration: WW
- Website: www.weroth.de

Weroth is an Ortsgemeinde – a community belonging to a Verbandsgemeinde – in the Westerwaldkreis in Rhineland-Palatinate, Germany.

== Geography ==
=== Location ===
The community lies in the Westerwald between Montabaur and Limburg an der Lahn. Weroth lies 290 m above sea level. It belongs to the Verbandsgemeinde of Wallmerod, a kind of collective municipality. Its seat is in the like-named town.

=== Neighbouring communities ===
Weroth's neighbours are Hundsangen, Wallmerod, Dreikirchen and Steinefrenz.

== History ==
In 1322, Weroth had its first documentary mention.

== Politics ==
The municipal council is made up of 11 council members who were elected in a majority vote in a municipal election on 13 June 2004.

== Economy and infrastructure ==
Weroth's access to the public local transport is through the bus lines 481, 482,492, 959 and 994. Weroth is located in the area of the transport association Verkehrsverbund Rhein-Mosel (VRM), zone number 410. Right nearby to the community's north runs Bundesstraße 8, leading from Limburg an der Lahn to Hennef. The nearest Autobahn interchange is Diez on the A 3 (Cologne–Frankfurt), some 4 km away. The nearest InterCityExpress stop is the railway station at Montabaur on the Cologne-Frankfurt high-speed rail line.

== Regular events ==
Saint Sebastian’s Day on 20 January is to this day still a holiday in Weroth, as the community was spared a Plague epidemic.

Likewise held every year is the Live-Rock-Festival at the Bürgerhaus on Kirmesfreitag (“Kermis Friday”)
