= Hundsangen =

- Municipality
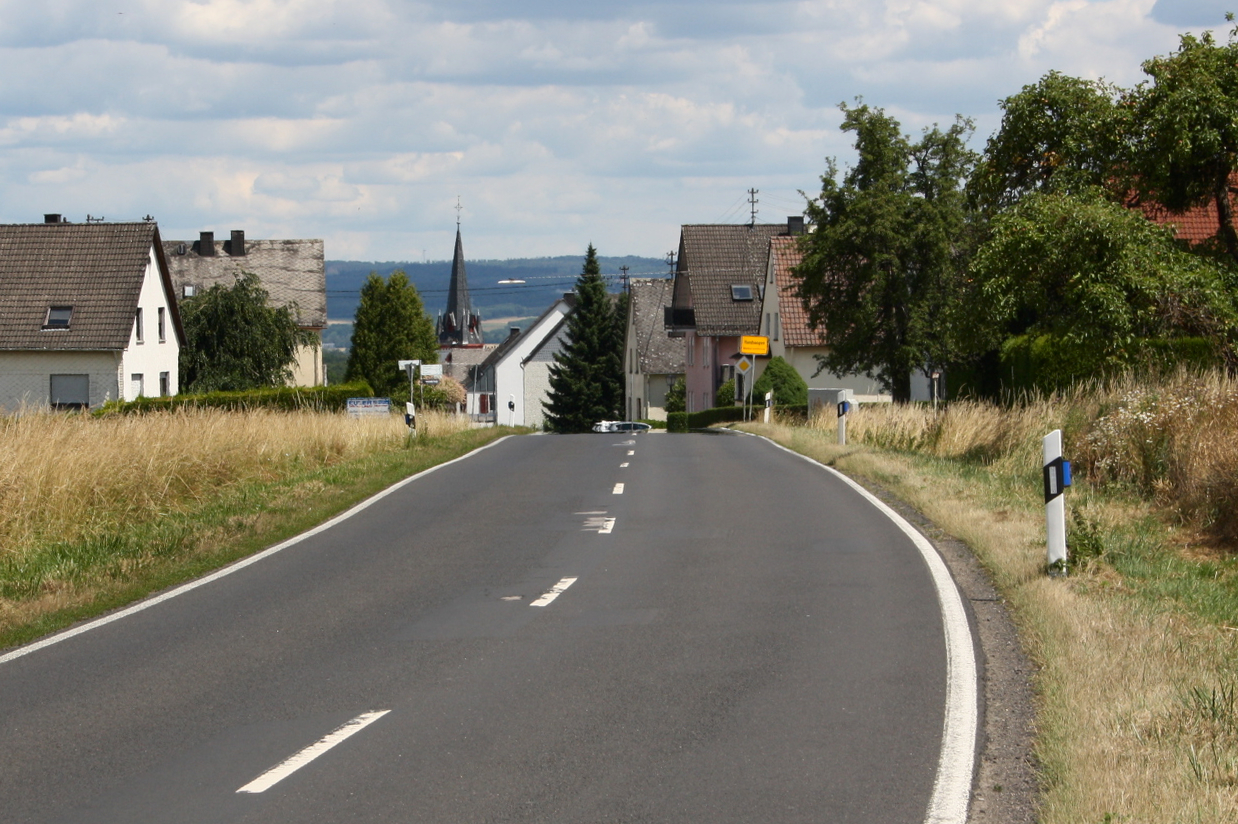

- Coat of arms

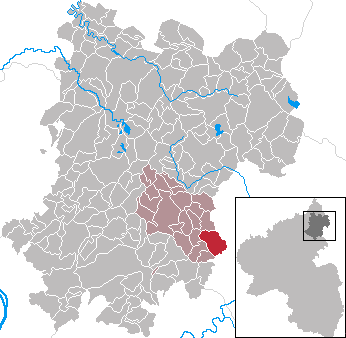
- Location of Hundsangen within Westerwaldkreis district
- Interactive map of Hundsangen
- Location within Germany Location within Rhineland-Palatinate
- Coordinates: 50°27′19″N 07°59′15″E
- Country: Germany
- State: Rhineland-Palatinate
- District: Westerwaldkreis
- Municipal assoc.: Wallmerod

Government
  - Mayor (2019–24): Melanie Brühl

Area
  - Total: 7.63 km^{2} (2.95 sq mi)
- Elevation: 240 m (790 ft)

Population (2025-12-31)
  - Total: 1,925
  - Density: 252/km^{2} (653/sq mi)
- Time zone: UTC+01:00 (CET)
  - Summer (DST): UTC+02:00 (CEST)
- Postal codes: 56414
- Dialling codes: 06435
- Vehicle registration: WW
- Website: hundsangen.de

Hundsangen is an Ortsgemeinde – a community belonging to a Verbandsgemeinde – in the Westerwaldkreis in Rhineland-Palatinate, Germany.

== Geography ==
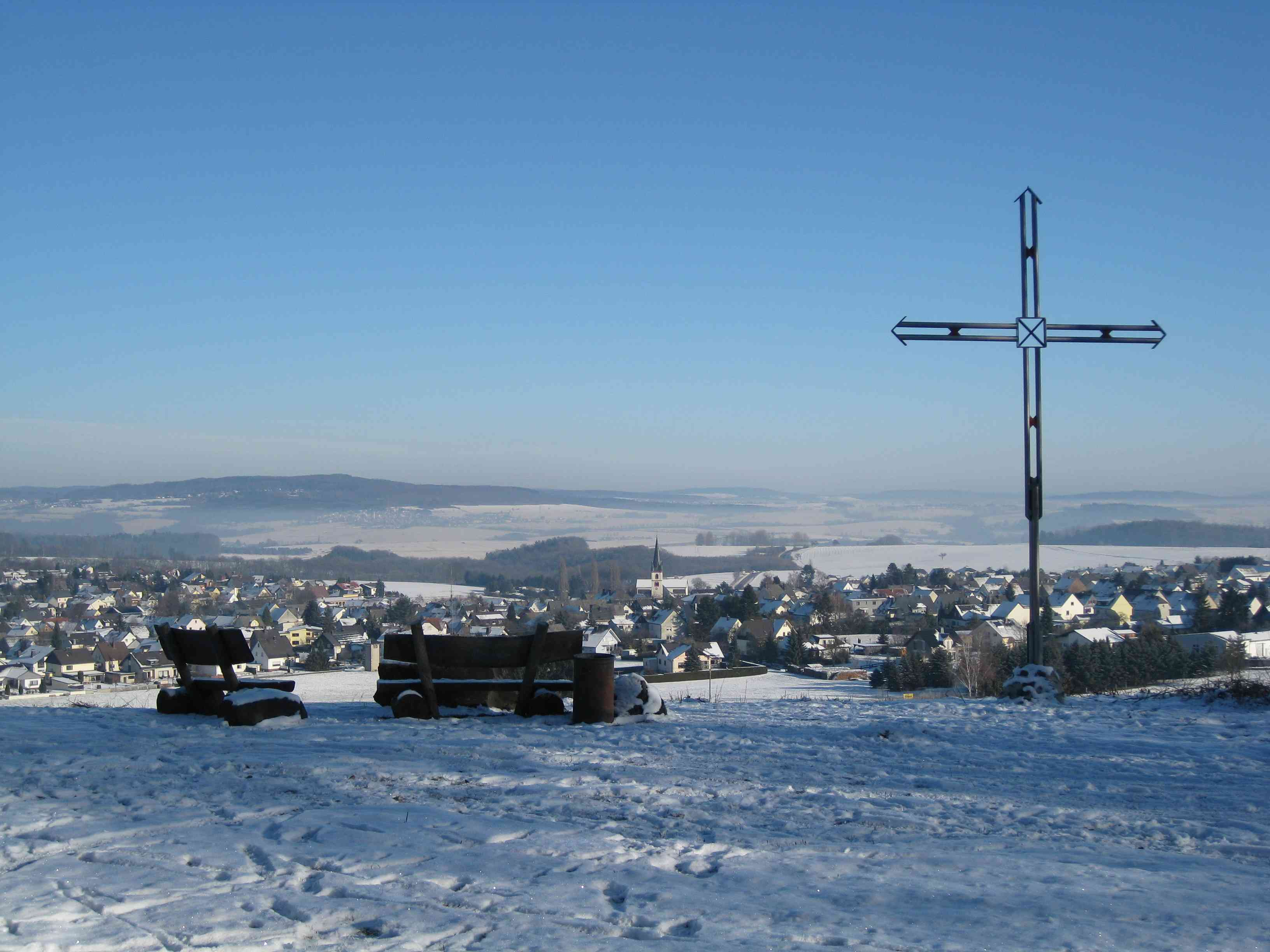
View of the village from Ollmersch hill.

=== Location ===
The village is located in the Westerwald region between Montabaur and Limburg an der Lahn right at the boundary between Rhineland-Palatinate and Hesse. Hundsangen is the biggest and also liveliest village in the Verbandsgemeinde of Wallmerod (some kind of collective municipality). Leisure facilities are abundant because of the geographic circumstances. Transport opportunities to the Frankfurt Rhine-Main Region and the Cologne/Bonn Region are well developed. Hundsangen offers its inhabitants a high quality of life.

A bigger hill, the so-called "Ollmersch", is a well-known sight of Hundsangen. The village hall is named Ollmerschhalle because of this hill.

=== Neighbouring communities ===
Hundsangen’s neighbours are Hadamar, Dornburg, Molsberg, Wallmerod, Weroth, Dreikirchen, Obererbach and Elz.

== History ==
In 1096, Hundsangen had its first documentary mention as Hundeszagel.

At Hundsangen’s graveyard, a Roman medallion was found. Today it is found in the Nassau Antiquities Collection (Sammlung Nassauischer Altertümer) in Wiesbaden.

== Culture and sightseeing ==
=== Music ===
Hundsangen has a church choir, a men’s singing club and a music club.

=== Buildings ===
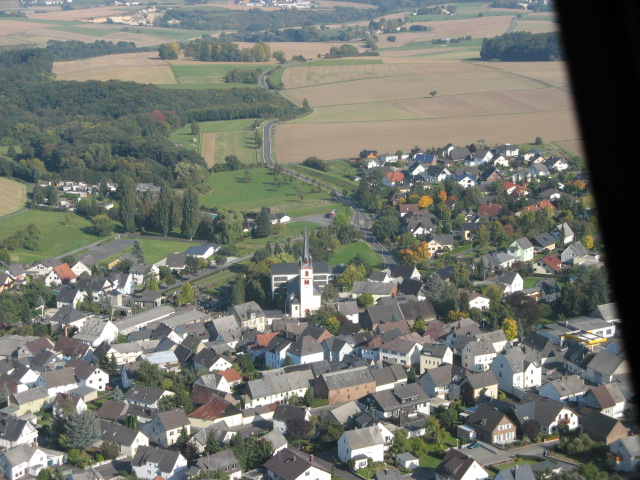
Aerial image of catholic church Saint Goar.

The Baroque parish church of St. Goar was built in 1726. The Romanesque churchtower, however, comes from the 12th century.

=== Parks ===
In Hundsangen there are several heavily frequented forests, with, for example, an educational nature trail in the forest Am Buch and a barbecue pit in the Boschern forest.

=== Natural monuments ===
In the Boschern forest are some cliffs from the time when Hundsangen was still on the seabed. They contain valuable marble, which has already been reported in the press.

=== Sport ===
==== Football ====
Hundsangen’s first football team played for many years in the football Rheinlandliga.

==== Shooting club ====
The local shooting club’s athletes have also made it to the German Championships.

===== Sport facilities =====
There are sporting grounds in the forest Am Buch with two football fields, and there is training in the main hall at the Ollmerschhalle. In the centre of Hundsangen, there is also a small football area. There is a shooting house in the Boschern forest.

=== Regular events ===
Hundsangen always holds its kermis in August, on the weekend after Assumption.

There are particularly impressive yearly Carnival events in this Westerwald community. Besides the Kappensitzungen, which held every year, the parade held every four years is a magnet for the public and draws tens of thousands of onlookers.

== Economy and infrastructure ==
=== Transport ===
Right through the community runs Bundesstraße 8, linking Limburg an der Lahn and Hennef. The nearest Autobahn interchanges are Diez, Limburg an der Lahn and Montabaur on the A 3 (Cologne–Frankfurt), some 9 km away. The nearest train stops are Dreikirchen at the Lower Westerwald railway (RB29) and Hadamar and the Upper Westerwald Railway (RB90). The local bus lines LM11, 492, 994 and N49 connect Hundsangen to the public transport, the village is located in the zone number 410 of the public transport association Verkehrsverbund Rhein-Mosel (VRM).

The nearest InterCityExpress stops are the railway stations at Montabaur and Limburg Süd on the Cologne-Frankfurt high-speed rail line. The Rhine-Main and Cologne urban agglomerations are thereby easily reached.

=== Education ===
Hundsangen has at its disposal a Catholic kindergarten and a primary school. Secondary schools (Gymnasien in Hadamar, Limburg and Montabaur, Realschulen in Hadamar and Montabaur as well as Hauptschulen in Salz, Montabaur and Hadamar) are linked to the community by local public transport.

=== Public institutions ===
- Swimming pool
- Town Hall
- St. Goar Catholic Parish Office
- Erich-Kästner-Schule
- Ollmerschhalle
- Public bath
