= Elbingen =

- Municipality
- Coat of arms

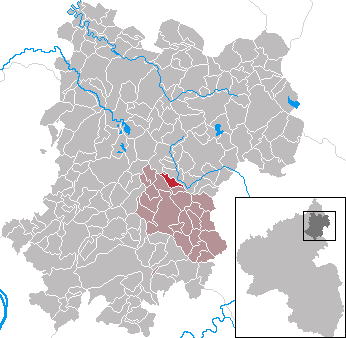
- Location of Elbingen within Westerwaldkreis district
- Interactive map of Elbingen
- Location within Germany Location within Rhineland-Palatinate
- Coordinates: 50°31′45″N 7°54′40″E
- Country: Germany
- State: Rhineland-Palatinate
- District: Westerwaldkreis
- Municipal assoc.: Wallmerod

Government
  - Mayor (2019–24): Maik Daubach

Area
  - Total: 2.30 km^{2} (0.89 sq mi)
- Elevation: 380 m (1,250 ft)

Population (2025-12-31)
  - Total: 358
  - Density: 156/km^{2} (403/sq mi)
- Time zone: UTC+01:00 (CET)
  - Summer (DST): UTC+02:00 (CEST)
- Postal codes: 56459
- Dialling codes: 06435
- Vehicle registration: WW
- Website: www.elbingen.de

Elbingen is an Ortsgemeinde – a municipality belonging to a Verbandsgemeinde – in the Westerwaldkreis in Rhineland-Palatinate, Germany.

== Geography ==
The municipality lies in the Westerwald between Montabaur and Westerburg. Surrounded by a well cared-for and charming landscape, Elbingen lies in the middle of a wooded area with many hiking and cycling trails. The municipality belongs to the Verbandsgemeinde of Wallmerod, a kind of collective municipality.

== History ==
In 1383, Elbingen had its first documentary mention as Elmennyngen and once lay in the area of the Niederlahngau, the lordly domain of the Counts of Nassau. The name can be traced to the ancient name Alaman, leading to the conclusion that there was an earlier Germanic settlement here. Only later did the name Elbingen come to be associated with the Elb, the important Westerwald river that runs through the municipal area. In a document from 1383, Friedrich von Elmennyngen is named; however, no coat of arms from this middle-noble family has been handed down. Other noble families, such as von Hattert, von Reifenberg (arms red and silver) and von Dehrn had holdings here. The long era in which the House of Nassau held sway was interrupted in 1564 when the parish of Salz, and thereby Elbingen, passed to the Electorate of Trier. By 1806, however, Elbingen passed back to Nassau and belonged until 1866 to the Duchy of Nassau, and thereafter to the Prussian province of Hesse-Nassau. The civic arms bear a golden lion armed and langued gules (ie with red claws and tongue) on a blue field, which was the charge seen on the arms borne by the Counts of Nassau. This refers to the great span of time when the municipality was under Nassau’s sway.

Besides the village itself, an oilmill on the Kälberbach is mentioned in 1739, which by 1786 was somewhat inexplicably named Spießmühle (“Spear Mill”), but it still stands below the village now and is used as a dwelling. The Spießmühle is symbolically represented in the arms by the red half waterwheel in silver. Red and silver are the tinctures of the Electorate of Trier and thus they bear witness to Elbingen’s time in the “Trierschland”. The silver-blue wavy fesses stand for the Elbbach, the Kälberbach and the reservoir built in 1967, part of which covers Elbingen’s municipal area, making a great recreation area on the Elbingen shore.

Elbingen’s municipal area has always been characterized by agriculture, which for a long time was the inhabitants’ main source of earnings. The waterwheel is therefore also a symbol for agriculture, whose produce was processed at the mill.

Besides a small amount of basalt and brown coal mining, clay bricks were also fired in the 19th century. At the same time, Elbingers would fire their stoneware, such as jugs and so forth for household use. From this custom arose the name Elwinger Kriielcher, which Elbingers have kept to this day and bear with pride. This is symbolized by the silver jug in the Nassau lion’s paws.

The municipality was once united with Mähren as of 1969, and the amalgamation bore the name Elbingen-Mähren. It was, however, dissolved again in 1993.

== Economy and infrastructure ==
The village, in which roughly 310 people live today, has undergone a successful village renewal project to increase greenery. Remodeling was done on the village square around the bakehouse and the old timber-frame middle-class house (Bürgerhaus) which is described as having a “homely appearance”.

On the municipality limits bordering Hahn am See lies a private lake in the woods with a camping ground and trailer park.

== Transport ==
In the past, Elbingen was connected to the Cross Westerwald Railway (Montabaur - Wallmerod - Westerburg - Renenrod - Herborn), but nowadays this line between Montabaur and Wallmerod is only in service for fright trains and from Fehl-Ritzhausen to Rennerod station touristic railbike tours take place, organized by the interest group IG Westerwald-Querbahn e. V. (IWQ). The village is served by local busses and located in zone number 424 of the transport association Verkehrsverbund Rhein-Mosel (VRM).

== Images ==
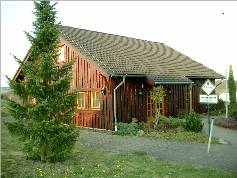
Bürgerhaus

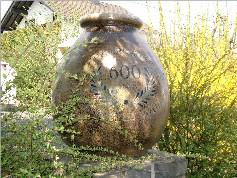
Dorfkrug ("Village Jug")

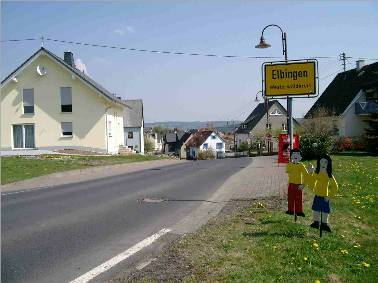
Elbingen
