= Zehnhausen bei Wallmerod =

- Municipality
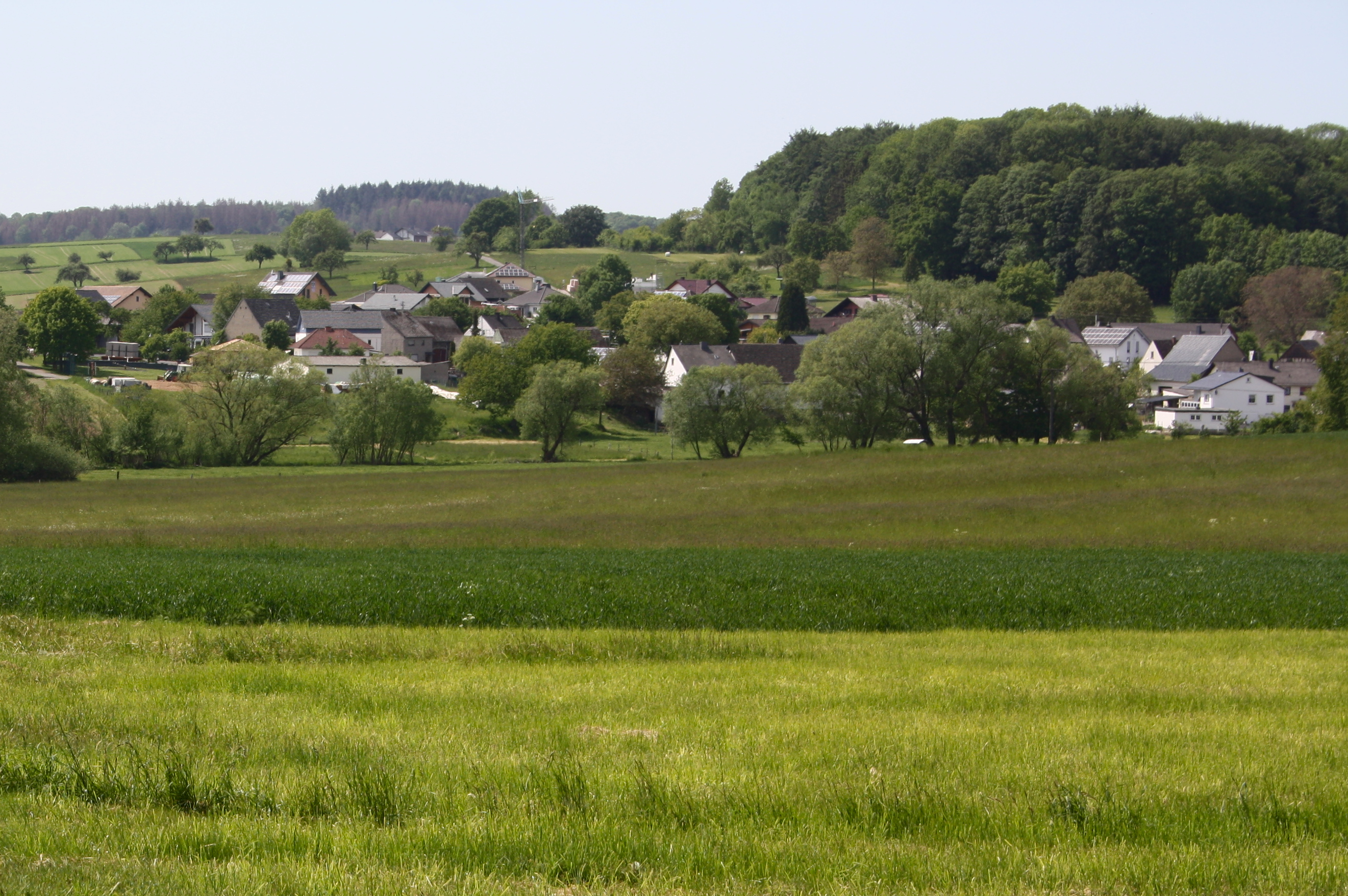

- Coat of arms

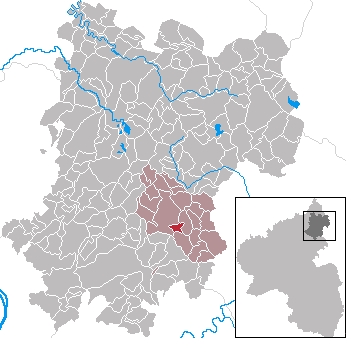
- Location of Zehnhausen bei Wallmerod within Westerwaldkreis district
- Interactive map of Zehnhausen bei Wallmerod
- Location within Germany Location within Rhineland-Palatinate
- Coordinates: 50°28′34″N 7°55′25″E
- Country: Germany
- State: Rhineland-Palatinate
- District: Westerwaldkreis
- Municipal assoc.: Wallmerod

Government
  - Mayor (2019–24): Michael Karaski

Area
  - Total: 1.57 km^{2} (0.61 sq mi)
- Elevation: 295 m (968 ft)

Population (2025-12-31)
  - Total: 196
  - Density: 125/km^{2} (323/sq mi)
- Time zone: UTC+01:00 (CET)
  - Summer (DST): UTC+02:00 (CEST)
- Postal codes: 56414
- Dialling codes: 06435
- Vehicle registration: WW
- Website: www.wallmerod.de

Zehnhausen bei Wallmerod is an Ortsgemeinde – a community part of a Verbandsgemeinde – in the Westerwaldkreis in Rhineland-Palatinate, Germany. It is one of two communities named Zehnhausen in the Westerwaldkreis, the other being Zehnhausen bei Rennerod.

== Geography ==
The community lies in the Westerwald between Montabaur and Limburg an der Lahn. It belongs to the Verbandsgemeinde of Wallmerod, a kind of collective municipality. Its seat is in the like-named town.

== History ==
In 1391, Zehnhausen bei Wallmerod had its first documentary mention as Zeenhußen.

== Politics ==
The municipal council is made up of 6 council members who were elected in a majority vote in a municipal election on 13 June 2004.

== Regular events ==
The Linden Blossom Festival (Lindenblütenfest) held every year on the first weekend in July has grown into an attraction for the whole local area.

== Economy and infrastructure ==
To Bundesstraße 8, linking Limburg an der Lahn and Hennef, is four kilometres. The nearest Autobahn interchange is Diez on the A 3 (Cologne–Frankfurt), some eleven kilometres away. The nearest InterCityExpress stop is the railway station at Montabaur on the Cologne-Frankfurt high-speed rail line.

Zehnhausen is located in the zone number 423 of the public transport association Verkehrsverbund Rhein-Mosel (VRM).
