= Herschbach =

Herschbach may refer to:

- Dudley R. Herschbach, American chemist
- Herschbach, Selters, a municipality in the Verbandsgemeinde Selters, Westerwaldkreis, Rhineland-Palatinate, Germany
- Herschbach, Wallmerod, a municipality in the Verbandsgemeinde Wallmerod, Westerwaldkreis, Rhineland-Palatinate, Germany
