= Niederahr =

- Municipality
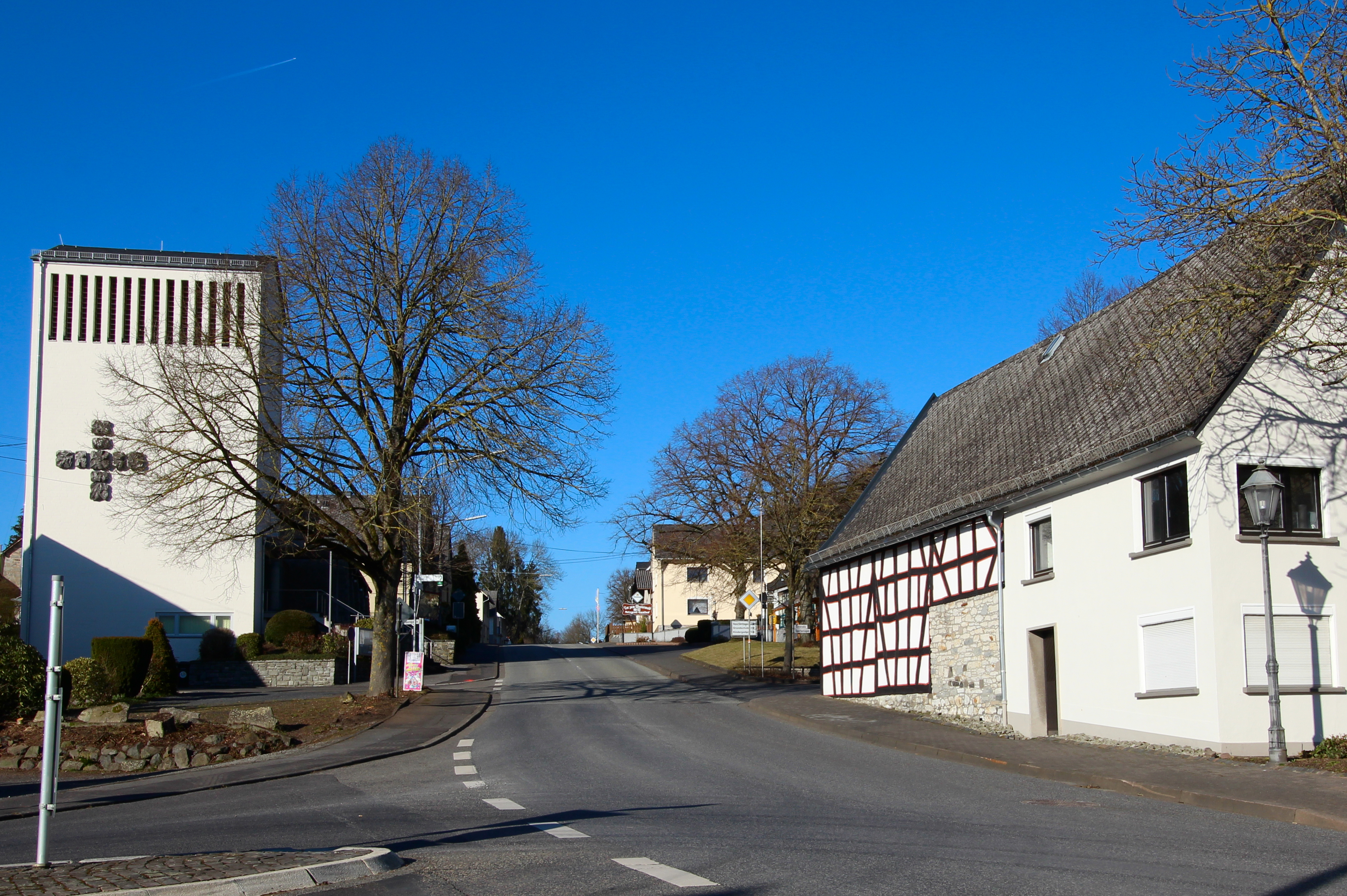

- Coat of arms

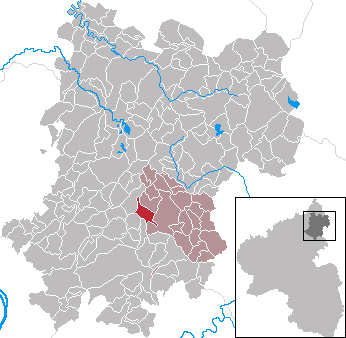
- Location of Niederahr within Westerwaldkreis district
- Interactive map of Niederahr
- Location within Germany Location within Rhineland-Palatinate
- Coordinates: 50°29′31″N 7°51′40″E
- Country: Germany
- State: Rhineland-Palatinate
- District: Westerwaldkreis
- Municipal assoc.: Wallmerod

Government
  - Mayor (2019–24): Jürgen Eulberg

Area
  - Total: 4.03 km^{2} (1.56 sq mi)
- Elevation: 300 m (980 ft)

Population (2025-12-31)
  - Total: 816
  - Density: 202/km^{2} (524/sq mi)
- Time zone: UTC+01:00 (CET)
  - Summer (DST): UTC+02:00 (CEST)
- Postal codes: 56414
- Dialling codes: 02602
- Vehicle registration: WW
- Website: www.wallmerod.de

Niederahr is an Ortsgemeinde – a community belonging to a Verbandsgemeinde – in the Westerwaldkreis in Rhineland-Palatinate, Germany.

== Geography ==
The community lies in the Westerwald between Montabaur and Hachenburg. Through the community flows the Ahrbach. The community belongs to the Verbandsgemeinde of Wallmerod, a kind of collective municipality. Its seat is in the like-named town.

== History ==
In 959, Niederahr had its first documentary mention.

== Politics ==
The municipal council is made up of 12 council members who were elected in a majority vote in a municipal election on 13 June 2004.

== Economy and infrastructure ==
=== Transport ===
The local bus lines 477 and 959 connect Niederahr to the public transport.

The village is located in the area of the transport association Verkehrsverbund Rhein-Mosel (VRM), in the fare zone number 422.

Right through the community runs Bundesstraße 255, linking Montabaur and Rennerod. The nearest Autobahn interchange is Montabaur on the A 3 (Cologne–Frankfurt), some 5 km away.

There was a station of the Cross Westerwald railway (Montabaur - Wallmerod - Westerburg - Rennerod - Herborn) in Niederahr, nowadays the section of this line between Montabaur and Wallmerod is only in service for fright traffic, from Fehl-Ritzhausen to Rennerod station touristic Railbike tours take place organized by the interest group IG Westerwald-Querbahn e. V. (IWQ), in 2005, 2006, 2007 and 2010, IWQ has organized special train rides on the Montabaur - Wallmerod section as well.

The bus lines 477 and 959 run through Niederahr.

The nearest InterCityExpress stop is the railway station at Montabaur on the Cologne-Frankfurt high-speed rail line.

=== Established businesses ===
Westfalia Separator makes decanters at its Niederahr works.
