= Salz, Rhineland-Palatinate =

Salz
- Municipality
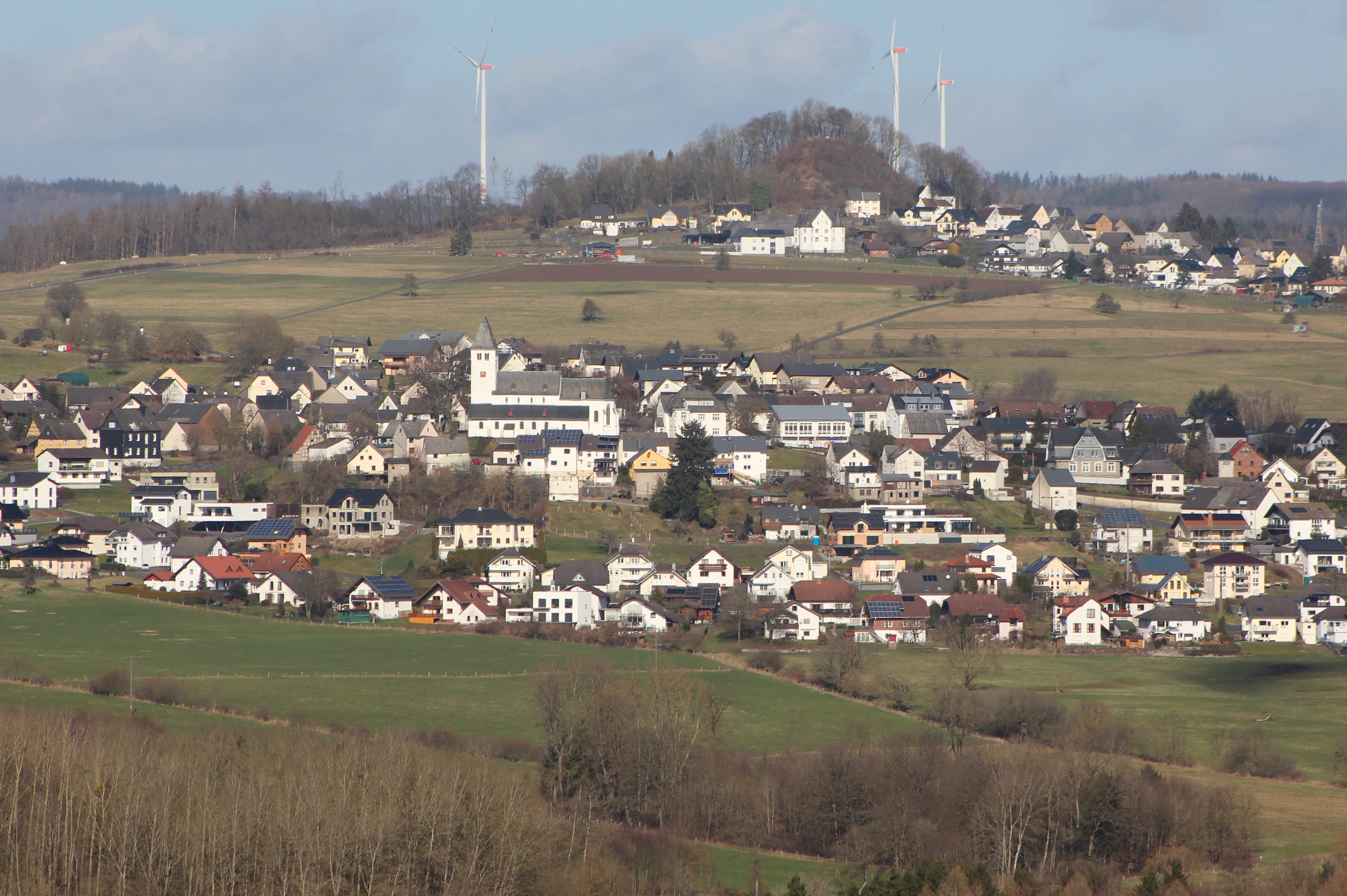

- Coat of arms

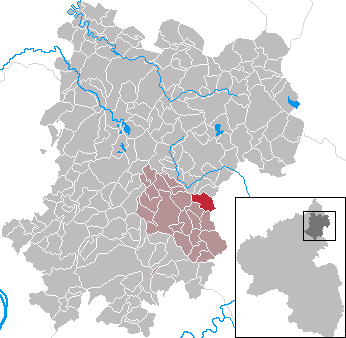
- Location of Salz within Westerwaldkreis district
- Interactive map of Salz
- Location within Germany Location within Rhineland-Palatinate
- Coordinates: 50°30′36″N 7°57′49″E
- Country: Germany
- State: Rhineland-Palatinate
- District: Westerwaldkreis
- Municipal assoc.: Wallmerod

Government
  - Mayor (2019–24): Holger Wörsdörfer

Area
  - Total: 4.96 km^{2} (1.92 sq mi)
- Elevation: 320 m (1,050 ft)

Population (2025-12-31)
  - Total: 875
  - Density: 176/km^{2} (457/sq mi)
- Time zone: UTC+01:00 (CET)
  - Summer (DST): UTC+02:00 (CEST)
- Postal codes: 56414
- Dialling codes: 06435
- Vehicle registration: WW
- Website: www.wallmerod.de

Salz (German pronunciation: [zalt]) is an Ortsgemeinde – a community belonging to a Verbandsgemeinde – in the Westerwaldkreis in Rhineland-Palatinate, Germany.

== Geography ==
The community lies in the Westerwald, between Montabaur and Rennerod. It belongs to the Verbandsgemeinde of Wallmerod, a kind of collective municipality. Its seat is in the like-named town.

== History ==
In 1150, Salz had its first documentary mention.

== Politics ==
The municipal council is made up of 12 council members who were elected in a majority vote in a municipal election on 13 June 2004.

== Culture and sightseeing ==
The Catholic parish church of St. Adelphus is a Romanesque basilica with a Late Gothic quire. Lying buried in the church is one of Ludwig van Beethoven’s grandfathers.

== Economy and infrastructure ==
The village Salz is located in the zone 429 of the transport association Verkehrsverbund Rhein-Mosel (VRM).

Local bus lines serving Salz are 450, 481, 492, 959 and 973.

Just west of the community runs Bundesstraße 8, linking Limburg an der Lahn and Hennef. The nearest Autobahn interchange is Diez on the A 3 (Cologne–Frankfurt), some 13 km away. The nearest access to railway serive is in Willmenrod at the Limburg-Altenkirchen railway, the nearest InterCityExpress stop is the railway station at Montabaur on the Cologne-Frankfurt high-speed rail line.

A wind farm is located in the area of Salz and Berzhahn.
