= Oberahr =

- Municipality
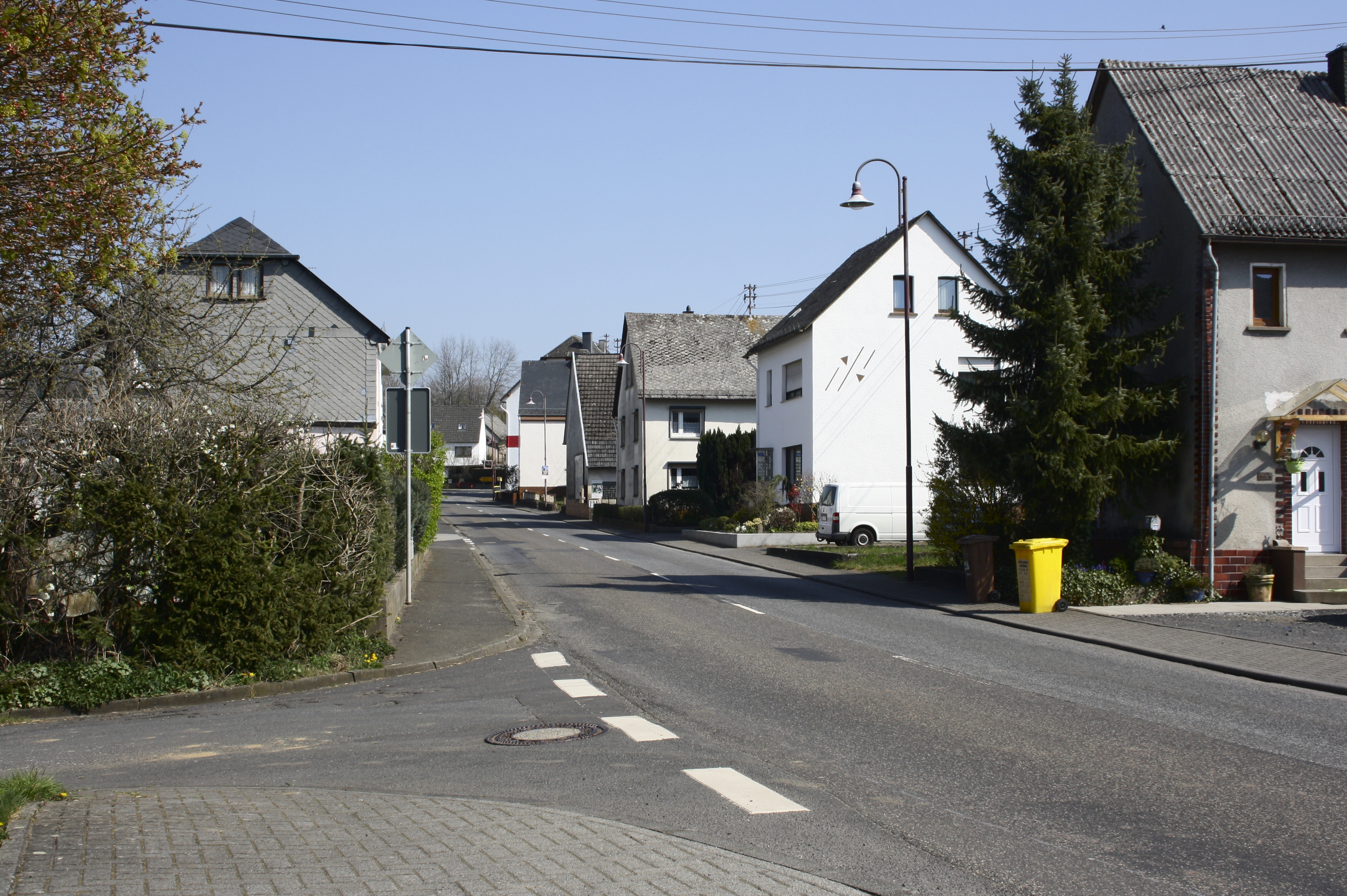

- Coat of arms

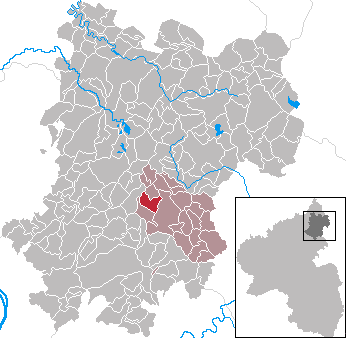
- Location of Oberahr within Westerwaldkreis district
- Interactive map of Oberahr
- Location within Germany Location within Rhineland-Palatinate
- Coordinates: 50°30′16″N 7°52′5″E
- Country: Germany
- State: Rhineland-Palatinate
- District: Westerwaldkreis
- Municipal assoc.: Wallmerod

Government
  - Mayor (2019–24): Karsten Opper

Area
  - Total: 4.27 km^{2} (1.65 sq mi)
- Elevation: 330 m (1,080 ft)

Population (2025-12-31)
  - Total: 546
  - Density: 128/km^{2} (331/sq mi)
- Time zone: UTC+01:00 (CET)
  - Summer (DST): UTC+02:00 (CEST)
- Postal codes: 56414
- Dialling codes: 02602
- Vehicle registration: WW
- Website: www.wallmerod.de

Oberahr is an Ortsgemeinde – a community belonging to a Verbandsgemeinde – in the Westerwaldkreis in Rhineland-Palatinate, Germany.

== Geography ==
The community lies in the Westerwald between Montabaur and Hachenburg. Through the community from north to south flows the Ahrbach. Oberahr belongs to the Verbandsgemeinde of Wallmerod, a kind of collective municipality. Its seat is in the like-named town.

== History ==
Oberahr, in 1490 Oberanre to use the form in its first documentary mention, lies in the headwaters of the Ahrbach, which was mentioned as early as 959 as the Anara. It is the community's namesake and flows through the municipal area from north to south. Oberahr lay in the former Niederlahngau from its earliest times, in the parish and court district of Meudt under the overlordship of the Counts at Diez and Nassau. Under the 1564 Treaties of Diez, the parish of Meudt passed to the Electorate of Trier, and thereby the Oberahrers lived in the Trierschland until 1802 under the rule of the Krummstab (literally “Crooked Staff”, but meaning “crosier”). Later, the Nassau princes took the areas on the Rhine’s right bank back into their ownership, and as of 1815, Oberahr, too, belonged to the newly formed Duchy of Nassau, after whose annexation in 1866, Oberahr found itself in the Prussian province of Hesse-Nassau.

== Politics ==
=== Community council ===
The council is made up of 12 council members who were elected in a majority vote in a municipal election on 13 June 2004.

=== Coat of arms ===
In the community’s arms the Ahrbach, and thereby also the community’s name, are symbolized by the parting per pale wavy. The former overlords of Nassau and Trier are recalled in the arms by the tinctures blue and gold and the red “Trier Cross” in silver. For the church and the patron saint (Saint Blaise) stands a bishop's staff that ends in a flame, symbolizing the patron saint's attribute or Saint Blaise's blessing. At the same time, the bishop's staff refers to the Trier Krummstab. The mountains and the Beulstein are heraldically represented in the arms as a blue and gold three-knolled hill (Dreiberg in German heraldry). The agriculture and the forest are each symbolized by a sprouting golden ear and a beech leaf

== Economy and infrastructure ==
The local bus lines 477 and 959 run through Oberahr. Running right through the community is Bundesstraße 255, linking Montabaur and Rennerod. The nearest Autobahn interchange is Montabaur on the A 3 (Cologne–Frankfurt), some 7 km away. Oberlahr had a stop at the former Kasbachtalbahn (Linz (Rhine) - Flammersfeld which is out of service for public transport today. The nearest InterCityExpress stop is the railway station at Montabaur on the Cologne-Frankfurt high-speed rail line.
