= Wallmerod =

- Municipality
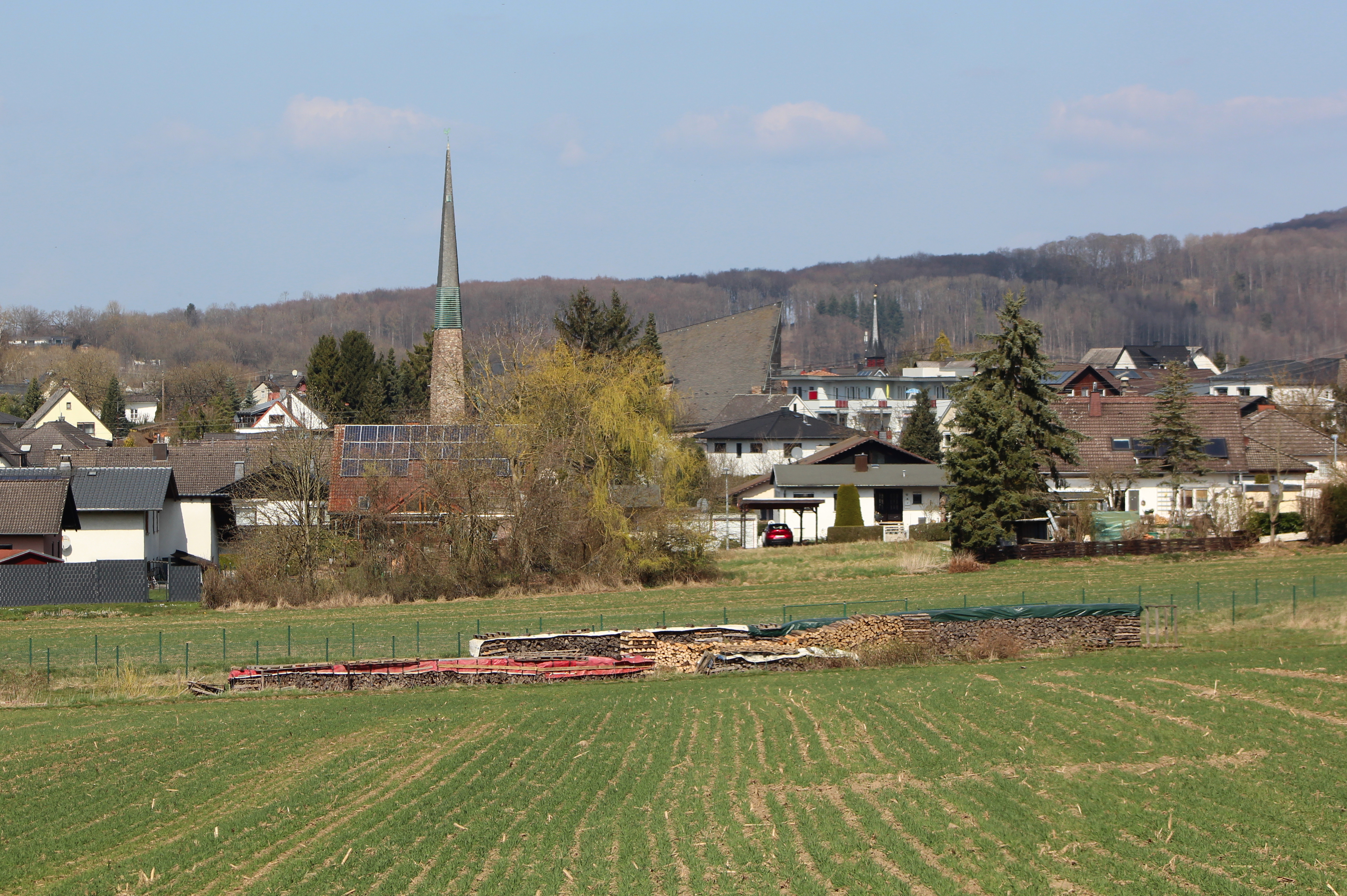

- Coat of arms

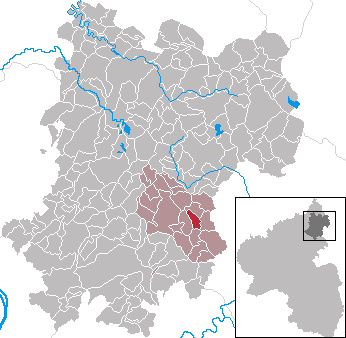
- Location of Wallmerod within Westerwaldkreis district
- Interactive map of Wallmerod
- Location within Germany Location within Rhineland-Palatinate
- Coordinates: 50°29′05″N 7°57′07″E
- Country: Germany
- State: Rhineland-Palatinate
- District: Westerwaldkreis
- Municipal assoc.: Wallmerod

Government
  - Mayor (2019–24): Ulf Ludwig

Area
  - Total: 2.65 km^{2} (1.02 sq mi)
- Elevation: 320 m (1,050 ft)

Population (2025-12-31)
  - Total: 1,528
  - Density: 577/km^{2} (1,490/sq mi)
- Time zone: UTC+01:00 (CET)
  - Summer (DST): UTC+02:00 (CEST)
- Postal codes: 56414
- Dialling codes: 06435
- Vehicle registration: WW
- Website: Wallmerod

Wallmerod (German pronunciation: [ˈvalməʁoːt]) is an Ortsgemeinde—a community belonging to a Verbandsgemeinde—in the Westerwaldkreis in Rhineland-Palatinate, Germany.

== Geography ==
=== Location ===
Wallmerod lies in the Westerwald between Montabaur and Rennerod. The community is the seat of the Verbandsgemeinde of Wallmerod, a kind of collective municipality.

=== Neighbouring communities ===
Wallmerod borders in the north on the community of Bilkheim, in the east on the community of Molsberg, in the south on the community of Weroth, and in the west on the community of Berod. To the southeast lies Hundsangen, which can easily be reached over Bundesstraße 8.

== History ==
On 4 February 1276, Wallmerode had its first documentary mention. On this day the Archbishops of Cologne and Trier and the Counts Gerhard von Diez, Heinrich von Sponheim and Diether von Molsberg all met, at which time Count Diether von Molsberg and his wife, Lisa von Isenburg, sealed a pledge in future not to harm the Marienstatt Monastery any longer, and to relinquish thereto all rights for evermore. Thus, in two archbishops’ and several princes’ presence, was a longstanding dispute between the Marienstatt Monastery and the Lords of Molsberg laid to rest.

In the Duchy of Nassau, the seat of the Amt of Meudt was shifted from Montabaur to Wallmerod, and given the new name Amt Wallmerod.

In the course of administrative reform, Wallmerod became the seat of the Verbandsgemeinde in 1972.

The community, which today has some 1400 inhabitants, was, owing to its location, already of great importance early on. Bundesstraße 8 running through the middle of Wallmerod and formerly called Hohe Straße (“High Road”) or Kölnische Straße (“Cologne Road”), was likely, in its main branch, an age-old transport link from the northwest to the southeast (from Antwerp to Innsbruck).

| Year | 1815 | 1835 | 1871 | 1905 | 1939 | 1950 | 1961 | 1970 | 1980 | 1990 | 2000 | 2005 |
|---|---|---|---|---|---|---|---|---|---|---|---|---|
| Pop. | 244 | 478 | 544 | 484 | 599 | 669 | 676 | 791 | 762 | 1007 | 1263 | |

=== Coat of arms ===
The spade with the W refers to the community’s name. The W is, of course, the initial letter, but moreover, the spade stands for the placename element –rod, from the root of Rodung (“clearing” in German; cognate with “Roding” found in some English placenames). The two churches Evangelical and Catholic.

== Culture and sightseeing ==
=== Buildings ===
Buildings under monumental protection are, among others, the tithe house built in 1834, the prison from the first half of the 19th century, and the old bakehouse.

=== Sport ===
On 1 December 2006, the sport and culture hall was dedicated, which the Ortsgemeinde of Wallmerod shares with the Verbandsgemeinde of Wallmerod.

== Economy and infrastructure ==
=== Train service ===
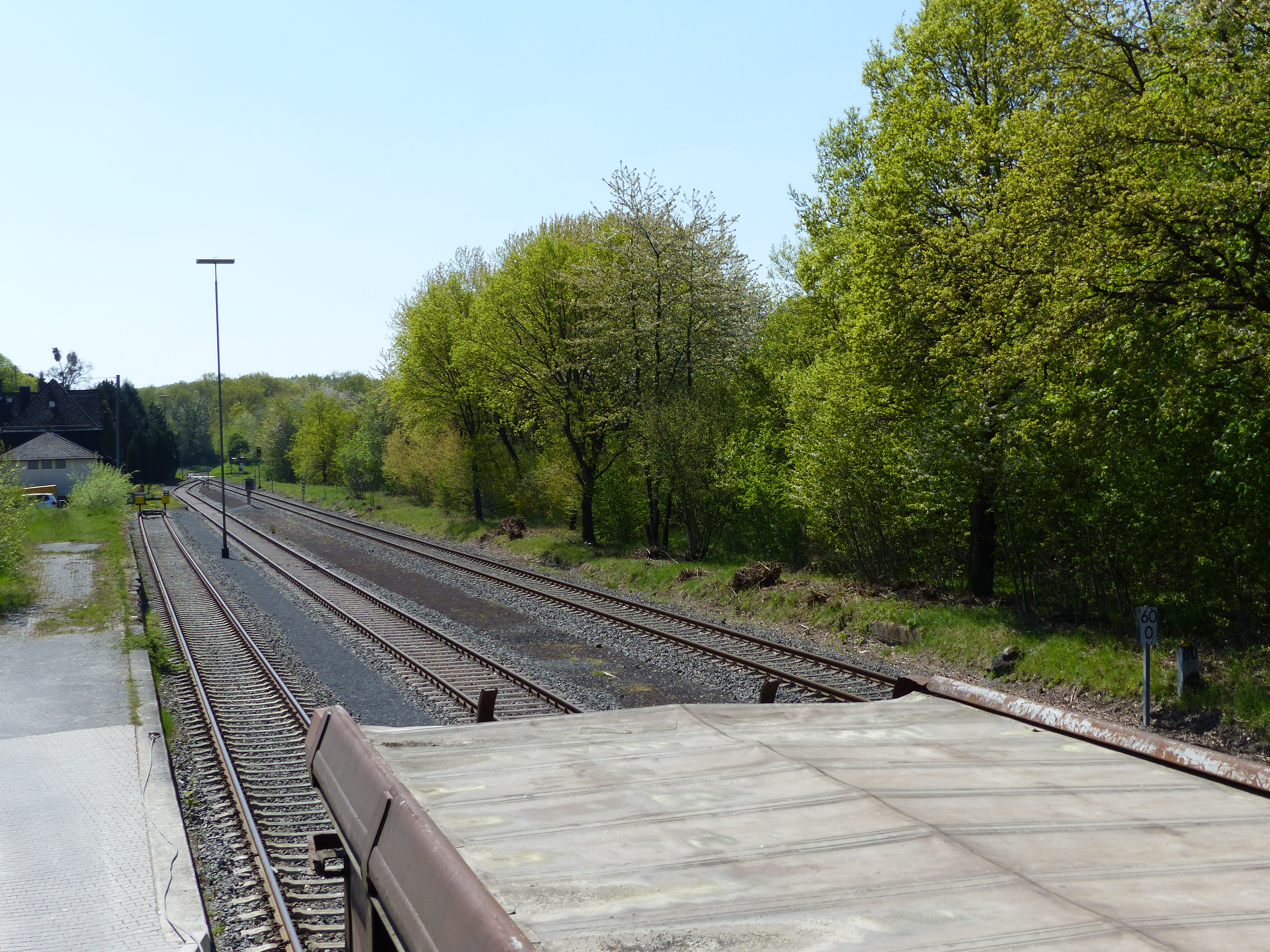
Wallmerod train station

Wallmerod station is located on the Westerwaldquerbahn (Cross Westerwald railway) which ran from Montabaur station via Wallmerod, Westerburg and Rennerod to Herborn. Nowadays the line is primarily out of service, only freight trains run between Montabaur and Wallmerod and touristic railbike excursions between Rennerod and Fehl-Ritzhausen organized by the interest group IG Westerwald - Querbahn e. V..

The nearest passenger stations, however, are Dreikirchen and Steinefrenz on the Limburg-Staffel–Siershahn railway (RB29). The InterCityExpress station at Montabaur is 13 km away, and the one at Limburg Süd is 21 km away.

=== Local bus transport ===
Wallmerod has access to the public bus transport through the lines 481, 482, 492, 959 and 994.

Wallmerof is located in the zone 423 of Verkehrsverbund Rhein-Mosel (VRM).

=== Streets ===
Wallmerod lies favourably with regard to transport on the old trade road (Hohe Straße), nowadays called Bundesstraße 8, between Frankfurt am Main (78 km) and Cologne (103 km) in the southern Westerwald. The Autobahn interchange Diez/Wallmerod on the A 3 (Cologne–Frankfurt) is 9 km away.

=== Education ===
Wallmerod has one kindergarten and one primary school.

== Notable people ==
- Johannes Orth (born 14 January 1847 in Wallmerod; died 13 January 1923 in Berlin) was a German physician, anatomist and pathologist

== Gallery ==
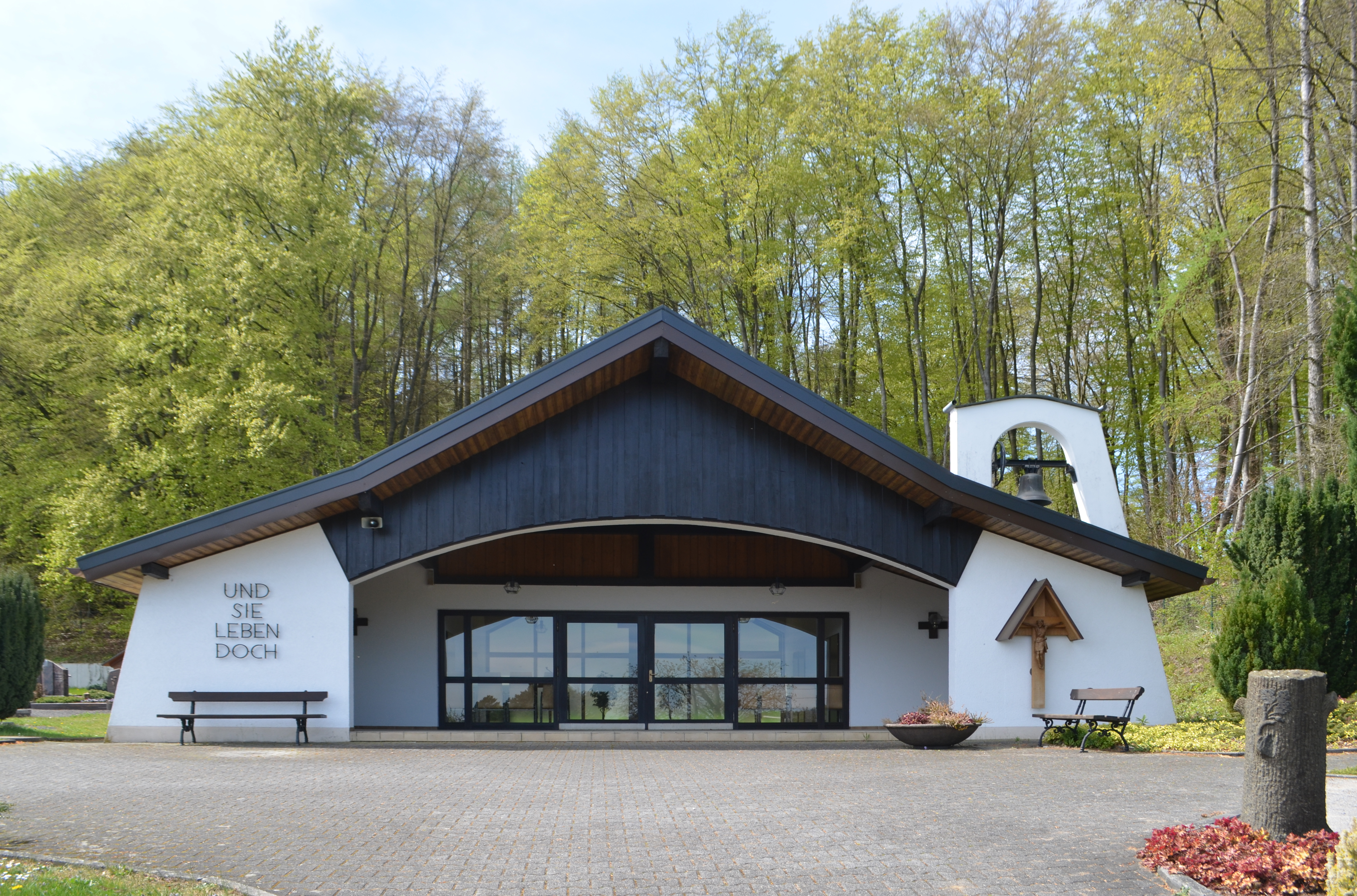
Hall at Wallmerod cemetry

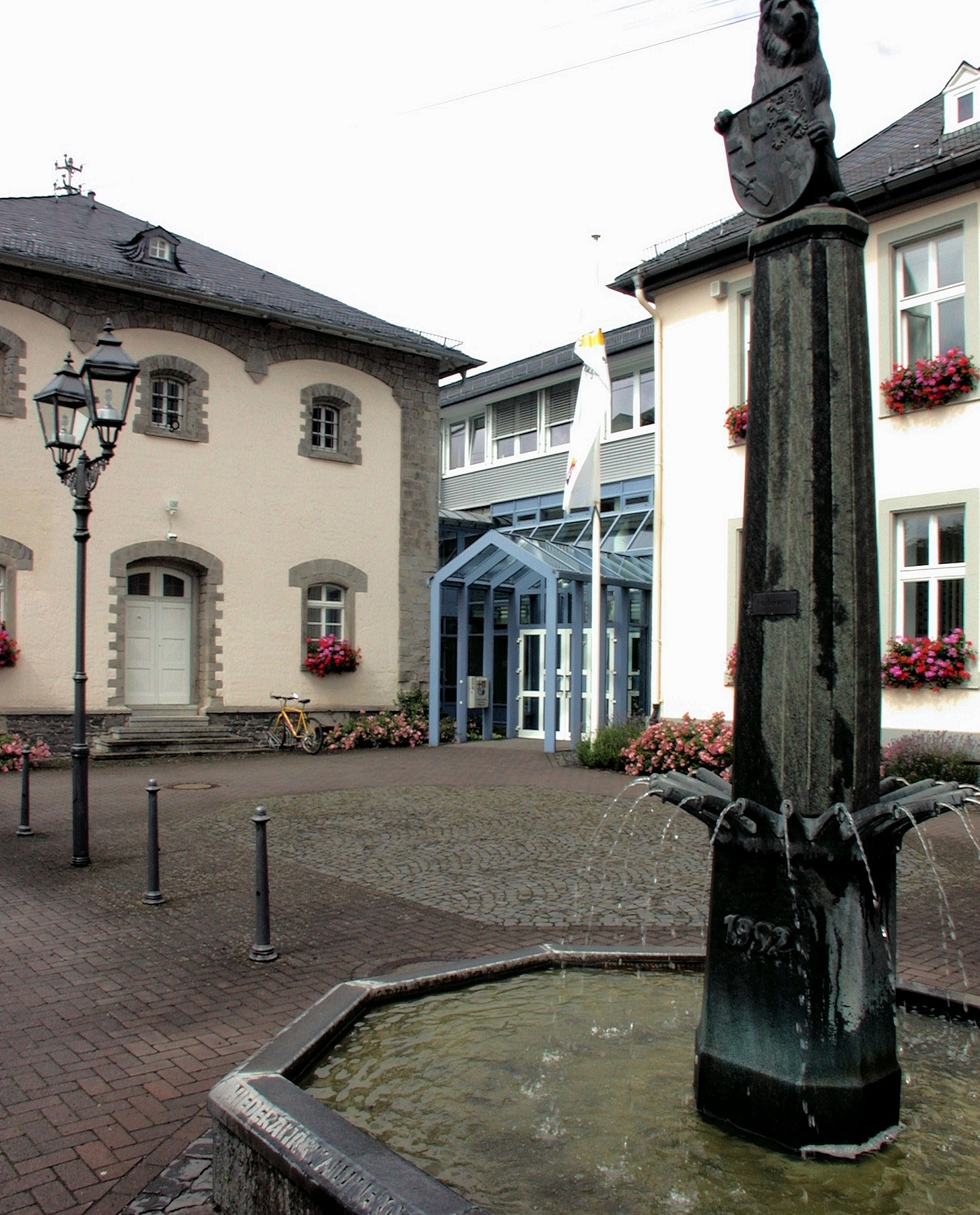
Wallmerod's town hall

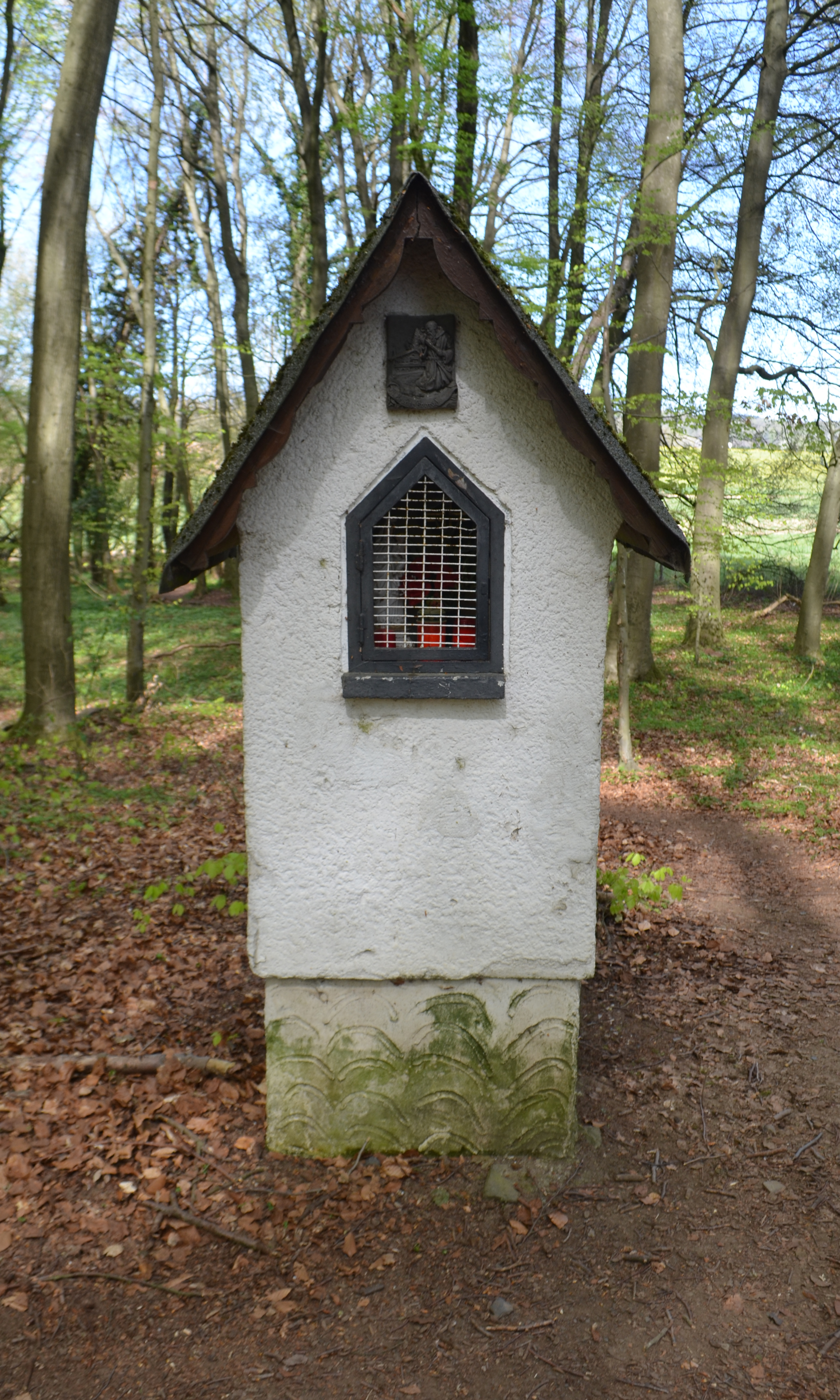
Konrad chapel

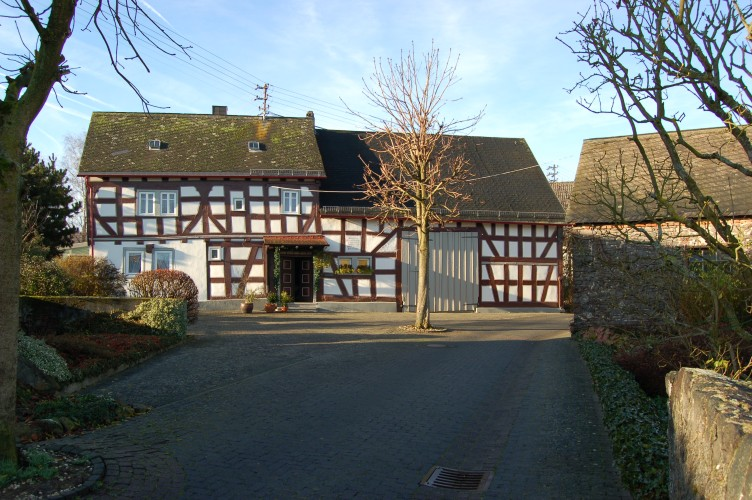
Look into the Eckengasse

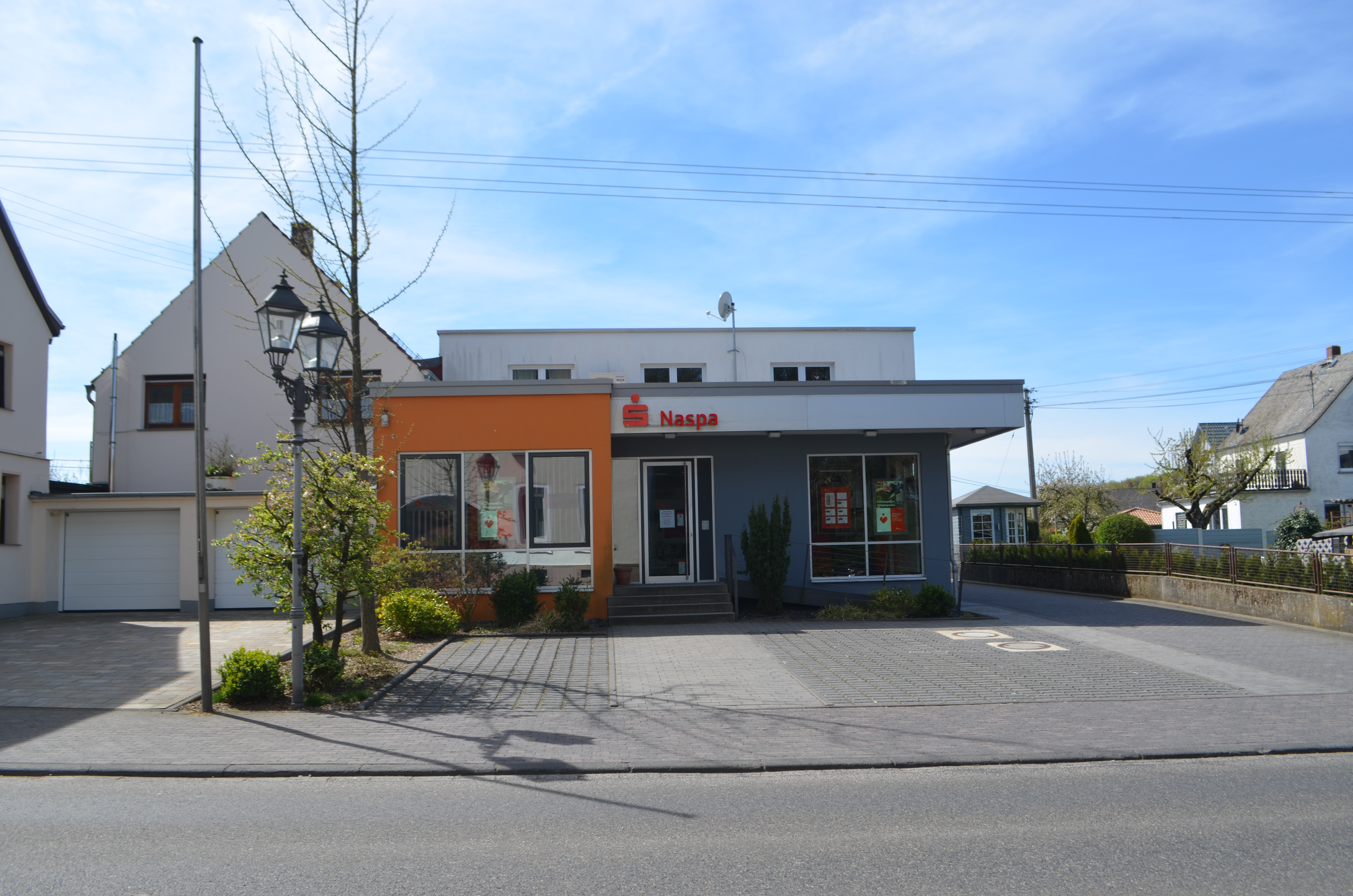
Bank at thr main road
