= Kuhnhöfen =

- Municipality
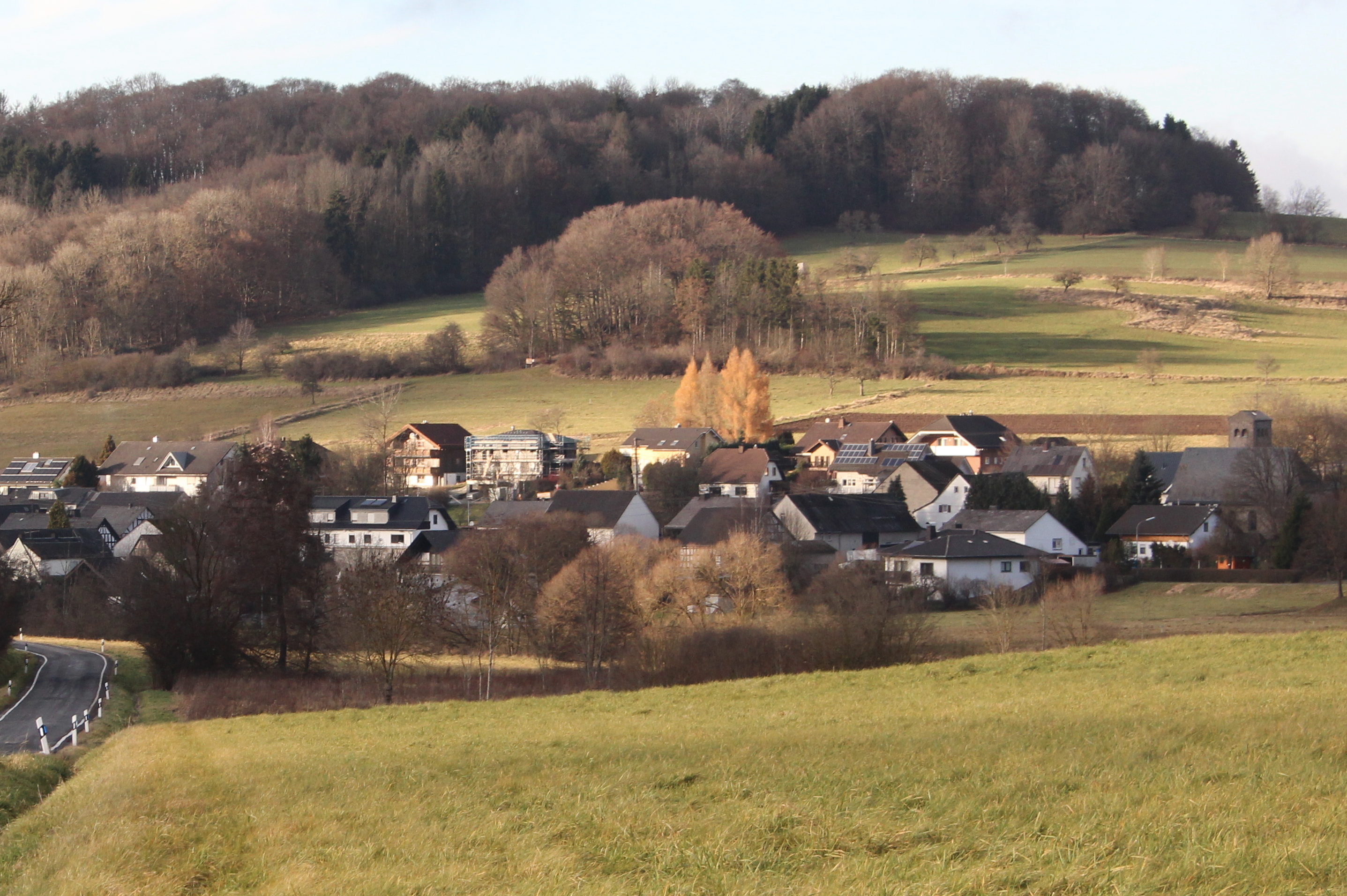

- Coat of arms

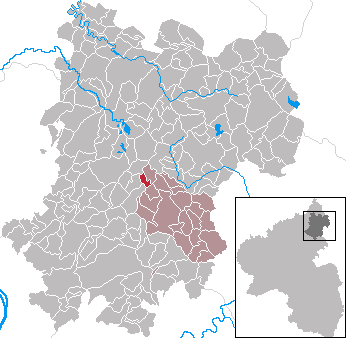
- Location of Kuhnhöfen within Westerwaldkreis district
- Interactive map of Kuhnhöfen
- Location within Germany Location within Rhineland-Palatinate
- Coordinates: 50°32′00″N 7°51′47″E
- Country: Germany
- State: Rhineland-Palatinate
- District: Westerwaldkreis
- Municipal assoc.: Wallmerod

Government
  - Mayor (2019–24): Gerhard Hehl

Area
  - Total: 1.68 km^{2} (0.65 sq mi)
- Elevation: 390 m (1,280 ft)

Population (2025-12-31)
  - Total: 154
  - Density: 91.7/km^{2} (237/sq mi)
- Time zone: UTC+01:00 (CET)
  - Summer (DST): UTC+02:00 (CEST)
- Postal codes: 56244
- Dialling codes: 02666
- Vehicle registration: WW
- Website: www.wallmerod.de

Kuhnhöfen is an Ortsgemeinde – a community belonging to a Verbandsgemeinde – in the Westerwaldkreis in Rhineland-Palatinate, Germany. It belongs to the Verbandsgemeinde of Wallmerod, a kind of collective municipality.

== Geography ==
The community lies in the Westerwald in the Westerwald Lake Plateau drainage basin.

== History ==
In 1590, Kuhnhöfen had its first documentary mention as Cunhoff uff der Steinen.

== Politics ==
The municipal council is made up of 6 council members who were elected in a majority vote in a municipal election on 13 June 2004.

== Economy and infrastructure ==
Right near the community runs Bundesstraße 8, linking Limburg an der Lahn and Hennef (Sieg). The nearest Autobahn interchange is Montabaur on the A 3 (Cologne–Frankfurt), some 11 km away. The nearest InterCityExpress stop is the railway station at Montabaur on the Cologne-Frankfurt high-speed rail line.
