= Wallmerod (Verbandsgemeinde) =

- Verbandsgemeinde
- Coat of arms

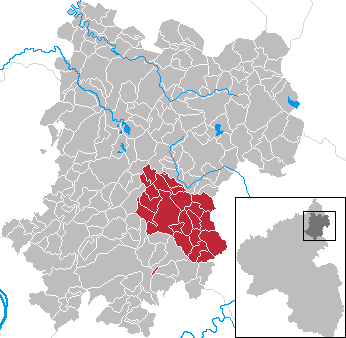
- Location of Wallmerod within Westerwaldkreis district
- Interactive map of Wallmerod
- Location within Germany Location within Rhineland-Palatinate
- Coordinates: 50°29′08″N 7°57′06″E
- Country: Germany
- State: Rhineland-Palatinate
- District: Westerwaldkreis
- Subdivisions: 21 municipalities

Government
  - Mayor (2017–25): Klaus Lütkefedder (CDU)

Area
  - Total: 82.94 km^{2} (32.02 sq mi)

Population (2025-12-31)
  - Total: 14,631
  - Density: 176.4/km^{2} (456.9/sq mi)
- Time zone: UTC+01:00 (CET)
  - Summer (DST): UTC+02:00 (CEST)
- Website: www.wallmerod.de

Wallmerod is a Verbandsgemeinde ("collective municipality") in the district Westerwaldkreis, in Rhineland-Palatinate, Germany. The seat of the Verbandsgemeinde is in Wallmerod.

== History ==
The collective municipality of Wallmerod was formed on 1 March 1972, from 15 local communities of the Oberwesterwald circle and five municipalities in the Unterwesterwaldkreis. It was thus initially in the field of two districts, which changed in 1974 when the Westerwaldkreis had been established. Wallmerod was chosen as the administrative headquarters, because of its history as the seat of a local court.

The community Hundsangen wanted to go to the neighboring federal land Hesse, which, however, failed due to the non-issuance of the appropriate authorization from Rhineland-Palatinate. This request was made at the request of citizens who do consider themselves to be the Palatinate rather than Rhinelanders.

On 1 January 1994 the municipalities Elbingen and Mähren (Westerwald), that had been combined into the municipality Elbingen-Mähren in 1969, became separate municipalities, but remained in the collective municipality.

== Municipalities ==
The Verbandsgemeinde Wallmerod consists of the following Ortsgemeinden ("local municipalities"):

- Arnshöfen
- Berod bei Wallmerod
- Bilkheim
- Dreikirchen
- Elbingen
- Ettinghausen
- Hahn am See
- Herschbach, Wallmerod
- Hundsangen
- Kuhnhöfen
- Mähren
- Meudt
- Molsberg
- Niederahr
- Oberahr
- Obererbach
- Salz
- Steinefrenz
- Wallmerod
- Weroth
- Zehnhausen bei Wallmerod
