= Molsberg (Germany) =

- Municipality
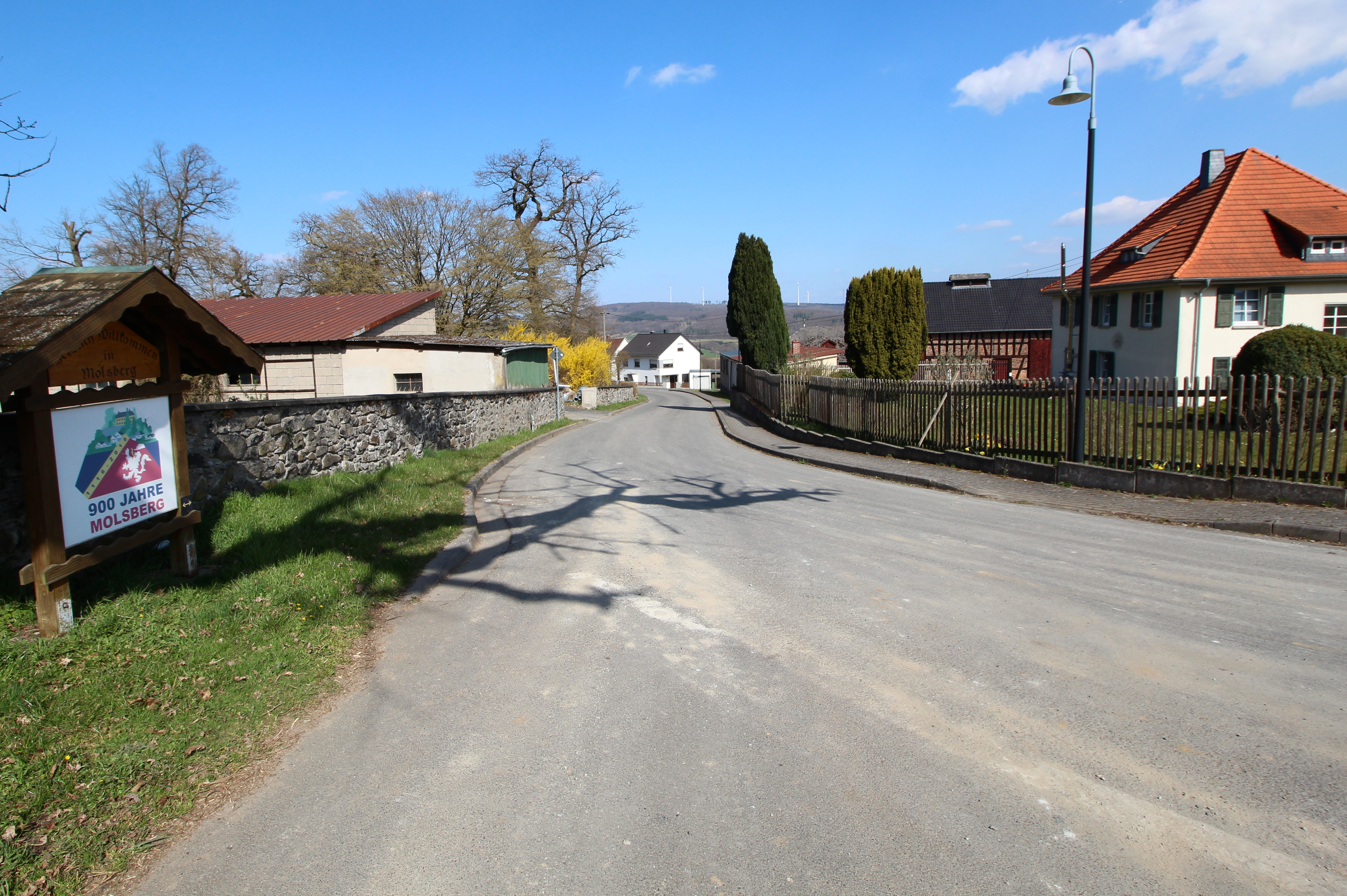

- Coat of arms

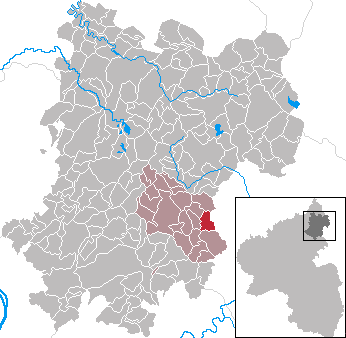
- Location of Molsberg within Westerwaldkreis district
- Interactive map of Molsberg
- Location within Germany Location within Rhineland-Palatinate
- Coordinates: 50°28′59″N 7°58′7″E
- Country: Germany
- State: Rhineland-Palatinate
- District: Westerwaldkreis
- Municipal assoc.: Wallmerod

Government
  - Mayor (2019–24): Dieter Glässer

Area
  - Total: 3.65 km^{2} (1.41 sq mi)
- Elevation: 350 m (1,150 ft)

Population (2025-12-31)
  - Total: 442
  - Density: 121/km^{2} (314/sq mi)
- Time zone: UTC+01:00 (CET)
  - Summer (DST): UTC+02:00 (CEST)
- Postal codes: 56414
- Dialling codes: 06435
- Vehicle registration: WW
- Website: www.wallmerod.de

Molsberg is an Ortsgemeinde – a community belonging to a Verbandsgemeinde – in the Westerwaldkreis in Rhineland-Palatinate, Germany.

== Geography ==
The community lies in the Westerwald on the boundary with the neighbouring Bundesland of Hessen. It belongs to the Verbandsgemeinde of Wallmerod, a kind of collective municipality. Its seat is in the like-named town.

== History ==
In 1030, Molsberg had its first documentary mention.

From 1030, the Knights of Molsberg had their seat here on the north slope of the Eichberg (405 m) at their castle. The model of the castle may still be seen today at Schloß Molsberg (residential castle).

In 1458, Count Philipp the Elder of Katzenelnbogen released for the 12,000 gulden by which he had raised his daughter Anna's dowry, a parcel of land to Limburg, Molsberg and Brechen from Count Reinhard of Solms and Frank of Kronberg to whom Landgrave Ludwig of Hesse had pledged it. The von Walderdorff noble family had its seat in Molsberg as of 1657.

== Politics ==
=== Community council ===
The council is made up of 8 council members who were elected in a majority vote in a municipal election on 13 June 2004.

=== Coat of arms ===
The community's arms might heraldically be described thus: Gules a lion rampant argent armed and langued Or. These arms are demonstrably akin to the 1662 court seal. The noble lords of Molsberg had a coat of arms that was first mentioned in 1347 and showed a silver lion on a red field with a golden tongue, accompanied by a blue triple-etched gorget.

== Culture and sightseeing ==
In the middle of the village stands the renovated former village school from 1830, which today serves as the mayor's office. Opposite stands the former seat of the Schultheiß (roughly, “sheriff”) in a more than 300-year-old timber-frame house.

Schloss Molsberg was built in 1760 on the former castle's site and has at its disposal a park with trees that are under monumental protection.

=== Regular events ===
At Whitsun the traditional Pfingstkirmes (Whitsun kermis) is held. On Whit Monday, an open-air church service is held if the weather is fair, and this is followed by a Corpus Christi procession, in turn followed by a Frühschoppen (a morning drink or brunch) with a concert in the square in the castle laneway under the old lindens of the Counts of Walderdorff. After prayers in the castle chapel, the kermis youth's parade begins. First at the Count's, then at the mayor's and finally in the lower village, the kermis youth dance. Here all kinds of funny anecdotes from the past year are told. The kermis festivities then move farther on to the school field.

In the summer in the Counts’ castle laneway, the Kaffeehausnachmittag (“Coffeehouse Afternoon”) is held by the Wallmerod collective municipality's cultural promotion club. To the sound of waltzes, coffee and cake are served in the shade afforded by the lindens.

As a general rule, the tradition-rich Molsberger Markt (market) is held on the second Saturday in October. In 2007, however, on organizational grounds, it was moved up to 29 September.

== Economy and infrastructure ==
Molsberg is located in the transport association Verkehrsverbund Rhein-Mosel, VRM, zone number 423. Just west of the community runs Bundesstraße 8, linking Limburg an der Lahn and Hennef. The nearest Autobahn interchange is Diez on the A 3 (Cologne–Frankfurt), some 10 km away. The nearest InterCityExpress stops are the railway stations at Montabaur and Limburg an der Lahn on the Cologne-Frankfurt high-speed rail line.

== Notable people ==
- Johann Philipp von Walderdorff (born 1701 at Schloss Molsberg; died 1768) was as Johann IX from 1756 to 1768 Archbishop and Elector of Trier.
