= Berod bei Wallmerod =

- Municipality
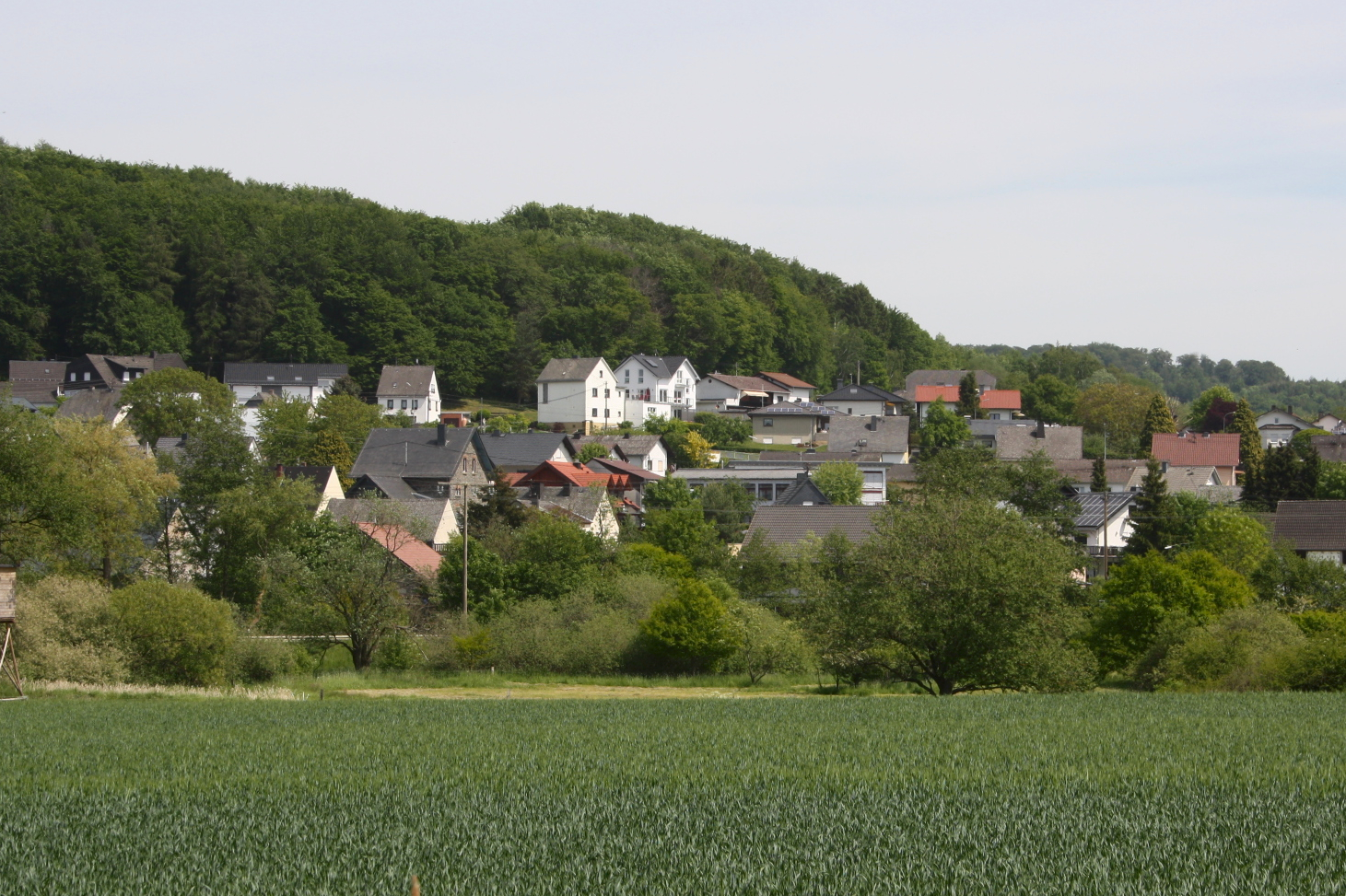

- Coat of arms

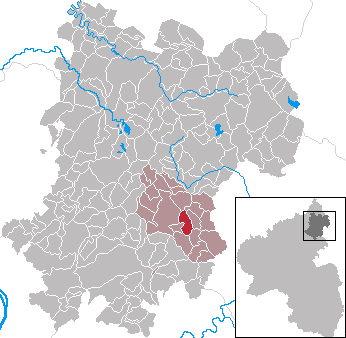
- Location of Berod bei Wallmerod within Westerwaldkreis district
- Interactive map of Berod bei Wallmerod
- Location within Germany Location within Rhineland-Palatinate
- Coordinates: 50°28′54″N 7°56′10″E
- Country: Germany
- State: Rhineland-Palatinate
- District: Westerwaldkreis
- Municipal assoc.: Wallmerod

Government
  - Mayor (2019–24): Collin Schmidt

Area
  - Total: 3.92 km^{2} (1.51 sq mi)
- Elevation: 300 m (980 ft)

Population (2025-12-31)
  - Total: 553
  - Density: 141/km^{2} (365/sq mi)
- Time zone: UTC+01:00 (CET)
  - Summer (DST): UTC+02:00 (CEST)
- Postal codes: 56414
- Dialling codes: 06435
- Vehicle registration: WW
- Website: www.wallmerod.de

Berod bei Wallmerod is an Ortsgemeinde – a municipality belonging to a Verbandsgemeinde – in the Westerwaldkreis in Rhineland-Palatinate, Germany.

== Geography ==
The municipality lies in the Westerwald between Montabaur and Wetzlar. Through the municipality from north to south flows the Eisenbach. The municipality belongs to the Verbandsgemeinde of Wallmerod, a kind of collective municipality.

== History ==
In 1292, Berod had its first documentary mention as Berrinrode.

== Politics ==
The municipal council is made up of 12 council members who were elected in a majority vote in the municipal election on 7 June 2009.

== Economy and infrastructure ==
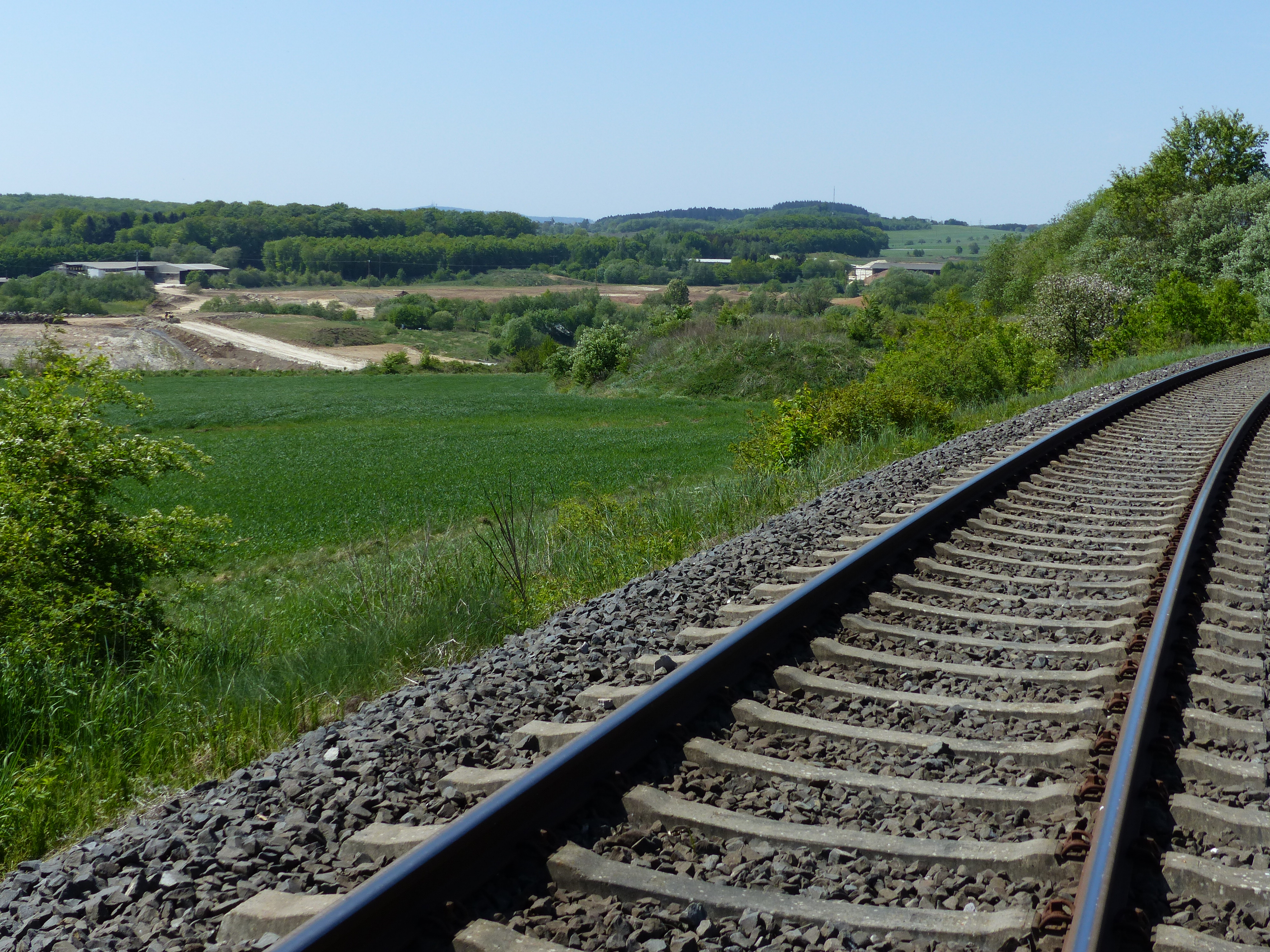
Track of Cross Westerwald railway close to Berod

Right near the municipality runs Bundesstraße 8 linking Altenkirchen (Westerwald) and Limburg an der Lahn. The nearest Autobahn interchange is Diez on the A 3 (Cologne–Frankfurt am Main), some 10 km away. The nearest InterCityExpress stop is at the railway station at Montabaur on the Cologne-Frankfurt high-speed rail line.

The Cross Westerwald railway passes Berod, although nowadays it is only in service for fright trains from Montabaur to Wallmerod.

The village is located in the transport association Verkehrsverbund Rhein-Mosel, zone number 423.
