= Mähren =

- Municipality
- Coat of arms

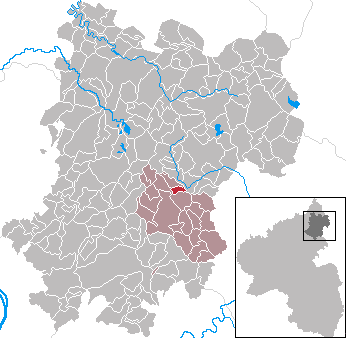
- Location of Mähren within Westerwaldkreis district
- Interactive map of Mähren
- Location within Germany Location within Rhineland-Palatinate
- Coordinates: 50°31′24″N 7°55′21″E
- Country: Germany
- State: Rhineland-Palatinate
- District: Westerwaldkreis
- Municipal assoc.: Wallmerod

Government
  - Mayor (2019–24): Volker Solbach

Area
  - Total: 1.59 km^{2} (0.61 sq mi)
- Elevation: 342 m (1,122 ft)

Population (2025-12-31)
  - Total: 210
  - Density: 130/km^{2} (340/sq mi)
- Time zone: UTC+01:00 (CET)
  - Summer (DST): UTC+02:00 (CEST)
- Postal codes: 56459
- Dialling codes: 06435
- Vehicle registration: WW
- Website: www.wallmerod.de

Mähren (German pronunciation: [ˈmɛːʁən]) is an Ortsgemeinde – a municipality belonging to a Verbandsgemeinde – in the Westerwaldkreis in Rhineland-Palatinate, Germany.

== Geography ==
The municipality lies in the Westerwald between Montabaur and Westerburg. Mähren is a residential village and belongs to the Verbandsgemeinde of Wallmerod, a kind of collective municipality.

== History ==
In 1508, Mähren had its first documentary mention as Mern.

== Politics ==
The municipal council is made up of 6 council members who were elected in a majority vote in municipal elections every 5 years.

Since 2007, Volker Solbach has been the mayor of Mähren. He took over from Josef Ortseifen.

== Economy and infrastructure ==
The local bus line 973 connects the village with Salz and Westerburg, it is located in the zone number 424 of the transport association VRM (Verkehrsverbund Rhein-Mosel).

Right near the municipality runs Bundesstraße 8, linking Limburg an der Lahn and Hennef. The nearest Autobahn interchange is Montabaur on the A 3 (Cologne–Frankfurt), some 13 km away. The nearest InterCityExpress stop is the railway station at Montabaur on the Cologne-Frankfurt high-speed rail line.
