= Steinefrenz =

- Municipality
- Coat of arms

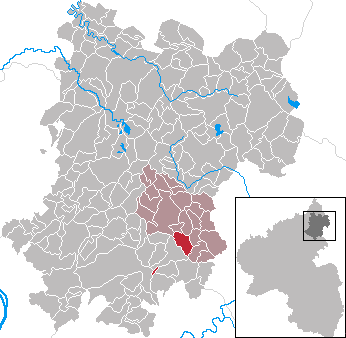
- Location of Steinefrenz within Westerwaldkreis district
- Interactive map of Steinefrenz
- Location within Germany Location within Rhineland-Palatinate
- Coordinates: 50°27′33″N 07°55′57″E
- Country: Germany
- State: Rhineland-Palatinate
- District: Westerwaldkreis
- Municipal assoc.: Wallmerod

Government
  - Mayor (2019–24): Michael Hannappel

Area
  - Total: 4.86 km^{2} (1.88 sq mi)
- Elevation: 275 m (902 ft)

Population (2025-12-31)
  - Total: 761
  - Density: 157/km^{2} (406/sq mi)
- Time zone: UTC+01:00 (CET)
  - Summer (DST): UTC+02:00 (CEST)
- Postal codes: 56414
- Dialling codes: 06435
- Vehicle registration: WW
- Website: www.steinefrenz.de

Steinefrenz is an Ortsgemeinde – a community belonging to a Verbandsgemeinde – in the Westerwaldkreis in Rhineland-Palatinate, Germany.

Steinefrenz is located in the administrative district Westerwaldkreis and has a population of 803 people (Dec. 2020).

== Geography ==
The community is located within the Westerwald, between Montabaur and Limburg an der Lahn and 25 km away from Koblenz. It is associated to the Verbandsgemeinde of Wallmerod an association of municipalities having its seat in the same-named town.

== History ==
In 959 Steinefrenz had its first documentary mention as Brencede.

== Politics ==
The municipal council is made up of 12 council members who are elected for a period of four years in a majority vote in a municipal election.

== Economy and infrastructure ==
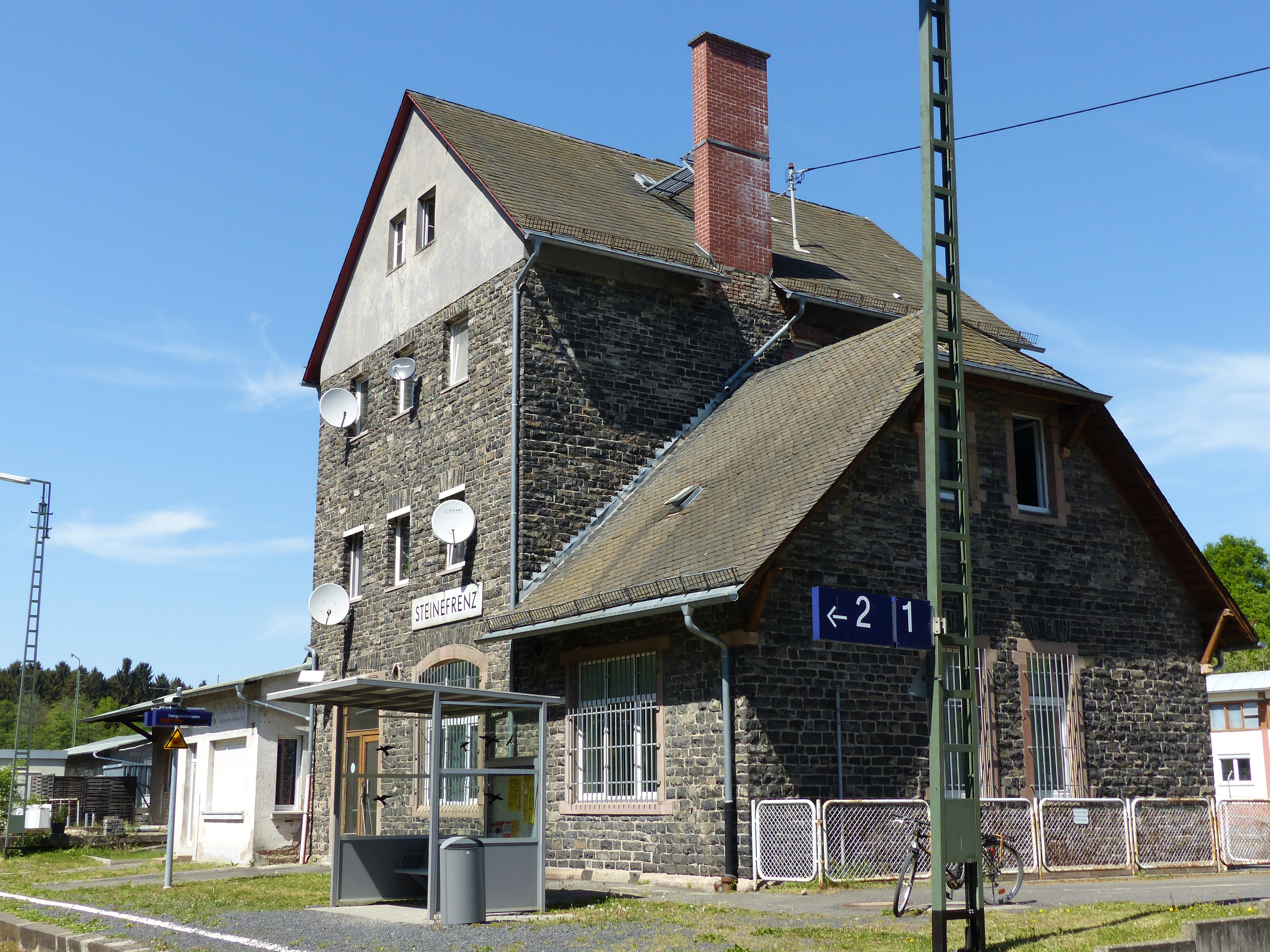
Steinefrenz train station

East of the community runs Bundesstraße 8, linking Limburg an der Lahn and Hennef. The nearest Autobahn interchange is Diez on the A 3 (Cologne–Frankfurt), some 7 km away. The nearest InterCityExpress stops are Montabaur station and Limburg Süd station on the Cologne-Frankfurt high-speed rail line. It has a station on the Lower Westerwald Railway Unterwesterwaldbahn from Limburg to Siershahn, serviced thorugh DreiLänderBahn, a section of Hessische Landesbahn (HLB). Steinefrenz is located in the area of the transport association Verkehrsverbund Rhein-Mosel (VRM), zone number 410.
