= Bilkheim =

- Municipality
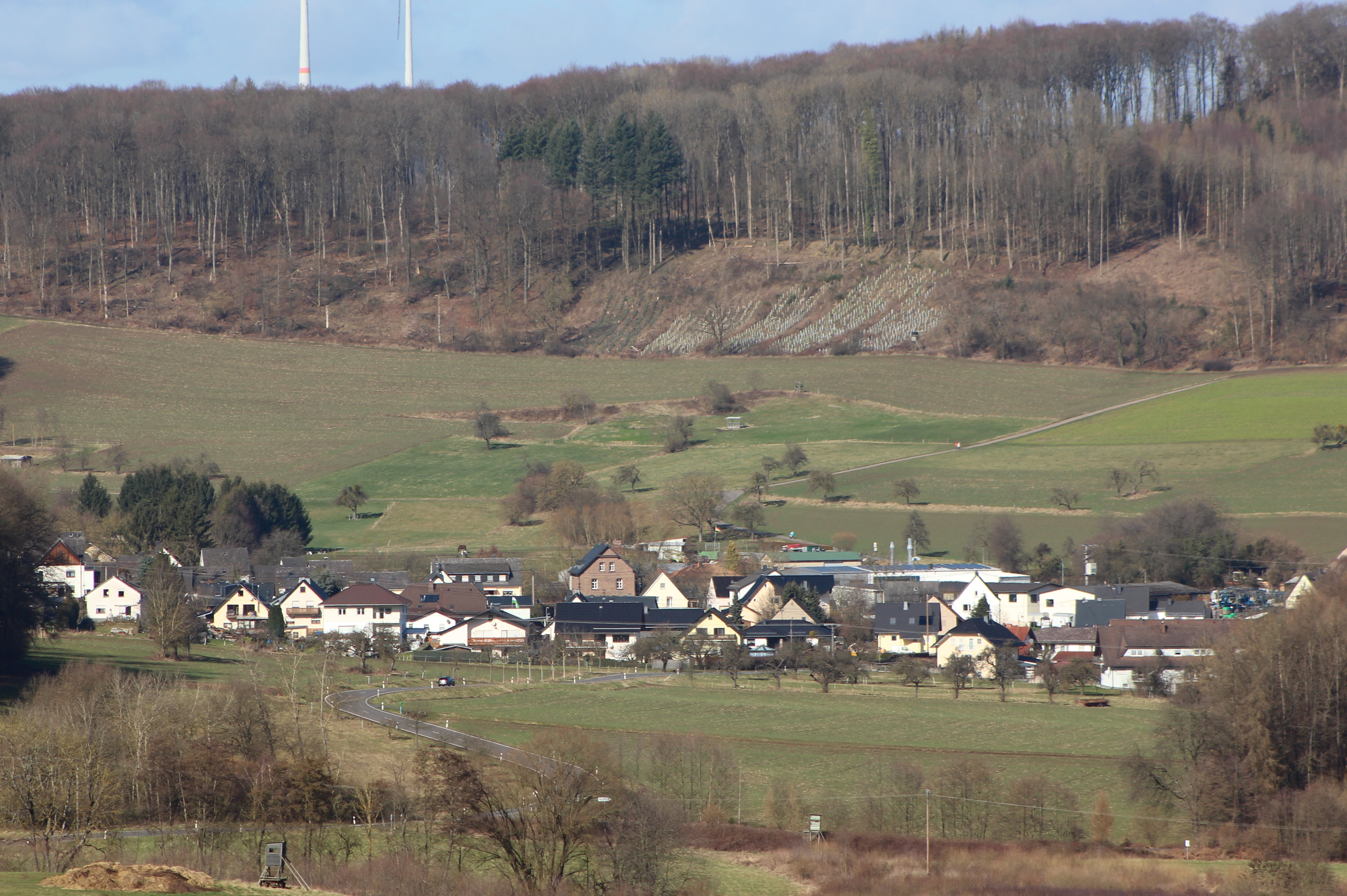

- Coat of arms

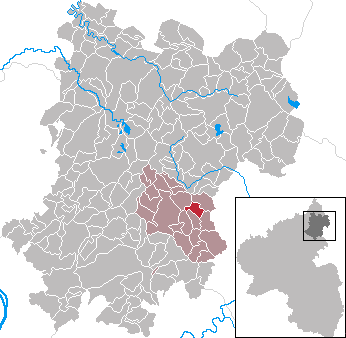
- Location of Bilkheim within Westerwaldkreis district
- Interactive map of Bilkheim
- Location within Germany Location within Rhineland-Palatinate
- Coordinates: 50°29′53″N 7°56′54″E
- Country: Germany
- State: Rhineland-Palatinate
- District: Westerwaldkreis
- Municipal assoc.: Wallmerod

Government
  - Mayor (2019–24): Wilhelm Krings

Area
  - Total: 2.66 km^{2} (1.03 sq mi)
- Elevation: 295 m (968 ft)

Population (2025-12-31)
  - Total: 458
  - Density: 172/km^{2} (446/sq mi)
- Time zone: UTC+01:00 (CET)
  - Summer (DST): UTC+02:00 (CEST)
- Postal codes: 56414
- Dialling codes: 06435
- Vehicle registration: WW
- Website: www.wallmerod.de

Bilkheim (German pronunciation: [ˈbɪlkhaɪm]) is an Ortsgemeinde – a municipality belonging to a Verbandsgemeinde – in the Westerwaldkreis in Rhineland-Palatinate, Germany.

== Geography ==
Bilkheim lies roughly 13 km northeast of Montabaur in a basin, right on the boundary with Hesse. The Schafbach rises above the village, flows alongside Bilkheim and empties into the Salzbach. The municipality belongs to the Verbandsgemeinde of Wallmerod, a kind of collective municipality.

== History ==
In 1345, Bilkheim had its first documentary mention by the nobleman Dietrich von Brambach zu Neurod under the name Bullincheym.

In 1664, the moated castle of Neuroth was built by the House of Walderdorff as a widow's seat. A gravestone from the year 1695 with the placename Bilkheim on it was once found.

In 1828, the first urn graves from the Hallstatt culture (700-500 BC) were discovered on the “heath”. From these grave finds there is support for the belief that there must already have been settlers in the Bilkheim area well over 2,000 years ago.

These finds are in part displayed or archived at the Museum in Wiesbaden.

In 1901, a school was built in Bilkheim, which is now privately owned.

A railway, since converted into a cycling and hiking path, once linked Bilkheim to the rest of the world as of 1910.

== Religion ==
Originally, Bilkheim's religion was, until about 50 years ago, Roman Catholicism, with a membership of 100%. Since the onset of globalization, however, many faiths have become represented in Bilkheim since then.

== Population development ==
The old houses along the main street have mainly been bought up by “new” Bilkheimers, who now live in them. “Old” Bilkheimers’ children move out of the municipality's centre and build in the outlying new areas.

=== municipality council ===
The council is made up of 8 council members who were elected in a majority vote in a municipal election on 7 June 2009.

== Economy and infrastructure ==
Bilkheim is located in the zone number 429 of the local transport association Verkehrsverbund Rhein-Mosel (VRM). Local bus lines serving Bilkheim are 482, 492 and 959. The nearest Autobahn interchange is Diez on the A 3 (Cologne–Frankfurt, some 10 km away. The nearest train stop is in Willmenrod at the Limburg-Altenkirchen railway, the nearest InterCityExpress stop is the railway station at Montabaur on the Cologne-Frankfurt high-speed rail line. The nearest major airports are Cologne Bonn Airport and Frankfurt Airport.

== Regular events ==
Each year, Bilkheim has three great events:

- Kermis: On the last weekend in August each year, the traditional kermis (Kirmes) is held at the St. Barbara municipality house.
- Backesfest: The “Bakehouse Festival” is held each year on the last weekend in July and is moulded by every club in the municipality.
- Christmas market: The Weihnachtsmarkt was held for the first time in December 2006, and was very popular among both Bilkheimers and guests.
