= Herschbach, Wallmerod =

Herschbach
- Municipality
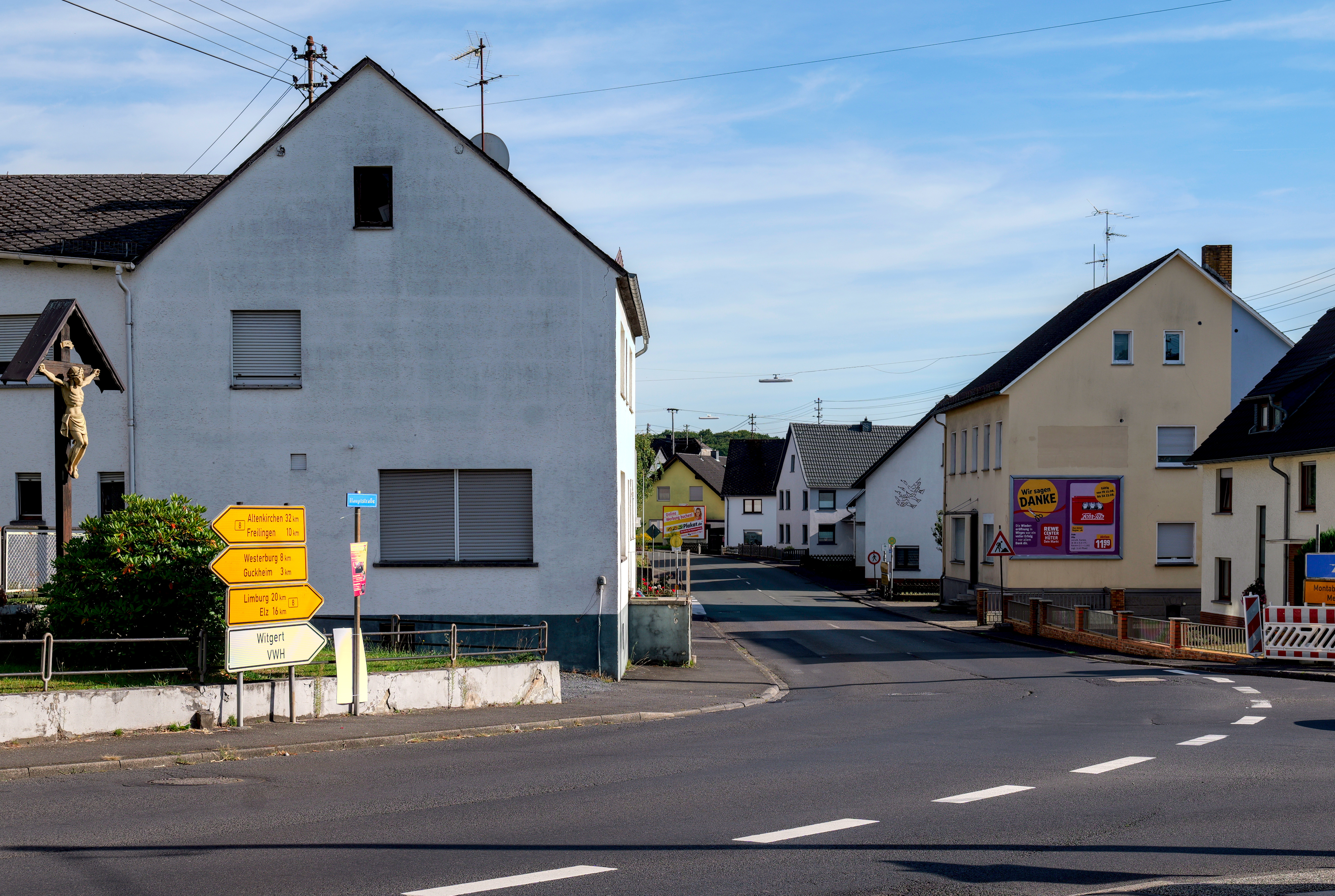

- Coat of arms

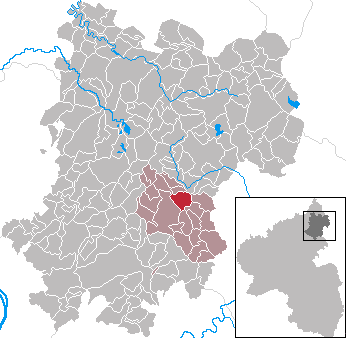
- Location of Herschbach within Westerwaldkreis district
- Interactive map of Herschbach
- Location within Germany Location within Rhineland-Palatinate
- Coordinates: 50°30′21″N 7°55′43″E
- Country: Germany
- State: Rhineland-Palatinate
- District: Westerwaldkreis
- Municipal assoc.: Wallmerod
- Subdivisions: 2

Government
  - Mayor (2019–24): Christof Kegler

Area
  - Total: 4.63 km^{2} (1.79 sq mi)
- Elevation: 318 m (1,043 ft)

Population (2025-12-31)
  - Total: 961
  - Density: 208/km^{2} (538/sq mi)
- Time zone: UTC+01:00 (CET)
  - Summer (DST): UTC+02:00 (CEST)
- Postal codes: 56414
- Dialling codes: 06435
- Vehicle registration: WW
- Website: Herschbach

Herschbach (Oberwesterwald) (German pronunciation: [ˈhɛʁʃbax]) is an Ortsgemeinde – a municipality belonging to a Verbandsgemeinde – in the Westerwaldkreis in Rhineland-Palatinate, Germany. It belongs to the Verbandsgemeinde of Wallmerod, a kind of collective municipality.

== Geography ==
The municipality lies in the Westerwald between Montabaur and Hachenburg. Herschbach has two outlying centres named Wahnscheid and Lochheim.

== History ==
In 1290, Herschbach had its first documentary mention as Haderichsbach.

== Politics ==
The municipal council is made up of 12 council members who were elected in a majority vote in a municipal election on 7 June 2009.

== Economy and infrastructure ==
Herschbach is located in the zone 423 of the transport association Verkehrsverbund Rhein-Mosel (VRM).

Running right through the municipality is Bundesstraße 8, linking Limburg an der Lahn and Hennef (Sieg). The nearest Autobahn interchange is Montabaur on the A 3 (Cologne–Frankfurt), some 11 km.

Herschbach was connected to the Cross Westerwald railway (Montabaur - Wallmerod - Westerburg - Rennerod - Herborn), but nowadays this line between Montabaur and Wallmerod is only in service for fright trains and from Fehl-Ritzhausen to Rennerod station touristic railbike tours take place, organized by the interest group IG Westerwald-Querbahn e. V. (IWQ).

Today nearest train stops are Steinefrenz (line RB29) and Westerburg (line RB90).

The nearest InterCityExpress stop is the railway station at Montabaur on the Cologne-Frankfurt high-speed rail line.
