= Wallmerod station =

Wallmerod
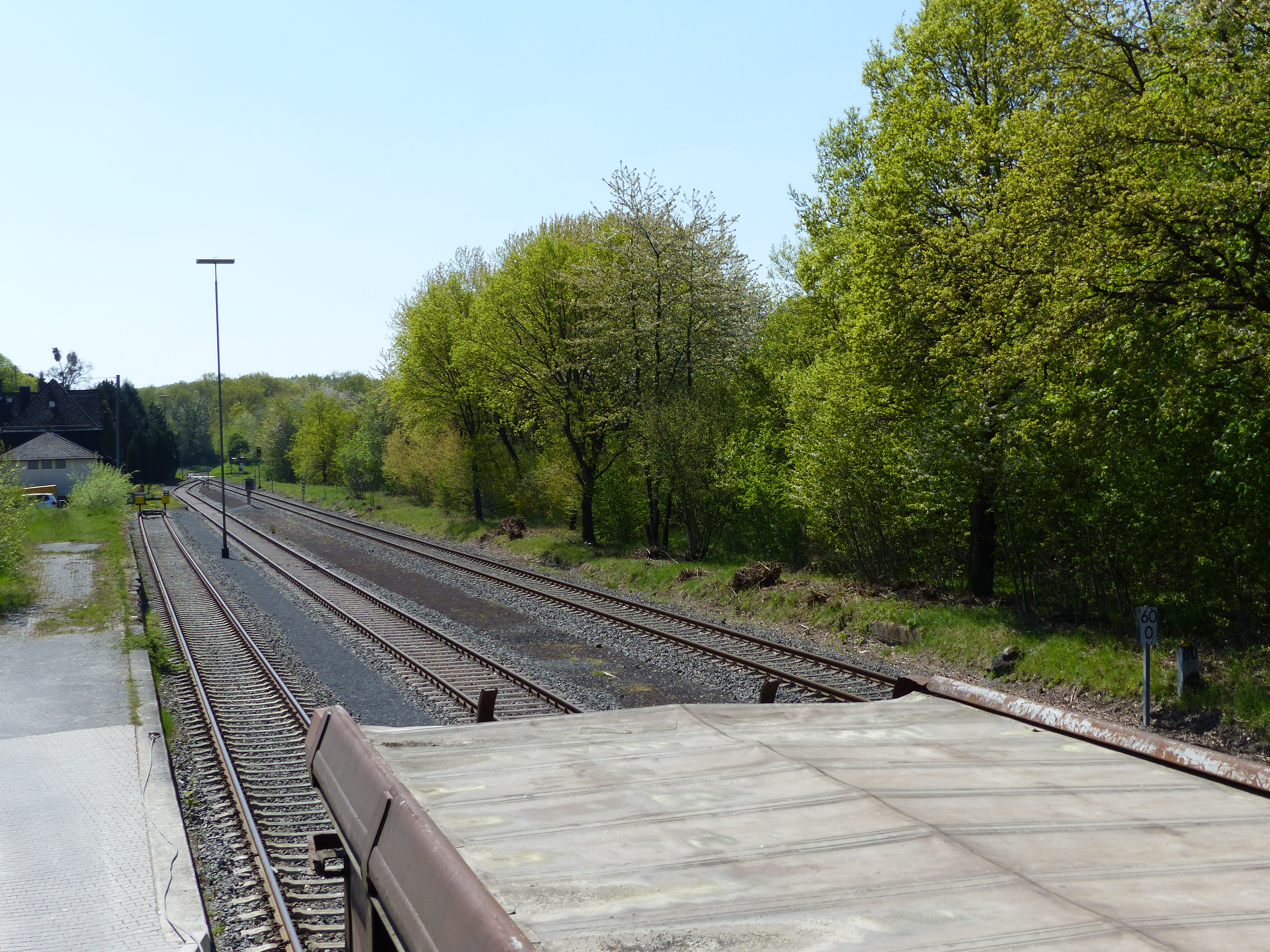

General information
- Location: Wallmerod, Rhineland-Palatinate; Germany
- Coordinates: 50°29′36″N 7°56′38″E
- Line: Herborn–Montabaur (km 60.1)
- Platforms: 2

Other information
- Station code: n/a
- DS100 code: FWMD

History
- Opened: 1910
- Closed: 1981 (passenger train service)
Location

Wallmerod station is a station on the Herborn–Montabaur railway (also called in German the Westerwaldquerbahn, Cross-Westerwald Railway), currently closed for passenger transport but still used for freight transport. The station opened on 1 June 1910, alongside the Montabaur–Westerburg section of the Herborn–Montabaur railway line. Passenger services were discontinued on 1 June 1955.

On 18 September 2005, the interest group IG Westerwald Querbahn e. V. (IWQ) organized the first special excursion on the line, using VT 98 railbuses chartered from the interest group Oberhessische Eisenbahnfreunde (OEF e. V.). The trip, originating from Montabaur station and terminating at Wallmerod station, passed the villages Bannberscheid, Staudt, Moschheim, Niederahr and Meudt. Similar excursions were offered again in the years 2006, 2007, and 2010.

Nowadays a walking and cycling path runs along the former railway alignment from Wallmerod station towards Westerburg station.

The station building is privately owned.

== Location ==
Wallmerod station is located outside the main town in the "Bahnhof Wallmerod" settlement area, between Wallmerod and Herschbach along the federal highway 8.
