= Dreikirchen =

- Municipality
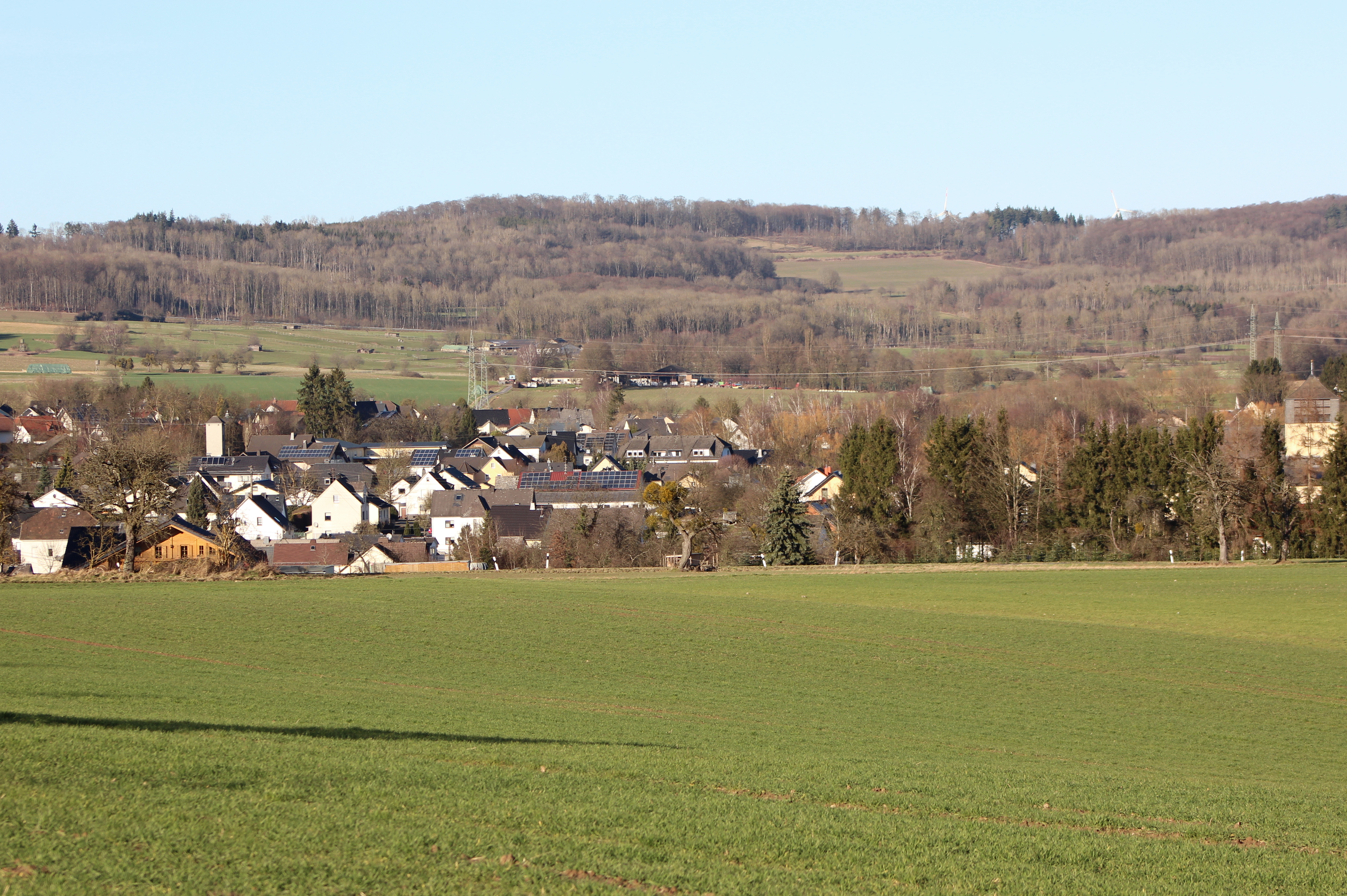

- Coat of arms

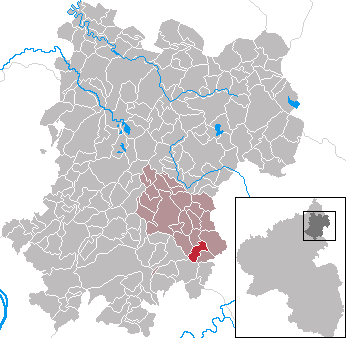
- Location of Dreikirchen within Westerwaldkreis district
- Interactive map of Dreikirchen
- Location within Germany Location within Rhineland-Palatinate
- Coordinates: 50°26′49″N 7°57′19″E
- Country: Germany
- State: Rhineland-Palatinate
- District: Westerwaldkreis
- Municipal assoc.: Wallmerod
- Subdivisions: 2

Government
  - Mayor (2019–24): Volker Hannappel

Area
  - Total: 3.70 km^{2} (1.43 sq mi)
- Elevation: 245 m (804 ft)

Population (2025-12-31)
  - Total: 1,013
  - Density: 274/km^{2} (709/sq mi)
- Time zone: UTC+01:00 (CET)
  - Summer (DST): UTC+02:00 (CEST)
- Postal codes: 56414
- Dialling codes: 06435
- Vehicle registration: WW
- Website: www.wallmerod.de

Dreikirchen is an Ortsgemeinde – a municipality belonging to a Verbandsgemeinde – in the Westerwaldkreis in Rhineland-Palatinate, Germany.

== Geography ==
=== Location ===
Dreikirchen is a residential municipality with some industry. Since 1994, Dreikirchen has been a stronghold in the realm of village renewal. Many improvement measures have already been undertaken; some are in the planning stages, and others have been realized. The municipality lies in the southern Verbandsgemeinde of Wallmerod, a kind of collective municipality.

=== Amalgamations ===
Dreikirchen came into being through the amalgamation of the formerly autonomous Ortsgemeinden of Pütschbach and Oberhausen. In the course of administrative reform – namely the formation of the Verbandsgemeinden in Rhineland-Palatinate – the two former communities’ councils came up with the new placename Dreikirchen. The grounds for this choice were the fortress church in the middle of Pütschbach, first mentioned in 1292, the chapel in Oberhausen and the parish church serving both places and newly built in 1957, in other words, the “three churches” (drei Kirchen in German).

=== municipality council ===
The council is made up of 16 council members who were elected in a majority vote in a municipal election on 7 June 2009.

== Coat of arms ==
The municipality's arms symbolize both former communities’ quintessential traditional features as well as Oberhausen's and Pütschbach's fusion into the new municipality of Dreikirchen in April 1969.

The silver pale and chevron combination represents the Häuserbach in Oberhausen's municipal area and the former watercourse in Pütschbach's municipal area, which symbolically flow together forming a new unity for the united municipality.

Until 1564, Dreikirchen belonged to the Nassau Counts’ domain, after which it passed to the Electorate of Trier. In the 19th century, it belonged to the Duchy of Nassau and thereafter to the Prussian province of Hesse-Nassau. Each of these is documented by an heraldic tincture, namely blue for the municipality's main membership in Nassau, and red for the Electorate of Trier. Here is also found the municipality's name in the three stylized silver steeples. The middle and predominant tower refers to the fortress church from the 12th century, the one on the left stands for the chapel in Oberhausen, and the one on the right once again symbolizes unity in depicting the parish church, which was meant to serve both former communities.

The dexter (ie on the armsbearer's right and therefore the viewer's left) field shows an oak sprig with two acorns representing the centuries-old oak forest in Pütschbach and nature in general, while the sinister (ie on the armsbearer's left and therefore the viewer's right) field shows some basalt columns referring to the basalt deposits in Oberhausen and the basalt mining there that goes back generations.

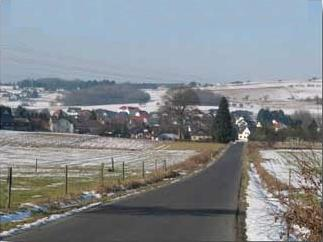
Dreikirchen seen coming from Hundsangen in winter

== Culture and sightseeing ==
=== Buildings ===
Pütschbach's fortress church has a tower from the 12th century built in the Gothic style. The rest of the building has its roots in the 13th century. In 1970 the building was renovated.

Also worth seeing is a timber-frame farmhouse built about 1700 that was brought back into use as a dwelling after renovation.

== Economy and infrastructure ==
=== Transport ===
The nearest Autobahn interchange is Diez on the A 3 (Cologne–Frankfurt), some 5 km away. Dreikirchen has a station on the Lower Westerwald Railway (RB29) Unterwesterwaldbahn from Limburg to Siershahn, operated by DreiLänderBahn, a section of Hessische Landesbahn (HLB), Dreikirchen is located in the fare zone number 410 of the transport association Verkehrsverbund Rhein-Mosel (VRM). The nearest InterCityExpress stop is Montabaur station on the Cologne-Frankfurt high-speed rail line. There are bus links towards Hadamar, Montabaur and Limburg an der Lahn. Rail connections are available to Montabaur and Limburg through connecting trains, among them the ICE.
