= Neustadt, Westerwaldkreis =

Neustadt
- Municipality
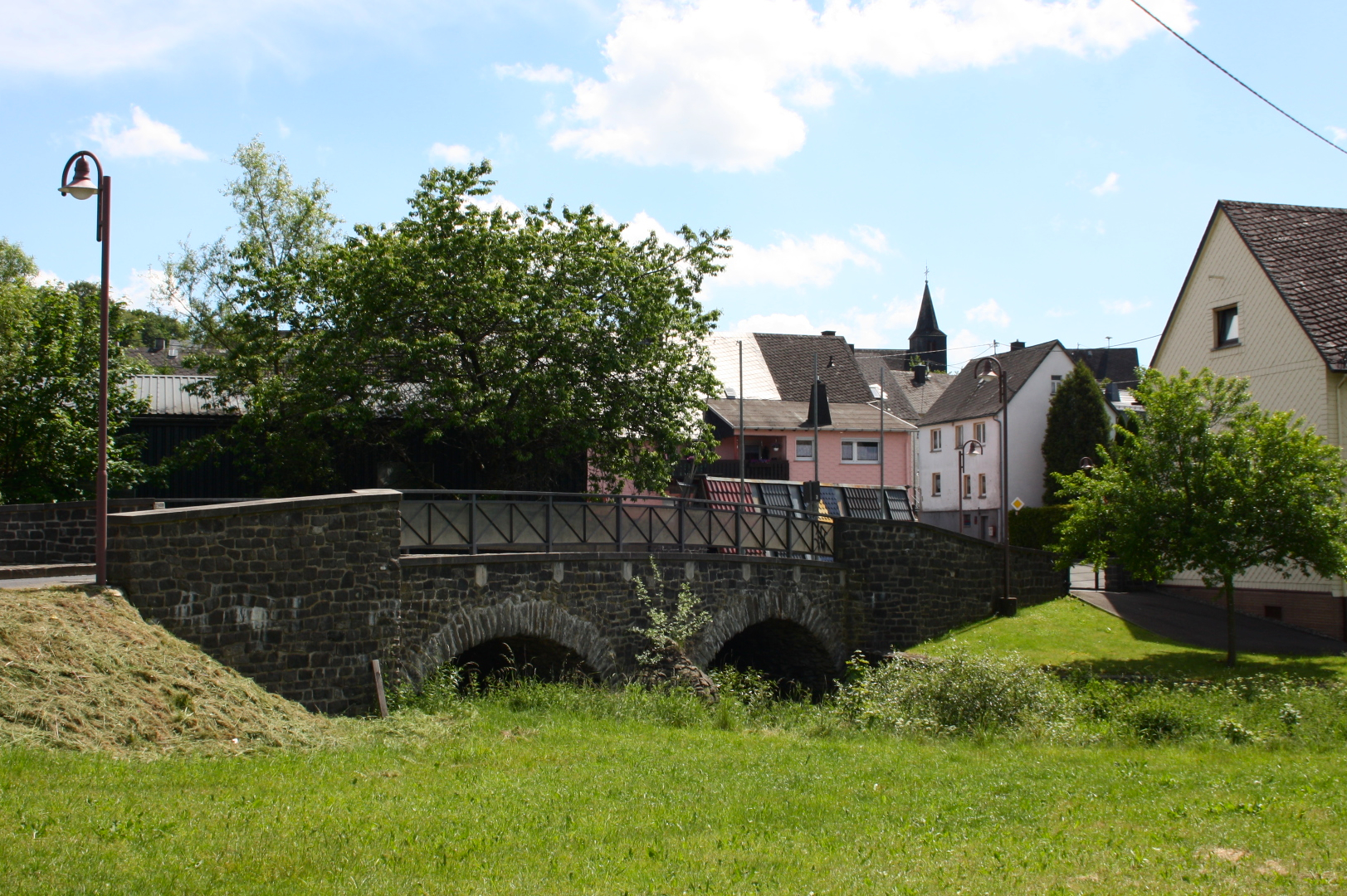

- Coat of arms

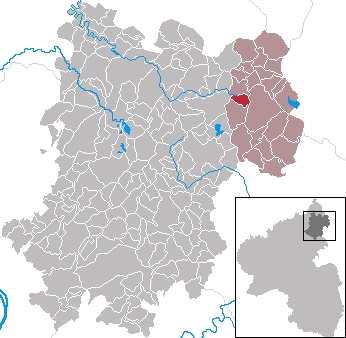
- Location of Neustadt within Westerwaldkreis district
- Interactive map of Neustadt
- Location within Germany Location within Rhineland-Palatinate
- Coordinates: 50°37′58″N 8°2′30″E
- Country: Germany
- State: Rhineland-Palatinate
- District: Westerwaldkreis
- Municipal assoc.: Rennerod

Government
  - Mayor (2019–24): Anke Schöw

Area
  - Total: 2.8 km^{2} (1.1 sq mi)
- Elevation: 496 m (1,627 ft)

Population (2025-12-31)
  - Total: 568
  - Density: 200/km^{2} (530/sq mi)
- Time zone: UTC+01:00 (CET)
  - Summer (DST): UTC+02:00 (CEST)
- Postal codes: 56479
- Dialling codes: 02664
- Vehicle registration: WW
- Website: www.rennerod.de

Neustadt/Westerwald (German pronunciation: [ˈnɔʏʃtat]) is an Ortsgemeinde – a municipality belonging to a Verbandsgemeinde – in the Westerwaldkreis in Rhineland-Palatinate, Germany.

== Geography ==
=== Location ===
The municipality lies in the Westerwald between Siegen and Limburg an der Lahn. Through the municipality flows the Große Nister. Neustadt belongs to the Verbandsgemeinde of Rennerod, a kind of collective municipality. Its seat is in the like-named town.

=== Neighbouring communities ===
Neustadt is surrounded by the communities of Niederroßbach in the north, Emmerichenhain in the east, Hellenhahn-Schellenberg in the south and Höhn in the west.

== History ==
In 1384, Neustadt/Westerwald had its first documentary mention.

=== Religion ===
Roughly 82% of the population is Catholic with the other 18% following either another or no faith.

== Politics ==
=== municipality council ===
The council is made up of 12 council members who were elected in a majority vote in a municipal election on 13 June 2004.

=== Coat of arms ===
The wavy bend sinister in the municipality's arms stands for its location on the Große Nister. The black eagle in gold – the Imperial eagle – symbolizes today's rural area of Forstwiese, which was once an Imperial forest. The waterwheel stands for the two former mills at Neustadt, which did grinding for the Neustadt-Hellenhahn-Schellenberg milling region. The tinctures gold and blue are Nassau's (golden lion in blue) and refer to the municipality's former territorial allegiance.

=== Town partnerships ===
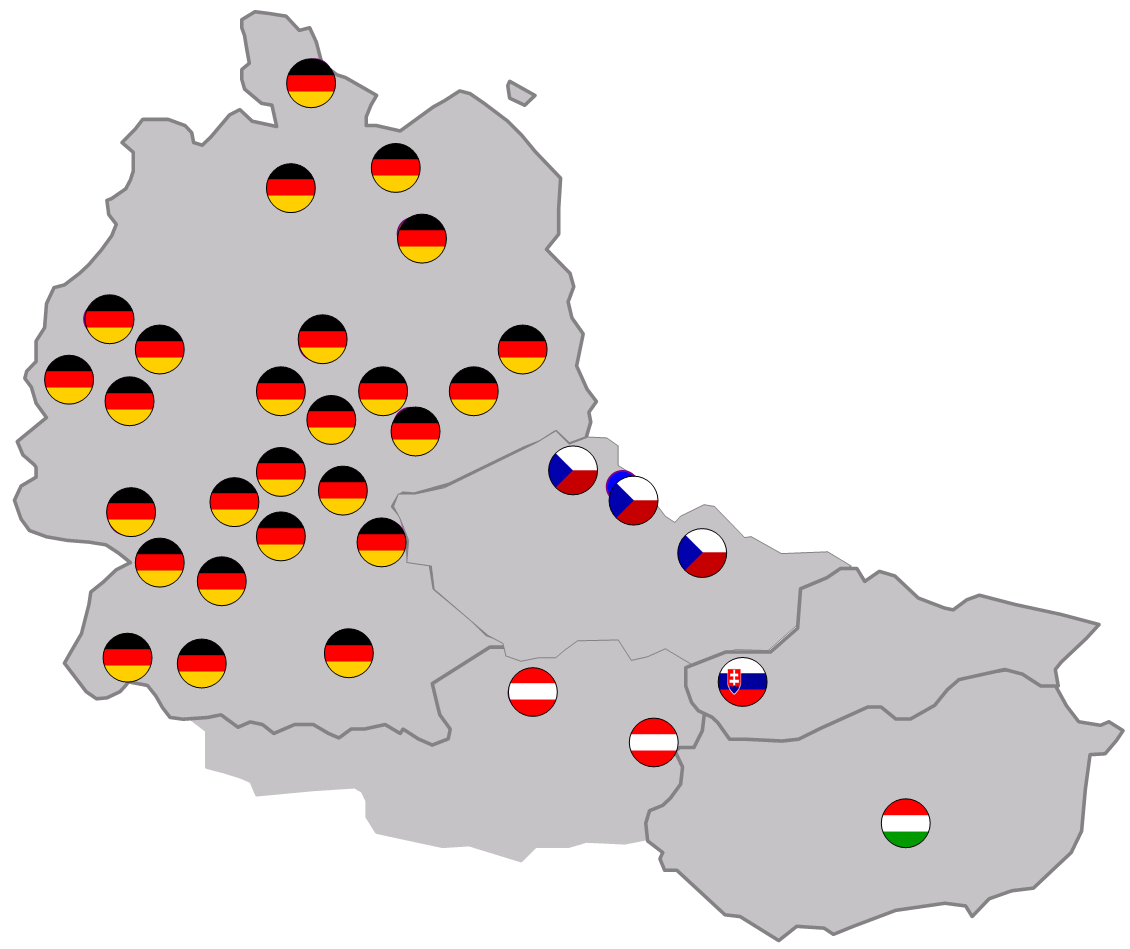
Neustadt in Europa working company, 2006

Neustadt is a member of the international town friendship group Neustadt in Europa with 34 members in five countries (as of 15 August 2005).

== Culture and sightseeing ==
- Holzbachschlucht (gorge near Seck)
- Wacholderheide (juniper heath near Westernohe)

== Economy and infrastructure ==
Neustadt is served by the local bus lines 483 (Bad Marienberg - Rennerod), 484 (Rennerod - Westerburg) and 972 (Zehnhausen - Liebenscheid). Neustadt is located in the transport association Verkehrsverbund Rhein-Mosel (VRM), zone number 445.

Right near the municipality run Bundesstraßen 54, linking Limburg an der Lahn with Siegen, and 255, leading from Montabaur to Herborn. The nearest Autobahn interchange is Haiger/Burbach on the A 45 (Dortmund–Hanau), some 18 km away.

The train station Niederroßbach-Neustadt was located at the Cross Westerwald railway (Montabaur - Wallmerod - Westerburg - Rennerod - Herborn), which is out of service for passenger trains, today the nearest accessibility to train service is Westerburg station at the Limburg-Altenkirchen railway (RB90). The nearest InterCityExpress stop is the railway station at Montabaur on the Cologne-Frankfurt high-speed rail line.
