= Oberroßbach =

- Municipality
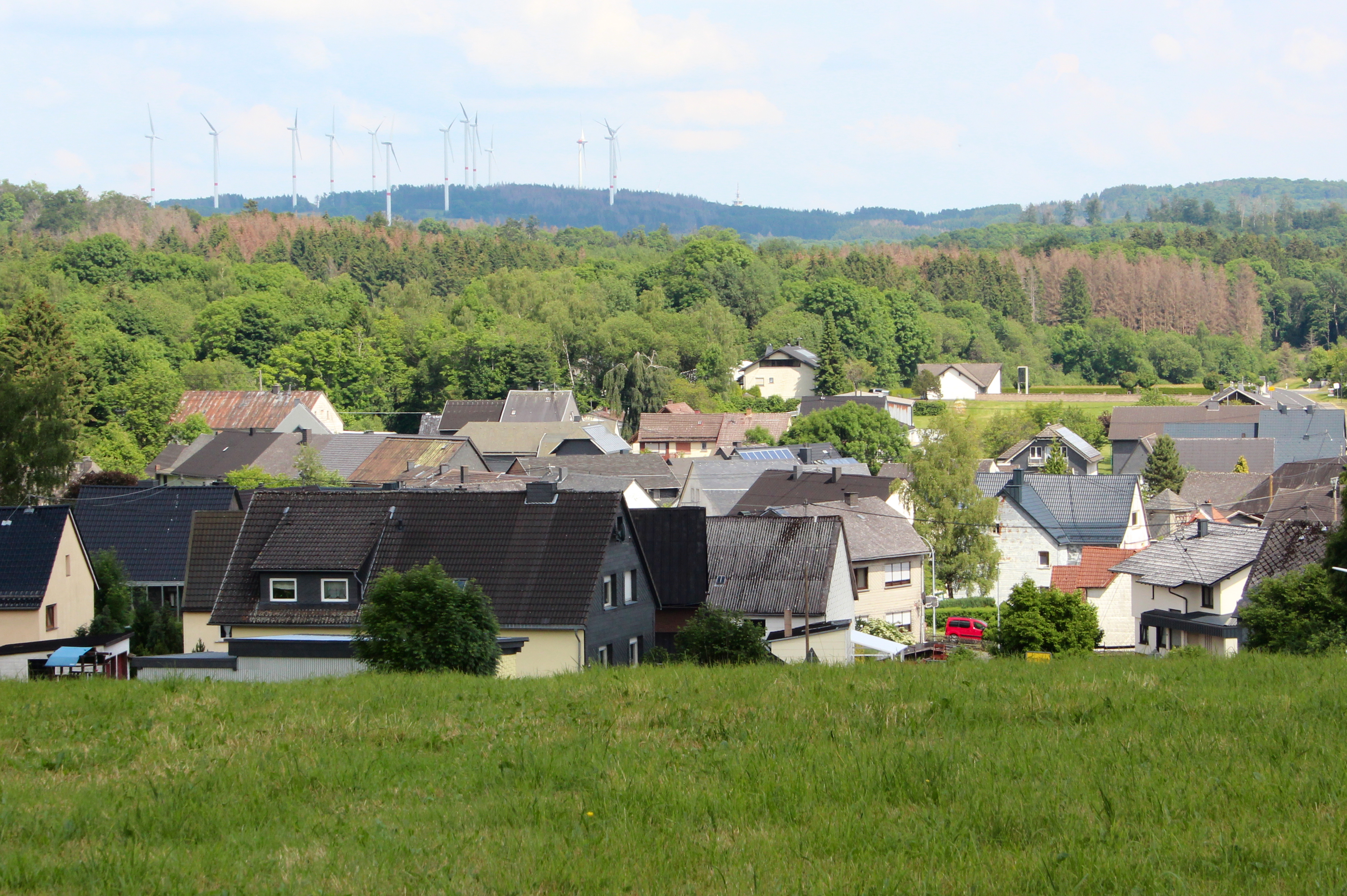

- Coat of arms

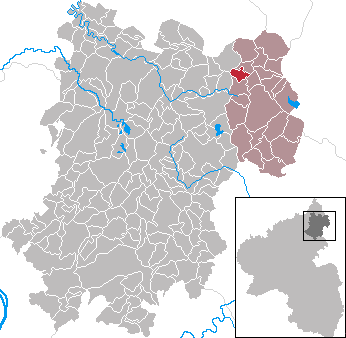
- Location of Oberroßbach within Westerwaldkreis district
- Interactive map of Oberroßbach
- Location within Germany Location within Rhineland-Palatinate
- Coordinates: 50°39′16″N 8°2′23″E
- Country: Germany
- State: Rhineland-Palatinate
- District: Westerwaldkreis
- Municipal assoc.: Rennerod

Government
  - Mayor (2019–24): Gerhard Semmelrogge

Area
  - Total: 2.81 km^{2} (1.08 sq mi)
- Elevation: 528 m (1,732 ft)

Population (2025-12-31)
  - Total: 371
  - Density: 132/km^{2} (342/sq mi)
- Time zone: UTC+01:00 (CET)
  - Summer (DST): UTC+02:00 (CEST)
- Postal codes: 56479
- Dialling codes: 02667
- Vehicle registration: WW
- Website: www.rennerod.de

Oberroßbach is an Ortsgemeinde – a community belonging to a Verbandsgemeinde – in the Westerwaldkreis in Rhineland-Palatinate, Germany.

== Geography ==
=== Location ===
The community is located in the area of Hoher Westerwald between Siegen and Limburg an der Lahn. Through the community flows the Dorfbach. Near the community, and indeed at its original location, flows the actual Roßbach. Oberroßbach belongs to the Verbandsgemeinde of Rennerod, a kind of collective municipality. Its seat is in the like-named town.

Greater towns in the area are Siegen and Koblenz. The community’s highest point is Löh, also known as Hiesel.

=== Geology ===
In the 20th century, basalt was quarried in Oberroßbach. Until about 1970, the roadway was cobbled.

=== Neighbouring communities ===
Oberroßbach borders on Fehl-Ritzhausen, Zehnhausen, Niederroßbach, Hof and Salzburg.

== Population ==
Almost all inhabitants follow the Protestant faith. There are, however, also atheists, Catholics and members of the New Apostolic Church.

In 1819 there were 70 children (24% of the population) in school in Oberroßbach. In 1900, it was only 45, and after World War II, 36. When the school was dissolved in 1970, however, there were 61 children.

=== Population development ===
Year	1643	1665	1741	1807	1819	1900	1945	2007	2008
	6	65	92	175	283	183	256	342	356

== History ==
In 1440, both places had their first documentary mention as Obern Rospach.

== Politics ==
=== Community council ===
The council is made up of 8 council members who were elected in a majority vote in a municipal election on 13 June 2004.

=== Coat of arms ===
The blue bend in the community’s arms stands for the Roßbach, and the hexagonal columns refer to basalt quarrying’s former importance.

== Culture and sightseeing ==
The continuation of Goethe’s tragic play Die natürliche Tochter was to have played in Oberroßbach, but this never came about.

=== Buildings ===
In Oberroßbach there are a village community house and a well out of which flows undrinkable water. There is the Ältsch Haus, and there are also a gliderport and a fire brigade equipment building.

=== Sport ===
In the village is a playing ground with a small sport ground. The associations offer their respective sports.

=== Regular events ===
Associations offer regular events.

== Associations ==
In Oberroßbach there are a few associations. Among them are the following:

- The Haareweißleu, a kind of tradition club that takes part in village festivals.
- The Oberroßbach Volunteer Fire Brigade, which likewise takes part in village festivals. Also belonging to it is the Oberroßbach Youth Volunteer Fire Brigade.

== Economy and infrastructure ==
=== Transport ===
The local bus lines 463 and 484 connect the village to the public local transport, it is located in the area of the transport association Verkehrsverbund Rhein-Mosel (VRM), fare zone number 445. East of the community runs Bundesstraße 54, leading from Limburg an der Lahn to Siegen. The nearest Autobahn interchange is Haiger/Burbach on the A 45 (Dortmund–Aschaffenburg), some 15 km away. The nearest InterCityExpress stop is the train station at Montabaur on the Cologne–Frankfurt high-speed rail line.

=== Established businesses ===
There is in Oberroßbach Spedition Sahm, a rather large shipping business. There is also the Töpferei Höller, a ceramics works. As well, there is the Sahm galvanizing plant.
