= Niederroßbach =

- Municipality
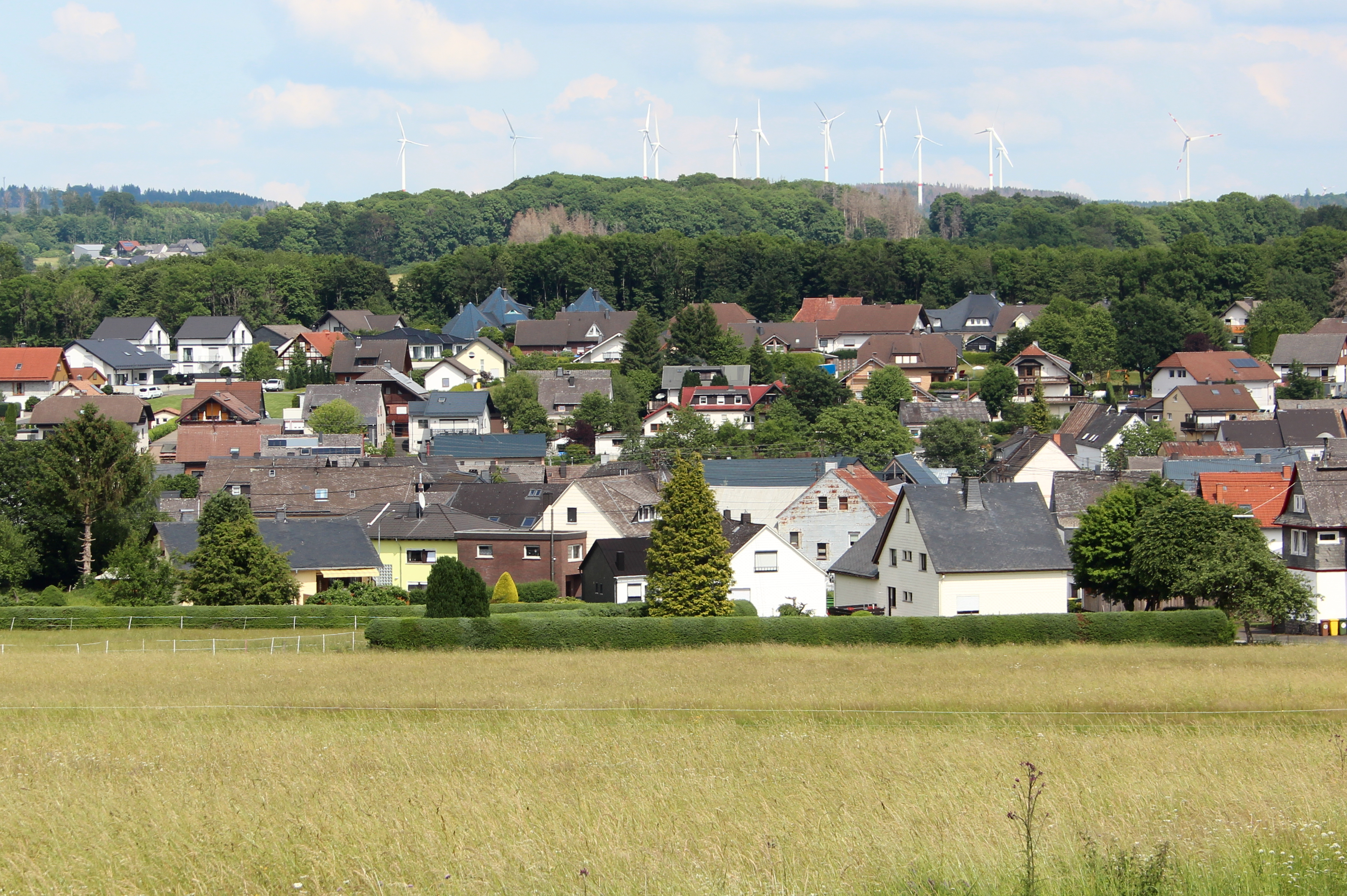

- Coat of arms

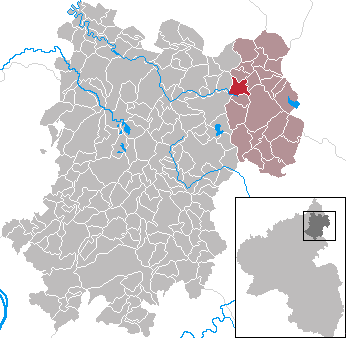
- Location of Niederroßbach within Westerwaldkreis district
- Interactive map of Niederroßbach
- Location within Germany Location within Rhineland-Palatinate
- Coordinates: 50°38′30″N 8°2′4″E
- Country: Germany
- State: Rhineland-Palatinate
- District: Westerwaldkreis
- Municipal assoc.: Rennerod

Government
  - Mayor (2019–24): Bernd Schäfer

Area
  - Total: 4.39 km^{2} (1.69 sq mi)
- Elevation: 495 m (1,624 ft)

Population (2025-12-31)
  - Total: 731
  - Density: 167/km^{2} (431/sq mi)
- Time zone: UTC+01:00 (CET)
  - Summer (DST): UTC+02:00 (CEST)
- Postal codes: 56479
- Dialling codes: 02664
- Vehicle registration: WW
- Website: www.rennerod.de

Niederroßbach is an Ortsgemeinde – a community belonging to a Verbandsgemeinde – in the Westerwaldkreis in Rhineland-Palatinate, Germany.

== Geography ==
=== Location ===
The community lies in the Westerwald between Siegen and Limburg an der Lahn. Through the community flow the Ortsbach and the Roßbach. Niederroßbach belongs to the Verbandsgemeinde of Rennerod, a kind of collective municipality. Its seat is in the like-named town.

=== Neighbouring communities ===
Niederroßbach's neighbours are Oberroßbach, Fehl-Ritzhausen, Neustadt and Zehnhausen bei Rennerod.

== History ==
In 1431, Niederroßbach had its first documentary mention.

== Politics ==
The council is made up of 13 council members, including the extraofficial mayor (Bürgermeister).

	FW	FW	Total
2004	7	5	12 seats

== Economy and infrastructure ==
The local bus lines 483 (Bad Marienberg - Rennerod) and 484 (Rennerod - Westerburg) connect the village to the public transport, the village is located in the transport association Verkehrsverbund Rhein-Mosel (VRM), zone number 445.

Running right near the community are Bundesstraßen 54, linking Limburg an der Lahn with Siegen, and 255, leading from Montabaur to Herborn. The nearest Autobahn interchange is Haiger/Burbach on the A 45 (Dortmund–Hanau), some 17 km away.

Niederroßbach also in the past had a stop at the Cross Westerwald Railway (Montabaur - Wallmerod - Westerburg - Rennerod - Herborn) which is out of service for passenger trains, but still drsisine rides take place between Rennerod and Fehl-Ritzhausen organized by the interest group IG Westerwald Querbahn e. V.

Today the nearest accessibility to train service is Westerburg station at the Limburg-Altenkirchen railway (RB90). The nearest InterCityExpress stop is the railway station at Montabaur on the Cologne-Frankfurt high-speed rail line.
