= Neunkirchen, Westerwaldkreis =

Neunkirchen
- Municipality
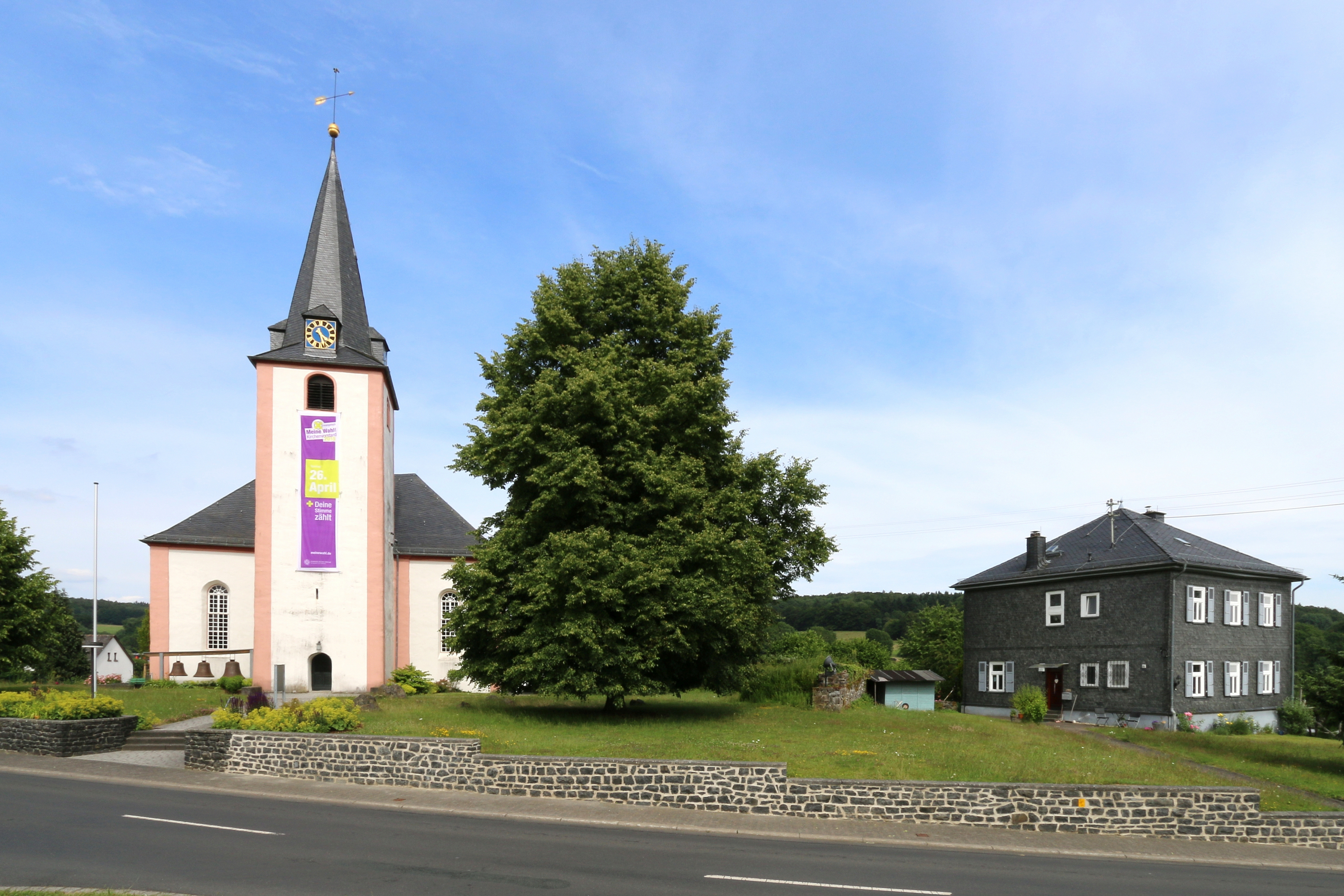

- Coat of arms

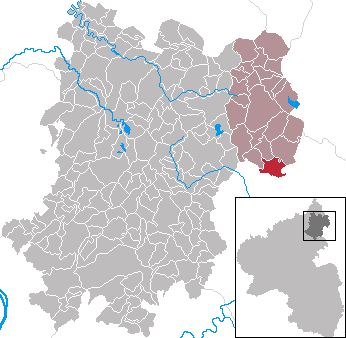
- Location of Neunkirchen within Westerwaldkreis district
- Interactive map of Neunkirchen
- Location within Germany Location within Rhineland-Palatinate
- Coordinates: 50°32′49″N 8°6′14″E
- Country: Germany
- State: Rhineland-Palatinate
- District: Westerwaldkreis
- Municipal assoc.: Rennerod

Government
  - Mayor (2019–24): Hartmut Schwarz

Area
  - Total: 6.61 km^{2} (2.55 sq mi)
- Elevation: 320 m (1,050 ft)

Population (2025-12-31)
  - Total: 554
  - Density: 83.8/km^{2} (217/sq mi)
- Time zone: UTC+01:00 (CET)
  - Summer (DST): UTC+02:00 (CEST)
- Postal codes: 56479
- Dialling codes: 06436
- Vehicle registration: WW
- Website: www.rennerod.de

Neunkirchen (German: [ˈnɔʏnkɪʁçn̩]) is an Ortsgemeinde – a community belonging to a Verbandsgemeinde – in the Westerwaldkreis in Rhineland-Palatinate, Germany.

== Economy and infrastructure ==
The village is served by the local busses of the line 957 and located in the area of the transport association Verkehrsverbund Rhein-Mosel (VRM), zone number 442.

== Geography ==
The community lies in the Westerwald between the towns of Siegen (38 km to the north), Wetzlar (28 km to the east) and Limburg an der Lahn (19 km to the south). Neunkirchen is the southernmost place belonging to the Verbandsgemeinde of Rennerod – a kind of collective municipality – whose seat is in the like-named town.
