= Waigandshain =

- Municipality
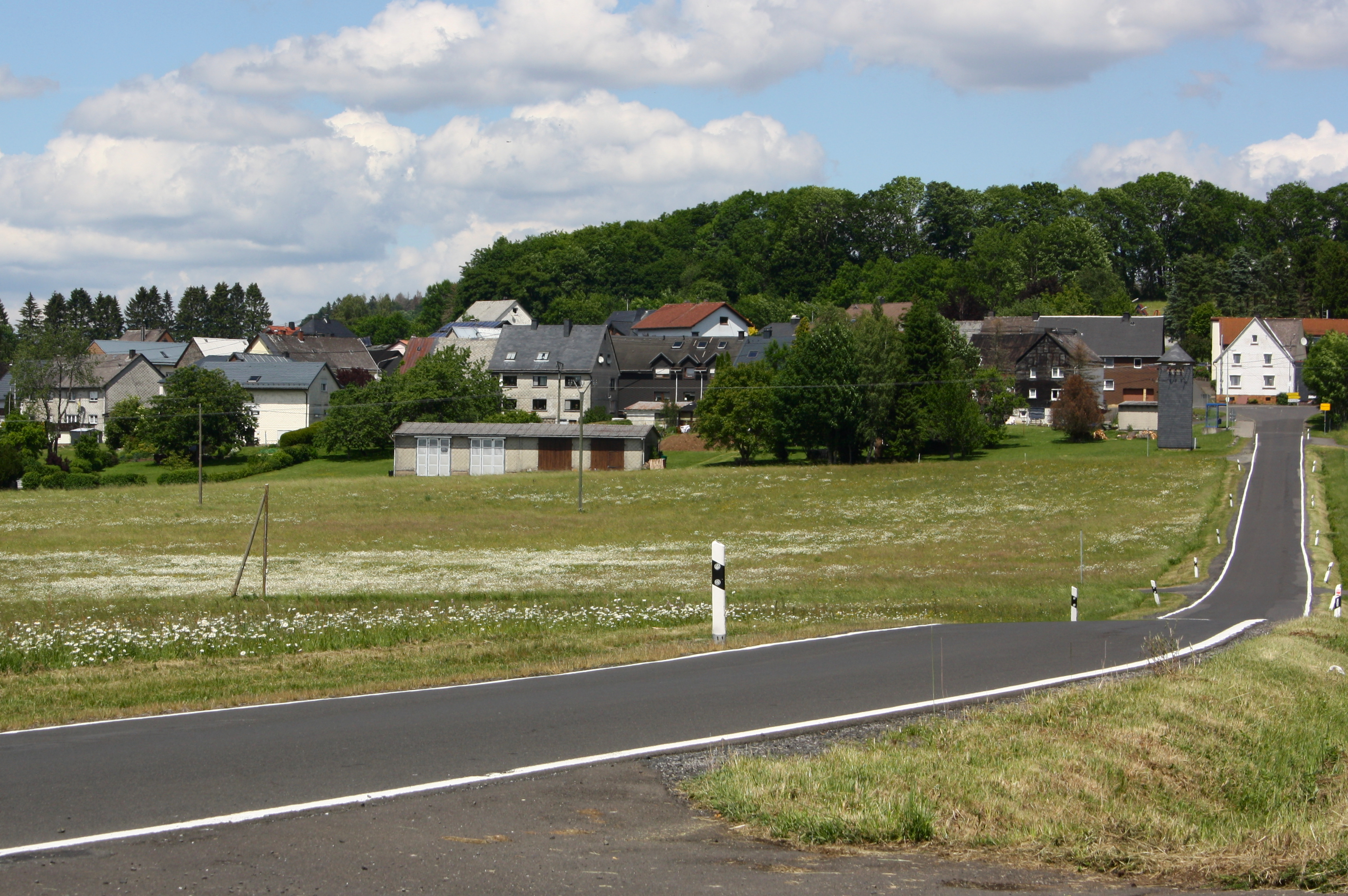

- Coat of arms

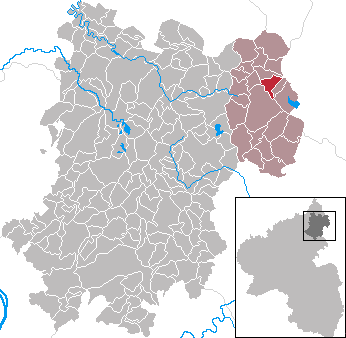
- Location of Waigandshain within Westerwaldkreis district
- Interactive map of Waigandshain
- Location within Germany Location within Rhineland-Palatinate
- Coordinates: 50°38′41″N 8°5′7″E
- Country: Germany
- State: Rhineland-Palatinate
- District: Westerwaldkreis
- Municipal assoc.: Rennerod

Government
  - Mayor (2019–24): Jürgen Höppner

Area
  - Total: 4.05 km^{2} (1.56 sq mi)
- Elevation: 530 m (1,740 ft)

Population (2025-12-31)
  - Total: 199
  - Density: 49.1/km^{2} (127/sq mi)
- Time zone: UTC+01:00 (CET)
  - Summer (DST): UTC+02:00 (CEST)
- Postal codes: 56477
- Dialling codes: 02664
- Vehicle registration: WW
- Website: www.rennerod.de

Waigandshain is an Ortsgemeinde – a community belonging to a Verbandsgemeinde – in the Westerwaldkreis in Rhineland-Palatinate, Germany.

== Geography ==
The community lies in the Westerwald between Siegen and Limburg. The Breitbach Reservoir lies within the municipal area. Waigandshain belongs to the Verbandsgemeinde of Rennerod, a kind of collective municipality. Its seat is in the like-named town.

== History ==
In 1346, Waigandshain had its first documentary mention as Wiganshen.

== Politics ==
The municipal council is made up of 6 council members who were elected in a majority vote in a municipal election on 13 June 2004.

== Economy and infrastructure ==
The local bus lines 477, 480 and 972 connect Waigandahain to the public transport, the village is located in the fare zone number 444 of the transport association Verkehrsverbund Rhein-Mosel (VRM). Near the community, Bundesstraßen 54 linking Limburg an der Lahn with Siegen, and 414 leading from Hohenroth to Hachenburg cross each other. The nearest Autobahn interchange is Haiger/Burbach on the A 45 (Dortmund–Aschaffenburg), some 16 km away. The nearest Intercity Express stop is the railway station at Montabaur on the Cologne-Frankfurt high-speed rail line.

The Wind park Waigandshain-Homberg produces sustainable electricity through twelve wind turbines.
