= Rehe, Germany =

Rehe
- Municipality
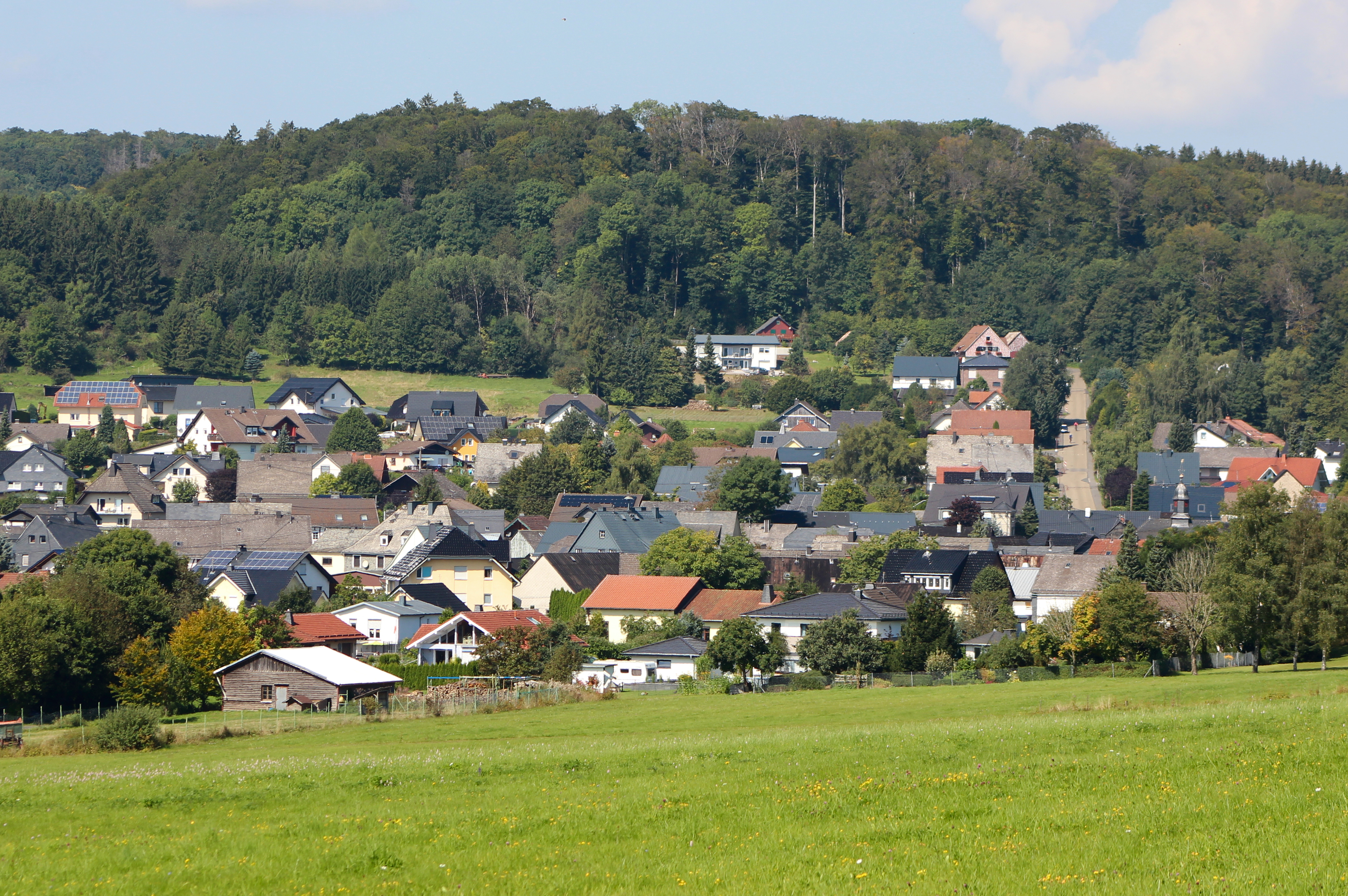

- Coat of arms

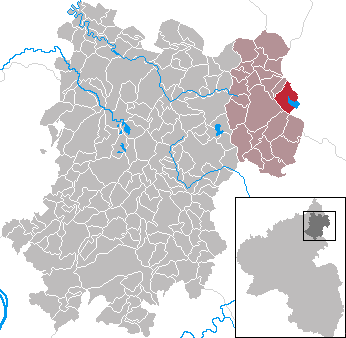
- Location of Rehe within Westerwaldkreis district
- Interactive map of Rehe
- Location within Germany Location within Rhineland-Palatinate
- Coordinates: 50°38′7″N 8°7′9″E
- Country: Germany
- State: Rhineland-Palatinate
- District: Westerwaldkreis
- Municipal assoc.: Rennerod

Government
  - Mayor (2019–24): Johannes Beul

Area
  - Total: 7.41 km^{2} (2.86 sq mi)
- Elevation: 535 m (1,755 ft)

Population (2025-12-31)
  - Total: 927
  - Density: 125/km^{2} (324/sq mi)
- Time zone: UTC+01:00 (CET)
  - Summer (DST): UTC+02:00 (CEST)
- Postal codes: 56479
- Dialling codes: 02664
- Vehicle registration: WW
- Website: www.rennerod.de

Rehe is an Ortsgemeinde – a community belonging to a Verbandsgemeinde – in the Westerwaldkreis in Rhineland-Palatinate, Germany.

== Geography ==
The community lies in the Westerwald between Siegen and Limburg. Within the municipal area is found the Krombach Reservoir, which is also split by the border to the county of Lahn-Dill Kreis of Hesse. Rehe belongs to the Verbandsgemeinde of Rennerod, a kind of collective municipality. Its seat is in the like-named town. Right at the outer North-East of the Village crosses the border of the German federal state of Hesse.

== History ==
About 1300, Rehe had its first documentary mention. The heritage of the name Rehe is relatively unknown, but it's being said that the first family to settle down in the area had the name Reeh. Another possible explanation is, that the name references to the big population of deer (in German Reh(e)) around the area. Yet another explanation lays in the name of the little river flowing across the area, called Rehbach

== Politics ==
The municipal council is made up of 12 council members who were elected in a majority vote in a municipal election on 13 June 2004.

== Economy and infrastructure ==
=== Transport ===
The village is connected to the local bus lines 477, 480, 520 and 521 and located in the area of the transport association Verkehrsverbund Rhein-Mosel (VRM), zone number 458.

In the past, Rehe also was connected to the Cross Westerwald Railway (Montabaur - Wallmerod - Westerburg - Rennerod - Herborn). This line nowadays is only in service for fright train service between Montabaur and Wallmerod and for railbike rides from Fehl-Ritzhausen to Rennerod, organized by the interest group IG Westerwald-Querbahn e. V. (IWQ). Nowadays the nearest accessabilities to the railway service are Willmenrod stop and Westerburg station.

Running right through the community is Bundesstraße 255, leading from Montabaur to Herborn. The nearest Autobahn interchange is Herborn on the A 45 (Dortmund–Hanau), some 14 km away.

The nearest InterCityExpress stop is the railway station at Montabaur on the Cologne-Frankfurt high-speed rail line.

=== Tourism ===
Despite its size, Rehe has quite a few touristic attractions. On the one hand, there is the so-called Café Windlück, a farmer's building built in the traditional way of the Westerwald as a timbered house with way down-reaching roof on the weather side, which was built in the late Middle Ages around the year 1600. It now houses a small cafè decorated in the rural style of Westerwald.

The town hall of Rehe also is an old traditional former school-building of the 1700s which is also built as timbered house but with ornate carvings around the outer walls.

At the northwest corner of the village lays the Christliches Erholungsheim Westerwald ("Christian retreat house in Westerwald") which is a Christian embossed guesthouse in the secluded forest which offers many family vacations and youth camps.
