= Seck =

- Municipality
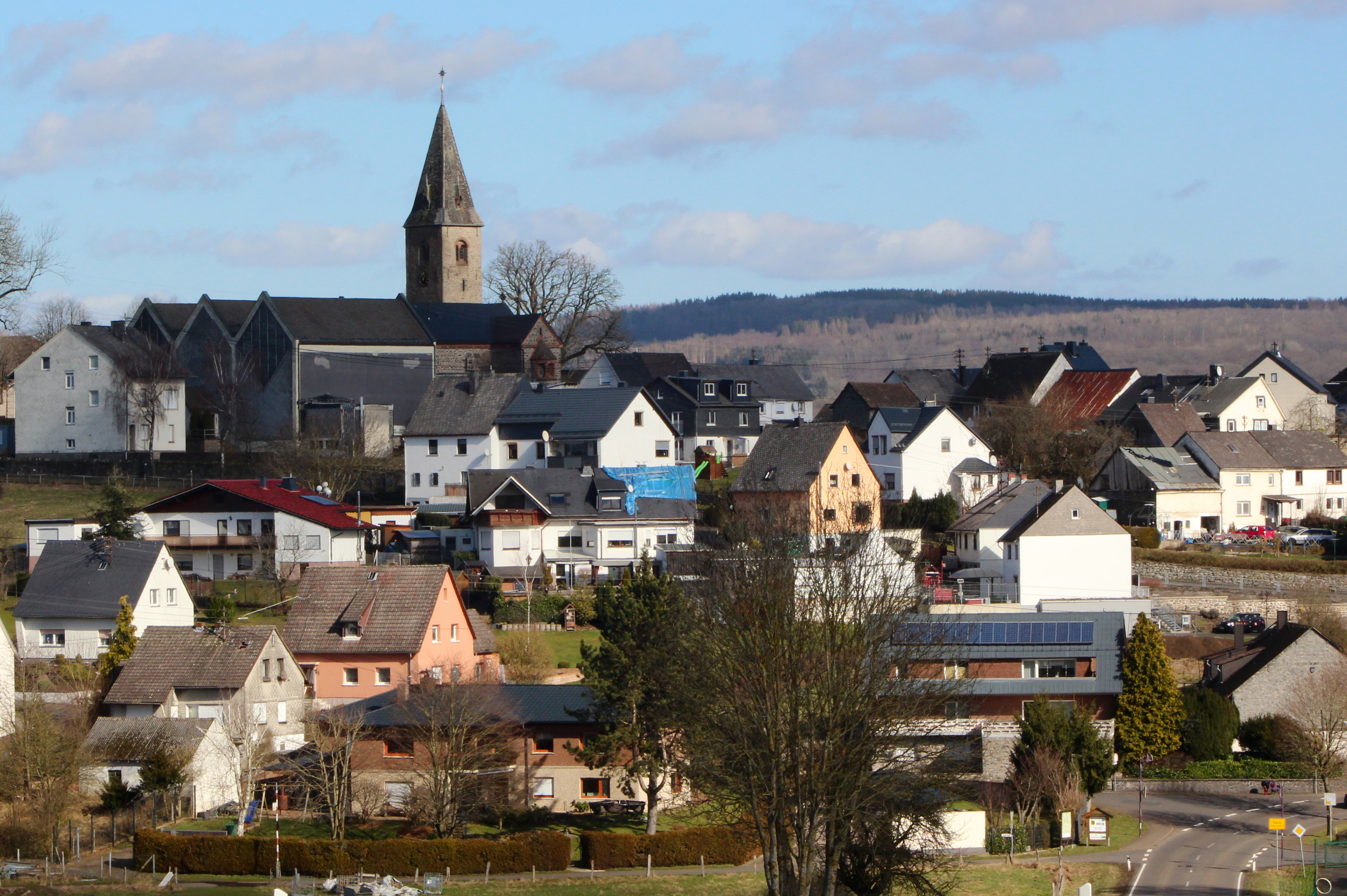

- Coat of arms

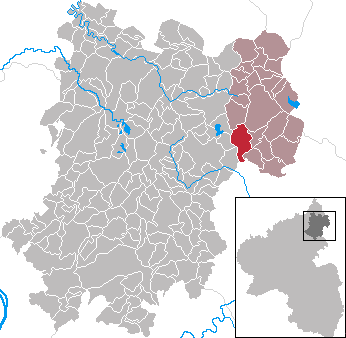
- Location of Seck within Westerwaldkreis district
- Interactive map of Seck
- Location within Germany Location within Rhineland-Palatinate
- Coordinates: 50°34′38″N 8°2′59″E
- Country: Germany
- State: Rhineland-Palatinate
- District: Westerwaldkreis
- Municipal assoc.: Rennerod

Government
  - Mayor (2019–24): Johannes Jung

Area
  - Total: 8.61 km^{2} (3.32 sq mi)
- Elevation: 415 m (1,362 ft)

Population (2025-12-31)
  - Total: 1,170
  - Density: 136/km^{2} (352/sq mi)
- Time zone: UTC+01:00 (CET)
  - Summer (DST): UTC+02:00 (CEST)
- Postal codes: 56479
- Dialling codes: 02664
- Vehicle registration: WW
- Website: www.rennerod.de

Seck (German pronunciation: [zɛk]) is an Ortsgemeinde – a municipality belonging to a Verbandsgemeinde – in the Westerwaldkreis in Rhineland-Palatinate, Germany.

== Geography ==
The municipality in the Westerwald between Siegen and Limburg an der Lahn. Seck belongs to the Verbandsgemeinde of Rennerod, a kind of collective municipality. Its seat is in the like-named town.

== History ==
Count Gebhard of the Niederlahngau (832–879) was the first known lord of that holding around Seck in the Middle Westerwald, from which he split the western part to endow his monastery at Gemünden. Count Gebhard's grandson, Rudolf I, Bishop of Würzburg (892–908) consecrated a church at Seck to Saint Kilian. Seck had its first documentary mention on 27 May 1059 by King Heinrich IV. In the time that followed, Seck acquired a court. Its great parish reached through Rennerod and Lasterbach all the way to Oberrod. Arnold I of Vaucourt, Archbishop of Trier documented in 1181 that the Seligenstatt Monastery in Seck had been donated to the Archmonastery of Trier (Erzstift Trier). In 1215 it was the Maria Laach Abbey's daughter monastery. In the mid 15th century, an end was put to monastery life. In 1468, excise from the Seck yearly market was raised. The Lords of Westerburg and Runkel held sway over the parish of Seck. Often, it was the object of disputes between these two houses and their sidelines. Prince Moritz Heinrich of Nassau-Hadamar had the Secker Weiher (pond) built in 1672, and shortly thereafter also the Schlösschen (little residential castle) at Seck, still known locally as the Alte Burg (“Old Castle”). Along with the Principality of Nassau-Hadamar, Seck passed to the Grand Duchy of Berg in 1806 and later to the Duchy of Nassau. Administratively, Seck went to the Amt of Rennerod. In 1866, Duke Adolf of Nassau lost his land to Prussia. The administrative offices were dissolved, “Stein” self-administration introduced, and Landkreise (rural districts) formed. Seck ended up in the Oberwesterwaldkreis, whose seat was in Marienberg, and then in 1855 in the newly formed Kreis Westerburg, which itself was merged in 1932 into a new Oberwesterwaldkreis with its seat in Westerburg. In 1974, Seck became part of the Verbandsgemeinde of Rennerod, but as an autonomous Ortsgemeinde. The two Westerwald districts (Oberwesterwaldkreis and Unterwesterwaldkreis) were dissolved and merged into the Westerwaldkreis with its seat in Montabaur.

== Politics ==
The council is made up of 16 council members who were elected in a municipal election on 13 June 2004. They all belong to a Wählergemeinschaft (“voters’ municipality”)

== Regular events ==
- In July, the church consecration festival, the Secker Kirmes (kermis) with its market, is held.
- Also popular is the Secker Oktoberfest held every year.
- Each summer in August on the campground at Seck (Camping Park Weiherhof), the Weiherfest (“Pond Festival”) is held at the Secker-Weiher (pond), where both campers and people from the area gather as the summer winds down.

== Economy and infrastructure ==
The local bus line 477 runs from Rehe via Rennerod, Seck and Westerburg to Montabaur. Seck is located in the area of the transport association Verkehrsverbund Rhein-Mosel (VRM), zone number 441. The nearest access to the train service is at Westerburg station. Right near the municipality runs Bundesstraße 54, leading from Limburg an der Lahn to Siegen. The nearest Autobahn interchange is Limburg-Nord on the A 3 (Cologne–Frankfurt), some 20 km away. Seck is located on Westerwaldsteig, a long distance walking- and cycling path from Herborn via Rennerod, Westerburg, Bad Marienberg and Hachenburg to Bad Hönningen. The nearest InterCityExpress stop is the railway station at Montabaur on the Cologne-Frankfurt high-speed rail line.
