= Elsoff =

- Municipality
- Coat of arms

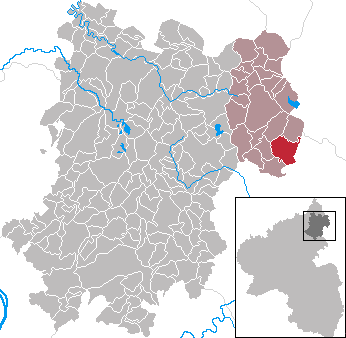
- Location of Elsoff within Westerwaldkreis district
- Interactive map of Elsoff
- Location within Germany Location within Rhineland-Palatinate
- Coordinates: 50°34′33″N 8°06′58″E
- Country: Germany
- State: Rhineland-Palatinate
- District: Westerwaldkreis
- Municipal assoc.: Rennerod

Government
  - Mayor (2019–24): Kornelia Jex

Area
  - Total: 9.44 km^{2} (3.64 sq mi)
- Elevation: 370 m (1,210 ft)

Population (2025-12-31)
  - Total: 1,002
  - Density: 106/km^{2} (275/sq mi)
- Time zone: UTC+01:00 (CET)
  - Summer (DST): UTC+02:00 (CEST)
- Postal codes: 56479
- Dialling codes: 02664
- Vehicle registration: WW
- Website: www.elsoff.de

Elsoff is an Ortsgemeinde – a municipality belonging to a Verbandsgemeinde – in the Westerwaldkreis in Rhineland-Palatinate, Germany.

== Geography ==
The municipality lies in the Westerwald between Siegen (35 km to the north), Wetzlar (28 km to the east) and Limburg an der Lahn (22 km to the south). Elsoff belongs to the Verbandsgemeinde of Rennerod, a kind of collective municipality.

== Politics ==
The municipal council is made up of 6 council members who were elected in a majority vote in a municipal election on 7 June 2009.

The patriarch of the American Hiester family political dynasty Daniel Hiester emigrated from Elsoff in 1737.

== Culture and sightseeing ==
Elsoff has listed cultural sites. The listing is divided into Elsoff and Mittelhofen, as they were previously independent municipalities.

Elsoff (Westerwald)

- Catholic parish church St. Peter and Paul in Kirchstrasse 19. A late historism basalt quarry stone hall with three naves, occupied in 1911. The church has a medieval tower and a grave cross (probably built in 1684), on pillars from the year 1779. Additionally a war memorial was established during 1914/18.
- A wayside shrine probably built in the 19th century, southeast of the village, on the road to Mengerskirchen.
- A Stations of the Cross, established in 1898, between two gates with a high cross built in 1990. Graveside settlements from the 20th century are situated there too.

Elsoff (Westerwald) – Mittelhofen

- A catholic branch church with a simple hall construction from 1788.

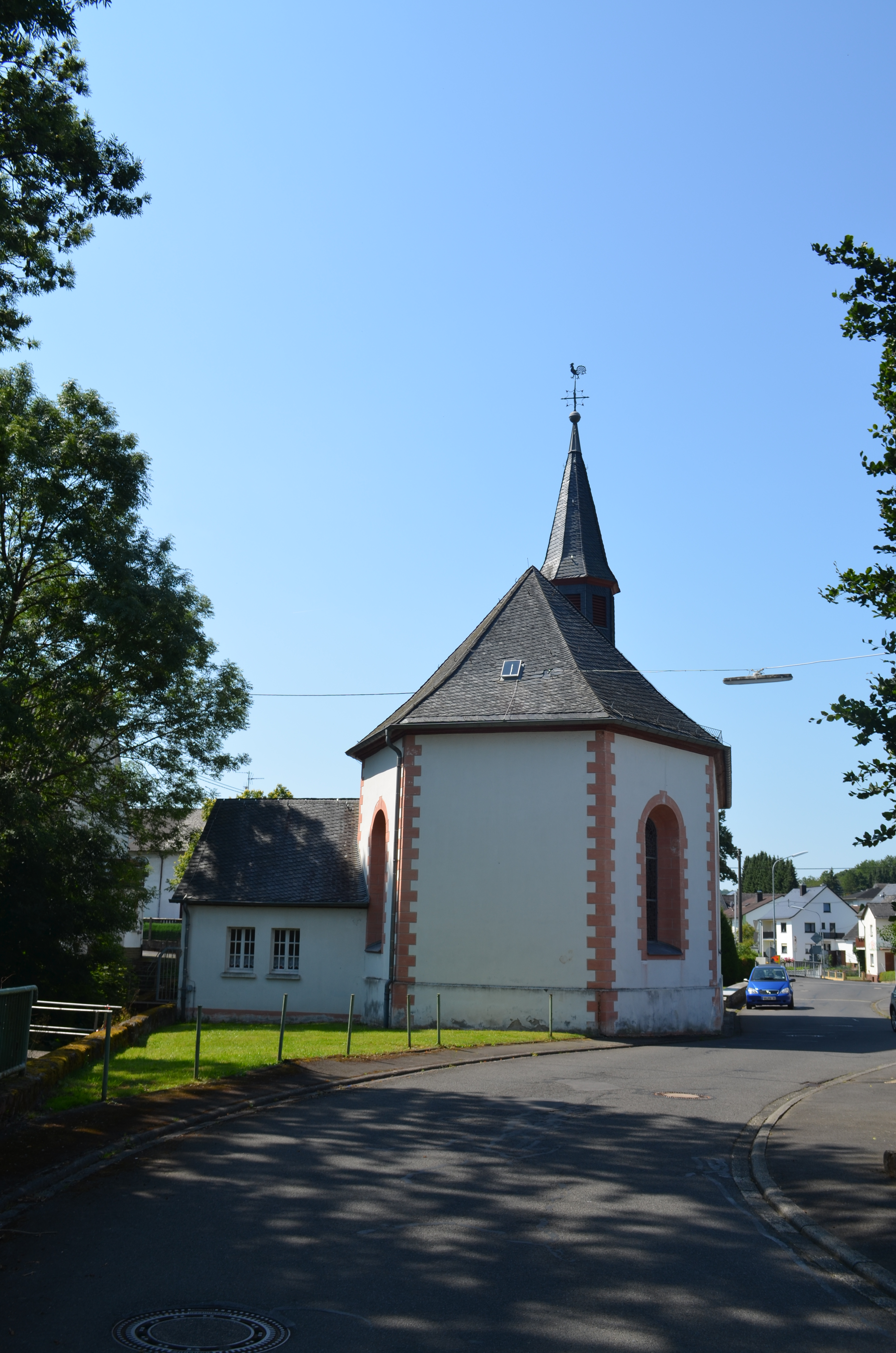
Catholic branch church

- A Half-timbered house, partly solid construction from the 18th century, still inhabited, with a cast iron fountain built in the 19th century at the Brunnenstrasse 11.

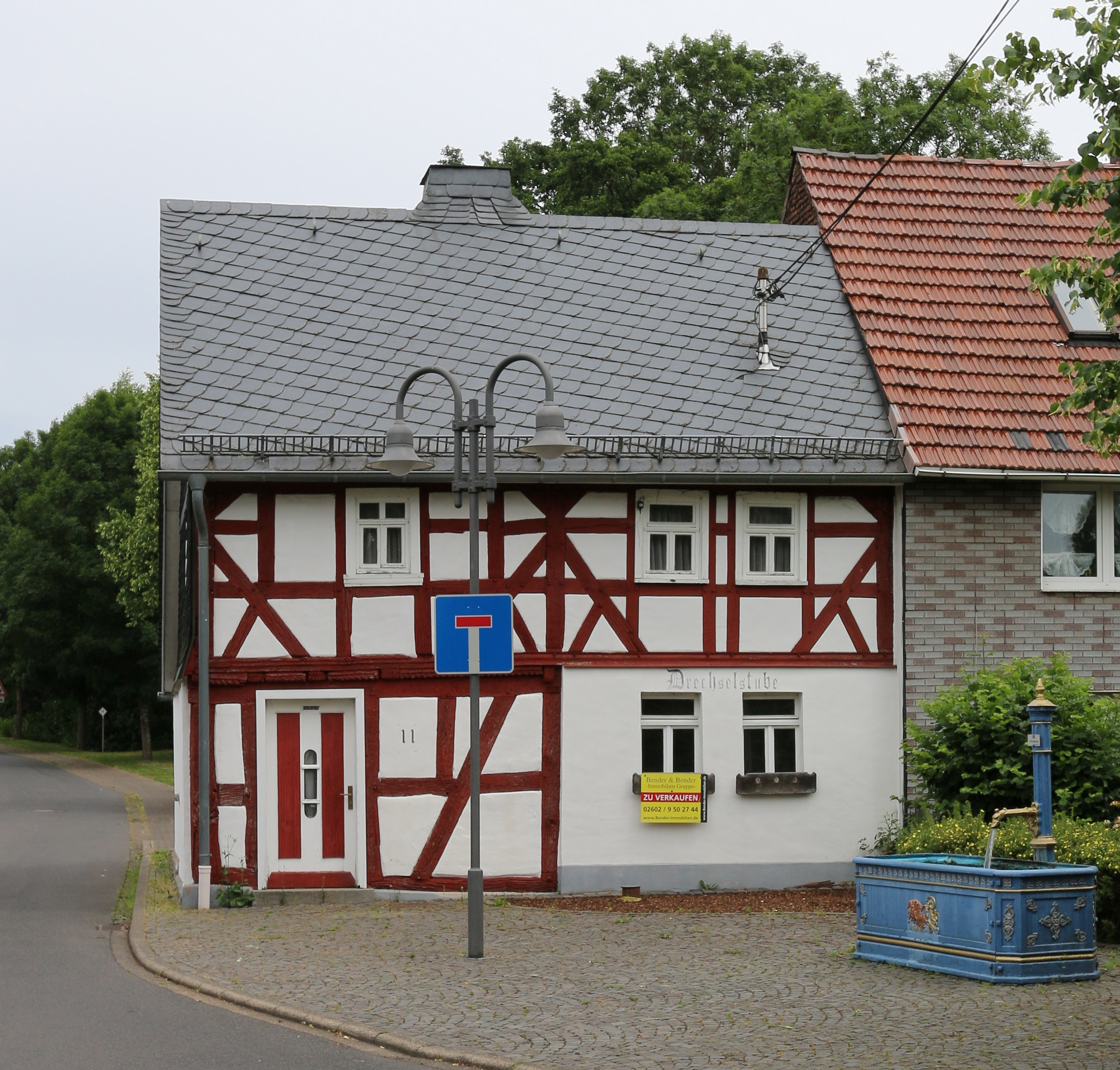
Half-timbered house and iron founatain

- Wayside shrine probably built in the 19th century north of the village, along a country lane.
- The Hof Krempel, a former manor with stately buildings around rectangular courtyard and partly half-timbered barn from the 18th century. The residential building and stable have a solid construction made in the 19th century.

== Economy and infrastructure ==
The local bus lines 477, 487 and 957 connect Elsoff to the public transport, Elsoff is located in the transport association Verkehrsverbund Rhein-Mosel (VRM), fare zone number 443. West of the municipality runs Bundesstraße 54, leading from Limburg an der Lahn to Siegen. The nearest Autobahn interchange is Herborn on the A 45 (Dortmund–Aschaffenburg), some 25 km away. The nearest InterCityExpress stop is the railway station at Montabaur on the Cologne-Frankfurt high-speed rail line.
