= Salzburg, Germany =

Salzburg
- Municipality
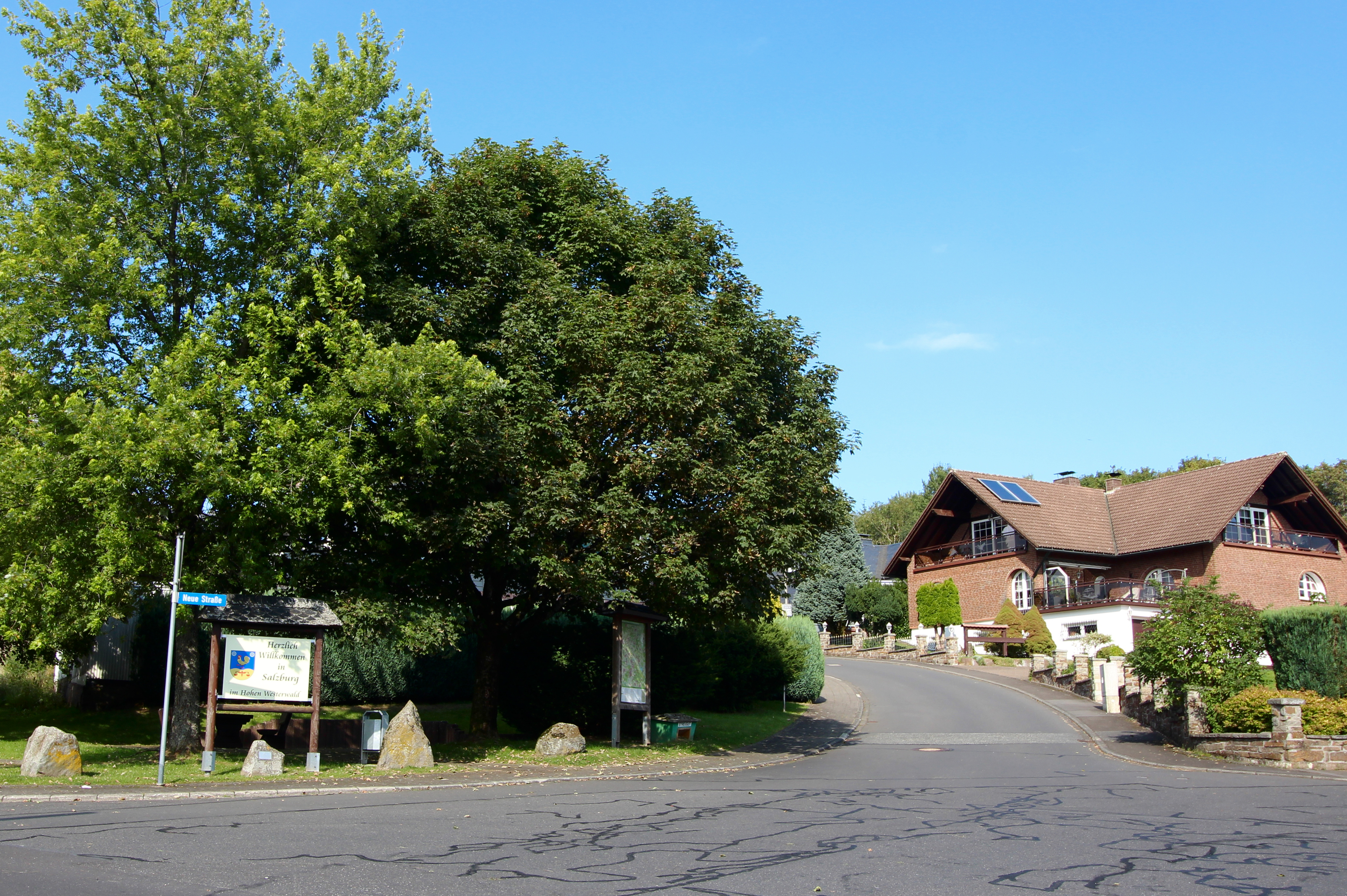

- Coat of arms

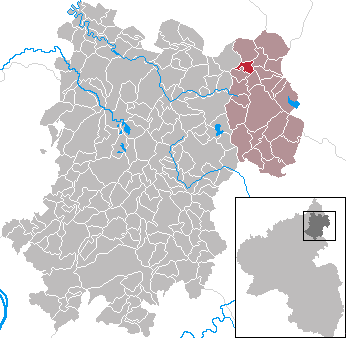
- Location of Salzburg within Westerwaldkreis district
- Interactive map of Salzburg
- Location within Germany Location within Rhineland-Palatinate
- Coordinates: 50°40′5″N 8°2′53″E
- Country: Germany
- State: Rhineland-Palatinate
- District: Westerwaldkreis
- Municipal assoc.: Rennerod

Government
  - Mayor (2019–24): Harald Menk

Area
  - Total: 2.3 km^{2} (0.89 sq mi)
- Elevation: 600 m (2,000 ft)

Population (2025-12-31)
  - Total: 233
  - Density: 100/km^{2} (260/sq mi)
- Time zone: UTC+01:00 (CET)
  - Summer (DST): UTC+02:00 (CEST)
- Postal codes: 56479
- Dialling codes: 02667
- Vehicle registration: WW
- Website: www.rennerod.de

Salzburg (German pronunciation: [ˈzaltsbʊʁk]) is an Ortsgemeinde – a community belonging to a Verbandsgemeinde – in the Westerwaldkreis in Rhineland-Palatinate, Germany.

== Geography ==
The community lies in the Westerwald between Siegen and Limburg. Salzburg belongs to the Verbandsgemeinde of Rennerod, a kind of collective municipality. Its seat is in the like-named town.

== History ==
About 1300, Salzburg had its first documentary mention as Salberg.

== Politics ==
The municipal council is made up of 6 council members.

== Economy and infrastructure ==
The local bus lines 463, 477 and 480 connect the village to the public transport, Salzburg is located in the area of the transport association Verkehrsverbund Rhein-Mosel (VRM), zone number 444. Right near the community, two Bundesstraßen, 54 linking Limburg an der Lahn with Siegen, and 414 leading from Hohenroth to Hachenburg cross each other. The nearest Autobahn interchange is Herborn on the A 45 (Dortmund–Hanau), some 20 km away. The nearest InterCityExpress stop is the railway station at Montabaur on the Cologne-Frankfurt high-speed rail line.

A wind farm is located in Salzburg.
