= Oberrod =

- Municipality
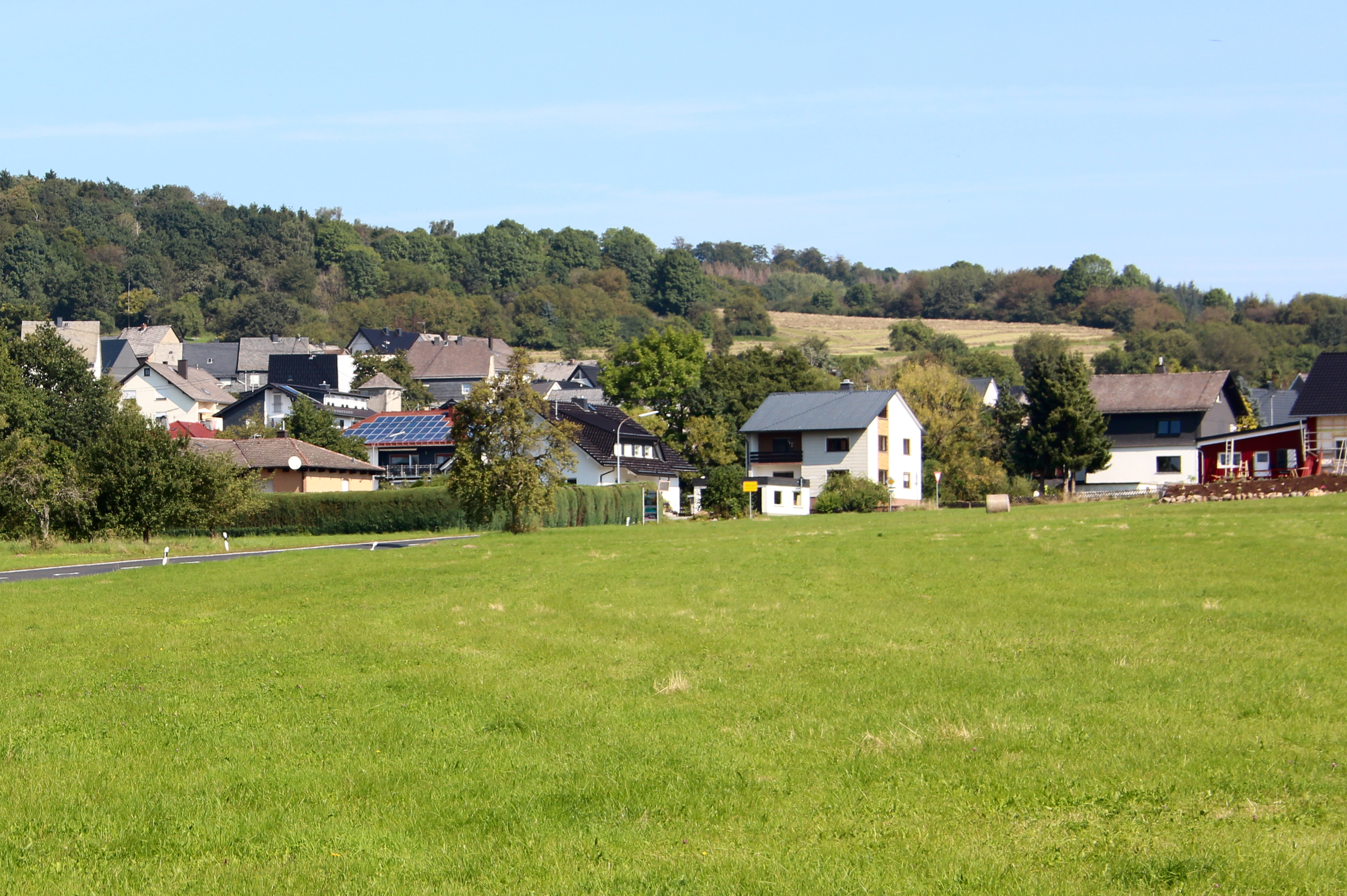

- Coat of arms

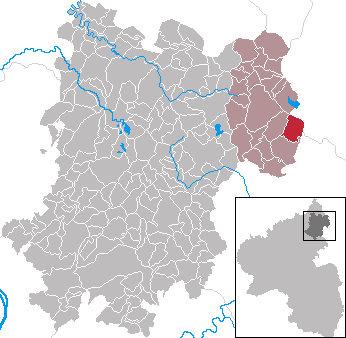
- Location of Oberrod within Westerwaldkreis district
- Interactive map of Oberrod
- Location within Germany Location within Rhineland-Palatinate
- Coordinates: 50°35′6″N 8°7′38″E
- Country: Germany
- State: Rhineland-Palatinate
- District: Westerwaldkreis
- Municipal assoc.: Rennerod

Government
  - Mayor (2019–24): Thomas Wüst

Area
  - Total: 6.72 km^{2} (2.59 sq mi)
- Elevation: 430 m (1,410 ft)

Population (2025-12-31)
  - Total: 636
  - Density: 94.6/km^{2} (245/sq mi)
- Time zone: UTC+01:00 (CET)
  - Summer (DST): UTC+02:00 (CEST)
- Postal codes: 56479
- Dialling codes: 02664
- Vehicle registration: WW
- Website: www.rennerod.de

Oberrod is an Ortsgemeinde – a community belonging to a Verbandsgemeinde – in the Westerwaldkreis in Rhineland-Palatinate, Germany.

== Geography ==
The community lies in the Westerwald on the boundary with Hesse. The nearest sizeable towns are Siegen (34 km to the north), Wetzlar (27 km to the east) and Limburg an der Lahn (24 km to the south). Through the community flows the Lasterbach. Oberrod belongs to the Verbandsgemeinde of Rennerod, a kind of collective municipality. Its seat is in the like-named town.

== Politics ==
The municipal council is made up of 12 council members who were elected in a majority vote in a municipal election on 13 June 2004.

== Regular events ==
One of the oldest clubs is the Schützenverein St. Hubertus 1910 Oberrod e.V. (shooting club). Each year at Whitsun the club stages a three-day shooting festival.

A further highlight is the so-called Backes- und Brunnenfest (“Bakehouse and Well Festival”), which takes place from 18 to 20 August at the village well. To eat there is, among other things, the so-called "Flappeskuchen", which is baked in the traditional way in a quaint woodburning oven.

== Economy and infrastructure ==
The local bus lines 477, 480, 487 and N48 connect Oberrod to the public transport, the village is located in the area of the transport association Verkehrsverbund Rhein-Mosel (VRM), zone number 443. East of the community runs Bundesstraße 54, leading from Limburg an der Lahn to Siegen. The nearest Autobahn interchange is Herborn on the A 45 (Dortmund–Hanau), some 23 km away. The nearest InterCityExpress stop is the railway station at Montabaur on the Cologne-Frankfurt high-speed rail line.
