= Waldmühlen =

- Municipality
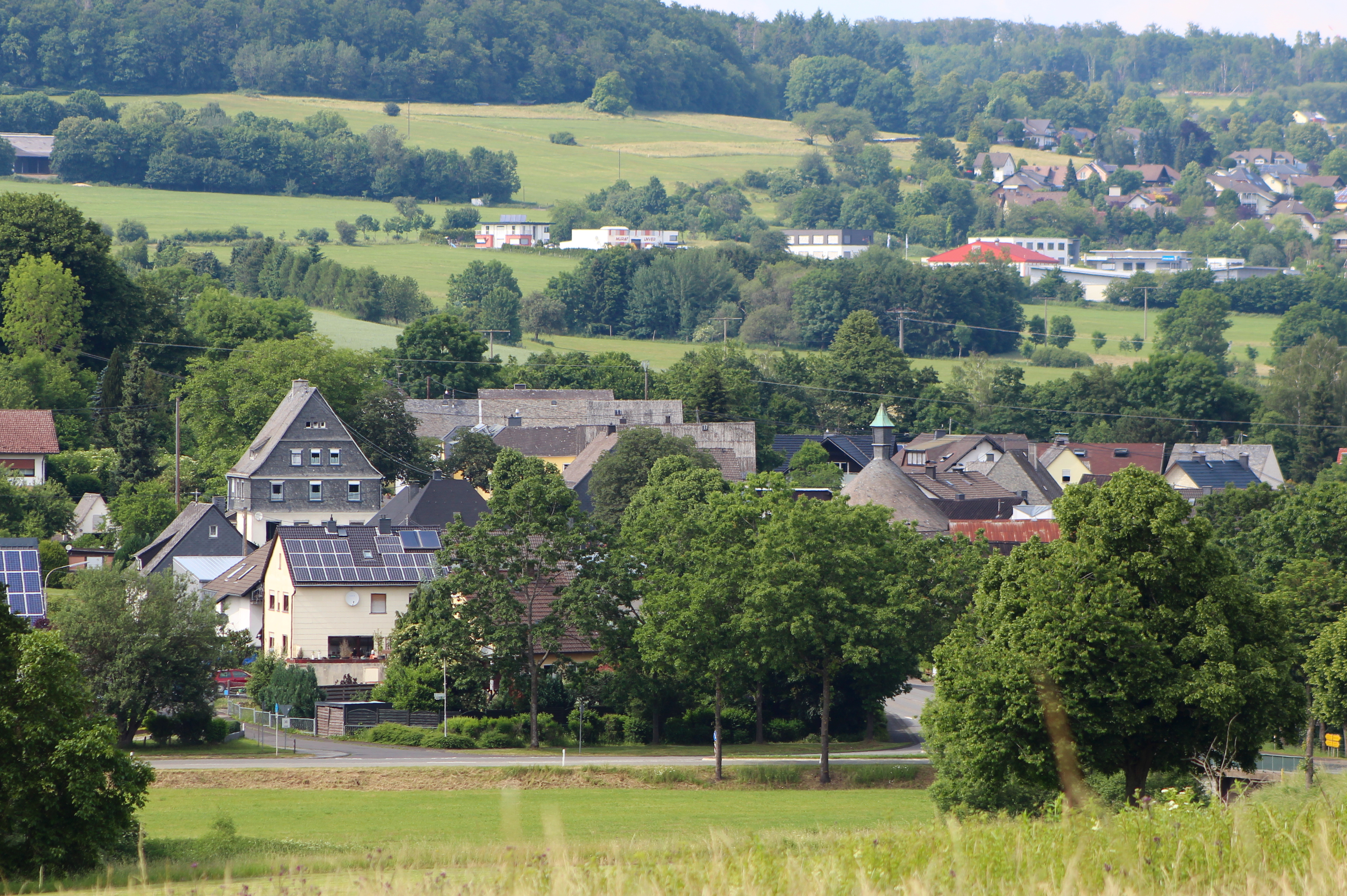

- Coat of arms

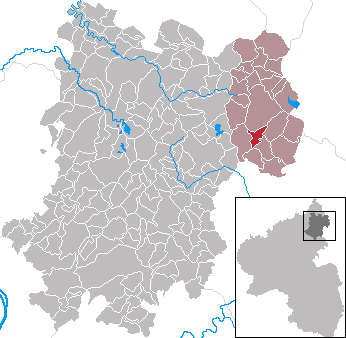
- Location of Waldmühlen within Westerwaldkreis district
- Interactive map of Waldmühlen
- Location within Germany Location within Rhineland-Palatinate
- Coordinates: 50°35′14″N 8°3′49″E
- Country: Germany
- State: Rhineland-Palatinate
- District: Westerwaldkreis
- Municipal assoc.: Rennerod

Government
  - Mayor (2019–24): Guntram Janz

Area
  - Total: 3.10 km^{2} (1.20 sq mi)
- Elevation: 405 m (1,329 ft)

Population (2025-12-31)
  - Total: 315
  - Density: 102/km^{2} (263/sq mi)
- Time zone: UTC+01:00 (CET)
  - Summer (DST): UTC+02:00 (CEST)
- Postal codes: 56479
- Dialling codes: 02664
- Vehicle registration: WW
- Website: Waldmühlen auf VG Rennerod Website

Waldmühlen is an Ortsgemeinde – a community belonging to a Verbandsgemeinde – in the Westerwaldkreis in Rhineland-Palatinate, Germany.

== Geography ==
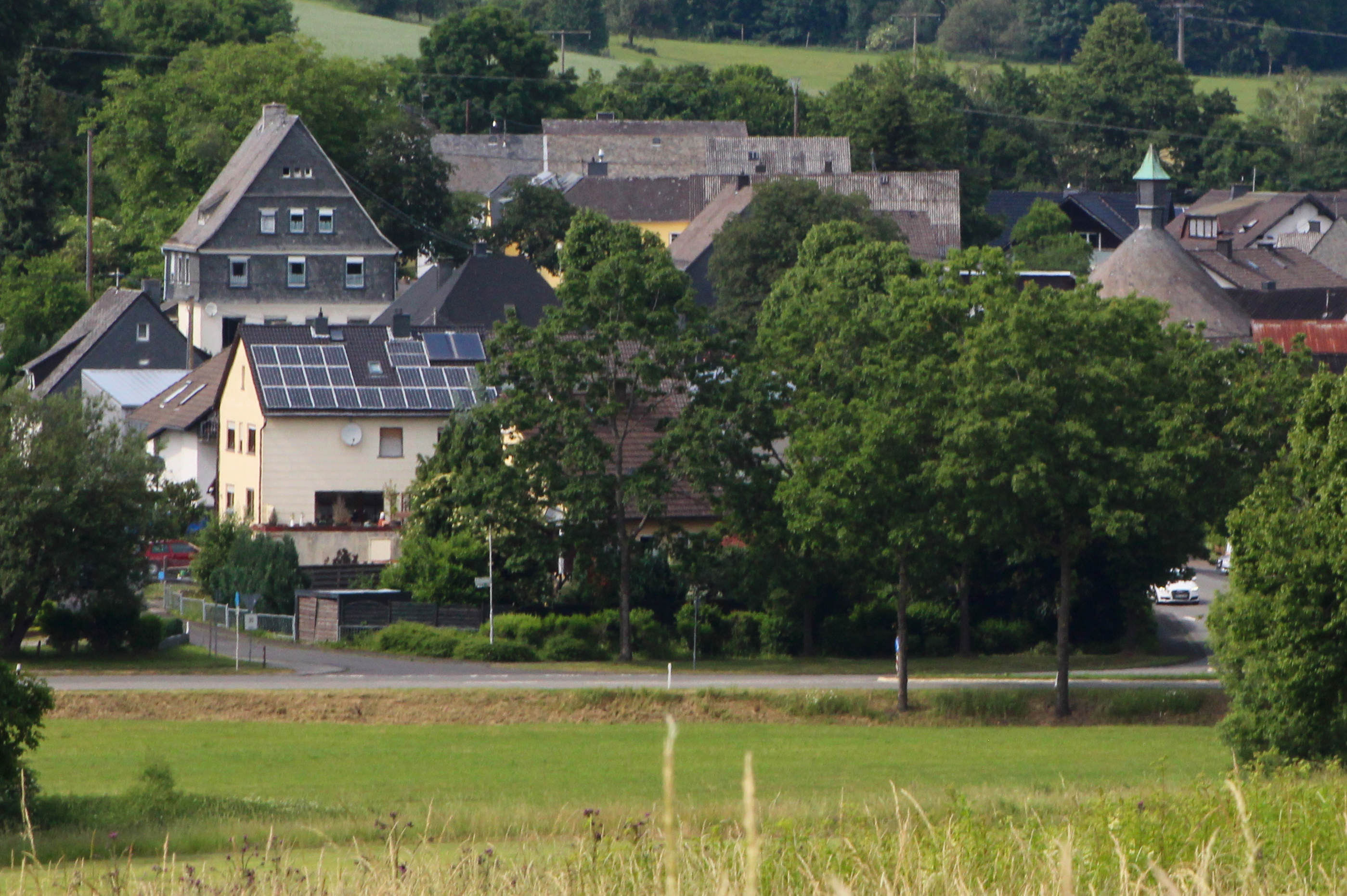
View on the village

The community lies in the Westerwald between Siegen und Limburg. Waldmühlen belongs to the Verbandsgemeinde of Rennerod, a kind of collective municipality. Its seat is in the like-named town. The Holzbach crosses Bundesstraße 54 at the community's edge.

== History ==
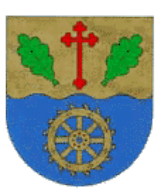
Coat of arms

In the 15th century, Waldmühlen had its first documentary mention as Walkmohle.

== Politics ==
The municipal council is made up of 8 council members who were elected in a majority vote in a municipal election on 26 March 2006.

== Economy and infrastructure ==
The village has access to the public transport through the local bus lines 477, 487, 957 and 971. It is located on the area of the transport association Verkehrsverbund Rhein-Mosel (VRM), zone number 444. Running right through the community is Bundesstraße 54, linking Limburg an der Lahn with Siegen. The nearest Autobahn interchanges are Herborn and Haiger-Burbach on the A 45 (Dortmund–Gießen), and also Montabaur and Limburg-Nord on the A 3 (Cologne–Frankfurt), all between 20 and 25 km away. Waldmühlen is located on Westerwaldsteig, a long distance walking- and cycling path from Herborn via Rennerod, Westerburg, Bad Marienberg and Hachenburg to Bad Hönningen. The nearest train stops are Westerburg station, Berzhahn and Willmenrod, nearest InterCityExpress stops are the railway stations at Montabaur and Limburg-Süd on the Cologne-Frankfurt high-speed rail line.
