= Bretthausen =

- Municipality
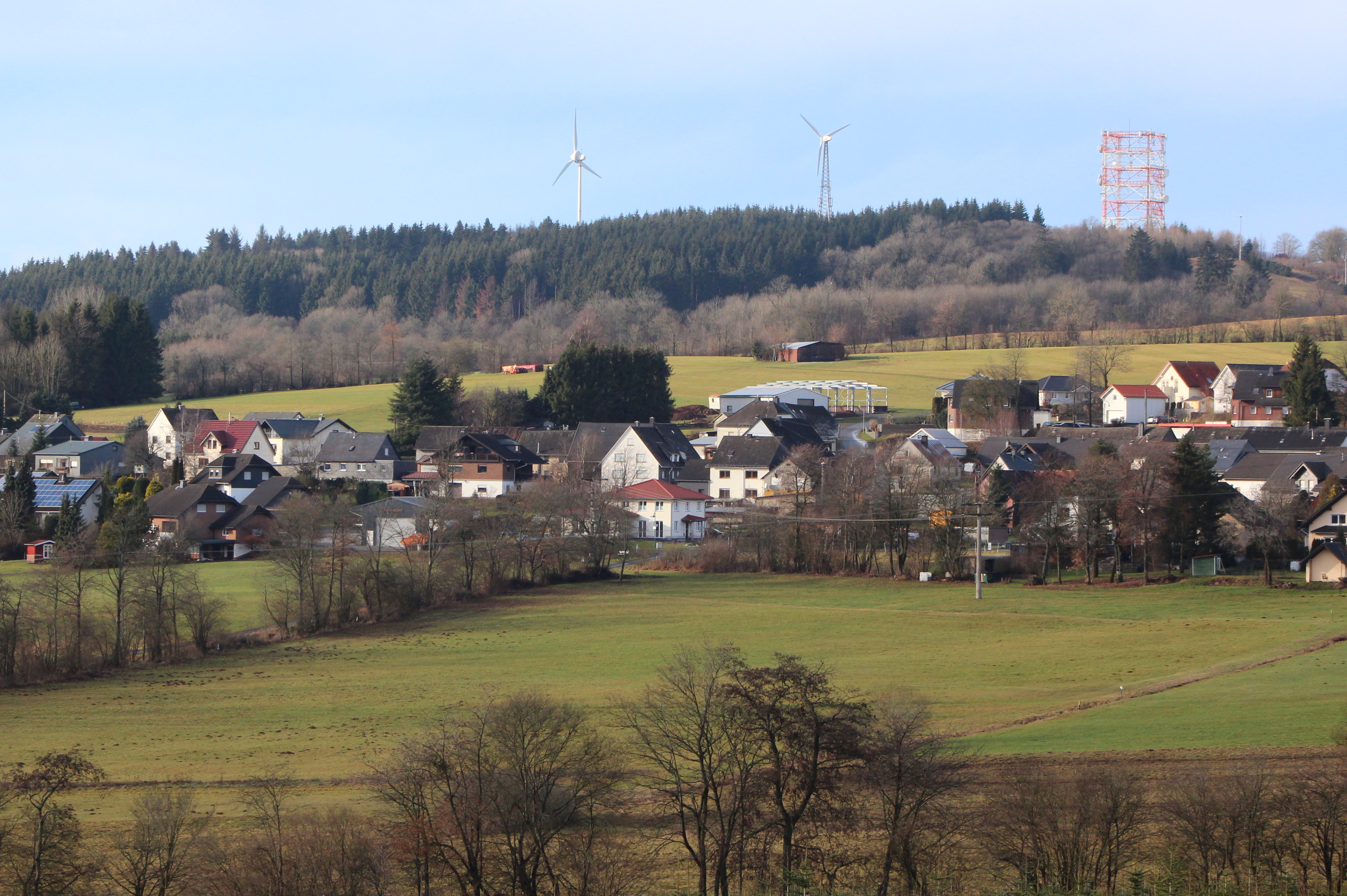

- Coat of arms

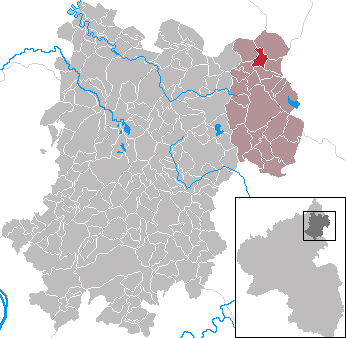
- Location of Bretthausen within Westerwaldkreis district
- Interactive map of Bretthausen
- Location within Germany Location within Rhineland-Palatinate
- Coordinates: 50°40′18″N 8°04′34″E
- Country: Germany
- State: Rhineland-Palatinate
- District: Westerwaldkreis
- Municipal assoc.: Rennerod

Government
  - Mayor (2019–24): Julia Bockius

Area
  - Total: 3.39 km^{2} (1.31 sq mi)
- Elevation: 575 m (1,886 ft)

Population (2025-12-31)
  - Total: 214
  - Density: 63.1/km^{2} (163/sq mi)
- Time zone: UTC+01:00 (CET)
  - Summer (DST): UTC+02:00 (CEST)
- Postal codes: 56479
- Dialling codes: 02667
- Vehicle registration: WW

Bretthausen is an Ortsgemeinde – a municipality belonging to a Verbandsgemeinde – in the Westerwaldkreis in Rhineland-Palatinate, Germany.

== Geography ==
The municipality lies in the Westerwald between Siegen and Limburg an der Lahn. Bretthausen belongs to the Verbandsgemeinde of Rennerod, a kind of collective municipality.

== History ==
About 1300, Bretthausen had its first documentary mention.

== Politics ==
=== municipality council ===
The council is made up of 6 council members who were elected in a majority vote in a municipal election on 7 June 2009.

=== Coat of arms ===
The municipality's arms are in the tinctures blue, red, gold and silver, which refer to the municipality's territorial allegiances over the ages. The three golden ears of grain symbolize agriculture's importance. The two flax blossoms refer to the linen industry. The wavy fess stands for the river Große Nister. The belltower stands for the school built in the municipality in 1910.

== Economy and infrastructure ==
The local bus lines 477 connects Bretthausen to the public transport, the village is located in the area of the transport association Verkehrsverbund Rhein-Mosel (VRM), fare zone number 459. Right near the municipality, Bundesstraßen 54, linking Limburg an der Lahn and Siegen, and 414 from Hohenroth to Hachenburg, cross each other. The nearest Autobahn interchange is Herborn on the A 45 (Dortmund–Aschaffenburg), some 20 km away. The nearest InterCityExpress stop is the railway station at Montabaur on the Cologne-Frankfurt high-speed rail line.
