= Homberg, Westerwaldkreis =

Homberg
- Municipality
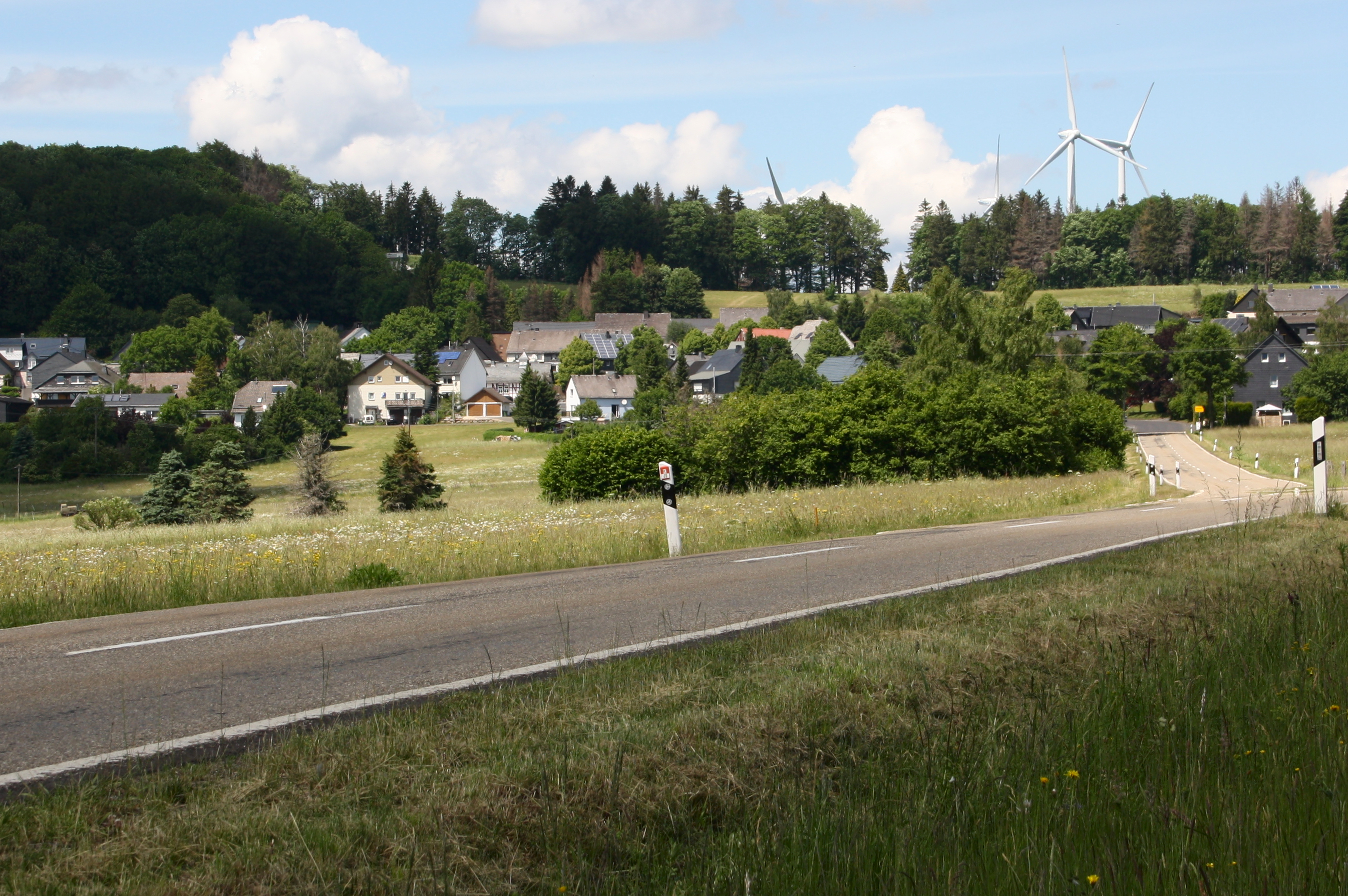

- Coat of arms

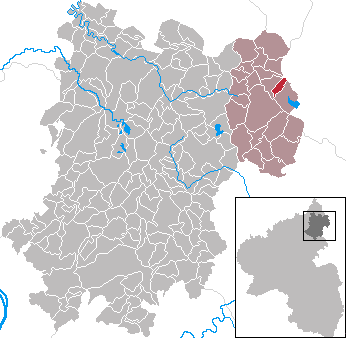
- Location of Homberg within Westerwaldkreis district
- Interactive map of Homberg
- Location within Germany Location within Rhineland-Palatinate
- Coordinates: 50°38′32″N 8°06′23″E
- Country: Germany
- State: Rhineland-Palatinate
- District: Westerwaldkreis
- Municipal assoc.: Rennerod

Government
  - Mayor (2019–24): Michael Gräb

Area
  - Total: 2.16 km^{2} (0.83 sq mi)
- Elevation: 585 m (1,919 ft)

Population (2025-12-31)
  - Total: 196
  - Density: 90.7/km^{2} (235/sq mi)
- Time zone: UTC+01:00 (CET)
  - Summer (DST): UTC+02:00 (CEST)
- Postal codes: 56479
- Dialling codes: 02664
- Vehicle registration: WW
- Website: www.homberg-westerwald.de

Homberg (German pronunciation: [ˈhɔmbɛʁk]) is an Ortsgemeinde – a community belonging to a Verbandsgemeinde – in the Westerwaldkreis in Rhineland-Palatinate, Germany. It belongs to the Verbandsgemeinde of Rennerod, a kind of collective municipality.

== Geography ==
The community lies in the Westerwald between Siegen and Limburg on the 634 m-high Homberg (mountain). About 1 km to the west is found the Breitenbach Reservoir on the Breitenbach, an eastern tributary to the river Nister.

== History ==
In 1256, Homberg had its first documentary mention as Hoimberch über dem Westerwald.

== Politics ==
=== Community council ===
The council is made up of 6 council members who were elected in a majority vote in a municipal election on 13 June 2004.

=== Mayor ===
The community's mayor (Bürgermeister) is Michael Gräb (independent).

== Economy and infrastructure ==
The village is served by the local bus lines 477 and 480 and located in the area of the transport association Verkehrsverbund Rhein-Mosel (VRM), fare zone number 458. South of the community runs Bundesstraße 255, leading from Montabaur to Herborn. The nearest Autobahn interchange is Herborn on the A 45 (Dortmund–Hanau), some 20 km away. The nearest InterCityExpress stop is the railway station at Montabaur on the Cologne-Frankfurt high-speed rail line.
