= Hüblingen =

- Municipality
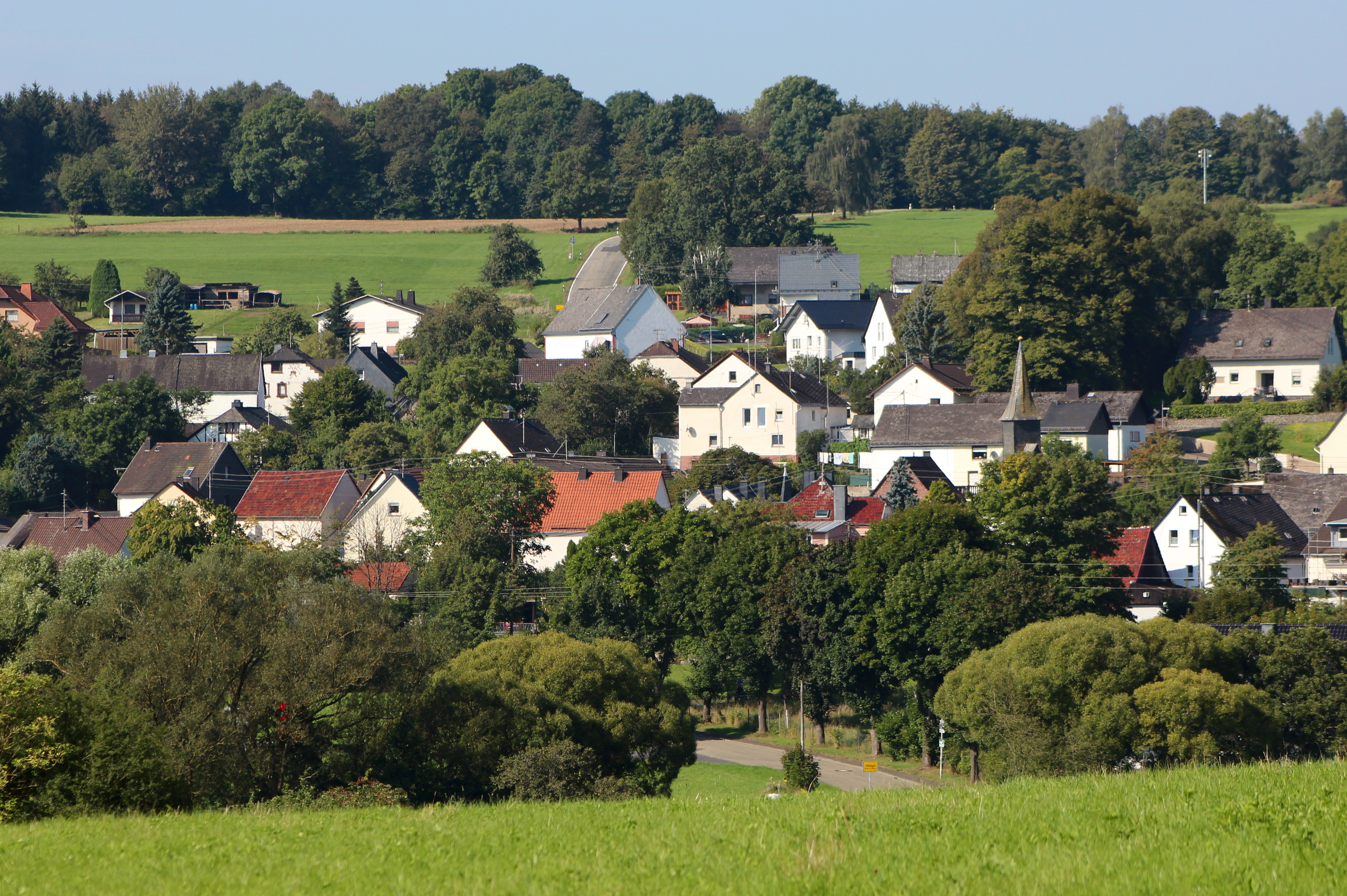

- Coat of arms

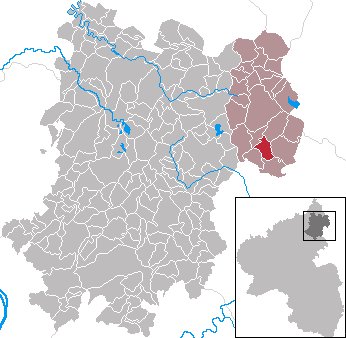
- Location of Hüblingen within Westerwaldkreis district
- Interactive map of Hüblingen
- Location within Germany Location within Rhineland-Palatinate
- Coordinates: 50°34′00″N 8°05′17″E
- Country: Germany
- State: Rhineland-Palatinate
- District: Westerwaldkreis
- Municipal assoc.: Rennerod

Government
  - Mayor (2019–24): Wolfgang Kämpchen

Area
  - Total: 4.50 km^{2} (1.74 sq mi)
- Elevation: 365 m (1,198 ft)

Population (2025-12-31)
  - Total: 284
  - Density: 63.1/km^{2} (163/sq mi)
- Time zone: UTC+01:00 (CET)
  - Summer (DST): UTC+02:00 (CEST)
- Postal codes: 56479
- Dialling codes: 02664
- Vehicle registration: WW
- Website: www.rennerod.de

Hüblingen is an Ortsgemeinde – a community belonging to a Verbandsgemeinde – in the Westerwaldkreis in Rhineland-Palatinate, Germany.

== Geography ==
The community lies in the Westerwald between the towns of Siegen (36 km to the north), Wetzlar (29 km to the east) and Limburg an der Lahn (20 km to the south). Hüblingen belongs to the Verbandsgemeinde of Rennerod, a kind of collective municipality.

== Politics ==
The municipal council is made up of 6 council members who were elected in a majority vote in a municipal election on 13 June 2004.

== Economy and infrastructure ==
The local bus lines 477, 480 and 957 connect the village to the public transport, it is located in the area of the transport association Verkehrsverbund Rhein-Mosel (VRM), zone number 443. West of the community runs Bundesstraße 54, leading from Limburg an der Lahn to Siegen. The nearest Autobahn interchange is Limburg-Nord on the A 3 (Cologne–Frankfurt), some 22 km away. The nearest InterCityExpress stop is the railway station at Limburg an der Lahn on the Cologne-Frankfurt high-speed rail line.
