= Westerwaldkreis =

Coordinates: 50°31′N 7°52′E

- District
- Flag Coat of arms
- Country: Germany
- State: Rhineland-Palatinate
- Capital: Montabaur

Government
  - District admin.: Achim Schwickert (CDU)

Area
  - Total: 988.73 km^{2} (381.75 sq mi)

Population (31 December 2025)
  - Total: 207,683
  - Density: 210.05/km^{2} (544.03/sq mi)
- Time zone: UTC+01:00 (CET)
  - Summer (DST): UTC+02:00 (CEST)
- Vehicle registration: WW
- Website: westerwald-kreis.de

The Westerwaldkreis ("District of Westerwald") is a district (Kreis) in the north-east of Rhineland-Palatinate, Germany. Neighbouring districts are (from north clockwise) Altenkirchen, Lahn-Dill, Limburg-Weilburg, Rhein-Lahn, the district-free city Koblenz, Mayen-Koblenz and Neuwied.

== History ==
When the area became part of Prussia in 1866 two districts covering the area were created. The northern part was covered by the Oberwesterwaldkreis with capital in Marienberg, the Unterwesterwaldkreis with capital in Montabaur covering the southern part. In 1886 a third district was added with the Westerburg district with area from both of the other two districts. In 1932 the districts structure was reformed again, the Oberwesterwaldkreis and the Westerburg district were merged to a new Oberwesterwaldkreis with capital in Westerburg. In 1974 in another reform the districts Oberwesterwaldkreis and Unterwesterwaldkreis were merged to form the Westerwaldkreis.

Together with the neighboring Rhein-Lahn district a partnership with the English county Northamptonshire was started in 1981. As part of the partnership of Rhineland-Palatinate with Rwanda the district had a partnership with the municipality Mugesera since 1983. As in 2001 this municipality was included in the district Mirenge the partner changed.

== Geography ==
The district is located in the Westerwald mountains. Its highest elevation is the Fuchskaute, at 657 m, the lowest is near Diez in the valley of the Gelbach, at 150 m.

== Coat of arms ==
The bottom part of the coat of arms show basalt pillars, as the Westerwald is of volcanic origin. There are seven pillars representing the seven Verbandsgemeinden of the district which have basalt or quartzite in their area. The green band in the middle represents the forests, the jug in the upper part the traditional pottery industry in the district.

== Towns and municipalities ==
Verbandsgemeinden
1. Bad Marienberg; 1. Bad Marienberg^{1, 2}; 2. Bölsberg; 3. Dreisbach; 4. Fehl-Ritzhausen; 5. Großseifen; 6. Hahn bei Marienberg; 7. Hardt; 8. Hof; 9. Kirburg; 10. Langenbach bei Kirburg; 11. Lautzenbrücken; 12. Mörlen; 13. Neunkhausen; 14. Nisterau; 15. Nistertal; 16. Norken; 17. Stockhausen-Illfurth; 18. Unnau; 2. Hachenburg; 1. Alpenrod; 2. Astert; 3. Atzelgift; 4. Borod; 5. Dreifelden; 6. Gehlert; 7. Giesenhausen; 8. Hachenburg^{1, 2}; 9. Hattert; 10. Heimborn; 11. Heuzert; 12. Höchstenbach; 13. Kroppach; 14. Kundert; 15. Limbach; 16. Linden; 17. Lochum; 18. Luckenbach; 19. Marzhausen; 20. Merkelbach; 21. Mörsbach; 22. Mudenbach; 23. Mündersbach; 24. Müschenbach; 25. Nister; 26. Roßbach; 27. Steinebach an der Wied; 28. Stein-Wingert; 29. Streithausen; 30. Wahlrod; 31. Welkenbach; 32. Wied; 33. Winkelbach	3. Höhr-Grenzhausen; 1. Hilgert; 2. Hillscheid; 3. Höhr-Grenzhausen^{1, 2}; 4. Kammerforst; 4. Montabaur; 1. Boden; 2. Daubach; 3. Eitelborn; 4. Gackenbach; 5. Girod; 6. Görgeshausen; 7. Großholbach; 8. Heilberscheid; 9. Heiligenroth; 10. Holler; 11. Horbach; 12. Hübingen; 13. Kadenbach; 14. Montabaur^{1, 2}; 15. Nentershausen; 16. Neuhäusel; 17. Niederelbert; 18. Niedererbach; 19. Nomborn; 20. Oberelbert; 21. Ruppach-Goldhausen; 22. Simmern; 23. Stahlhofen; 24. Untershausen; 25. Welschneudorf; 5. Ransbach-Baumbach; 1. Alsbach; 2. Breitenau; 3. Caan; 4. Deesen; 5. Hundsdorf; 6. Nauort; 7. Oberhaid; 8. Ransbach-Baumbach^{1, 2}; 9. Sessenbach; 10. Wirscheid; 11. Wittgert	6. Rennerod; 1. Bretthausen; 2. Elsoff; 3. Hellenhahn-Schellenberg; 4. Homberg; 5. Hüblingen; 6. Irmtraut; 7. Liebenscheid; 8. Neunkirchen; 9. Neustadt; 10. Niederroßbach; 11. Nister-Möhrendorf; 12. Oberrod; 13. Oberroßbach; 14. Rehe; 15. Rennerod^{1, 2}; 16. Salzburg; 17. Seck; 18. Stein-Neukirch; 19. Waigandshain; 20. Waldmühlen; 21. Westernohe; 22. Willingen; 23. Zehnhausen bei Rennerod; 7. Selters; 1. Ellenhausen; 2. Ewighausen; 3. Freilingen; 4. Freirachdorf; 5. Goddert; 6. Hartenfels; 7. Herschbach, Selters; 8. Krümmel; 9. Marienrachdorf; 10. Maroth; 11. Maxsain; 12. Nordhofen; 13. Quirnbach; 14. Rückeroth; 15. Schenkelberg; 16. Selters^{1, 2}; 17. Sessenhausen; 18. Steinen; 19. Vielbach; 20. Weidenhahn; 21. Wölferlingen	8. Wallmerod; 1. Arnshöfen; 2. Berod bei Wallmerod; 3. Bilkheim; 4. Dreikirchen; 5. Elbingen; 6. Ettinghausen; 7. Hahn am See; 8. Herschbach, Wallmerod; 9. Hundsangen; 10. Kuhnhöfen; 11. Mähren; 12. Meudt; 13. Molsberg; 14. Niederahr; 15. Oberahr; 16. Obererbach; 17. Salz; 18. Steinefrenz; 19. Wallmerod^{1}; 20. Weroth; 21. Zehnhausen bei Wallmerod; 9. Westerburg; 1. Ailertchen; 2. Bellingen; 3. Berzhahn; 4. Brandscheid; 5. Enspel; 6. Gemünden; 7. Girkenroth; 8. Guckheim; 9. Halbs; 10. Härtlingen; 11. Hergenroth; 12. Höhn; 13. Kaden; 14. Kölbingen; 15. Langenhahn; 16. Pottum; 17. Rotenhain; 18. Rothenbach; 19. Stahlhofen am Wiesensee; 20. Stockum-Püschen; 21. Weltersburg; 22. Westerburg^{1, 2}; 23. Willmenrod; 24. Winnen; 10. Wirges; 1. Bannberscheid; 2. Dernbach; 3. Ebernhahn; 4. Helferskirchen; 5. Leuterod; 6. Mogendorf; 7. Moschheim; 8. Niedersayn; 9. Ötzingen; 10. Siershahn; 11. Staudt; 12. Wirges^{1, 2}
^{1}seat of the Verbandsgemeinde; ^{2}town

== Economy and infrastructure ==
=== Electricity production ===
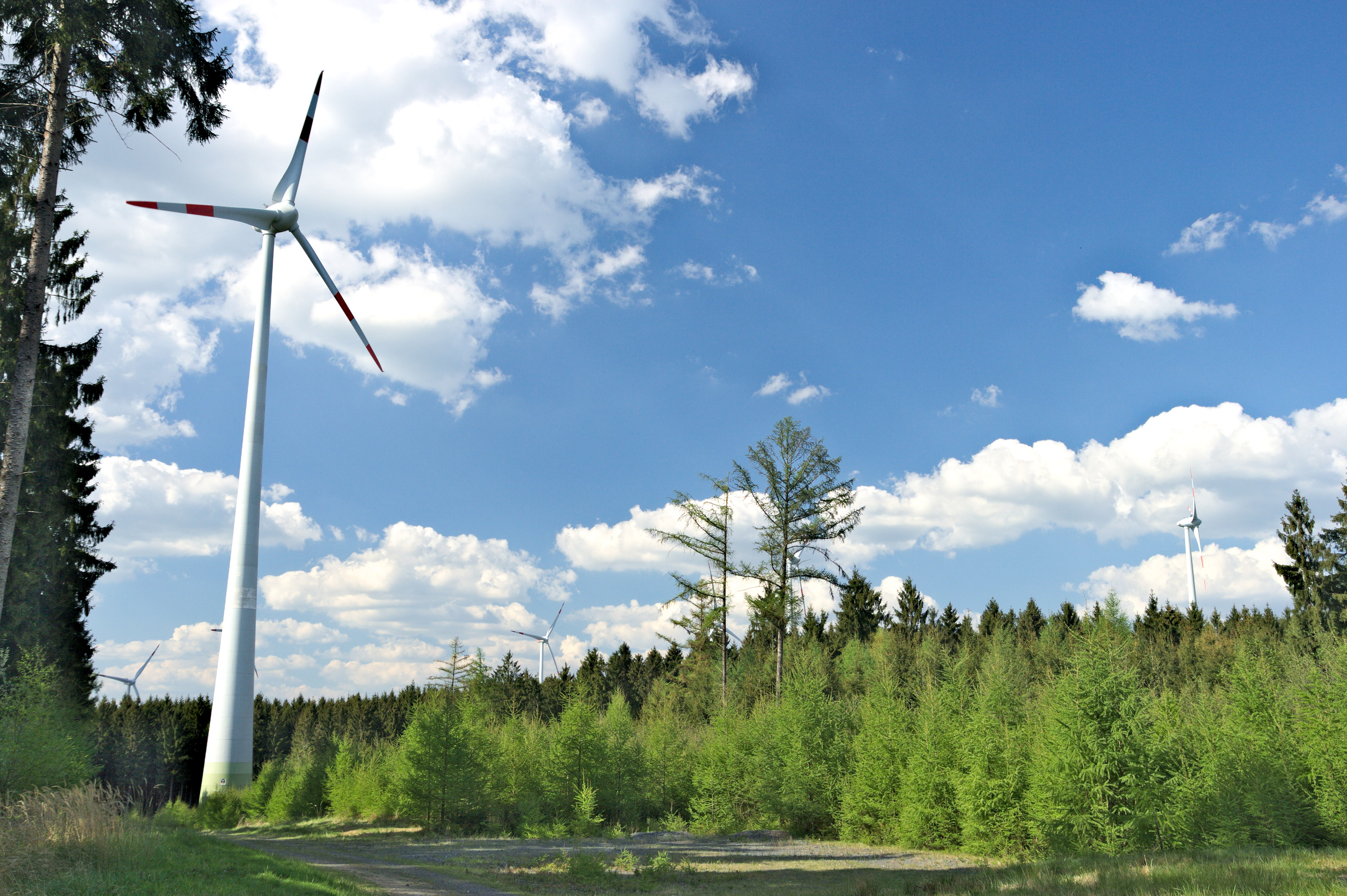
Wind park Hartenfelser Kopf near Mündersbach

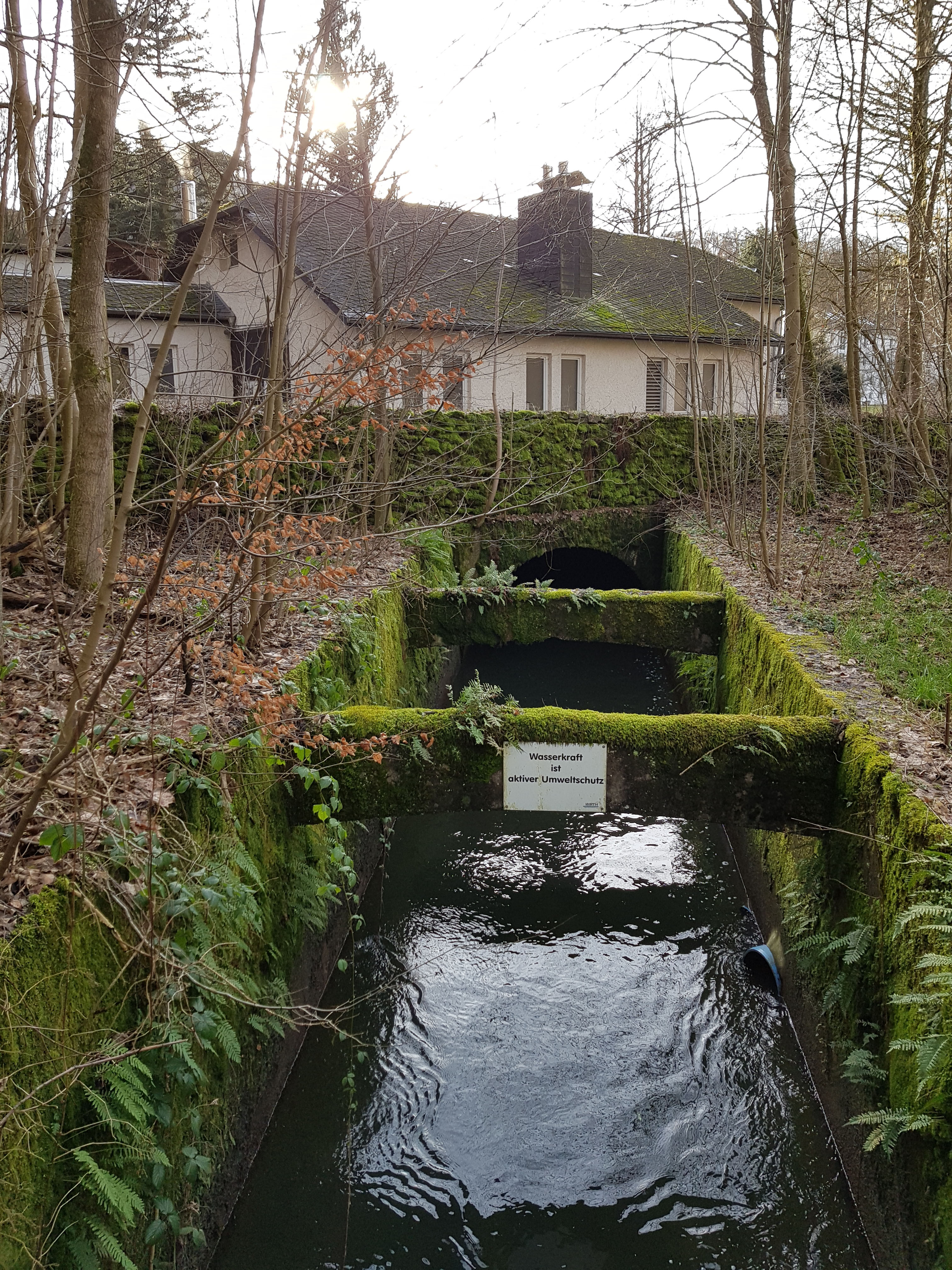
Hydropower plant at Marienstatt Abbey

A large number of the produced electricity within the district comes from responsible electricity production.

There are large solar parks like the largest one, the solar parks in Westerburg, also large Wind farms are located all over the district, especially in the surrounding area of Hachenburg and Rennerod.

Electricity from hydropower is for example at the Marienstatt Abbey of the Cistercians in Streithausen, at the river Nister, near Hachenburg.

Also the electricity produced through biomass is an important source, Westerwald district has the largest number in the state Rhineland-Palatinate.

=== Water supply ===
Ground water comes from several springs all over the district, but because it became less over the last years, some municipalities buy wwter from overregional sources, organized by the Vereinigte Wasserwerke Mittelrhein.

==== Healing springs ====
Healing springs are located in Maxsain and Bad Marienberg (Marienquelle).

=== Waste management ===
Westerwaldkreis Abfallwirtschaftsbetrieb (WAB) has its headquarters in Moschheim, further locations are in Meudt, Renenrod, Hergenroth and Luckenbach.

=== Transport ===
Logo of Verkehrsverbund Rhein-Mosel

Following railway lines are partly located in the Westerwaldkreis:

- RB29 (Lower Westerwald railway), in operation for passenger and fright transport, service section from Niedererbach to Siershahn located in Westerwaldkreis.
- RB90 (Westerwald-Sieg-railway), in operation for passenger and fright transport, service section from Willmenrod to Hattert located in Westerwaldkreis.
- Westerwaldquerbahn, fright transport between Montabaur station and Wallmerod, touristic Draisine transport from Rennerod to Fehl-Ritzhausen, operated by interest group IG Westerwald Querbahn (IWQ e. V.), deconstructed from Wallmerod to Westerburg and from Renenrod to Herborn.
- Engers-Au railway, reactivation plans for the section DreiLänderBahn from Engers via Ransbach-Baumbach to Siershahn station (Brexbach Valley railway) and continuing to Montabaur station, fright transport from Siershahn to Altenkirchen via Selters, Puderbach and Flammersfeld, (Holzbach Valley railway), public transport from Altenkirchen to Au (Sieg) (RB90). There also was a section from Grenzau via Höhr-Grenzhausen to Hillscheid.
- Selters-Hachenburg railway, from Selters via Höchstenbach and Hattert to Hachenburg, out of service and deconstructed.
- Erbach-Fehl Ritzhausen railway from Nistertal-Bad Marienberg station via Bad Marienberg to Fehl-Ritzhausen, out of service and deconstructed.

The only station of the long distance train service is Montabaur station. The nowadays only two local train lines, RB29 and RB90 are operated by Hessische Landesbahn, section DreiLänderBahn. Westerwaldkreis is member of the transport association Verkehrsverbund Rhein-Mosel (VRM), whose fare applies.

The only two local passenger train lines are operated by Hessische Landesbahn (HLB), section DreiLänderBahn.
