= Liebenscheid =

- Municipality
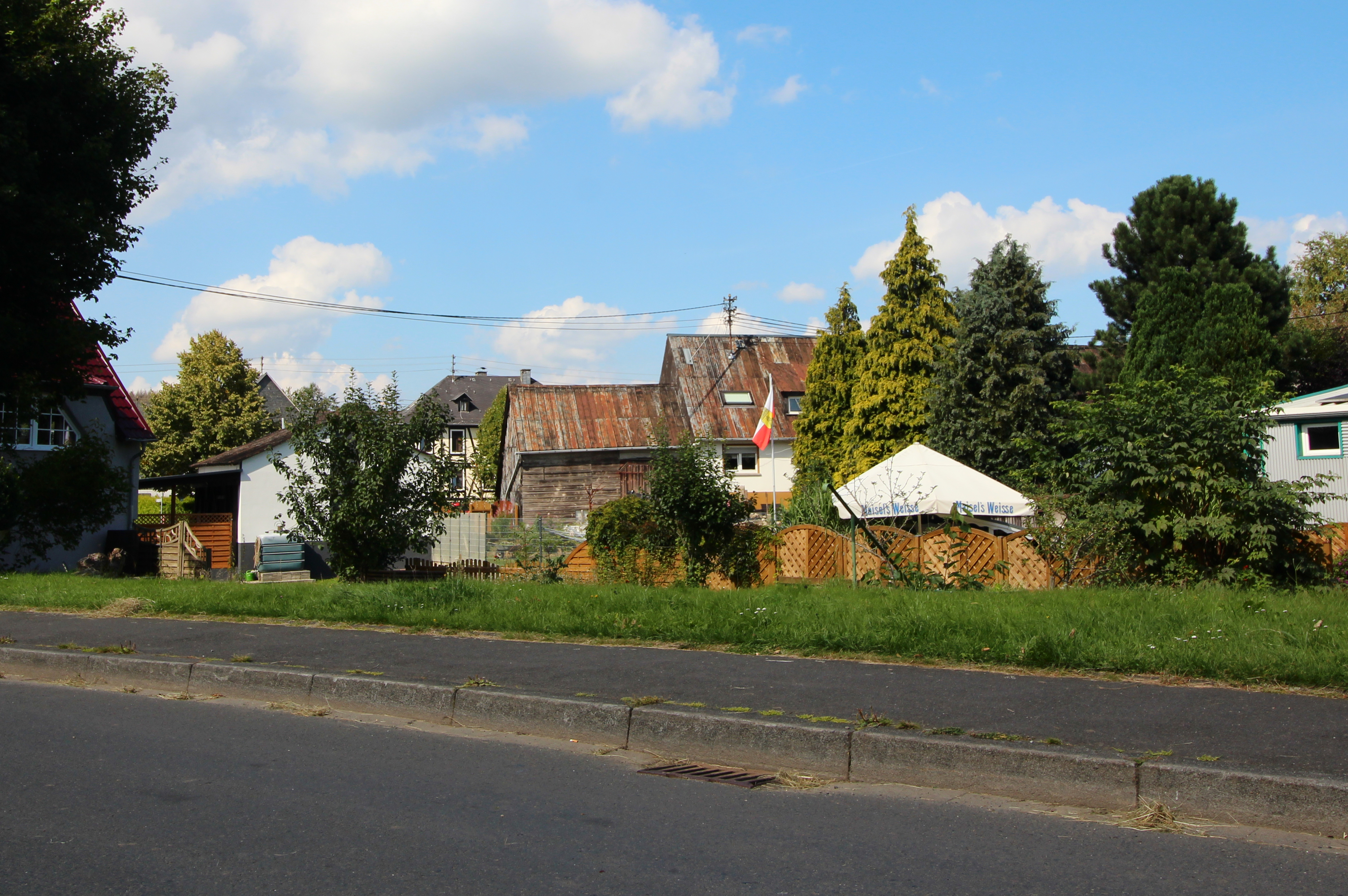

- Coat of arms

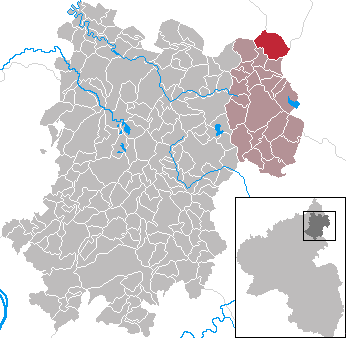
- Location of Liebenscheid within Westerwaldkreis district
- Interactive map of Liebenscheid
- Location within Germany Location within Rhineland-Palatinate
- Coordinates: 50°41′50″N 8°5′54″E
- Country: Germany
- State: Rhineland-Palatinate
- District: Westerwaldkreis
- Municipal assoc.: Rennerod

Government
  - Mayor (2019–24): Mechthild Hoffmann

Area
  - Total: 10.56 km^{2} (4.08 sq mi)
- Elevation: 535 m (1,755 ft)

Population (2025-12-31)
  - Total: 845
  - Density: 80.0/km^{2} (207/sq mi)
- Time zone: UTC+01:00 (CET)
  - Summer (DST): UTC+02:00 (CEST)
- Postal codes: 56479
- Dialling codes: 02667
- Vehicle registration: WW
- Website: www.rennerod.de

Liebenscheid is an Ortsgemeinde – a community belonging to a Verbandsgemeinde – in the Westerwaldkreis in Rhineland-Palatinate, Germany.

== Geography ==
=== Location ===
The community lies in the Westerwald between Siegen and Limburg on the boundaries with North Rhine-Westphalia and Hesse. Liebenscheid belongs to the Verbandsgemeinde of Rennerod, a kind of collective municipality.

=== Constituent communities ===
Liebenscheid has two outlying centres named Weißenberg and Löhnfeld.

== History ==
In 1341, Liebenscheid had its first documentary mention in a partition treaty between the sons of Count Johann I of Nassau-Dillenburg. At this time there also stood Schloss Liebenscheid, a residential castle, which was later taken down.

In 1360, Liebenscheid, together with the neighbouring village of Weißenberg, was granted town rights by Emperor Karl IV, whereby the Emperor bestowed upon the two places the same rights that the Imperial town of Wetzlar held.

== Politics ==
The municipal council is made up of 12 council members who were elected in a majority vote in municipal elections.

== Economy and infrastructure ==
=== Transport links ===
The local bus line 960 runs from Rennerod via Liebenscheid to Bad Marienberg. Liebenscheid is located in the zone number 459 of the transport association Verkehrsverbund Rhein-Mosel (VRM). West of the community runs Bundesstraße 54, leading from Limburg an der Lahn to Siegen. The nearest Autobahn interchange is Haiger/Burbach on the A 45 (Dortmund–Aschaffenburg), some 11 km away. The nearest InterCityExpress stop is the railway station at Montabaur on the Cologne-Frankfurt high-speed rail line. The nearest air travel connection is offered by the Siegerland Airport lying a few kilometres west of the community.

=== Electricity supply ===
In Liebenscheid the wind turbine company Fuhrländer was located.
