= Rennerod (Verbandsgemeinde) =

- Verbandsgemeinde
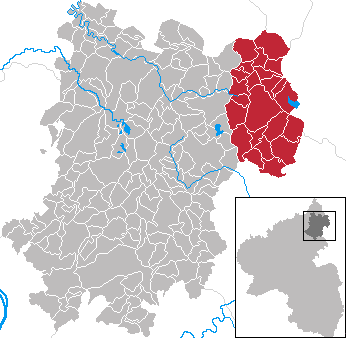
- Location of Rennerod within Westerwaldkreis district
- Interactive map of Rennerod
- Location within Germany Location within Rhineland-Palatinate
- Coordinates: 50°36′N 8°04′E
- Country: Germany
- State: Rhineland-Palatinate
- District: Westerwaldkreis
- Seat: Rennerod
- Subdivisions: 23 municipalities

Area
  - Total: 133.06 km^{2} (51.37 sq mi)

Population (2025-12-31)
  - Total: 17,099
  - Density: 128.51/km^{2} (332.83/sq mi)
- Time zone: UTC+01:00 (CET)
  - Summer (DST): UTC+02:00 (CEST)
- Website: www.rennerod.de

Rennerod is a Verbandsgemeinde ("collective municipality") in the district Westerwaldkreis, in Rhineland-Palatinate, Germany. The seat of the Verbandsgemeinde is in Rennerod.

The Verbandsgemeinde Rennerod consists of the following Ortsgemeinden ("local municipalities"):

1. Bretthausen
2. Elsoff
3. Hellenhahn-Schellenberg
4. Homberg
5. Hüblingen
6. Irmtraut
7. Liebenscheid
8. Neunkirchen
9. Neustadt
10. Niederroßbach
11. Nister-Möhrendorf
12. Oberrod
13. Oberroßbach
14. Rehe
15. Rennerod
16. Salzburg
17. Seck
18. Stein-Neukirch
19. Waigandshain
20. Waldmühlen
21. Westernohe
22. Willingen
23. Zehnhausen bei Rennerod
