= Westernohe =

- Municipality
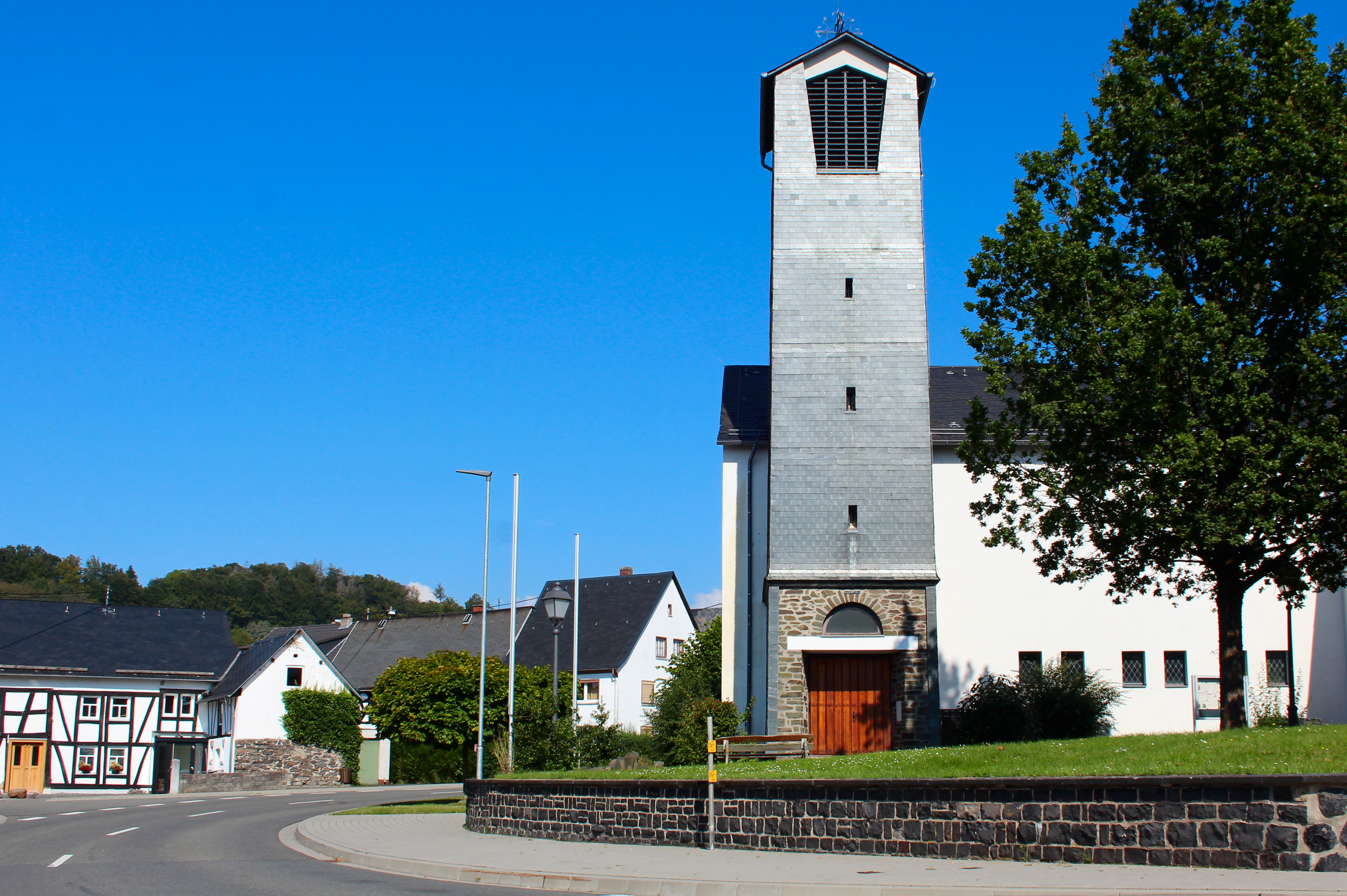

- Coat of arms

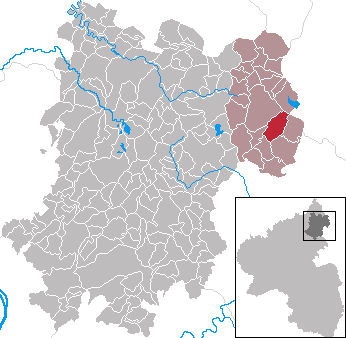
- Location of Westernohe within Westerwaldkreis district
- Interactive map of Westernohe
- Location within Germany Location within Rhineland-Palatinate
- Coordinates: 50°35′21″N 8°6′1″E
- Country: Germany
- State: Rhineland-Palatinate
- District: Westerwaldkreis
- Municipal assoc.: Rennerod

Government
  - Mayor (2019–24): Volker Abel

Area
  - Total: 7.50 km^{2} (2.90 sq mi)
- Elevation: 425 m (1,394 ft)

Population (2025-12-31)
  - Total: 990
  - Density: 130/km^{2} (340/sq mi)
- Time zone: UTC+01:00 (CET)
  - Summer (DST): UTC+02:00 (CEST)
- Postal codes: 56479
- Dialling codes: 02664
- Vehicle registration: WW

Westernohe is an Ortsgemeinde – a community belonging to a Verbandsgemeinde – in the Westerwaldkreis in Rhineland-Palatinate, Germany.

== Geography ==
The community lies in the Westerwald between Siegen (34 km to the north), Wetzlar (28 km to the east) and Limburg (24 km to the south). Westernohe belongs to the Verbandsgemeinde of Rennerod, a kind of collective municipality. Its seat is in the like-named town. In Westernohe itself is a big campground of the Deutsche Pfadfinderschaft Sankt Georg (DPSG).

== History ==
In 1059, Westernohe had its first documented mention as Westernaha.

=== Tug of war incident ===
In 1995, 650 young scouts participated in a tug-of-war competition. When the rope broke, only 20 seconds into the tug, two children were killed and 102 participants suffered injuries. The rope was judged to be unsuited for the use in the related court case.

== Politics ==
The municipal council is made up of 12 council members who were elected in a majority vote in a municipal election on 13 June 2004.

== Economy and infrastructure ==
Westernohe has access to the local bus lines 477, 480, 487, 957 and N47, the village is located in the area of the transport association Verkehrsverbund Rhein-Mosel (VRM), in the fare zone number 444. The Bundesstraße 54, links Limburg an der Lahn with Siegen, runs 3 km west of the community. The nearest Autobahn interchange is Herborn on the A 45 (Dortmund–Aschaffenburg), some 22 km away. The nearest InterCityExpress stop is the railway station at Montabaur on the Cologne-Frankfurt high-speed rail line.
