= Rennerod =

- Town
- Coat of arms

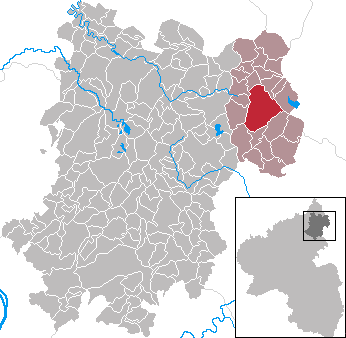
- Location of Rennerod within Westerwaldkreis district
- Interactive map of Rennerod
- Location within Germany Location within Rhineland-Palatinate
- Coordinates: 50°36′35″N 8°4′8″E
- Country: Germany
- State: Rhineland-Palatinate
- District: Westerwaldkreis
- Municipal assoc.: Rennerod

Government
  - Mayor (2019–24): Raimund Scharwat (SPD)

Area
  - Total: 18.14 km^{2} (7.00 sq mi)
- Elevation: 540 m (1,770 ft)

Population (2025-12-31)
  - Total: 4,443
  - Density: 244.9/km^{2} (634.4/sq mi)
- Time zone: UTC+01:00 (CET)
  - Summer (DST): UTC+02:00 (CEST)
- Postal codes: 56477
- Dialling codes: 02664
- Vehicle registration: WW
- Website: www.stadt-rennerod.de

Rennerod (German pronunciation: [ˈʁɛnəʁoːt]) is a town in the Westerwaldkreis in Rhineland-Palatinate, Germany. It is the administrative seat of the Verbandsgemeinde of Rennerod, a kind of collective municipality. Within the municipal area, until German Reunification on 3 October 1990, lay the Federal Republic's geographical centre.

== Geography ==
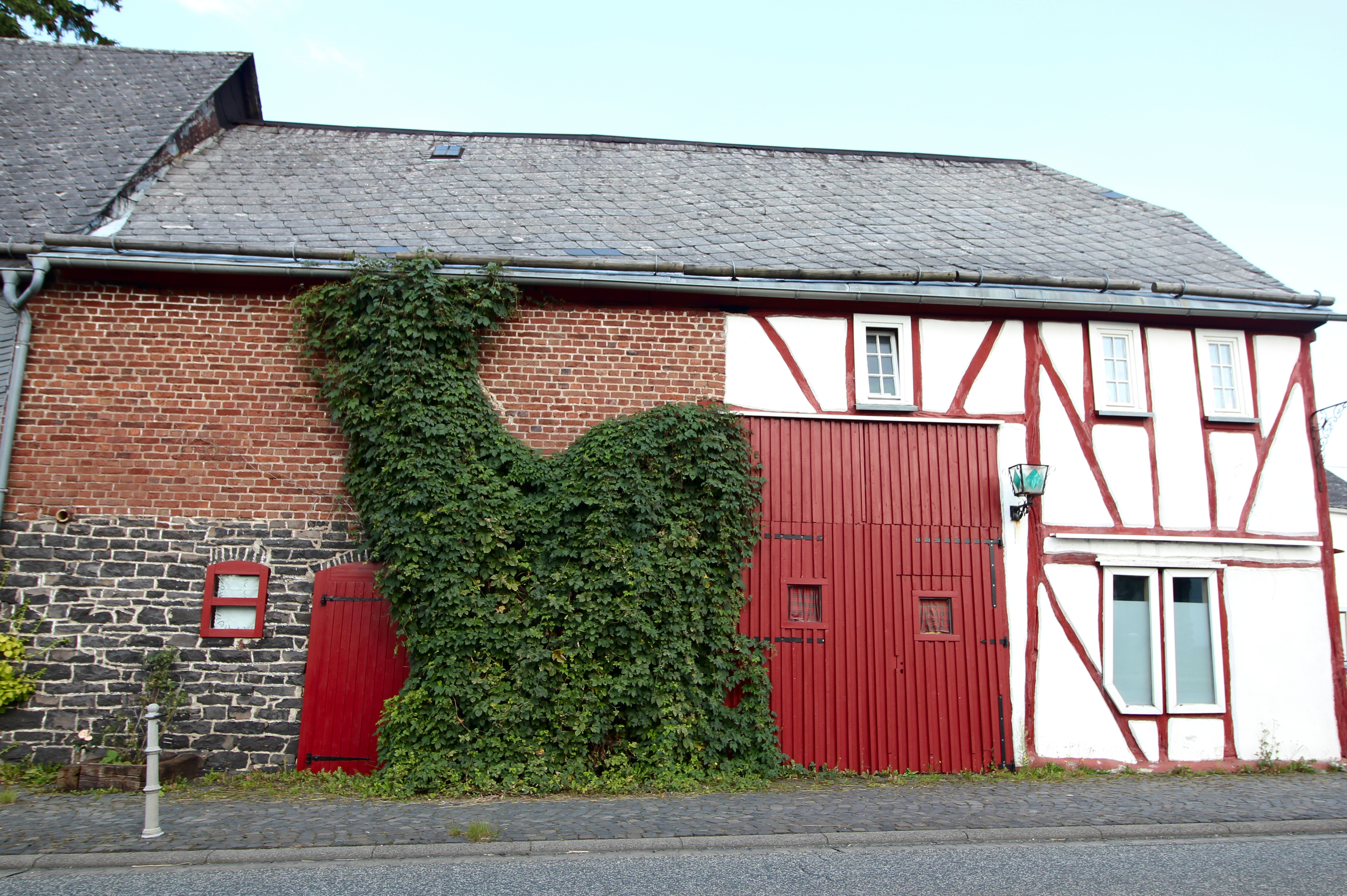
Rennerod's district Emmerichenhain

Rennerod lies in the Westerwald between Limburg an der Lahn in the south and Siegen 30 km to the north. Bad Marienberg lies 10 km to Rennerod's northwest. Through the town flows the Holzbach. Northeast of the town is found the 613 m-high Alsberg, some 2 km north-northeast of the Breitenbach Reservoir on the Breitenbach, an eastern tributary to the river Nister. Rennerod has one district named Emmerichenhain.

== History ==
In 1217, Reynderode had its first documentary mention. Its founding, however, might go back to Carolingian times. The settlement's importance stemmed from its location on several trading roads that linked the Siegerland, Koblenz, Frankfurt, the Lahn area and Mainz. Referring to the salt trade are field names such as Seltzerweg and Selßer Heck. Supposedly, the settlement would have been enclosed in the mid-11th century by the Counts of Diez, likely also to defend the Niederlahngau's northern border.

After the Counts of Diez, the Nassau lines of Nassau-Diez became the landlords, as of 1420 to half of Nassau-Dillenburg, and as of 1557 to three fourths, and as well to Eppstein-Königstein, the Electorate of Trier, Katzenelnbogen and the Landgraviate of Hesse. As of 1564, Rennerod was wholly part of Nassau-Dillenburg, as of 1606 of Nassau-Beilstein, as of 1620 of Nassau-Hadamar, as of 1717 of Nassau-Diez, as of 1743 of Nassau-Orange and as of 1806 of the Grand Duchy of Berg. The House of Merenberg had considerable holdings in Rennerod's municipal area. The House of Runkel owned the church patronage as well as other lordly rights. Further rights were held by the Lords of Westerburg as well as other noble houses and ecclesiastical institutions.

No later than 1452, Rennerod was for the first time a tithe count's seat, and thereby also a court's. Until 1591, Rennerod asserted itself against neighbouring Emerichenhain, which for a time also held the court seat. “Blood court” jurisdiction, however, was only carried out in the community until 1650 or thereabouts. The last documentary proof for a tithe count in Rennerod goes back to 1731. In 1720, a new Amt was instituted, which in the years that followed took over the functions of the court region. The Amtmann sat first in Rennerod, later in Westernohe, and as of 1744, the Amt administration was in Hadamar. As of 1775, Rennerod was once again the seat, keeping this function on into the time when it became Duchy of Nassau domain.

Ecclesiastically, Rennerod was at first under Seck’s care. In 1344 the parish passed to the Gemünden Monastery. In 1362, the first chapel was built in Rennerod, which was consecrated to Mary and Saint Huprecht. In 1565, Rennerod became Lutheran. After various shifts in parish regions as a result of the Reformation, Rennerod was given its own parish in 1614 which also had several outlying communities under its care. The next year, the first parish house was standing. Between 1614 and 1631, the chapel was expanded into a parish church. In 1631, the parish became Catholic again. In 1777, the steeple was in an ill state of repair and had to be torn down; the next year, a smaller one was built. In 1876 a completely new building was put up for the church. In 1665, the Antonskapelle came into being.

A schoolmaster is known to have been in Rennerod as of 1609, and in 1738, a schoolhouse. In 1750, the (reformed) parish house and schoolhouse came into being from the renovated house formerly occupied by the Flick family of tithe counts. As of 1812 it served as a gendarmerie barracks and as food storage. After the reformed parish's abolition, the Catholic parish bought it as a parish house in 1817.

Rennerod's main livelihood over the centuries was agriculture. Because it lay on the long-distance road, there were many inns. In the 18th century, brown coal was still being mined, although yields were quite small. It is known that in the 16th and 18th centuries, there were millstone quarries. A livestock market is first known to have existed in 1742, and last in 1811. A mill is first known to have existed in 1454.

In 1969, Emmerichenhain was amalgamated as an Ortsteil. In 1971, Rennerod was granted town rights. In 1972, it became the seat of the Verbandsgemeinde of Rennerod, to which 23 formerly independent communities were joined.

Several now forsaken villages are known to have lain within Rennerod's municipal area: Finkenhain, Himmenhain, Fackenhahn, Seiblingen, Seitenstein, Fuhrmannshof, Waldmühlen (occupied at least until 1811), Eichelerhof and Küchenhofen (forsaken no later than 1484)

== Politics ==
=== Town council ===
The council is made up of 20 council members, as well as the honorary and presiding mayor (Bürgermeister), who were elected in a municipal election on 13 June 2004.

	CDU	SPD	FWG	WG Emmerichenhain	Total
2004	8	6	3	3	20 seats

=== Mayor ===
The Stadtbürgermeister is Raimund Scharwat (SPD).

=== Coat of arms ===
The town's arms, modelled on the community seal from 1816, in Nassau times, was approved as the town's civic coat of arms on 21 May 1940.

== Economy and infrastructure ==
=== Transport ===
Rennerod station

Rennerod is connected to the public local bus transport through the lines 477, 480, 483, 484, 487, 957, 960 and 971. Most important bus stops in Rennerod are the Rennerod Busbahnhof as well as the Westernoher Str. stop.

Rennerod is located in the area of the transport association Verkehrsverbund Rhein-Mosel (VRM), Tarifwabe (fare zone) number 444.

Within the town, two Bundesstraßen, B 54 linking Limburg an der Lahn with Siegen and B 255 leading from Montabaur to Marburg, cross each other. The nearest Autobahn interchange is Herborn on the A 45 (Dortmund–Aschaffenburg), some 20 km away, and there is also Montabaur on the A 3 (Cologne–Frankfurt), some 35 km away.

Rennerod had a station on the Herborn–Montabaur railway, also known as Westerwaldquerbahn ("cross Westerwald railway"), a former line from Herborn via Rennerod, Fehl-Ritzhausen, Westerburg and Wallmerod to Montabaur. Services between Herborn and Rennerod was abandoned on 31 May 1959, and that between Rennerod and Montabaur on 31 May 1981.

Railbike rides take place between Rennerod and Fehl-Ritzhausen, organized by the interest group IG Westerwald Querbahn e. V. (IWQ).

The nearest InterCityExpress stop is the railway station at Montabaur on the Cologne-Frankfurt high-speed rail line.

Rennerod is located on Westerwaldsteig, a long distance walking path from Herborn via Rennerod, Westerburg, Bad Marienberg and Hachenburg to Bad Hönningen.

=== Public institutions ===
The Sanitätsregiment (“Medical Regiment”) 2 of the Bundeswehr is stationed in Rennerod.

=== Hall ===
The Westerwaldhalle (Westerwald hall) is a hall used for events, exhibitions and celebrations.

=== Industrial area ===
The business- and industrial area Beilsteiner Feld/Fackenhahner Feld is located on the end of Rennerod in direction of Waldmühlen. Supermarkets, clothes stores, a Fressnapf store as well as a McDonalds restaurant are located there.

=== Electricity supply ===
Am Wolfsgestell is a large solar park in Rennerod.

== Notable residents ==
- Wilhelm Dörr (1921-1945), German SS and concentration camp officer executed for war crimes
