= Gemünden, Westerwaldkreis =

Gemünden
- Municipality
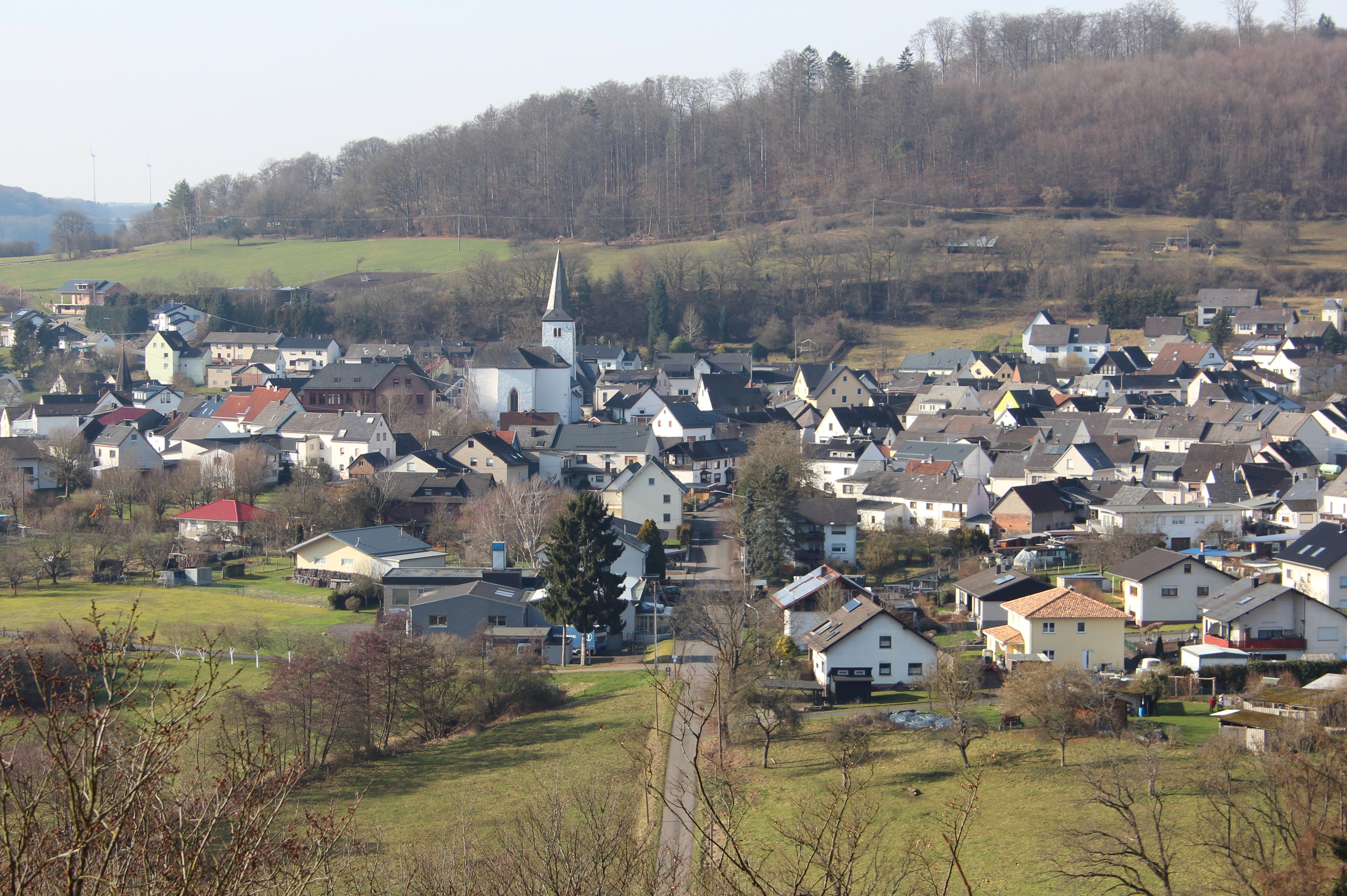

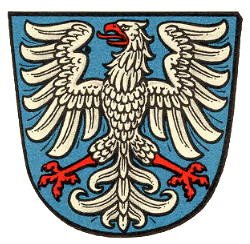
- Coat of arms

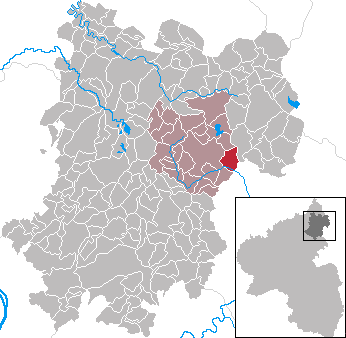
- Location of Gemünden within Westerwaldkreis district
- Interactive map of Gemünden
- Location within Germany Location within Rhineland-Palatinate
- Coordinates: 50°33′32″N 08°01′04″E
- Country: Germany
- State: Rhineland-Palatinate
- District: Westerwaldkreis
- Municipal assoc.: Westerburg

Government
  - Mayor (2019–24): Dietmar Wolf

Area
  - Total: 5.19 km^{2} (2.00 sq mi)
- Elevation: 315 m (1,033 ft)

Population (2025-12-31)
  - Total: 1,053
  - Density: 203/km^{2} (525/sq mi)
- Time zone: UTC+01:00 (CET)
  - Summer (DST): UTC+02:00 (CEST)
- Postal codes: 56459
- Dialling codes: 02663
- Vehicle registration: WW

Gemünden (German pronunciation: [ɡəˈmʏndn̩]) is an Ortsgemeinde – a municipality belonging to a Verbandsgemeinde – in the Westerwaldkreis in Rhineland-Palatinate, Germany.

== Geography ==
=== Location ===
Gemünden lies east of Westerburg, in a valley setting shielded by mountains to the north and east but wide open to the south. In the municipality, the three brooks Holzbach, Elbbach and Schafbach flow together. Since 1972 it has belonged to what was then the newly founded Verbandsgemeinde of Westerburg, a kind of collective municipality.

=== Neighbouring communities ===
Gemünden is surrounded by Winnen in the north, Westerburg in the northwest, Willmenrod and Berzhahn in the southwest, Langendernbach in the southeast and Seck and Irmtraut in the east. The closest bigger cities are Limburg in the south and Montabaur in the north.

== History ==
In 879, Gemünden had its first documentary mention. In this year, the monastery of St. Severus, built by Count Gebhard, was consecrated. Unfortunately, the endowment document has been lost. Only a copy from 1333 still exists. An idea of the event’s great political importance was shown by King Ludwig III, Charlemagne’s great-grandson, who was on hand for the occasion.

The monastery owned great estates, which are said to have reached all the way to the Rhine. In the endowment document, some of the surrounding communities were furthermore transferred to the monastery. Until the end of the 12th century, the monastery’s and its estates’ importance grew. Only with the rise in power of the Vögte (sing. Vogt – secular protectors) in the 13th century did the monastery’s power begin to wane.

In 1336, Emperor Ludwig the Bavarian empowered the monastery Vögte, whose seat was in Westerburg, by appointing them to hold the office of Vogt at Gemünden. The monastery thereby virtually lost its independence.

In 1430 and 1440, fires are said to have badly damaged the monastery church. In 1566, the monastery Vogt Reinhard II ordered the introduction of the Reformation into Gemünden. In 1580 came the first parson to Gemünden. Owing, however, to disagreements between the Lords of Westerburg and the Lords of Wied-Runkel, the latter’s armed forces attacked Gemünden later in the same year. Before this disagreement could be settled for good in 1599, there was a further attack in 1597. The institution of the monastery was swept away before 1600.

== Politics ==
The municipal council is made up of 17 council members, including the extraofficial mayor (Bürgermeister), who were elected in a majority vote in a municipal election on 7 June 2009.

== Culture and sightseeing ==
=== Buildings ===
The Evangelical monastery church came into being most likely about the year 1100 and offers visitors, among other things, remnants of Romanesque painting from the 12th century.

=== Regular events ===
On the second weekend after Whitsun, a yearly kermis is held.

On 30 April and 1 May, a “Dance into May” is held at the Gemünden fire station.

== Economy and infrastructure ==
The local bus line 477 runs from Rehe via Rennerod, Westerburg and Gemünden to Montabaur. The village is located in the area of the transport association Verkehrsverbund Rhein-Mosel (VRM), zone number 430. East of the municipality runs Bundesstraße 54, leading from Limburg an der Lahn to Siegen. Gemünden is located on Westerwaldsteig, a long distance walking- and cycling path from Herborn via Rennerod, Westerburg, Bad Marienberg and Hachenburg to Bad Hönningen. The nearest Autobahn interchange is Montabaur on the A 3 (Cologne–Frankfurt). The nearest InterCityExpress stop is the railway station at Montabaur on the Cologne-Frankfurt high-speed rail line.
