= Halbs =

- Municipality
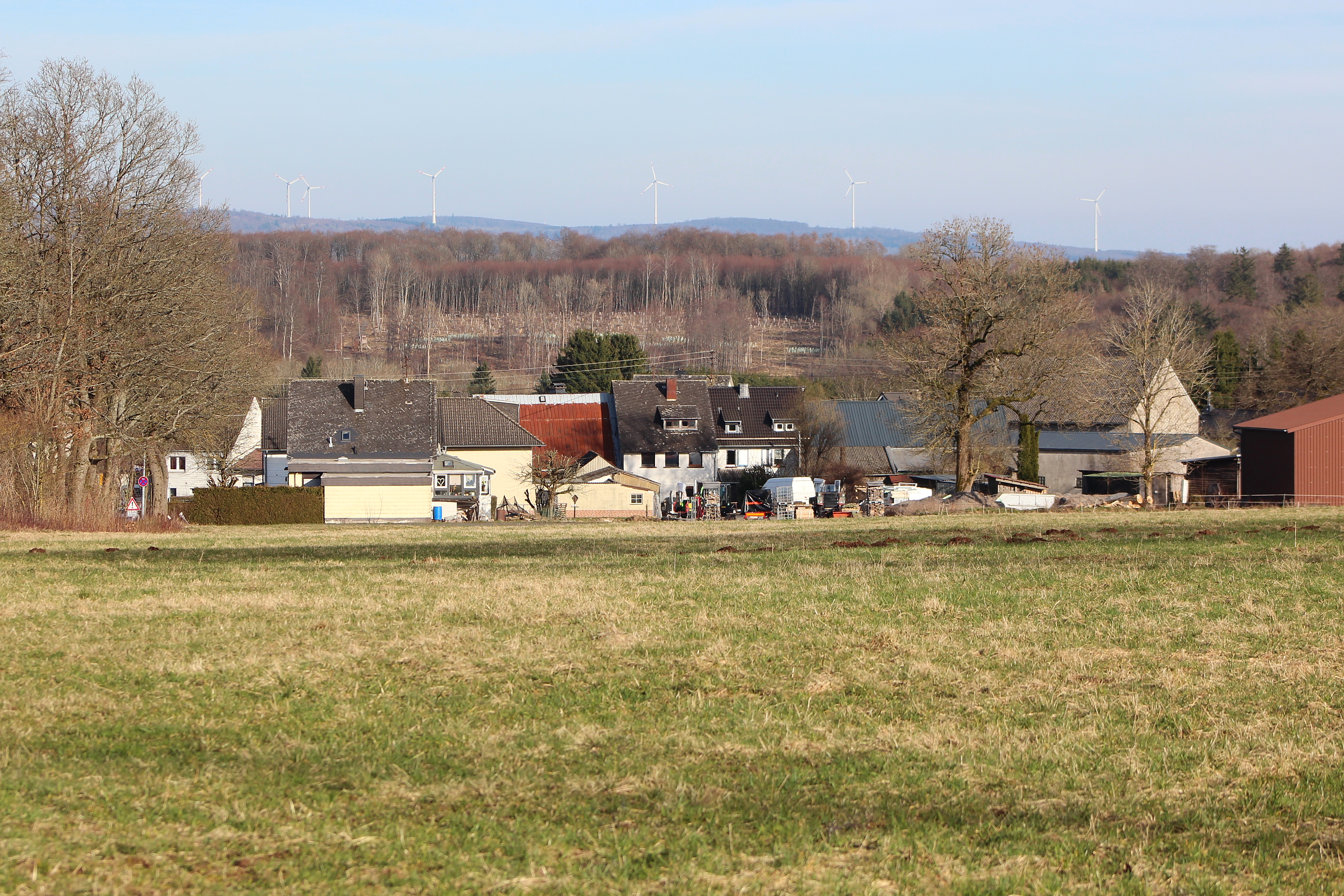

- Coat of arms

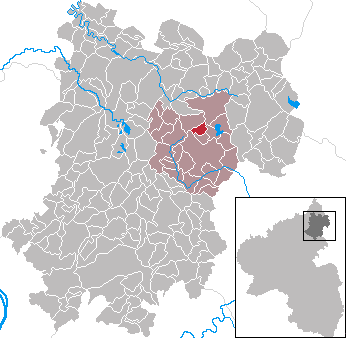
- Location of Halbs within Westerwaldkreis district
- Interactive map of Halbs
- Location within Germany Location within Rhineland-Palatinate
- Coordinates: 50°35′27″N 7°57′53″E
- Country: Germany
- State: Rhineland-Palatinate
- District: Westerwaldkreis
- Municipal assoc.: Westerburg

Government
  - Mayor (2019–24): Rudi Keßler

Area
  - Total: 2.12 km^{2} (0.82 sq mi)
- Elevation: 450 m (1,480 ft)

Population (2025-12-31)
  - Total: 350
  - Density: 170/km^{2} (430/sq mi)
- Time zone: UTC+01:00 (CET)
  - Summer (DST): UTC+02:00 (CEST)
- Postal codes: 56457
- Dialling codes: 02663
- Vehicle registration: WW
- Website: www.westerburger-land.de

Halbs is an Ortsgemeinde – a community belonging to a Verbandsgemeinde – in the Westerwaldkreis in Rhineland-Palatinate, Germany.

== Geography ==
=== Location ===
Halbs lies 3 km north of Westerburg on a bank in the middle of a wooded and field area. Since 1972 it has belonged to what was then the newly founded Verbandsgemeinde of Westerburg, a kind of collective municipality.

=== Neighbouring communities ===
Bordering on Halbs are Ailertchen, Hergenroth and Stahlhofen am Wiesensee.

== Politics ==
The municipal council is made up of 9 council members, including the extraofficial mayor (Bürgermeister), who were elected in a majority vote in a municipal election on 7 June 2009.

== Economy and infrastructure ==
Halbs access to the public transport is through the local bus lines 464, 477, 480 and 965.

Halbs is located in the fare zone number 440 of the transport association Verkehrsverbund Rhein-Mosel (VRM).

North of the community runs Bundesstraße 255, leading from Montabaur to Herborn. The nearest Autobahn interchange is Diez on the A 3 (Cologne–Frankfurt).

Halbs was connected to the Cross Westerwald Railway (Montabaur - Wallmerod - Westerburg - Rennerod - Herborn), but nowadays this line between Montabaur and Wallmerod is only in service for fright trains and from Fehl-Ritzhausen to Rennerod station touristic Railbike tours take place, organized by the interest group IG Westerwald-Querbahn e. V. (IWQ).

Today the nearest accessibility to train service is Westerburg station at the Limburg-Altenkirchen railway (RB90). The nearest InterCityExpress stop is the railway station at Montabaur on the Cologne-Frankfurt high-speed rail line.
