= Kaden =

- Municipality
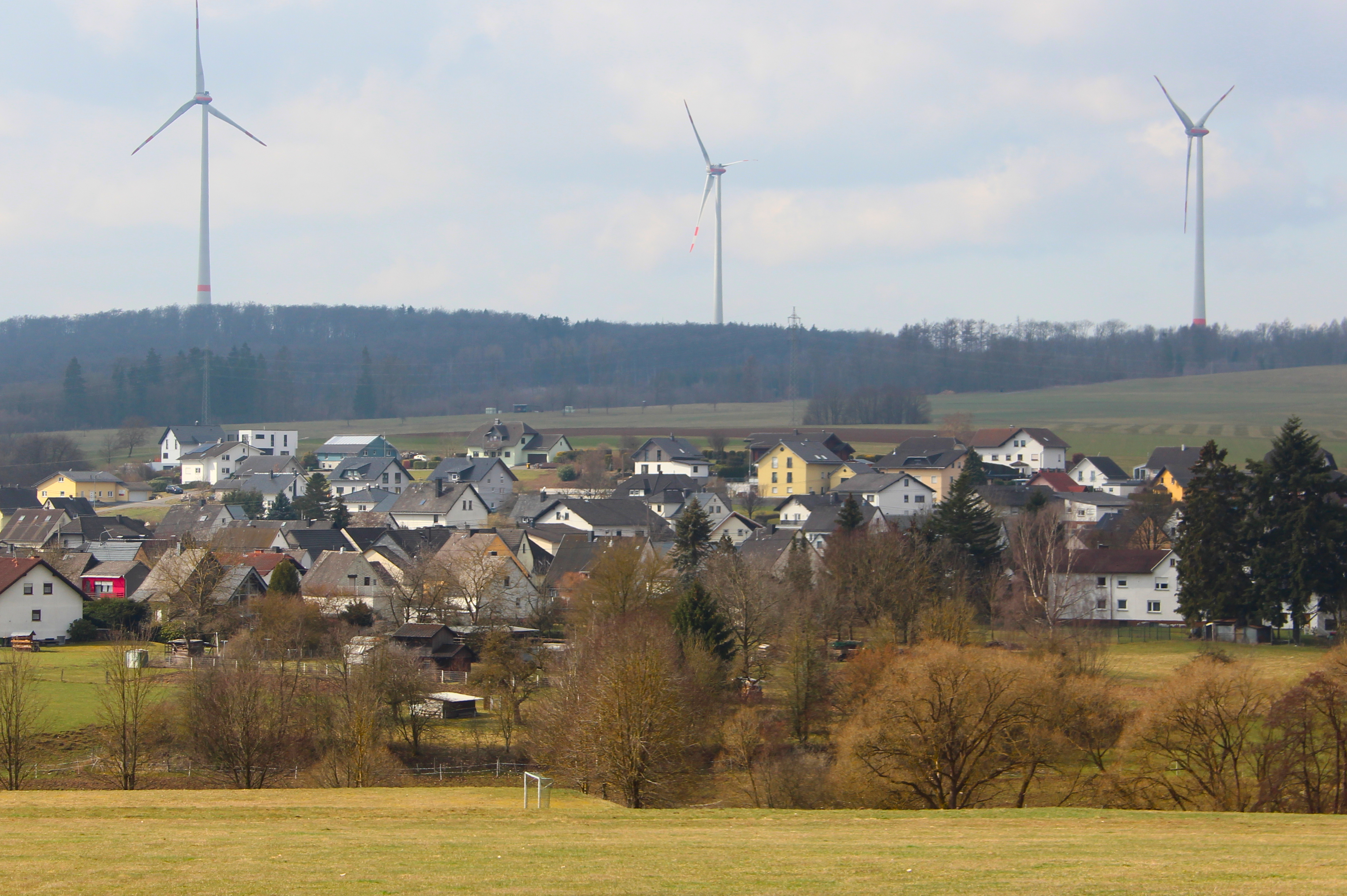

- Coat of arms

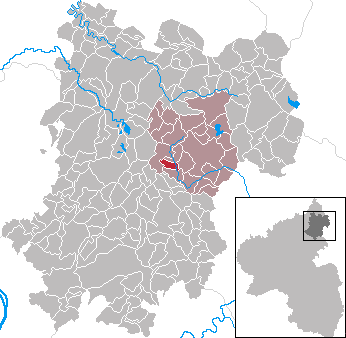
- Location of Kaden within Westerwaldkreis district
- Interactive map of Kaden
- Location within Germany Location within Rhineland-Palatinate
- Coordinates: 50°32′53″N 07°54′54″E
- Country: Germany
- State: Rhineland-Palatinate
- District: Westerwaldkreis
- Municipal assoc.: Westerburg

Government
  - Mayor (2019–24): Ute Chamski-Mohr

Area
  - Total: 2.25 km^{2} (0.87 sq mi)
- Elevation: 375 m (1,230 ft)

Population (2025-12-31)
  - Total: 569
  - Density: 253/km^{2} (655/sq mi)
- Time zone: UTC+01:00 (CET)
  - Summer (DST): UTC+02:00 (CEST)
- Postal codes: 56459
- Dialling codes: 02663
- Vehicle registration: WW
- Website: www.kaden-ww.de

Kaden is an Ortsgemeinde – a community belonging to a Verbandsgemeinde – in the Westerwaldkreis in Rhineland-Palatinate, Germany.

== Geography ==
The community lies midway between the cities of Cologne and Frankfurt am Main in the southwest of the Verbandsgemeinde of Westerburg – a kind of collective municipality – at an elevation of roughly 370 m above sea level. Neighbouring communities are Härtlingen, Kölbingen and Brandscheid.

== History ==
Originally, Kaden consisted of several places and lay under the rule of the House of Nassau-Diez in the old Niederlahngau. Among the community's constituent centres was Meiningen, already known to history through a documentary mention in 1295, from whose name came the field names Unter Meiningen and Meininger Grub, still used today. Meiningen lay on the spot of today's constituent community of Grube Anna.

The name “Elben” or “uff der Elben”, today the Kaden Ortsteil lying on the Elbbach, was first mentioned in 1417. Kaden, first mentioned in 1559 as zur Keuthen, grew together from several farms. Field names are now all that remains of the former centres of Beilstein and Beuningen.

Kaden belonged from 1564 to 1802 to the Electorate of Trier. In local speech even today, Kaden is described as being in the Trierschland. In 1802, Caden, as it was then spelt, passed to the Duchy of Nassau. When this was dissolved in the wake of the Austro-Prussian War, the Westerwald became part of Prussia.

By community council's decision on 19 May 1936, the placename spelling Caden was changed to Kaden. The change went into force on 1 February 1937. In 1972 came the amalgamation of Kaden into the Verbandsgemeinde of Westerburg in the Westerwaldkreis. Like all other Westerwald villages, Kaden has undergone a shift over the last 50 years from a farming village to an almost purely residential community.

=== Religion ===
Historically, the majority of the roughly 630 inhabitants have professed the Catholic faith.

== Public institutions ==
=== Education ===
Kaden is home to a two-stream elementary school with about 200 pupils. The school has a gymnasium with integrated village community house, both used by both pupils and clubs for sporting and cultural events. Abutting the schoolground is a sporting ground with a running track used by both the pupils and the village children.

The kindergarten is found right nearby. The Hauptschule, the Realschule, the Gymnasium (school), the vocational school and the professional school are in the neighbouring town of Westerburg, roughly 5 km away.

== Economy and infrastructure ==
Through the buslines of the Rhein-Main-Verkehrsverbund, the Westerburg-Limburg-Frankfurt and Westerburg-Altenkirchen-Cologne railway lines and the InterCityExpress stop in Montabaur, Kaden is linked to the long-distance transport network.

== Coat of arms ==
Coat of arms

With the certificate issued on 13 October 1992, the community of Kaden is now entitled to bear its own arms. The coat of arms was created from heraldist Manfred Limbach's design and is based in history.

The community consisted of several centres in the Early Middle Ages and the Nassau-Diez family was for the most part the lordly rulers.

In Elben (1417 Uff der Elben), once a lordly village along the Elbbach, the Nüssel von Möllingen family was favoured with a Westerburg fief about 1450. In the coat of arms, the three bends with three golden orbs recall both noble families. Kaden (1559 zu Keuthen) consisted of several farms. at least one of which belonged to the von Brambach family. Their arms, the red bend sinister in the community's coat of arms stands for Kaden, Elben and the von Brambach family.

In the constituent community of Grube Anna, there was brown coal pit mining until 1924. The mining charges in the community's coat of arms, inverted and per saltire in silver a red hammer and sledge, stand for Grube Anna. The three constituent communities are also symbolized by the three bends and three golden orbs.

The Elbbach, which flows through the municipal area from north to south, on which the community is built and which is Elben's namesake, is shown in the arms as wavy bendlets inside the bend sinister.

The tinctures red and silver witness Kaden's allegiance to the Electorate of Trier from 1564 to 1802. Thereafter, Kaden passed to the Duchy of Nassau and as of 1866, Prussia as part of the province of Hesse-Nassau. This is shown in the arms by the Nassau tinctures of blue and gold.

The tight connection of the three Triertschlandgemeinden, Kaden and its neighbours Härtlingen and Kölbingen, within the parish of Kölbingen-Möllingen is also expressed in the three communities’ arms, all of which contain the charges of the lesser noble families who once held sway here along the Elbbach.

== Clubs ==
- Accordion club: Elbacher Musikanten
- Volunteer fire brigade
- Men's singing club
- Shooting club
- Elbbacher Musikanten
- Football club
- Dog sport club
- Angling club
- Gymnastic group
- Skat-Sport-Verein
- Karnevalverein
