= Girkenroth =

- Municipality
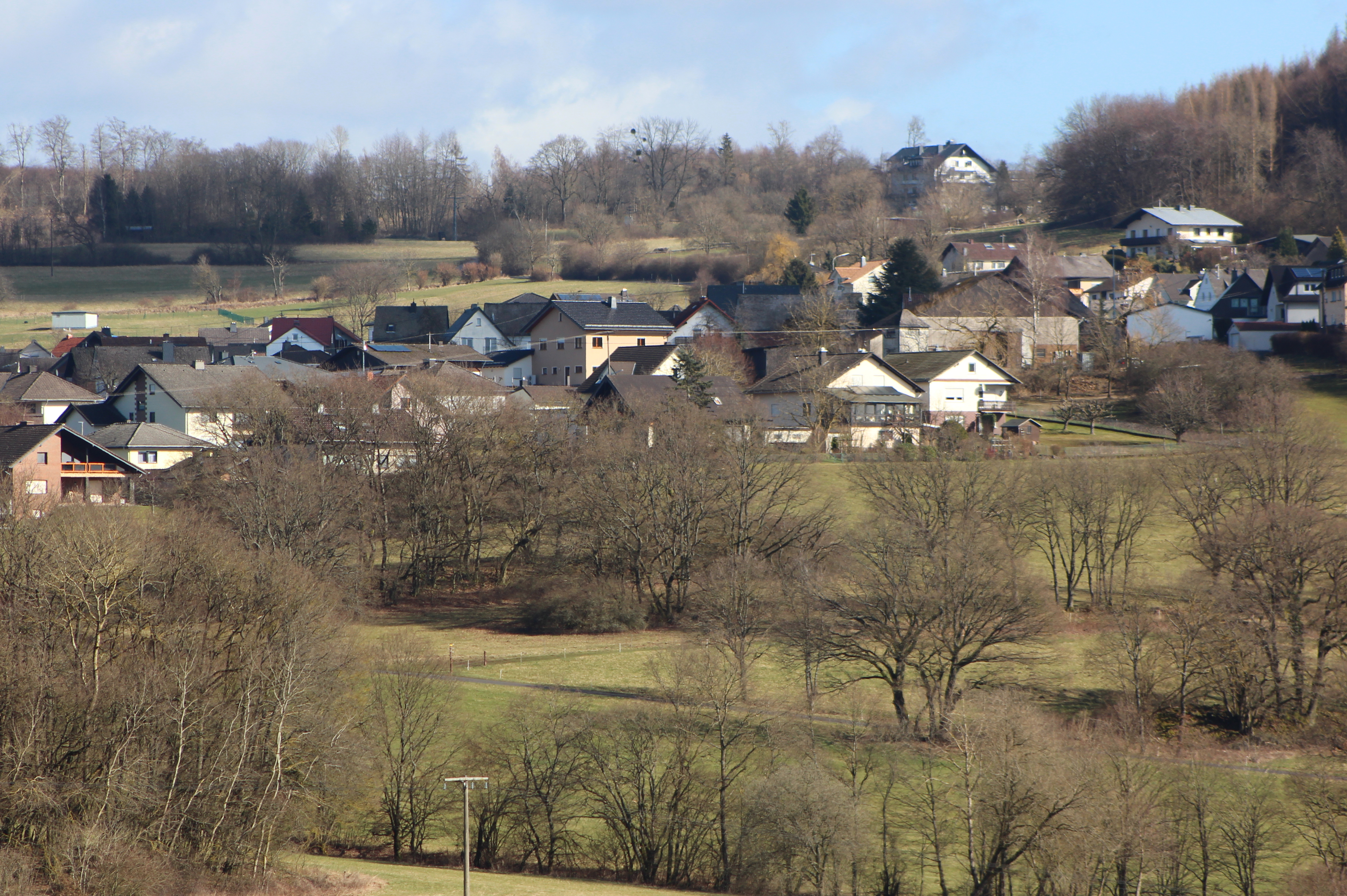

- Coat of arms

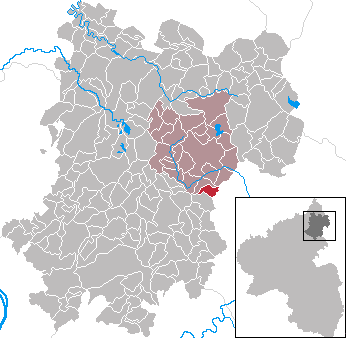
- Location of Girkenroth within Westerwaldkreis district
- Interactive map of Girkenroth
- Location within Germany Location within Rhineland-Palatinate
- Coordinates: 50°31′15″N 7°58′19″E
- Country: Germany
- State: Rhineland-Palatinate
- District: Westerwaldkreis
- Municipal assoc.: Westerburg

Government
  - Mayor (2019–24): Claudia Schmidt

Area
  - Total: 2.77 km^{2} (1.07 sq mi)
- Elevation: 400 m (1,300 ft)

Population (2025-12-31)
  - Total: 619
  - Density: 223/km^{2} (579/sq mi)
- Time zone: UTC+01:00 (CET)
  - Summer (DST): UTC+02:00 (CEST)
- Postal codes: 56459
- Dialling codes: 06435
- Vehicle registration: WW
- Website: www.girkenroth.de

Girkenroth is an Ortsgemeinde – a municipality belonging to a Verbandsgemeinde – in the Westerwaldkreis in Rhineland-Palatinate, Germany.

== Geography ==
Girkenroth lies 7 km south of Westerburg at the foot of the Watzenhahn woodland. Since 1972 it has belonged to what was then the newly founded Verbandsgemeinde of Westerburg, a kind of collective municipality.

== History ==
In 1516, Girkenroth had its first documentary mention as Gergerode.

== Politics ==
The council is made up of 13 council members, including the extraofficial mayor (Bürgermeister), who were elected in a majority vote in a municipal election on 13 June 2004.

=== Coat of arms ===
The three blue bends on a golden background come from the arms formerly borne by the lesser noble family of Ottenstein, whose seat, albeit already forsaken in the 14th century, lay within Girkenroth's current limits. A field's name still recalls this seat. In the village itself the von Ottensteins had property in the Late Middle Ages and early modern times.

The background tincture green refers to the woodlands growing around the municipality and the pasture farming that is important here to this day (there was a communal livestock herd until the 1960s). Agriculture, as the most important basis for food production into the 20th century, is also symbolized by the golden grain ear. The three basalt columns on a silver background are said to stand for the Watzenhahn basalt massif at whose foot Girkenroth lies. In this century, local quarrying has become an important source of income for the inhabitants.

== Economy and infrastructure ==
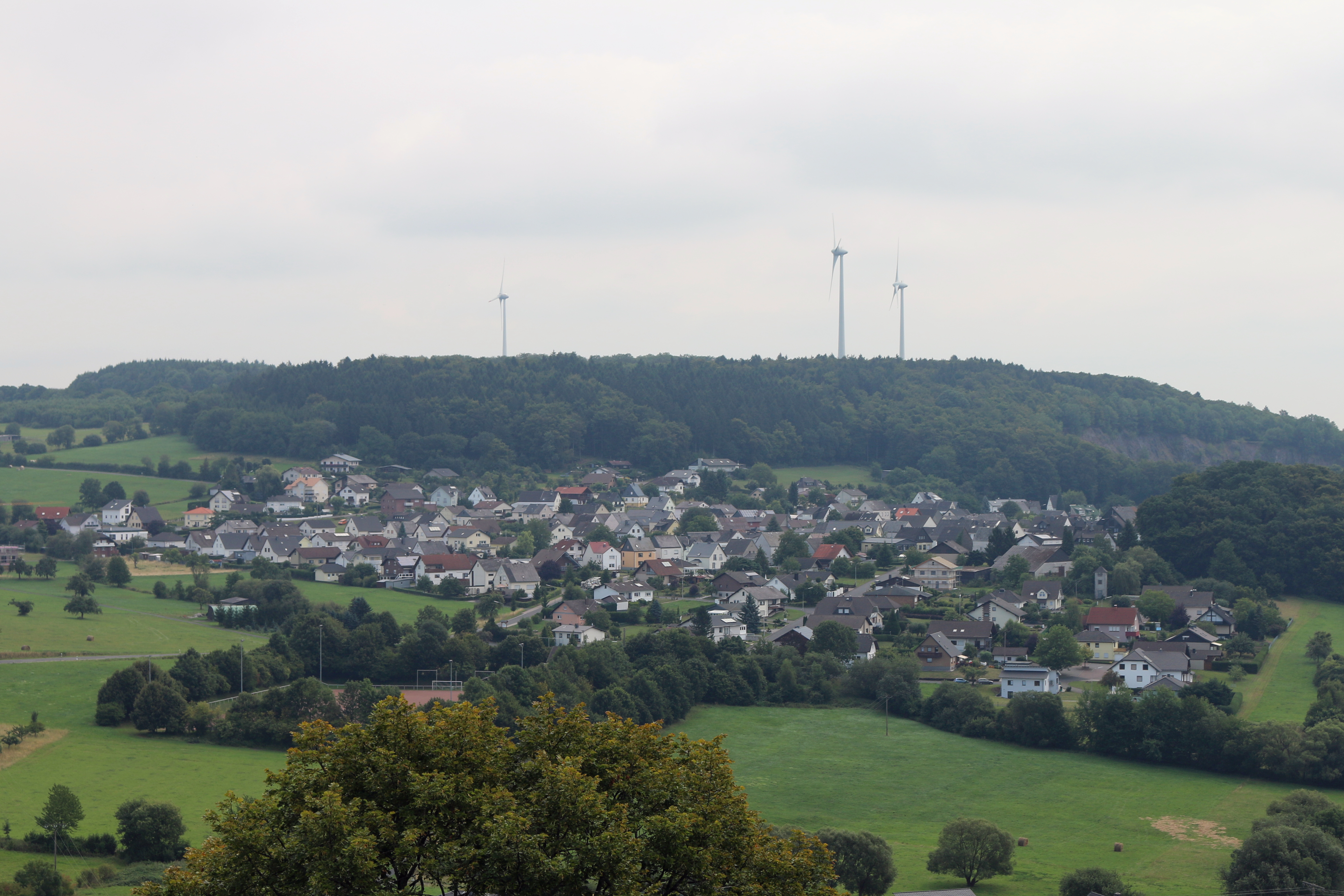
Girkenroth (front) and three wind turbines of the Girkenroth wind park (back)

=== Traffic ===
Girkenroth is located in the area of the transport association Verkehrsverbund Rhein-Mosel (VRM), in the zone 429 and connected to the local bus line 481, which goes from Montabaur via Wallmerod and Girkenroth to Westerburg station.

South of the municipality runs Bundesstraße 8 leading from Limburg an der Lahn to Siegburg. The nearest Autobahn interchange is Diez on the A 3 (Cologne–Frankfurt). The nearest train station is located in Willmenrod at the Limburg-Altenkirchen railway, the nearest InterCityExpress stop is the railway station at Montabaur on the Cologne-Frankfurt high-speed rail line.

=== Wind park ===
On the area of Girkenroth a wind park has been constructed to produce green electricity.
