= Höhn =

- Municipality
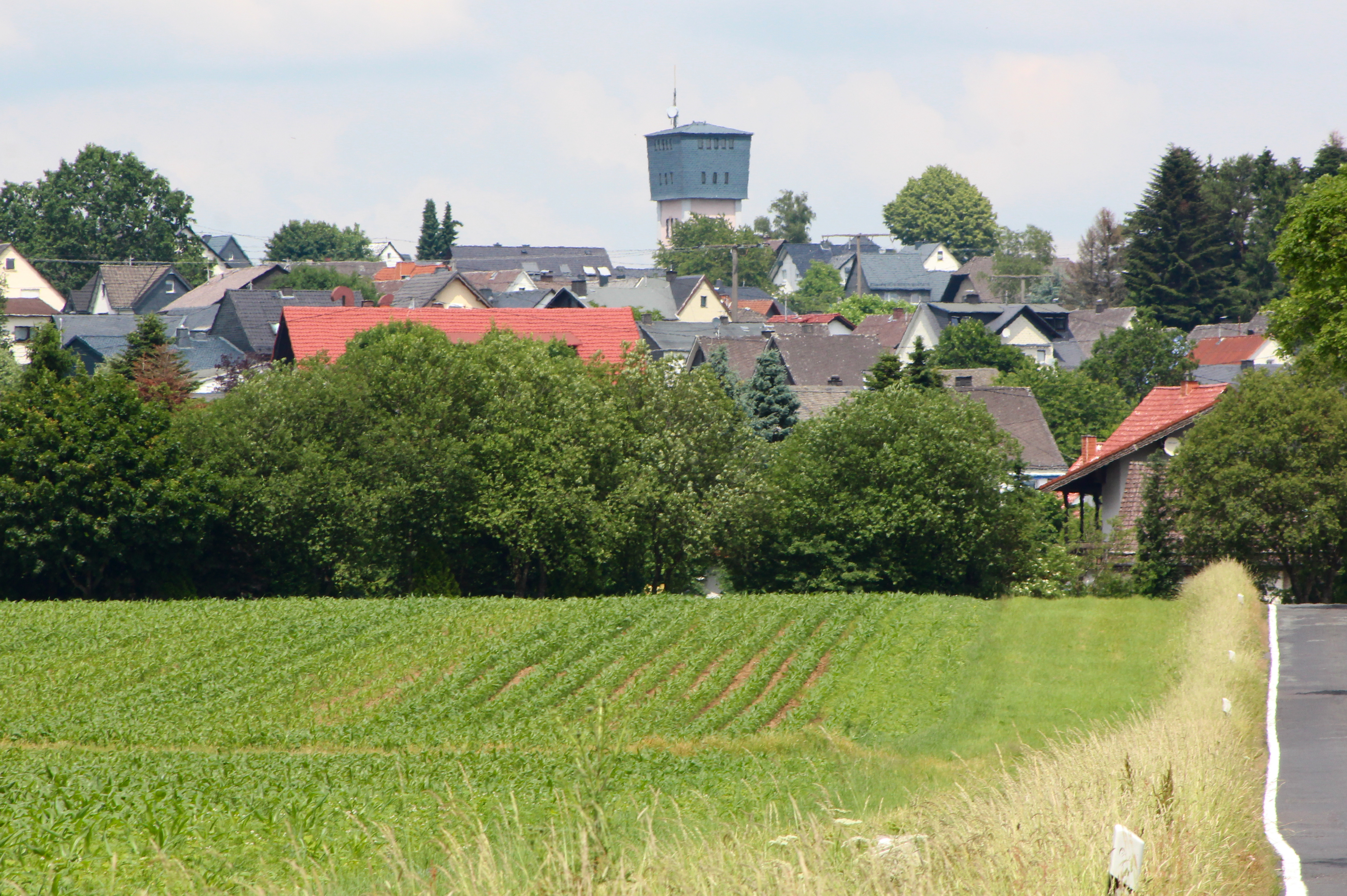

- Coat of arms

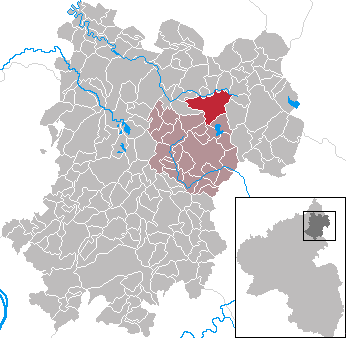
- Location of Höhn within Westerwaldkreis district
- Interactive map of Höhn
- Location within Germany Location within Rhineland-Palatinate
- Coordinates: 50°37′11″N 7°59′17″E
- Country: Germany
- State: Rhineland-Palatinate
- District: Westerwaldkreis
- Municipal assoc.: Westerburg
- Subdivisions: 4

Government
  - Mayor (2019–24): Karin Mohr

Area
  - Total: 13.68 km^{2} (5.28 sq mi)
- Elevation: 508 m (1,667 ft)

Population (2025-12-31)
  - Total: 3,160
  - Density: 231/km^{2} (598/sq mi)
- Time zone: UTC+01:00 (CET)
  - Summer (DST): UTC+02:00 (CEST)
- Postal codes: 56462
- Dialling codes: 02661
- Vehicle registration: WW
- Website: www.gemeinde-hoehn.de

Höhn (German pronunciation: [høːn]) is an Ortsgemeinde – a community belonging to a Verbandsgemeinde – in the Westerwaldkreis in Rhineland-Palatinate, Germany.

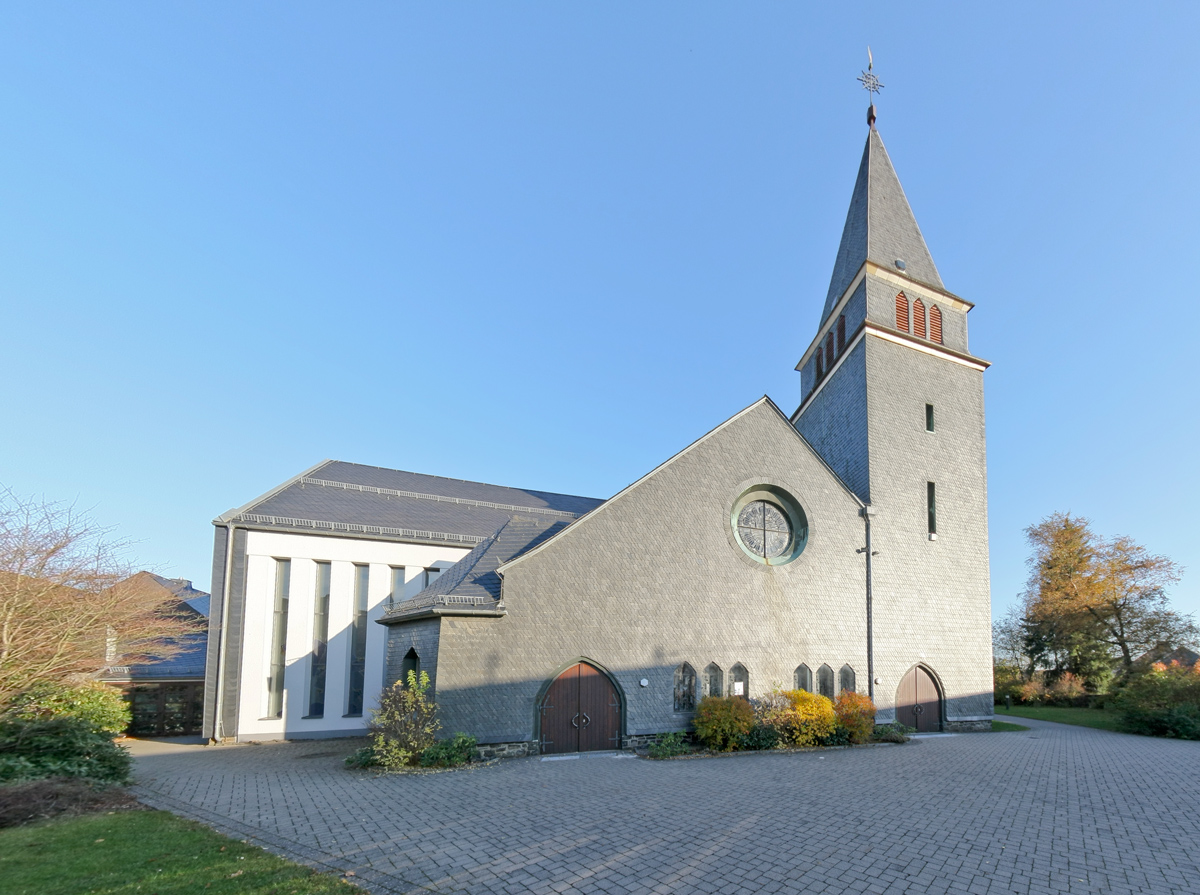
Catholic parish church Mariä Heimsuchung

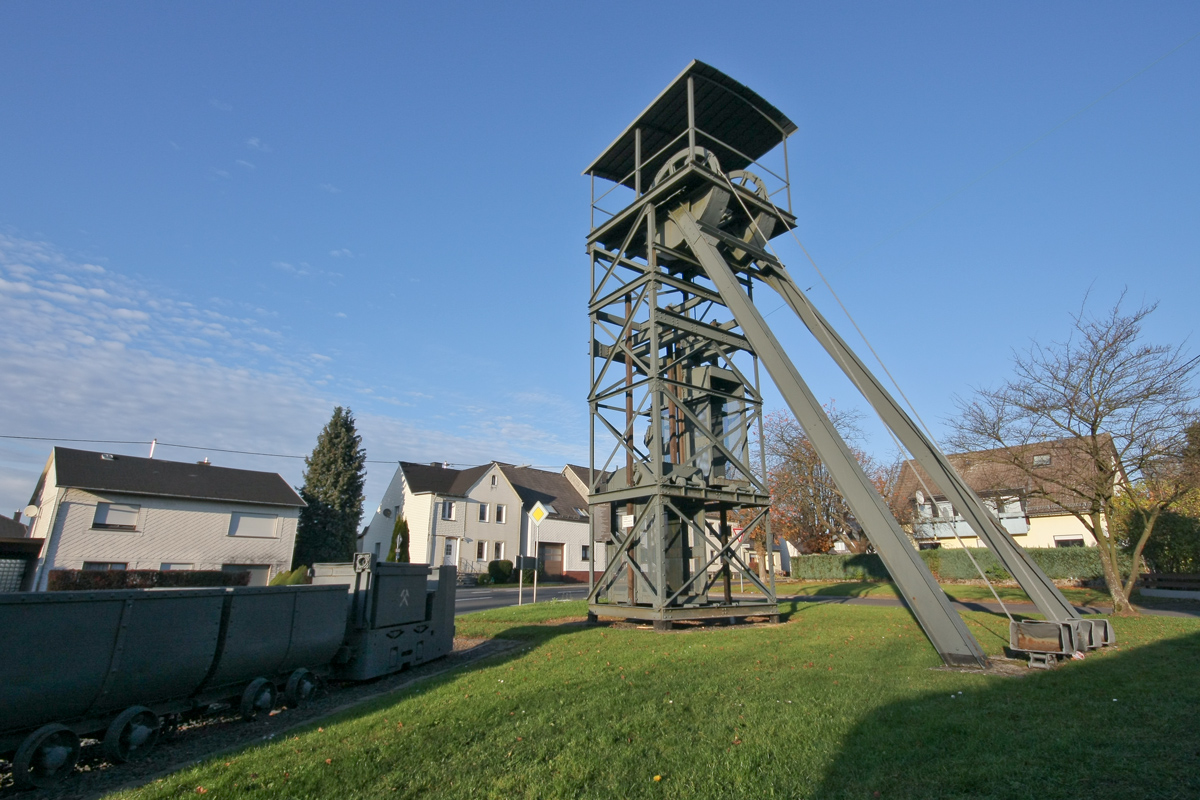
The industrial memorial at the marketplace

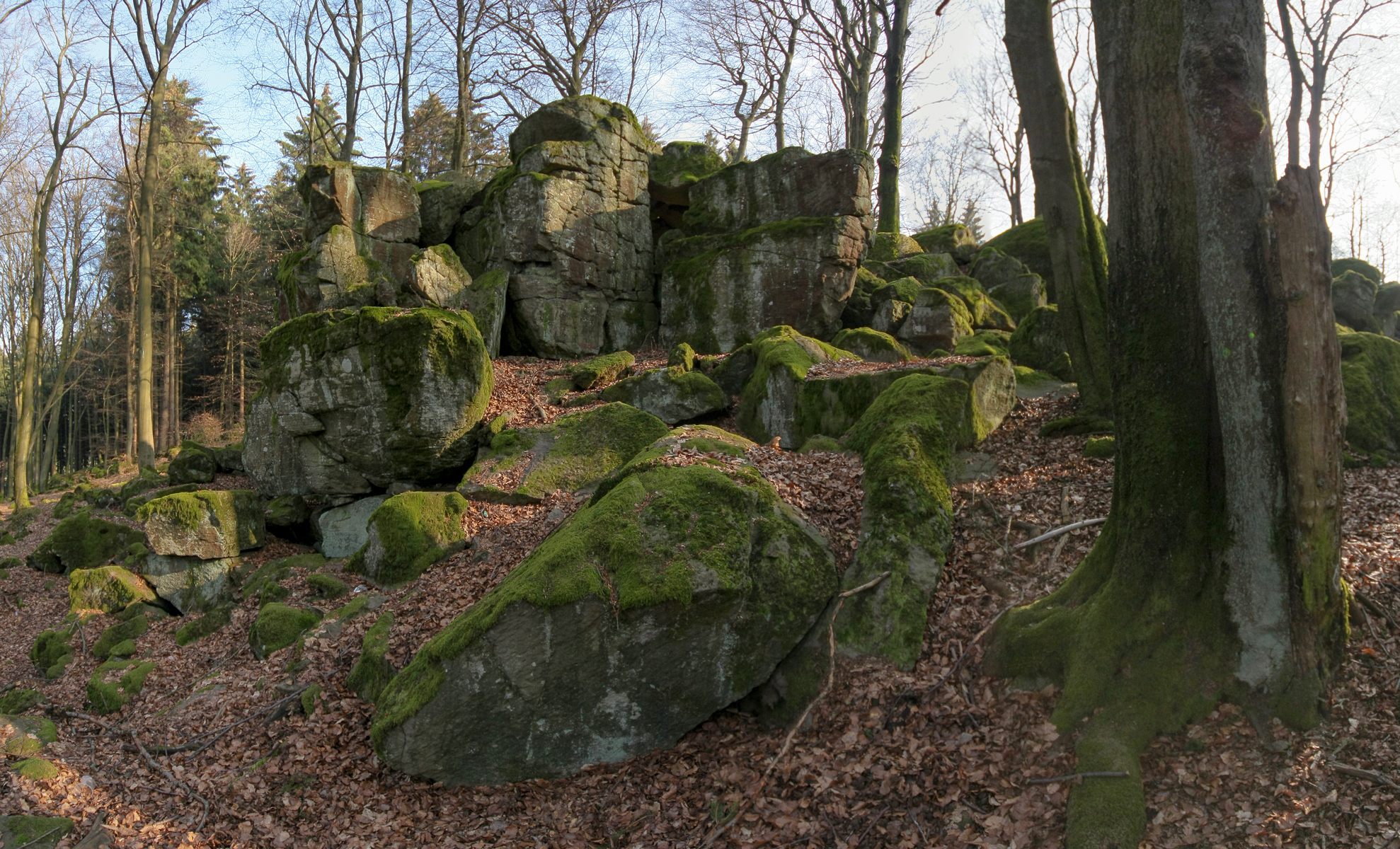
Basalt formations of the natural monument Hochstein – with 525 m the highest elevation of the Westerburger Land

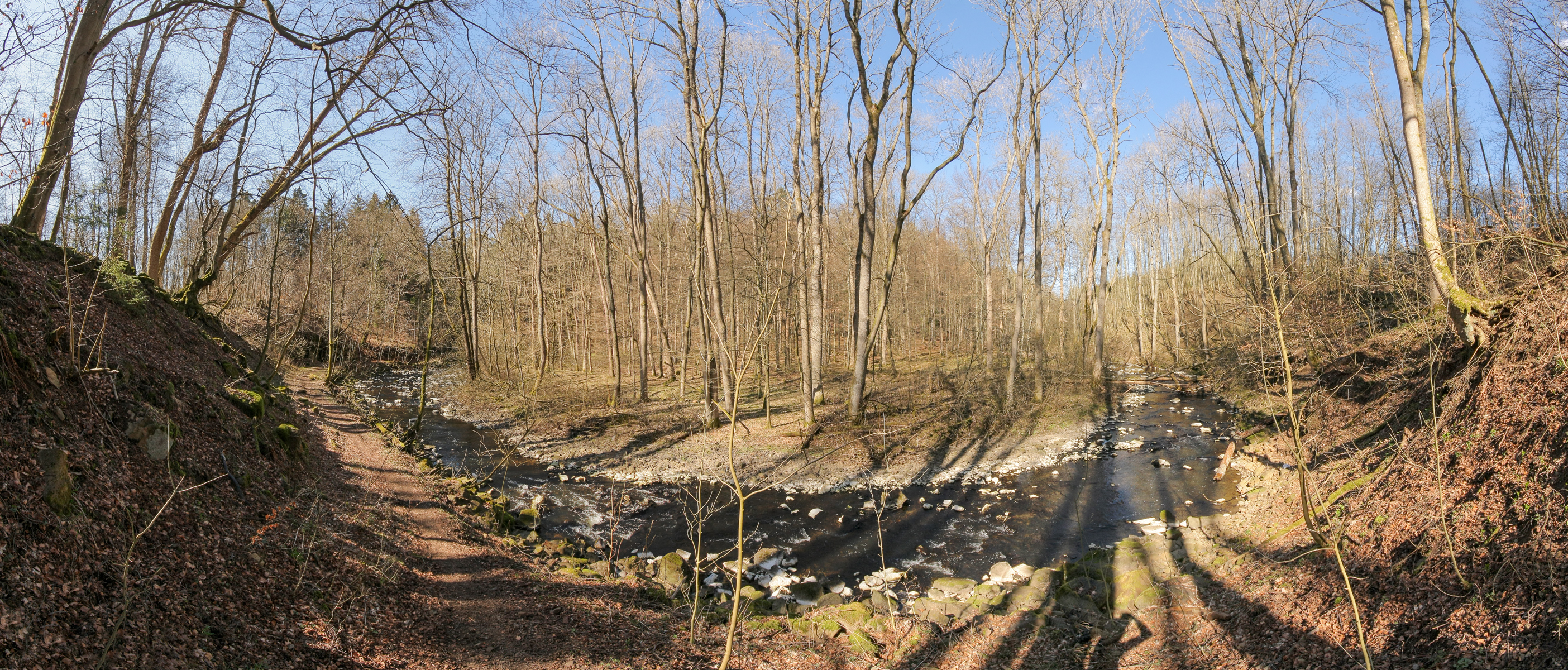
The valley of the Nister north of Höhn

== Geography ==
=== Location ===
With roughly 3,200 inhabitants, Höhn is the biggest Ortsgemeinde in the Verbandsgemeinde of Westerburg – a kind of collective municipality – in the Westerwald.

=== Constituent communities ===
Since 1969, Höhn has consisted of the Ortsteile of Höhn-Urdorf, Oellingen, Schönberg and Neuhochstein. The Ortsteile Höhn-Urdorf, Oellingen and Schönberg have over the last 50 years grown into one another, but in each one's old core, the signs of the structure of the original “clump” villages can be seen. Höhn-Urdorf – “Urdorf” means “original village” – is the community's main centre.

== History ==
In 930, Höhn had its first documentary mention as Hana.

=== Religion ===
In Höhn-Urdorf stands the great Catholic parish church Mariä Heimsuchung, which forms the centre of the old village core, as well as an Evangelical church on Bahnhofstraße. In Schönberg is found the Catholic parish church St. Josef.

== Climate ==
Höhn has an oceanic climate (Cfb in the Köppen climate classification).

Climate data for Höhn (1991–2020 normals, extremes 1969–present)
Month	Jan	Feb	Mar	Apr	May	Jun	Jul	Aug	Sep	Oct	Nov	Dec	Year
Record high °C (°F)	13.3 (55.9)	15.3 (59.5)	20.5 (68.9)	27.4 (81.3)	32.9 (91.2)	33.4 (92.1)	35.3 (95.5)	36.1 (97.0)	29.9 (85.8)	22.8 (73.0)	17.4 (63.3)	13.8 (56.8)	36.1 (97.0)
Mean daily maximum °C (°F)	3.8 (38.8)	4.6 (40.3)	7.6 (45.7)	12.6 (54.7)	16.9 (62.4)	19.6 (67.3)	22.5 (72.5)	22.5 (72.5)	18.5 (65.3)	13.1 (55.6)	7.6 (45.7)	4.5 (40.1)	12.8 (55.0)
Daily mean °C (°F)	1.7 (35.1)	1.9 (35.4)	4.3 (39.7)	8.0 (46.4)	12.0 (53.6)	15.2 (59.4)	17.5 (63.5)	17.2 (63.0)	13.7 (56.7)	9.5 (49.1)	5.3 (41.5)	2.7 (36.9)	8.9 (48.0)
Mean daily minimum °C (°F)	−0.9 (30.4)	−1.1 (30.0)	0.4 (32.7)	3.4 (38.1)	6.9 (44.4)	10.1 (50.2)	12.8 (55.0)	12.6 (54.7)	9.7 (49.5)	5.7 (42.3)	2.2 (36.0)	−0.3 (31.5)	5.1 (41.2)
Record low °C (°F)	−20.9 (−5.6)	−17.3 (0.9)	−17.0 (1.4)	−7.3 (18.9)	−2.5 (27.5)	2.0 (35.6)	4.8 (40.6)	3.6 (38.5)	0.2 (32.4)	−7.8 (18.0)	−12.2 (10.0)	−22.5 (−8.5)	−22.5 (−8.5)
Average precipitation mm (inches)	68.9 (2.71)	55.2 (2.17)	53.4 (2.10)	38.7 (1.52)	56.3 (2.22)	71.0 (2.80)	88.8 (3.50)	87.6 (3.45)	77.8 (3.06)	75.9 (2.99)	65.6 (2.58)	73.1 (2.88)	830.5 (32.70)
Average precipitation days (≥ 1.0 mm)	19.0	17.6	16.3	12.9	13.8	15.3	16.1	15.9	16.4	17.8	18.9	19.4	200.8
Average snowy days (≥ 1.0 cm)	6.4	6.6	3.3	0.2	0	0	0	0	0	0	0.9	5.0	22.4
Average relative humidity (%)	87.3	84.4	80.2	73.7	71.4	72.6	73.3	75.4	79.4	83.0	87.5	88.7	79.7
Mean monthly sunshine hours	44.2	61.7	121.7	182.1	242.4	227.4	240.3	223.0	155.9	108.0	54.4	37.2	1,672.4
Source 1: World Meteorological Organization
Source 2: DWD (extremes)

== Politics ==
=== Community council ===
The council is made up of 17 council members, including the mayor (Bürgermeister), who were elected in a municipal election on 13 June 2004.

	SPD	CDU	FWG	Total
2004	4	10	6	16 seats

=== Mayor ===
The Mayor of Höhn is Karin Mohr.

== Culture and sightseeing ==
Particular attractions and sightseeing spots are the valley of the river Nister in the north, the natural monument “Hochstein” in Neuhochstein with its unusual basalt formations – and at 525 m also the highest spot in the Westerburger Land – the Catholic parish church Mariä Heimsuchung in Höhn, the parish church St. Josef in Schönberg – a basalt building from 1891, and painted to give its original appearance in 1992 – and the industrial memorial at the marketplace in Höhn.

Schönberg is home to the Westerwald's longest ski lift at 700 m. Hiking lovers can, among other things, reach the Wiesensee, an 80-ha lake with an 18-hole golf course on the shores, over well developed hiking trails.

Businesses such as bakeries, restaurants, butcher shops and grocer's shops, especially in the shopping park on the Bundesstraße, are abundant, as are the handicraft businesses in Höhn. Also available are two general practitioners, a dentist, a pharmacy, a filling station and several financial institutions.

=== Sport ===
There are two sports grounds – one near the school in Oellingen and one between Schönberg and Neuhochstein. Furthermore, a ski lift some 700 m long and a chalet are to be found in Schönberg.

In each of Oellingen, Schönberg and Neuhochstein is a village community house. Among other institutions are the mayor's office with sitting room, fire stations, youth centres, graveyards, playgrounds and other public greenspaces.

== Economy and infrastructure ==
Those inhabitants who work somewhere outside Höhn's many businesses mostly earn their livelihoods in the Westerburg-Bad Marienberg-Rennerod area.

=== Transport ===
Local bus line no. 477 goes from Rehe via Rennerod and Westerburg to Montabaur, further local bus lines are 464, 470, 483, 484 and 965.

The village is located in the area of the transport association Verkehrsverbund Rhein-Mosel (VRM), zone number 440.

Through Bundesstraße 255, Höhn is linked to Autobahnen A 3 (Cologne–Frankfurt) and A 45 (Dortmund–Aschaffenburg) as well as to the greater centres of Koblenz, Limburg an der Lahn and Herborn.

Höhn had a station at the Cross Westerwald Railway (Montabaur - Wallmerod - Westerburg - Rennerod - Herborn). The section of the Westerwaldquerbahn from Fehl-Ritzhausen to Rennerod sometimes is in use for touristic Draisine rides operated by the NGO IG Westerwald-Querbahn (IWQ) e. V., an extension to Höhn is planned.

=== Education ===
Höhn is home to a primary school and a Hauptschule, a special school, a kindergarten and one special kindergarten.

The schools are assigned a sport hall, an indoor swimming pool and a sporting ground.

Secondary schools are found in Westerburg, Rennerod and Bad Marienberg.

=== Energy production ===
Since 2016, a wind farm including three Wind turbines produces electricity in Höhn.
