= Langenhahn =

- Municipality
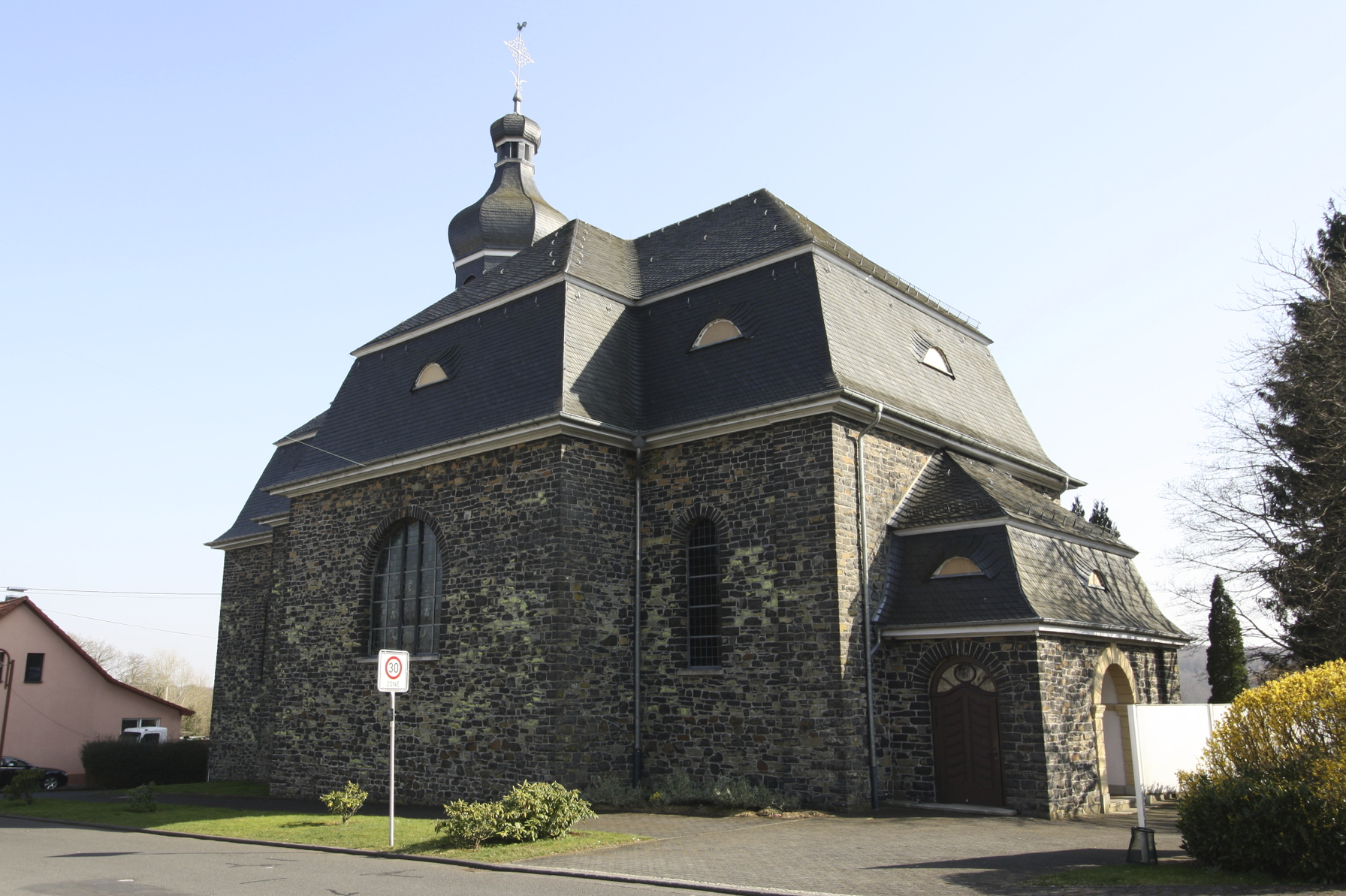

- Coat of arms

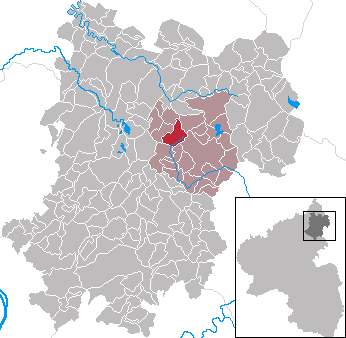
- Location of Langenhahn within Westerwaldkreis district
- Interactive map of Langenhahn
- Location within Germany Location within Rhineland-Palatinate
- Coordinates: 50°35′03″N 7°55′11″E
- Country: Germany
- State: Rhineland-Palatinate
- District: Westerwaldkreis
- Municipal assoc.: Westerburg
- Subdivisions: 4

Government
  - Mayor (2019–24): Frank Weingarten

Area
  - Total: 5.75 km^{2} (2.22 sq mi)
- Elevation: 450 m (1,480 ft)

Population (2025-12-31)
  - Total: 1,361
  - Density: 237/km^{2} (613/sq mi)
- Time zone: UTC+01:00 (CET)
  - Summer (DST): UTC+02:00 (CEST)
- Postal codes: 56459
- Dialling codes: 02663
- Vehicle registration: WW
- Website: www.westerburger-land.de

Langenhahn is an Ortsgemeinde – a community belonging to a Verbandsgemeinde – in the Westerwaldkreis in Rhineland-Palatinate, Germany.

== Geography ==
=== Location ===
Langenhahn lies in the Upper Westerwald and belongs to the Verbandsgemeinde of Westerburg, a kind of collective municipality. Through the community flows the Elbbach, which rises in the neighbouring community of Ailertchen and empties into the Lahn near Limburg an der Lahn. The municipal area lies at an elevation of 400 to 505 m above sea level.

=== Constituent communities ===
Langenhahn's Ortsteile are Langenhahn, Hinterkirchen, Hintermühlen and Hölzenhausen.

== History ==
In 1334, Langenhahn had its first documentary mention as Landenhain. In 1386, Hölzenhausen followed as Holtershusen, in 1417 Hinterkirchen as Hinterkirche and 1593 Hintermühlen as “uff der Hintermuell im Braeschied”. The merger into a single community came about in 1969.

=== Coat of arms ===
The two crossed arrows in the community's arms, which refer to Saint Sebastian’s martyrdom, symbolize Saint Sebastian's Chapel. The six-spoked waterwheel stands for milling, which has been of great importance in the municipal area's history. The four lozenges symbolize the four constituent communities and refer to the lordly aspect. The tincture red recalls the community's allegiance to Diez, and the tincture blue Nassau’s state colours.

== Economy and infrastructure ==
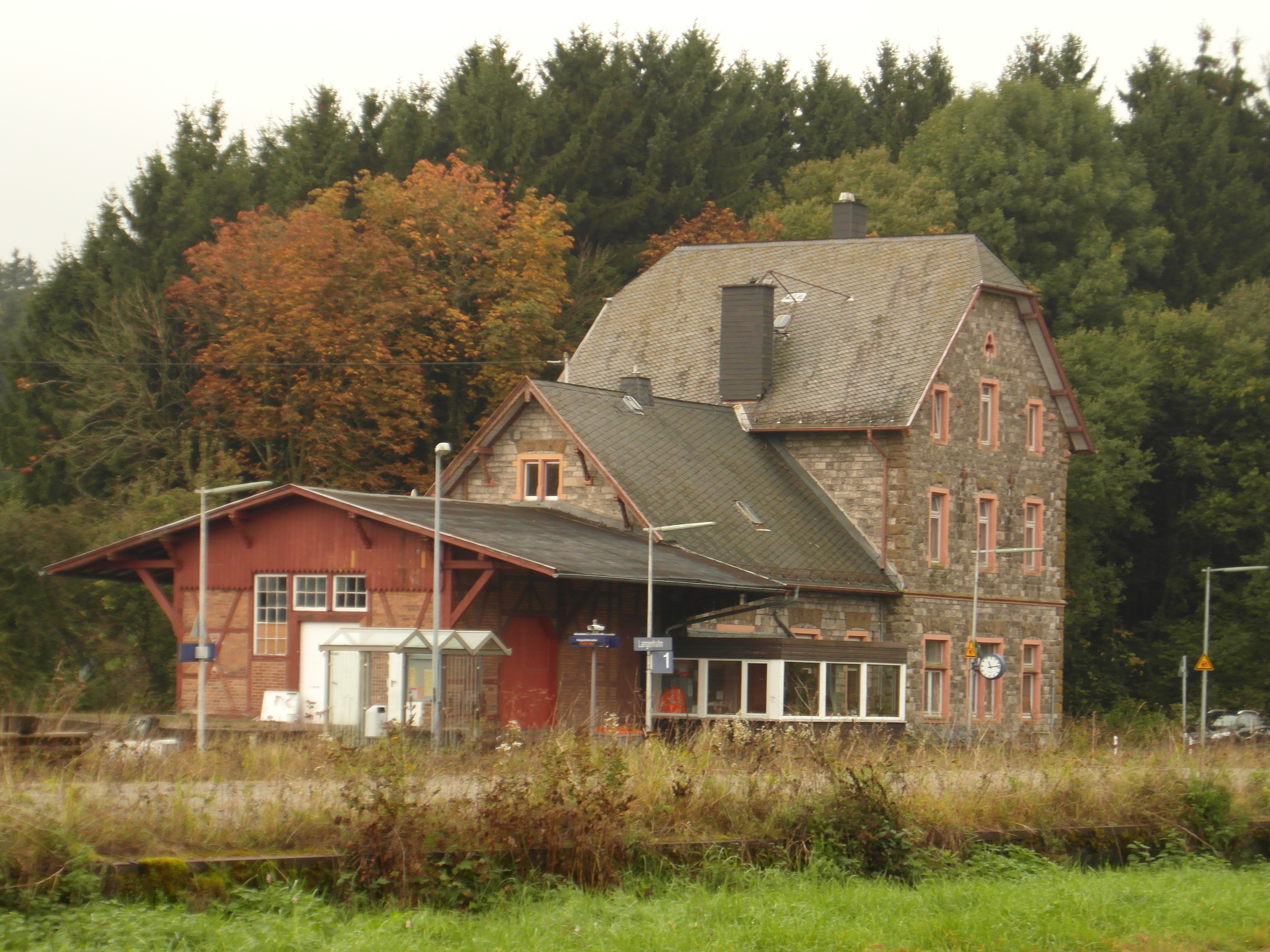
Langenhahn train station

Langenhahn has access to the public local bus transport through the lines 477, 959, 960 and 965.

Langenhahn lies on Bundesstraße 255 and is connected to the RB90, Westerwald-Sieg-Bahn (Limburg (Lahn) - Diez Ost - Westerburg - Hachenburg - Altenkirchen - Au (Sieg) - Wissen - Kirchen - Siegen Hbf), served by Hessische Landesbahn (HLB), section DreiLänderBahn, the lines highest point at 463 m above sea level lies in Langenhahn.

The village is located in the transport association Verkehrsverbund Rhein-Mosel (VRM), zones 431 and 439.

== Sport ==
The well known football club SG Langenhahn/Rothenbach is from Langenhahn. The team reached the Verbandsliga, today's Rheinlandliga, in the 1999/2000 season.

In Langenhahn there is a hard tennis court and a multi-purpose hall, which is used mainly for sporting activities.
