= Rotenhain =

- Municipality
- Coat of arms

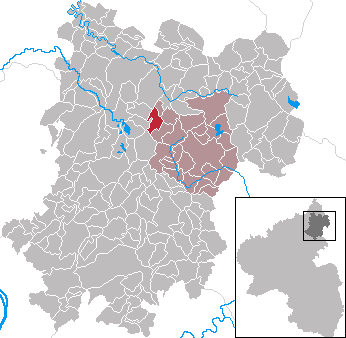
- Location of Rotenhain within Westerwaldkreis district
- Interactive map of Rotenhain
- Location within Germany Location within Rhineland-Palatinate
- Coordinates: 50°36′3″N 7°52′57″E
- Country: Germany
- State: Rhineland-Palatinate
- District: Westerwaldkreis
- Municipal assoc.: Westerburg

Government
  - Mayor (2019–24): Thomas Paul Ziomek

Area
  - Total: 4.10 km^{2} (1.58 sq mi)
- Elevation: 465 m (1,526 ft)

Population (2025-12-31)
  - Total: 484
  - Density: 118/km^{2} (306/sq mi)
- Time zone: UTC+01:00 (CET)
  - Summer (DST): UTC+02:00 (CEST)
- Postal codes: 56459
- Dialling codes: 02661
- Vehicle registration: WW
- Website: www.rotenhain.de

Rotenhain is an Ortsgemeinde – a community belonging to a Verbandsgemeinde – in the Westerwaldkreis in Rhineland-Palatinate, Germany. Since 1972 it has belonged to what was then the newly founded Verbandsgemeinde of Westerburg, a kind of collective municipality. Its seat is in the like-named town.

== Geography ==
Rotenhain lies 9 km southwest of Westerburg.

== Politics ==
The municipal council is made up of 13 council members, including the extraofficial mayor (Bürgermeister), who were elected in a majority vote in a municipal election on 13 June 2004.

== Economy and infrastructure ==
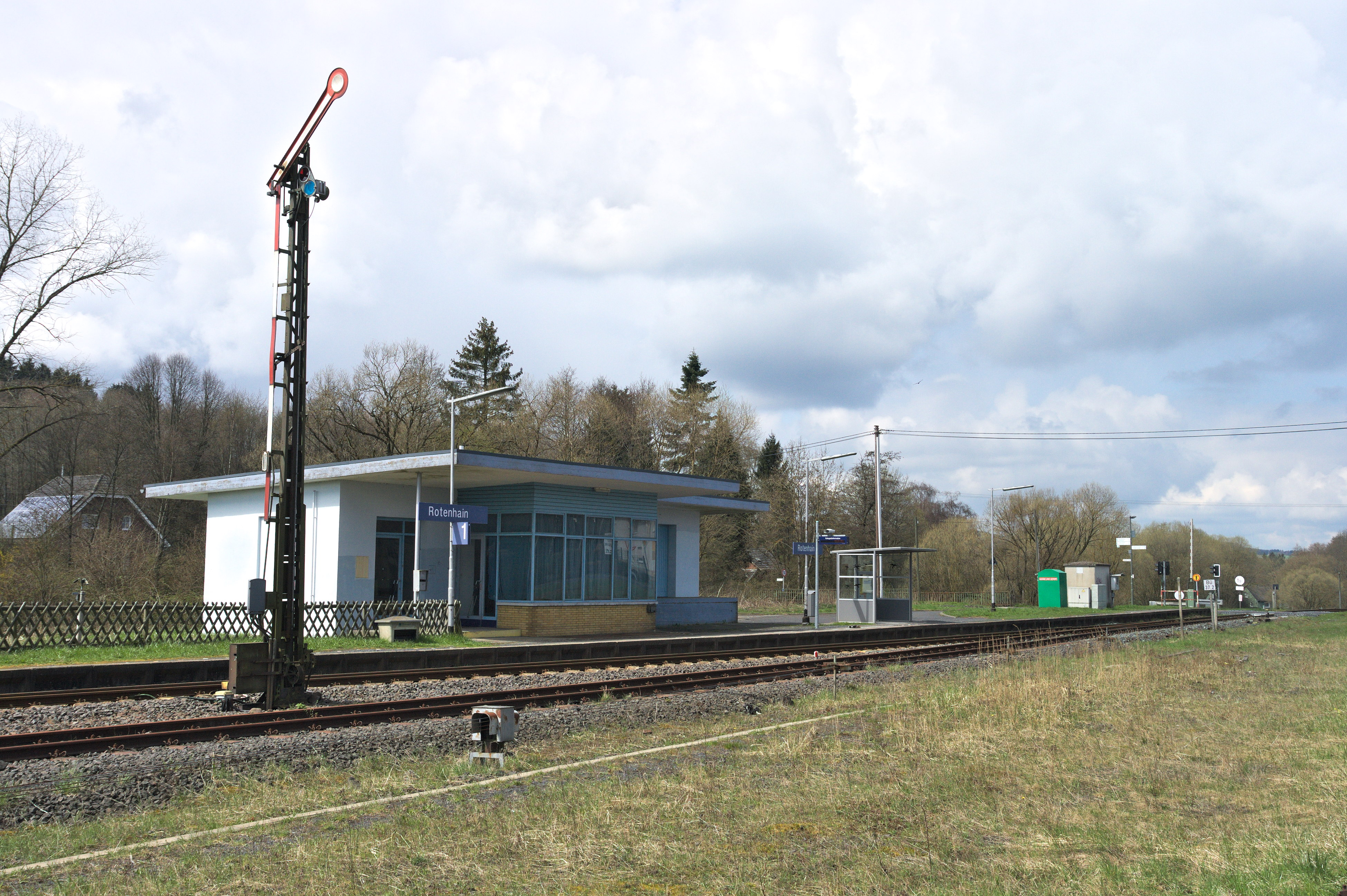
Rotenhain train station

Rotenhain is connected to the local bus lines 959 and 965. Southwest of the community runs Bundesstraße 255, leading from Montabaur to Herborn. The nearest Autobahn interchange is Montabaur on the A 3 (Cologne–Frankfurt). Rotenhain lies on the Westerwald-Sieg-Bahn (RB90) to Limburg and Siegen Hbf, serviced by Hessische Landesbahn, company section DreiLänderBahn.

From Limburg, Au and Siegen station the cities of Cologne, Koblenz, Frankfurt am Main and Wiesbaden may be reached directly. The nearest InterCityExpress stop is the railway station at Montabaur on the Cologne-Frankfurt high-speed rail line. Rotenhain is located in the area of the transport association Verkehrsverbund Rhein-Mosel (VRM), zone 439.
