= Rothenbach =

- Municipality
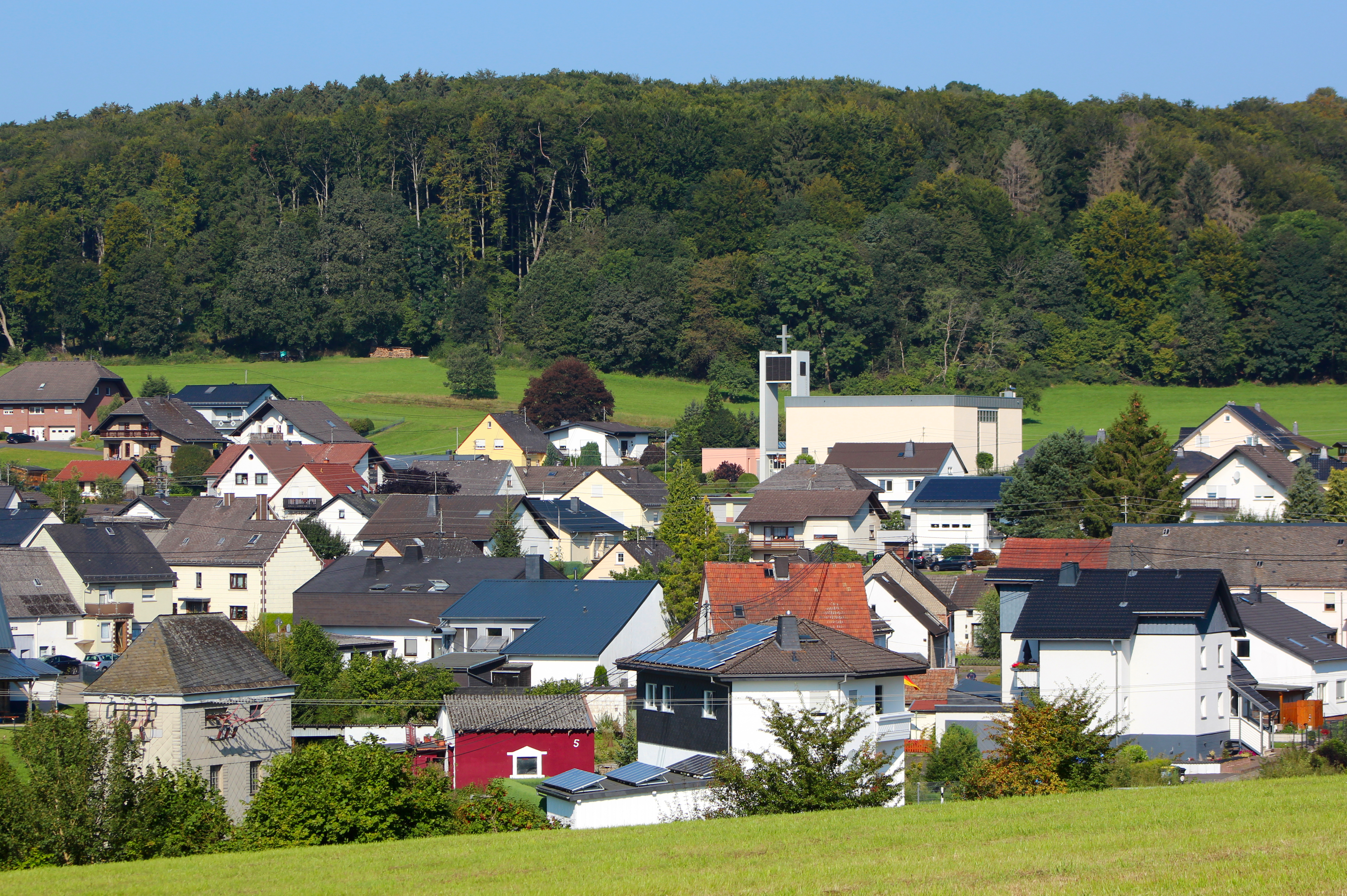

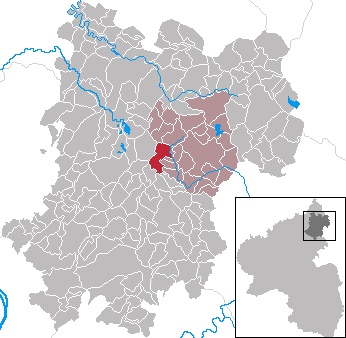
- Location of Rothenbach within Westerwaldkreis district
- Interactive map of Rothenbach
- Location within Germany Location within Rhineland-Palatinate
- Coordinates: 50°33′51″N 7°54′12″E
- Country: Germany
- State: Rhineland-Palatinate
- District: Westerwaldkreis
- Municipal assoc.: Westerburg
- Subdivisions: 2

Government
  - Mayor (2019–24): Holger Bäcker

Area
  - Total: 6.72 km^{2} (2.59 sq mi)
- Elevation: 465 m (1,526 ft)

Population (2025-12-31)
  - Total: 960
  - Density: 140/km^{2} (370/sq mi)
- Time zone: UTC+01:00 (CET)
  - Summer (DST): UTC+02:00 (CEST)
- Postal codes: 56459
- Dialling codes: 02663
- Vehicle registration: WW
- Website: www.westerburger-land.de

Rothenbach is an Ortsgemeinde – a community belonging to a Verbandsgemeinde – in the Westerwaldkreis in Rhineland-Palatinate, Germany.

== Geography ==
Rothenbach lies 8 km west of Westerburg. Since 1972 it has belonged to what was then the newly founded Verbandsgemeinde of Westerburg, a kind of collective municipality. Its seat is in Westerburg.

Rothenbach's Ortsteile are Rothenbach, Obersayn and Himburg.

== Politics ==
The council is made up of 13 council members, including the mayor (Bürgermeister), who were elected in a municipal election on 7 June 2009.

== Economy and infrastructure ==
The busses of the line 973 connect Rothenbach to the public transport, Rothenbach is located in the zone number 432 of the transport association VRM.

Right through the community runs Bundes⁷straße 255, leading from Montabaur to Herborn. The nearest Autobahn interchange is Montabaur on the A 3 (Cologne–Frankfurt).

The nearest InterCityExpress stop is the railway station at Montabaur on the Cologne-Frankfurt high-speed rail line.
