= Westerburg (Verbandsgemeinde) =

Municipality in Rhineland-Palatinate, Germany

- Verbandsgemeinde
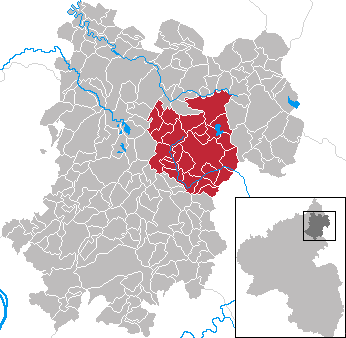
- Location of Westerburg within Westerwaldkreis district
- Interactive map of Westerburg
- Location within Germany Location within Rhineland-Palatinate
- Coordinates: 50°34′N 7°58′E
- Country: Germany
- State: Rhineland-Palatinate
- District: Westerwaldkreis
- Seat: Westerburg
- Subdivisions: 24 municipalities

Area
  - Total: 111.5 km^{2} (43.1 sq mi)

Population (2025-12-31)
  - Total: 23,575
  - Density: 211.4/km^{2} (547.6/sq mi)
- Time zone: UTC+01:00 (CET)
  - Summer (DST): UTC+02:00 (CEST)
- Website: www.vg-westerburg.de

Westerburg is a Verbandsgemeinde ("collective municipality") in the district Westerwaldkreis, in Rhineland-Palatinate, Germany. The seat of the Verbandsgemeinde is in Westerburg.

The Verbandsgemeinde Westerburg consists of the following Ortsgemeinden ("local municipalities"):

1. Ailertchen
2. Bellingen
3. Berzhahn
4. Brandscheid
5. Enspel
6. Gemünden
7. Girkenroth
8. Guckheim
9. Halbs
10. Härtlingen
11. Hergenroth
12. Höhn
13. Kaden
14. Kölbingen
15. Langenhahn
16. Pottum
17. Rotenhain
18. Rothenbach
19. Stahlhofen am Wiesensee
20. Stockum-Püschen
21. Weltersburg
22. Westerburg
23. Willmenrod
24. Winnen
