= Kölbingen =

- Municipality
- Old Catholic parish church on the Schoenberg between Möllingen and Koelbingen

- Coat of arms

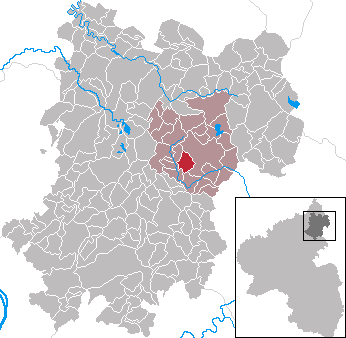
- Location of Kölbingen within Westerwaldkreis district
- Interactive map of Kölbingen
- Location within Germany Location within Rhineland-Palatinate
- Coordinates: 50°33′13″N 7°56′09″E
- Country: Germany
- State: Rhineland-Palatinate
- District: Westerwaldkreis
- Municipal assoc.: Westerburg
- Subdivisions: 3

Government
  - Mayor (2019–24): Frank Schäfer

Area
  - Total: 4.07 km^{2} (1.57 sq mi)
- Elevation: 377 m (1,237 ft)

Population (2025-12-31)
  - Total: 1,030
  - Density: 253/km^{2} (655/sq mi)
- Time zone: UTC+01:00 (CET)
  - Summer (DST): UTC+02:00 (CEST)
- Postal codes: 56459
- Dialling codes: 02663
- Vehicle registration: WW
- Website: www.koelbingen.de

Kölbingen is an Ortsgemeinde – a community belonging to a Verbandsgemeinde – in the Westerwaldkreis in Rhineland-Palatinate, Germany.

== Geography ==
=== Location ===
Kölbingen lies roughly 4 km west of Westerburg, in a hollow between the Geisenwald and the Ruhscheid. Since 1972 it has belonged to what was then the newly founded Verbandsgemeinde of Westerburg, a kind of collective municipality.

=== Constituent communities ===
Kölbingen's Ortsteile (divisions) are Schönberg, Möllingen and Kölbingen.

== History ==
In 1494, Kölbingen had its first documentary mention.

== Politics ==
The municipal council is made up of 16 council members, including the extraofficial mayor (Bürgermeister), who were elected in a majority vote in a municipal election on 26 May 2019.

== Economy and infrastructure ==
The village is located in the fare.zone number 432 of the public transport association Verkehrsverbund Rhein-Mosel (VRM).

The village is served by the public local busses of the line 481.

West of the community runs Bundesstraße 255, leading from Montabaur to Herborn. The nearest Autobahn interchange is Diez on the A 3 (Cologne–Frankfurt).

Kölbingen was connected to the Cross Westerwald Railway (Montabaur - Wallmerod - Westerburg - Rennerod - Herborn), but nowadays this line between Montabaur and Wallmerod is only in service for fright trains and from Fehl-Ritzhausen to Rennerod station touristic railbike tours take place, organized by the interest group IG Westerwald-Querbahn e. V. (IWQ).

Nowadays the nearest train station is Westerburg station.

The nearest InterCityExpress stop is the railway station at Montabaur on the Cologne-Frankfurt high-speed rail line.
