= Enspel =

- Municipality
- Coat of arms

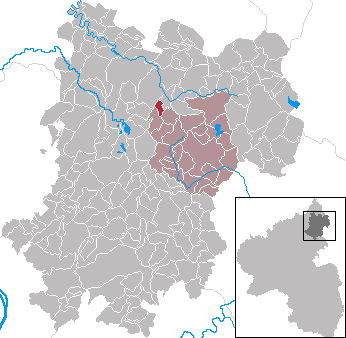
- Location of Enspel within Westerwaldkreis district
- Interactive map of Enspel
- Location within Germany Location within Rhineland-Palatinate
- Coordinates: 50°37′05″N 7°53′11″E
- Country: Germany
- State: Rhineland-Palatinate
- District: Westerwaldkreis
- Municipal assoc.: Westerburg

Government
  - Mayor (2019–24): Dieter Wisser

Area
  - Total: 1.46 km^{2} (0.56 sq mi)
- Elevation: 390 m (1,280 ft)

Population (2025-12-31)
  - Total: 280
  - Density: 190/km^{2} (500/sq mi)
- Time zone: UTC+01:00 (CET)
  - Summer (DST): UTC+02:00 (CEST)
- Postal codes: 57647
- Dialling codes: 02661
- Vehicle registration: WW
- Website: www.enspel.de

Enspel is an Ortsgemeinde – a municipality belonging to a Verbandsgemeinde – in the Westerwaldkreis in Rhineland-Palatinate, Germany.

== Geography ==
Enspel lies 10 km northwest of Westerburg on a bank on the west slope of the Stöffel, a basalt mountain. The municipality's structure is based on the nearby basalt quarries which were worked beginning about 1900. Worth seeing are the mighty crevices and outcrops in the Stöffel. Since 1972 Enspel has belonged to what was then the newly founded Verbandsgemeinde of Westerburg, a kind of collective municipality.

== History ==
In 1261, Enspel had its first documentary mention. In the 20th century, the famous Stöffelmaus was found. This was a fossil of a now extinct gliding rodent, Eomys quercyi.

== Politics ==
The municipal council is made up of 9 council members, including the extraofficial mayor (Bürgermeister), who were elected in a majority vote in a municipal election on 7 June 2009.

== Economy and infrastructure ==
=== Transport ===
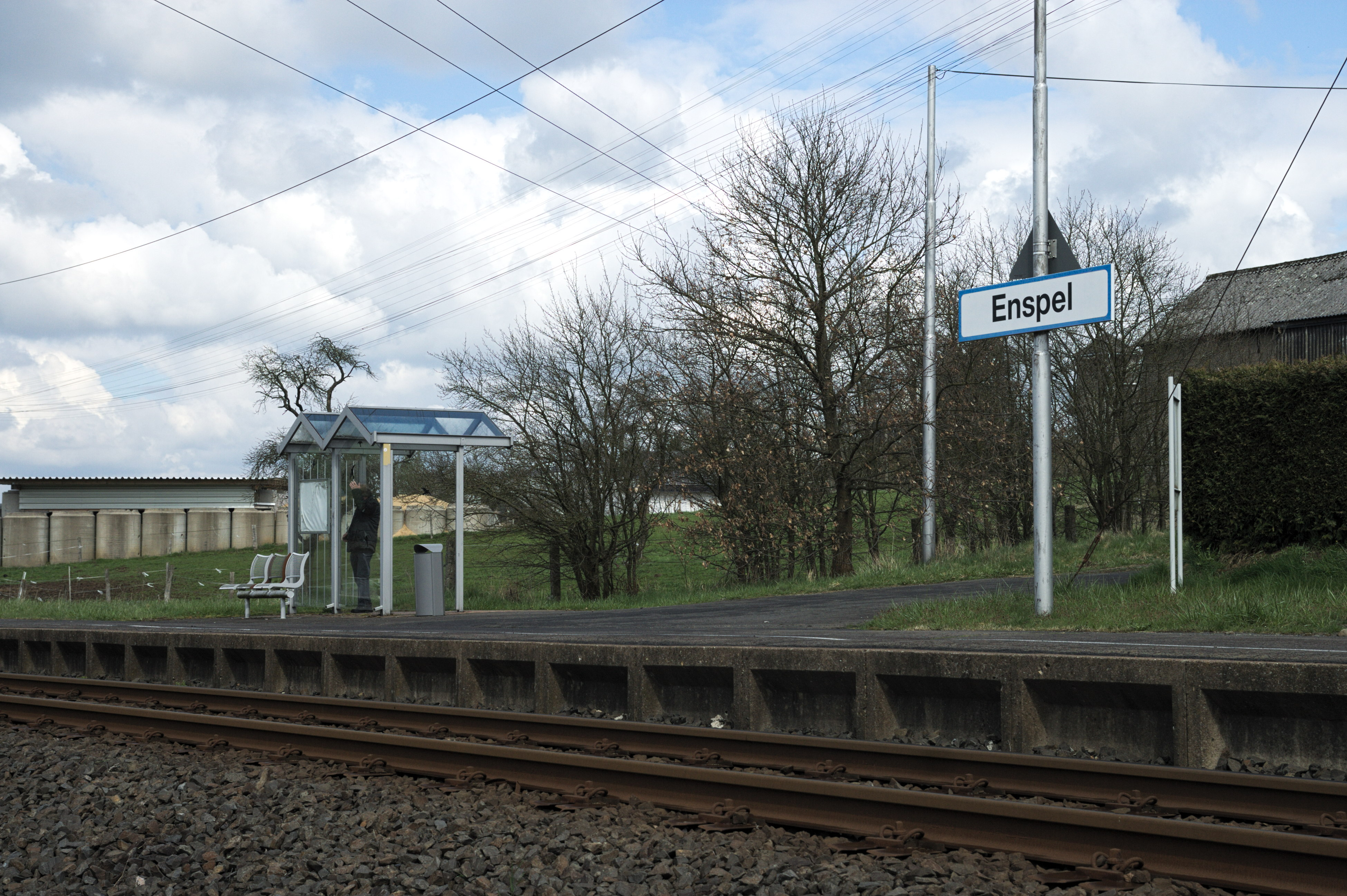
Enspel train stop

The local bus lines 959 and 965 serve Enspel. South of the municipality runs Bundesstraße 255 leading from Montabaur to Herborn. The nearest Autobahn interchange is Montabaur on the A 3 (Cologne–Frankfurt). Enspel lies on the Westerwald-Sieg-Bahn (RB90) of Hessische Landesbahn (HLB), section DreiLänderBahn Limburg and Au (Sieg). From the stations Siegen Hbf, Au (Sieg) and Limburg (Lahn), the cities of Cologne, Koblenz, Frankfurt am Main and Wiesbaden may be reached directly. Enspel is located in the area of the transport association Verkehrsverbund Rhein-Mosel (VRM), fare zone 439. Enspel is located on Westerwaldsteig, a long distance walking- and cycling path from Herborn via Rennerod, Westerburg, Bad Marienberg and Hachenburg to Bad Hönningen. The nearest InterCityExpress stop is the railway station at Montabaur on the Cologne-Frankfurt high-speed rail line.

=== Public institutions ===
- Fire brigade
- "Stöffelhalle" village association house
- "Am Stöffel" Guesthouse – self-catering
- Blockhütte (cabin)
- Jugendraum (“Youth Room”)
- Football area
- Two playgrounds
- Entrance to Stöffel-Park
