= Winnen =

- Municipality
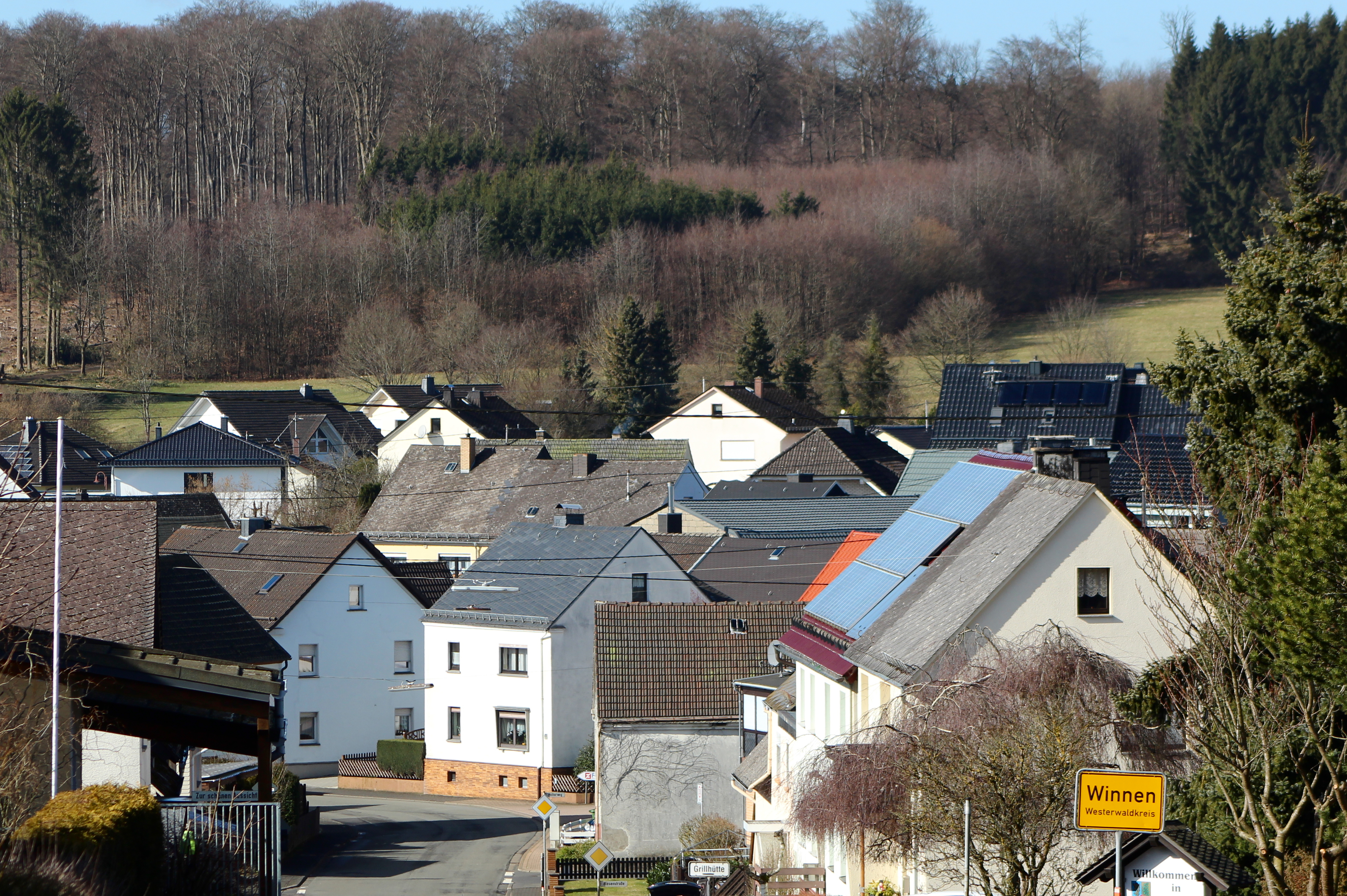

- Coat of arms

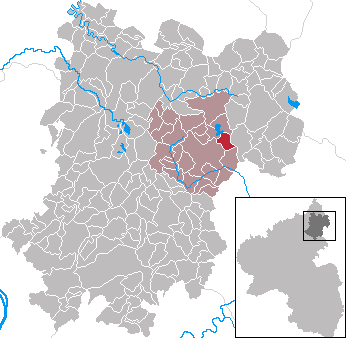
- Location of Winnen within Westerwaldkreis district
- Interactive map of Winnen
- Location within Germany Location within Rhineland-Palatinate
- Coordinates: 50°34′24″N 8°0′42″E
- Country: Germany
- State: Rhineland-Palatinate
- District: Westerwaldkreis
- Municipal assoc.: Westerburg

Government
  - Mayor (2019–24): Ralf Wengenroth

Area
  - Total: 3.26 km^{2} (1.26 sq mi)
- Elevation: 428 m (1,404 ft)

Population (2025-12-31)
  - Total: 502
  - Density: 154/km^{2} (399/sq mi)
- Time zone: UTC+01:00 (CET)
  - Summer (DST): UTC+02:00 (CEST)
- Postal codes: 56459
- Dialling codes: 02663
- Vehicle registration: WW
- Website: www.winnenww.de

Winnen is an Ortsgemeinde – a community belonging to a Verbandsgemeinde – in the Westerwaldkreis in Rhineland-Palatinate, Germany.

== Geography ==
Winnen lies 4 km west of Westerburg on the Wiesensee (lake). Since 1972 it has belonged to what was then the newly founded Verbandsgemeinde of Westerburg, a kind of collective municipality. Its seat is in the like-named town.

The north of the community's municipal area includes the southern part of the 80 ha Wiesensee, which can be reached from the community in a few minutes. The "Wiesensee" holiday and recreation area offers not only lake scenery (with hiking around the lake), but also opportunities to engage in sporting activities (bathing, sailing, surfing, angling, golf at an 18-hole course with hotel facilities).

Just south of the community, where since autumn 2007 the Westerwaldsteig (hiking trail) has run, the land falls away into the Elbbach valley and opens onto a unique view over the valley area towards the highest elevations in the Taunus.

== Politics ==
=== Community council ===
The council is made up of 6 council members, including the extraofficial mayor (Bürgermeister), who were elected in a majority vote in a municipal election on 13 June 2004.

=== Coat of arms ===
The linden twig is symbolic of the outdoor court, the Stuhllindengericht Winnen, which was responsible for nine tithing areas, for which the nine linden leaves stand, into the 17th century. The court's jurisdiction finds reference in the balance.

The heraldic animal charge, the lion with its tongue out, stands for the many years in which the community was ruled by the Nassau Counts, Nassau-Orange or the Duchy of Nassau, which is also shown in the tinctures, gold and blue, which were also Nassau's.

The red field tincture recalls the Westerburg Counts, who were Winnen's overlords for a long time. Likewise the blue field tincture recalls this.

== Culture and sightseeing ==
=== Music ===
The Konkordia Winnen men's singing club takes part in many village and church events. In 2008, the choir celebrated its 100-year jubilee.

=== Sport ===
The TTC Winnen 70 e.V. (table tennis club) is made up of seven active table tennis teams, three women's and two children's gymnastics groups, one men's gymnastics group, and one recreational football team. It currently has roughly 300 members.

=== Public institutions ===
- Dorfgemeinschaftshaus

== Economy and infrastructure ==
Winnen is located in the area of the transport association Verkehrsverbund Rhein-Mosel (VRM), fare zone number 430. The local bus line serving Winnen is 477. The nearest access to the public railway service is the Berzhahn stop. East of the community runs Bundesstraße 54, leading from Limburg an der Lahn to Siegen. Winnen is located on Westerwaldsteig, a long distance walking- and cycling path from Herborn via Rennerod, Westerburg, Bad Marienberg and Hachenburg to Bad Hönningen. The nearest Autobahn interchange is Montabaur on the A 3 (Cologne–Frankfurt). The nearest InterCityExpress stop is the railway station at Montabaur on the Cologne-Frankfurt high-speed rail line.
