= Bellingen, Rhineland-Palatinate =

Bellingen
- Municipality
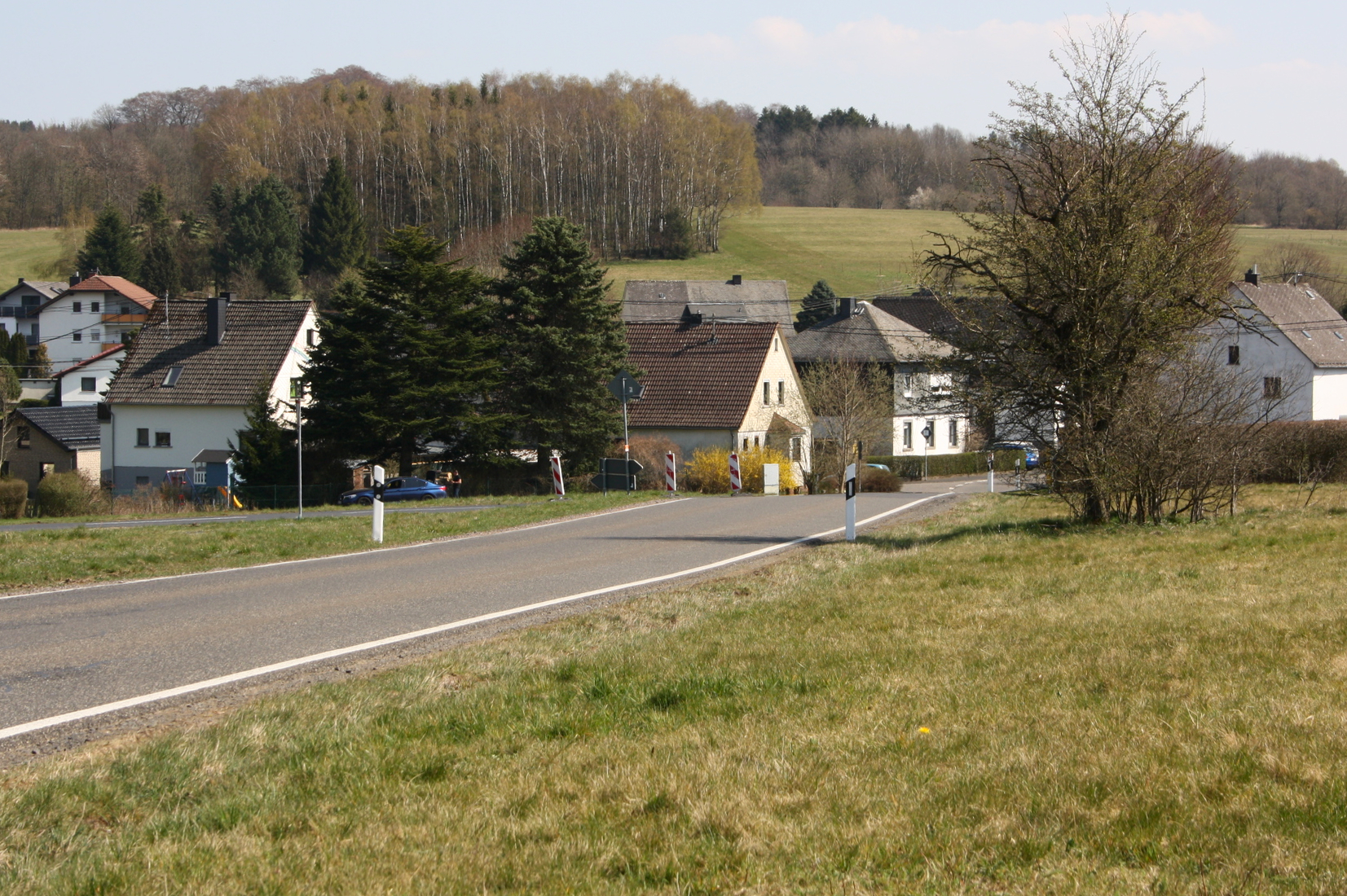

- Coat of arms

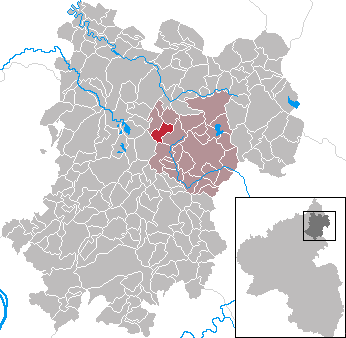
- Location of Bellingen within Westerwaldkreis district
- Interactive map of Bellingen
- Location within Germany Location within Rhineland-Palatinate
- Coordinates: 50°35′31″N 7°54′25″E
- Country: Germany
- State: Rhineland-Palatinate
- District: Westerwaldkreis
- Municipal assoc.: Westerburg

Government
  - Mayor (2019–24): Michael Wisser

Area
  - Total: 4.29 km^{2} (1.66 sq mi)
- Elevation: 430 m (1,410 ft)

Population (2025-12-31)
  - Total: 617
  - Density: 144/km^{2} (372/sq mi)
- Time zone: UTC+01:00 (CET)
  - Summer (DST): UTC+02:00 (CEST)
- Postal codes: 56459
- Dialling codes: 02663
- Vehicle registration: WW
- Website: www.bellingen.de

Bellingen (German pronunciation: [ˈbɛlɪŋən]) is an Ortsgemeinde – a municipality belonging to a Verbandsgemeinde – in the Westerwaldkreis in Rhineland-Palatinate, Germany.

== Geography ==
Bellingen lies in a hollow northwest of Westerburg. Since 1972 it has belonged to what was then the newly founded Verbandsgemeinde of Westerburg, a kind of collective municipality.

== Politics ==
The municipal council is made up of 8 council members, including the extraofficial mayor (Bürgermeister), who were elected in a majority vote in a municipal election on 7 June 2009.

== Economy and infrastructure ==
The local bus lines 959 and 965 connect Bellingen to the public transport, the village is located on the area of the transport association Verkehrsverbund Rhein-Mosel (VRM), zone number 439.

South of the municipality runs Bundesstraße 255, leading from Montabaur to Herborn.

The nearest Autobahn interchange is Montabaur on the A 3. The nearest InterCityExpress stop is the railway station at Montabaur on the Cologne-Frankfurt high-speed rail line.
