= Brandscheid, Westerwaldkreis =

Brandscheid
- Municipality
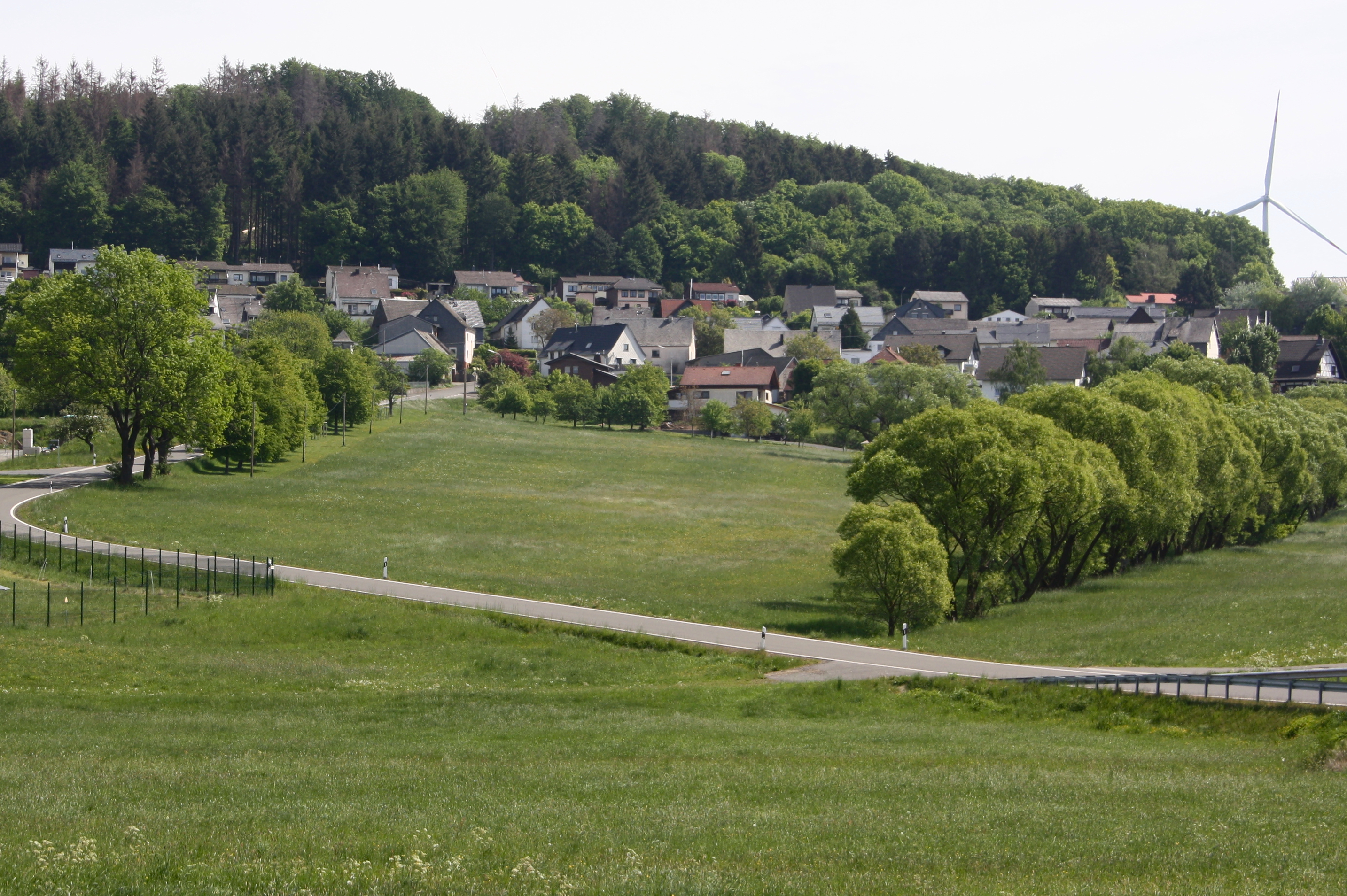

- Coat of arms

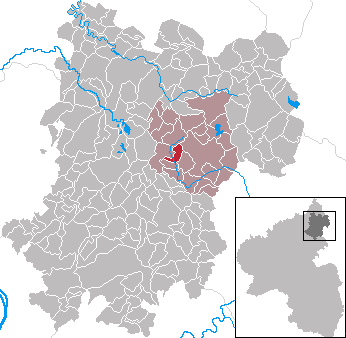
- Location of Brandscheid within Westerwaldkreis district
- Interactive map of Brandscheid
- Location within Germany Location within Rhineland-Palatinate
- Coordinates: 50°33′39″N 7°55′13″E
- Country: Germany
- State: Rhineland-Palatinate
- District: Westerwaldkreis
- Municipal assoc.: Westerburg

Government
  - Mayor (2019–24): Erhard Meutsch

Area
  - Total: 3.03 km^{2} (1.17 sq mi)
- Elevation: 420 m (1,380 ft)

Population (2025-12-31)
  - Total: 499
  - Density: 165/km^{2} (427/sq mi)
- Time zone: UTC+01:00 (CET)
  - Summer (DST): UTC+02:00 (CEST)
- Postal codes: 56459
- Dialling codes: 02663
- Vehicle registration: WW
- Website: www.brandscheid.de

Brandscheid (German pronunciation: [ˈbʁantˌʃaɪt]) is an Ortsgemeinde – a municipality belonging to a Verbandsgemeinde – in the Westerwaldkreis in Rhineland-Palatinate, Germany.

== Geography ==
Brandscheid lies on a mountain slope in the broad woodlands west of Westerburg. Since 1972 it has belonged to what was then the newly founded Verbandsgemeinde of Westerburg, a kind of collective municipality.

== Economy and infrastructure ==
Northwest of the municipality runs Bundesstraße 255 leading from Montabaur to Herborn. The nearest Autobahn interchange is Montabaur on the A 3. The nearest InterCityExpress stop is the railway station at Montabaur on the Cologne-Frankfurt high-speed rail line.
