= Willmenrod =

- Municipality
- Coat of arms

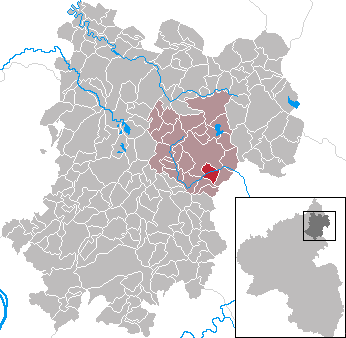
- Location of Willmenrod within Westerwaldkreis district
- Interactive map of Willmenrod
- Location within Germany Location within Rhineland-Palatinate
- Coordinates: 50°32′29″N 7°58′53″E
- Country: Germany
- State: Rhineland-Palatinate
- District: Westerwaldkreis
- Municipal assoc.: Westerburg

Government
  - Mayor (2019–24): Günter Weigel

Area
  - Total: 3.63 km^{2} (1.40 sq mi)
- Elevation: 305 m (1,001 ft)

Population (2025-12-31)
  - Total: 663
  - Density: 183/km^{2} (473/sq mi)
- Time zone: UTC+01:00 (CET)
  - Summer (DST): UTC+02:00 (CEST)
- Postal codes: 56459
- Dialling codes: 02663
- Vehicle registration: WW
- Website: www.willmenrod.de

Willmenrod is an Ortsgemeinde – a community belonging to a Verbandsgemeinde – in the Westerwaldkreis in Rhineland-Palatinate, Germany.

== Geography ==
=== Location ===
Willmenrod lies in the valley of the Elbach between the 475-m-high Watzenhahn and the Stromberg in the middle of the Westerwald.

=== Geology ===
The landscape is characterized by basalt and clay deposits. Until after the war, basalt was still being quarried in Willmenrod and broken up into chips and crushed stone in the community. One hundred and twenty hectares of the municipal area is wooded.

=== Neighbouring communities ===
Willmenrod borders in the north on Sainscheid and Westerburg, in the east on Wengenroth and Berzhahn, in the south on Girkenroth and Dorndorf and in the west on Weltersburg and Guckheim.

=== Climate ===
Despite the claim to the contrary in the folksong Oh du schöner Westerwald, the wind does not whistle quite so cold. Rather, a moderate climate holds sway here. In winter, the snow is limited, in summer, it is only seldom unbearably hot and when there is stormy weather, the two mountain ridges keep the wind off the community's location.

== History ==
In 1212, Willmenrod had its first documentary mention as Wernbolderode. Since 1712 it has borne its current name.

In 1805, almost the whole village was burnt down in a great fire. Owing to the thatched roofs and tight rows of houses that prevailed then, such a catastrophe was very nearly inevitable.

Owing to the community's location on the Elbbach, which afforded a great deal of waterpower, it was possible to run five mills here.

=== Religion ===
Willmenrod is overwhelmingly Evangelical.

=== Population development ===
For a few years, the population figure has been swinging between 650 and 700.

== Politics ==
=== Community council ===
The council is made up of 13 council members, including the extraofficial mayor (Bürgermeister), who were elected in a majority vote in a municipal election on 13 June 2004.

=== Coat of arms ===
The waterwheel in community's arms stands for the five mills which were formerly of great importance. The lozenges stand for the lesser noble house of Willmenrod. The blue wavy fess stands for the Elbbach's special importance. The various tinctures stand for the community's changing overlords.

== Culture and sightseeing ==
=== Clubs ===
Willmenrod has a fire brigade, a sport club, a fruit-growing and gardening club and a mixed choir.

== Notable people ==
- Television cook Clemens Wilmenrod, who took his stage name from the community's name, and is buried in the graveyard here.

== Transport ==
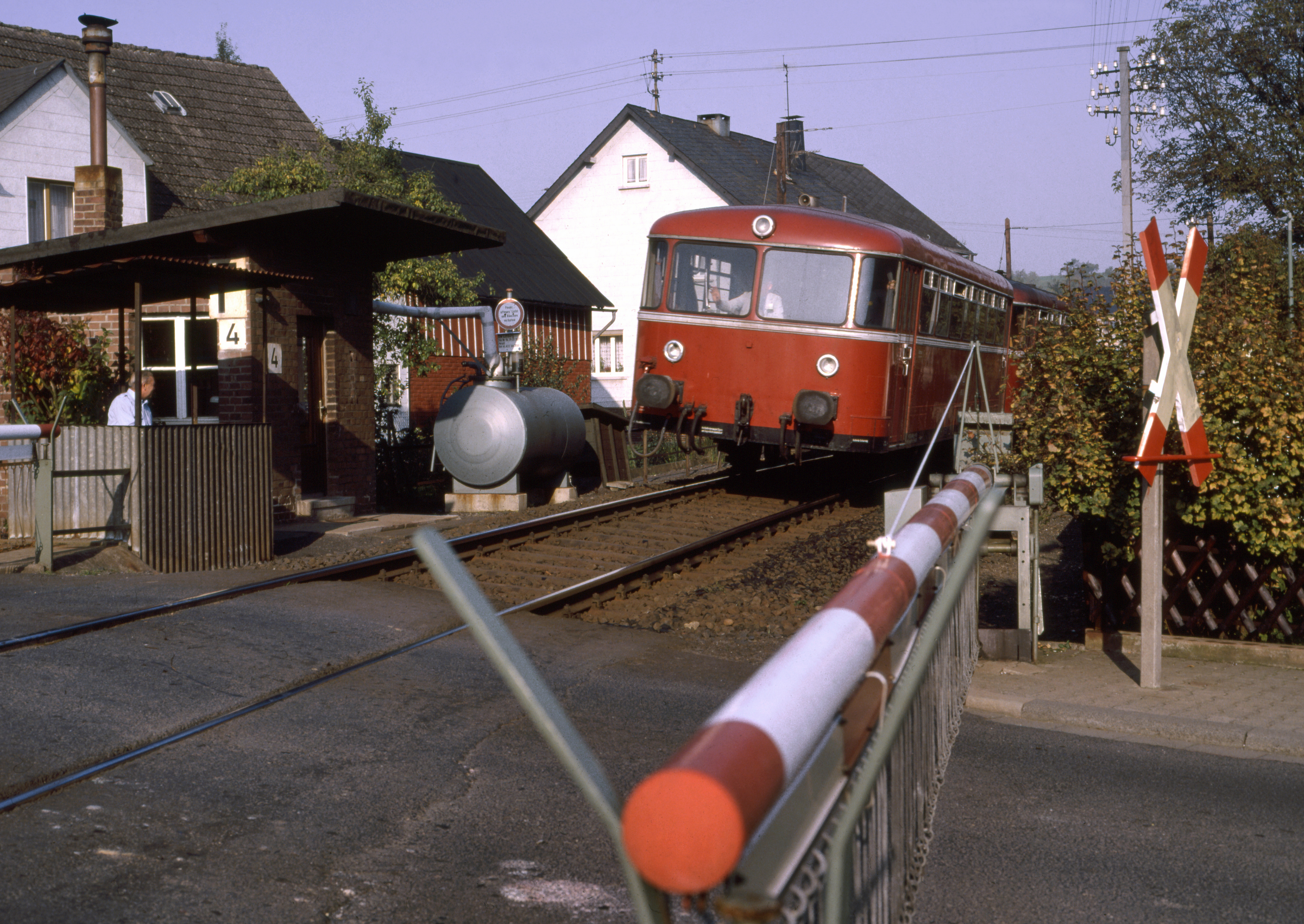
Railroad crossing in Willmenrod

Willmenrod has a stop at the Westerwald-Sieg-Railwayrailway, which is served by the local trains of the line RB90 (Limburg (Lahn) - Diez Ost - Westerburg - Hachenburg - Altenkirchen - Au (Sieg) - Kirchen - Siegen Hbf) by Hessische Landesbahn (HLB), section DreiLänderBahn.

From Limburg and Au (Sieg) station there are straight connections to Frankfurt/Main, Wiesbaden, Koblenz, Cologne and Aachen. Willmenrod is loced in the area of the transport association Verkehrsverbund Rhein-Mosel (VRM), Tarifwabe (fare zone) no. 431.

Also the local bus lines 481 and 965 serve Willmenrod.
