= Härtlingen =

- Municipality
- Coat of arms

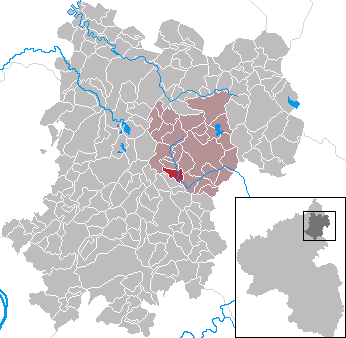
- Location of Härtlingen within Westerwaldkreis district
- Interactive map of Härtlingen
- Location within Germany Location within Rhineland-Palatinate
- Coordinates: 50°31′27″N 7°54′59″E
- Country: Germany
- State: Rhineland-Palatinate
- District: Westerwaldkreis
- Municipal assoc.: Westerburg

Government
  - Mayor (2019–24): David Olberts

Area
  - Total: 3.20 km^{2} (1.24 sq mi)
- Elevation: 374 m (1,227 ft)

Population (2025-12-31)
  - Total: 385
  - Density: 120/km^{2} (312/sq mi)
- Time zone: UTC+01:00 (CET)
  - Summer (DST): UTC+02:00 (CEST)
- Postal codes: 56459
- Dialling codes: 02663
- Vehicle registration: WW
- Website: www.haertlingen.de

Härtlingen is an Ortsgemeinde – a community belonging to a Verbandsgemeinde – in the Westerwaldkreis in Rhineland-Palatinate, Germany.

== Geography ==
=== Location ===
Härtlingen lies 5 km southwest of Westerburg in the Elbbach Valley. Since 1972 it has belonged to what was then the newly founded Verbandsgemeinde of Westerburg, a kind of collective municipality.

=== Constituent communities ===
Härtlingen has an outlying centre called Unterhärtlingen.

== History ==
In 1292, Härtlingen had its first documentary mention as Hertlingen.

== Politics ==
The municipal council is made up of 9 council members, including the extraofficial mayor (Bürgermeister), who were elected in a majority vote in a municipal election on 7 June 2009.

== Economy and infrastructure ==
The village is connected to the local bus line 481 and located in the transport association VRM, zone number 432. West of the community runs Bundesstraße 255, leading from Montabaur to Herborn. The nearest Autobahn interchange is Montabaur on the A 3 (Cologne–Frankfurt). The nearest InterCityExpress stop is the railway station at Montabaur on the Cologne-Frankfurt high-speed rail line.
