= Ailertchen =

- Municipality
- Coat of arms

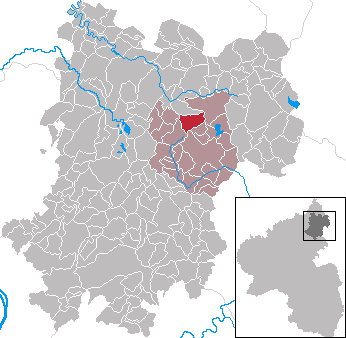
- Location of Ailertchen within Westerwaldkreis district
- Interactive map of Ailertchen
- Location within Germany Location within Rhineland-Palatinate
- Coordinates: 50°35′55″N 7°56′31″E
- Country: Germany
- State: Rhineland-Palatinate
- District: Westerwaldkreis
- Municipal assoc.: Westerburg

Government
  - Mayor (2019–24): Cathrin Michel-Baldus

Area
  - Total: 5.58 km^{2} (2.15 sq mi)
- Elevation: 475 m (1,558 ft)

Population (2025-12-31)
  - Total: 665
  - Density: 119/km^{2} (309/sq mi)
- Time zone: UTC+01:00 (CET)
  - Summer (DST): UTC+02:00 (CEST)
- Postal codes: 56459
- Dialling codes: 02663
- Vehicle registration: WW
- Website: www.westerburger-land.de

Ailertchen (formerly Elbörtchen) is an Ortsgemeinde – a municipality belonging to a Verbandsgemeinde – in the Westerwaldkreis in Rhineland-Palatinate, Germany. Since 1972 it has belonged to what was then the newly founded Verbandsgemeinde of Westerburg, a kind of collective municipality.

== Geography ==
Ailertchen lies 6 km northwest of Westerburg on a broad plain. Within the municipality rises the river Elbbach, part of the river Lahn’s drainage basin. At the municipality's southern edge lies the Ailertchen airport.

== History ==
In 930, Ailertchen had its first documentary mention.

== Politics ==
The municipal council is made up of 13 council members, including the extraofficial mayor (Bürgermeister), who were elected in a majority vote in a municipal election on 13 June 2004.

== Economy and infrastructure ==
Ailertchen is connected through the local bus lines 463, 464, 470, 485, 965, N47 and N48 and located in the area of the transport association Verkehrsverbund Rhein-Mosel (VRM). Running straight through the municipality is the Bundesstraße 255 leading from Montabaur to Herborn. The nearest Autobahn interchange is Montabaur on the A 3, roughly 23 km away. Another Autobahn interchange on the A 3 can be reached by Bundesstraße 54 running towards Limburg. This is roughly 28 km away. Bundesstraße 255 towards Herborn leads to the A 45. The nearest InterCityExpress stop is the railway station at Montabaur on the Cologne-Frankfurt high-speed rail line.
