= Berzhahn =

- Municipality
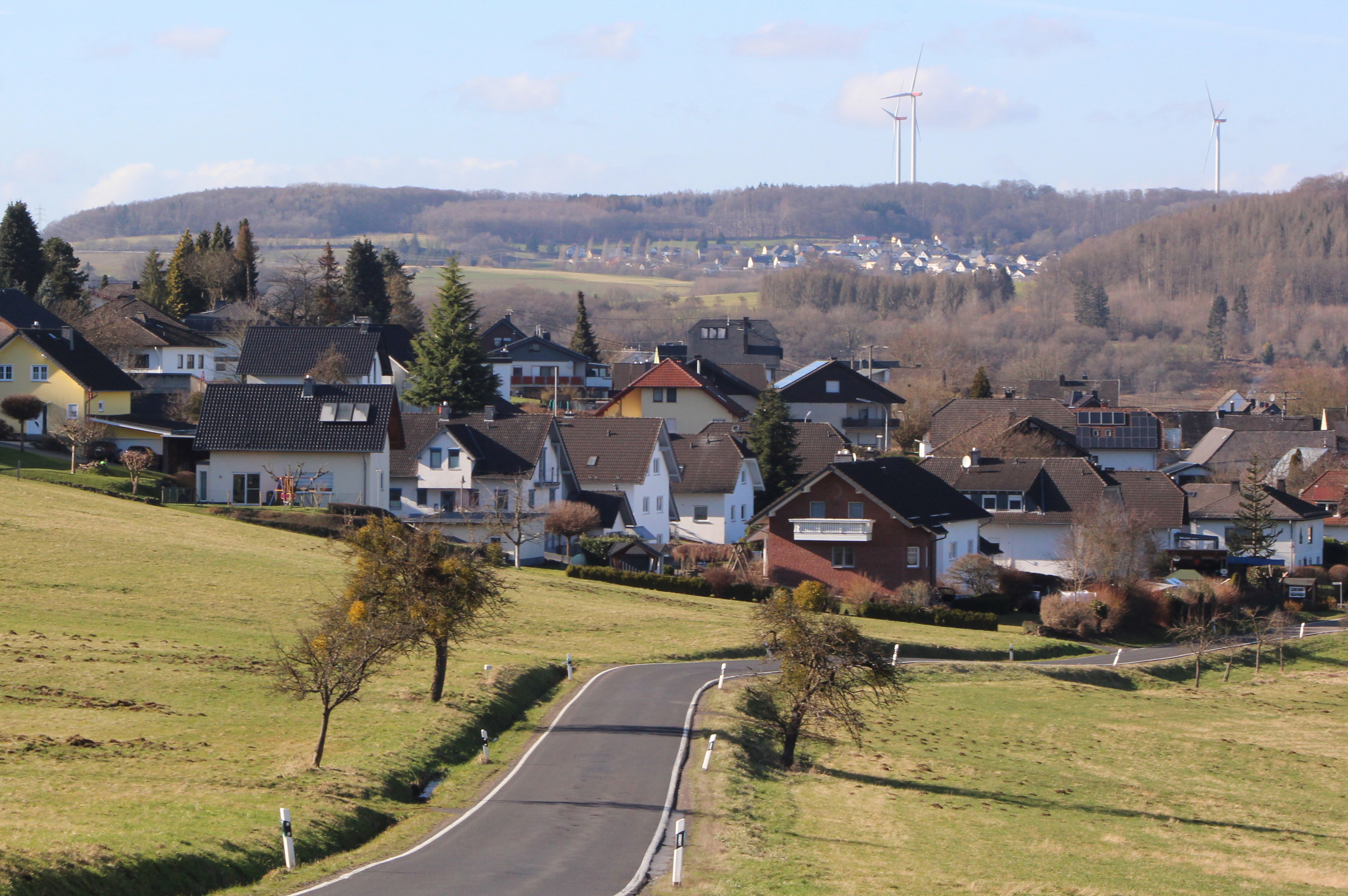

- Coat of arms

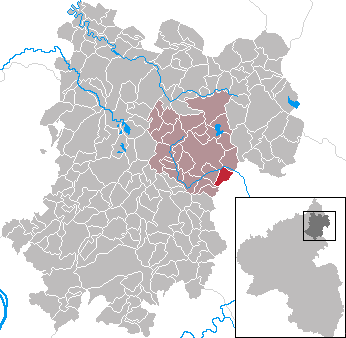
- Location of Berzhahn within Westerwaldkreis district
- Interactive map of Berzhahn
- Location within Germany Location within Rhineland-Palatinate
- Coordinates: 50°32′24″N 8°00′24″E
- Country: Germany
- State: Rhineland-Palatinate
- District: Westerwaldkreis
- Municipal assoc.: Westerburg

Government
  - Mayor (2019–24): Markus Hof

Area
  - Total: 3.26 km^{2} (1.26 sq mi)
- Elevation: 310 m (1,020 ft)

Population (2025-12-31)
  - Total: 487
  - Density: 149/km^{2} (387/sq mi)
- Time zone: UTC+01:00 (CET)
  - Summer (DST): UTC+02:00 (CEST)
- Postal codes: 56459
- Dialling codes: 02663
- Vehicle registration: WW
- Website: www.berzhahn.de

Berzhahn is an Ortsgemeinde – a municipality belonging to a Verbandsgemeinde – in the Westerwaldkreis in Rhineland-Palatinate, Germany.

== Geography ==
Berzhahn lies on the north slope of the broad woodland 4 km southeast of Westerburg. Since 1972 it has belonged to what was then the newly founded Verbandsgemeinde of Westerburg, a kind of collective municipality.

== History ==
In 1338, Berzhahn had its first documentary mention.

== Politics ==
The municipal council is made up of 13 council members, including the extraofficial mayor (Bürgermeister), who were elected in a majority vote in a municipal election on 7 June 2009.

== Economy and infrastructure ==
Berzhahn has a stop at the Limburg-Altenkirchen railway, which is served by the local trains of the line RB90 of Hessische Landesbahn (HLB), section DreiLänderBahn (Limburg - Diez Ost - Westerburg - Hachenburg - Altenkirchen - Au (Sieg) - Kirchen - Siegen Hbf). From Limburg and Au (Sieg) station there are straight connections to Frankfurt/Main, Wiesbaden, Koblenz, Cologne and Aachen. Berzhahn is located in the Tarifwabe (fare zone) 429 of the transport association Verkehrsverbund Rhein-Mosel (VRM).

Local bus lines serving Berzhahn are 481, 965 and 973.

Southeast of the municipality runs Bundesstraße 255, which leads from Montabaur to Rennerod. The nearest Autobahn interchanges are Montabaur and Limburg an der Lahn on the A 3 (Cologne–Frankfurt am Main).

The nearest InterCityExpress stops are the railway stations at Montabaur and Limburg Süd on the Cologne-Frankfurt high-speed rail line.

For electricity production, the villages Salz and Berzhahn share a wind farm on their ground.
