= Westerburg station =

Railway station in Westerburg, Germany

Westerburg
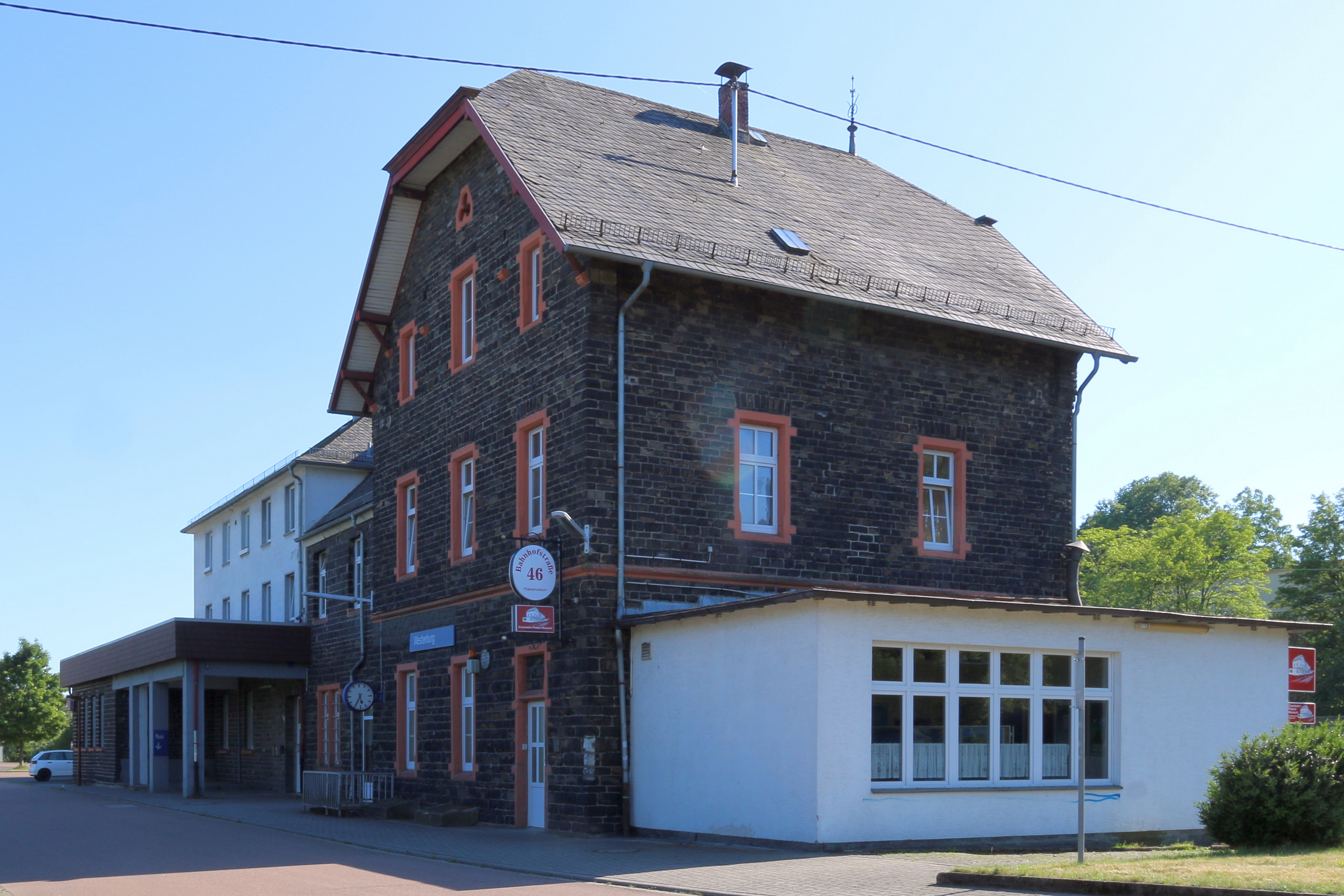
- Entrance building (2015)

General information
- Location: Bahnhofstr. 46, Westerburg, Rhineland-Palatinate; Germany
- Coordinates: 50°33′28″N 7°58′02″E
- Lines: Limburg–Altenkirchen (km 28.6) (KBS 461); Herborn–Montabaur (km 48.3; closed)
- Platforms: 2

Construction
- Accessible: Yes

Other information
- Station code: 6710
- DS100 code: FWBG
- IBNR: 8000245
- Category: 6
- Fare zone: VRM: 431
- Website: www.bahnhof.de

History
- Opened: 1 October 1886

Services
Preceding station	Hessische Landesbahn	Following station
Langenhahn towards Siegen Hbf	RB 90	Willmenrod towards Limburg (Lahn)
Location

Westerburg station is a junction station on the currently closed Herborn–Montabaur railway (also called in German the Westerwaldquerbahn, Cross Westerwald Railway) and the still operated Limburg–Altenkirchen railway (also called the Oberwesterwaldbahn, Upper Westerwald Railway). It is in Westerburg in Westerwaldkreis, in the German state of Rhineland-Palatinate.

== History ==
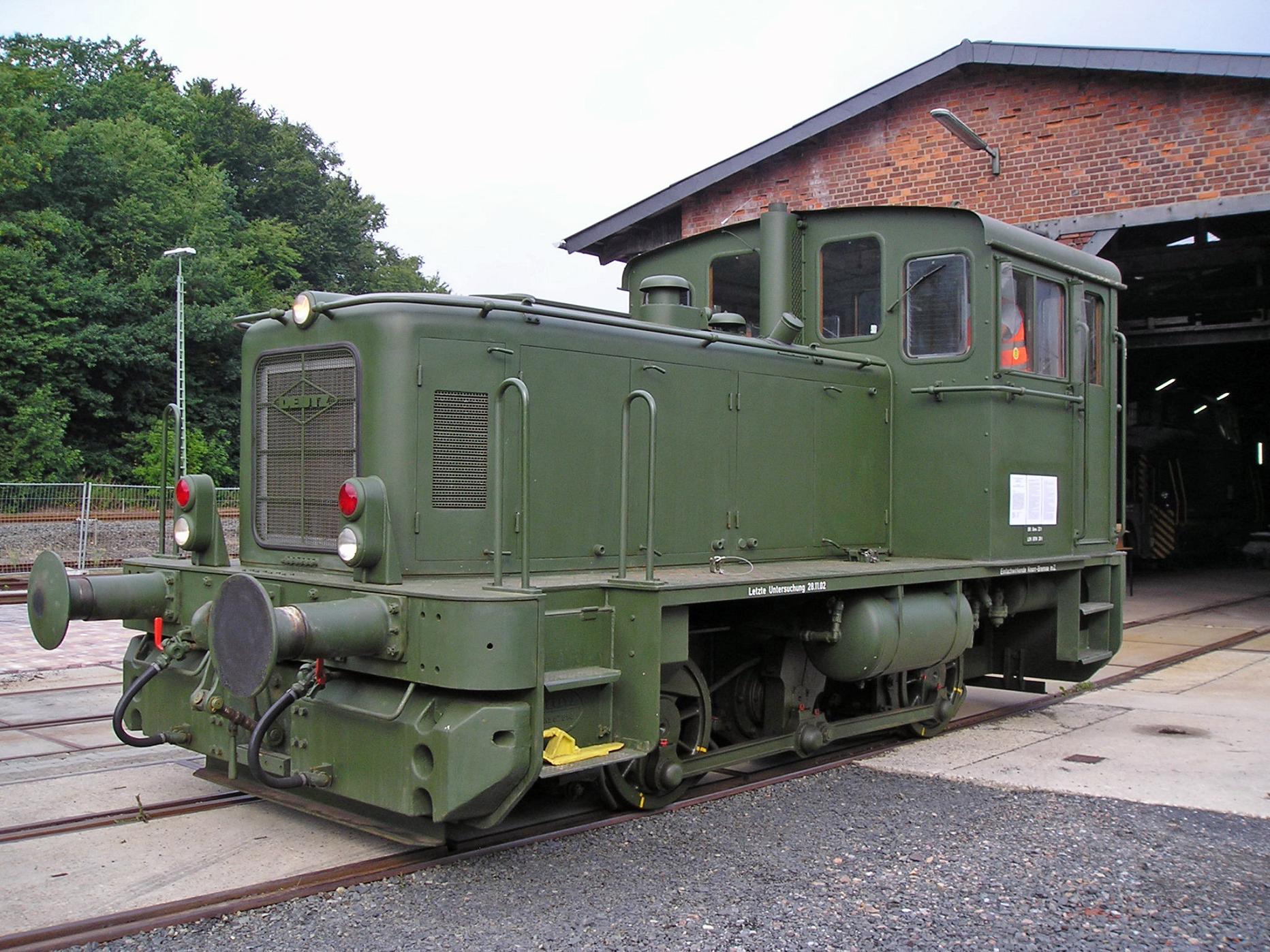
Deutz KS 230 B in the rail technology museum at the station (2008)

The station was opened together with the corresponding section of the Upper Westerwald Railway on 1 October 1886. The entrance building of the station was not completed until 1887. The Cross Westerwald Railway went into operation from Westerburg to Herborn on 16 July 1907 and was extended to Montabaur on 1 June 1910. The station building was then in the form of an Inselbahnhof ("island station", that is surrounded by tracks). There were a number of sidings to local industrial sites.

Passenger services was stopped on both sections of the Cross Westerwald Railway that connect with Westerburg on 31 May 1981. Since that time, services for passengers at the station have been increasingly restricted; later the handling of freight was abandoned and the tracks to the east of the entrance building were removed so that the station was no longer an island station. Freight operations towards Montabaur were discontinued in 1985 and towards Rennerod in 1995. In the course of rail reform, the entrance building was privatised.

== Current situation ==
The station still has four tracks, of which two are platform tracks. Track 2 is next to the entrance building and track 3 is on an island that can only be reached by a passenger level crossing. The entrance building houses the Eisenbahnplakat-Museum (Railway Poster Museum). The former two-track roundhouse in the northern part of the station has been used by Westerwälder Eisenbahnfreunden since 2003.

== Rail services ==
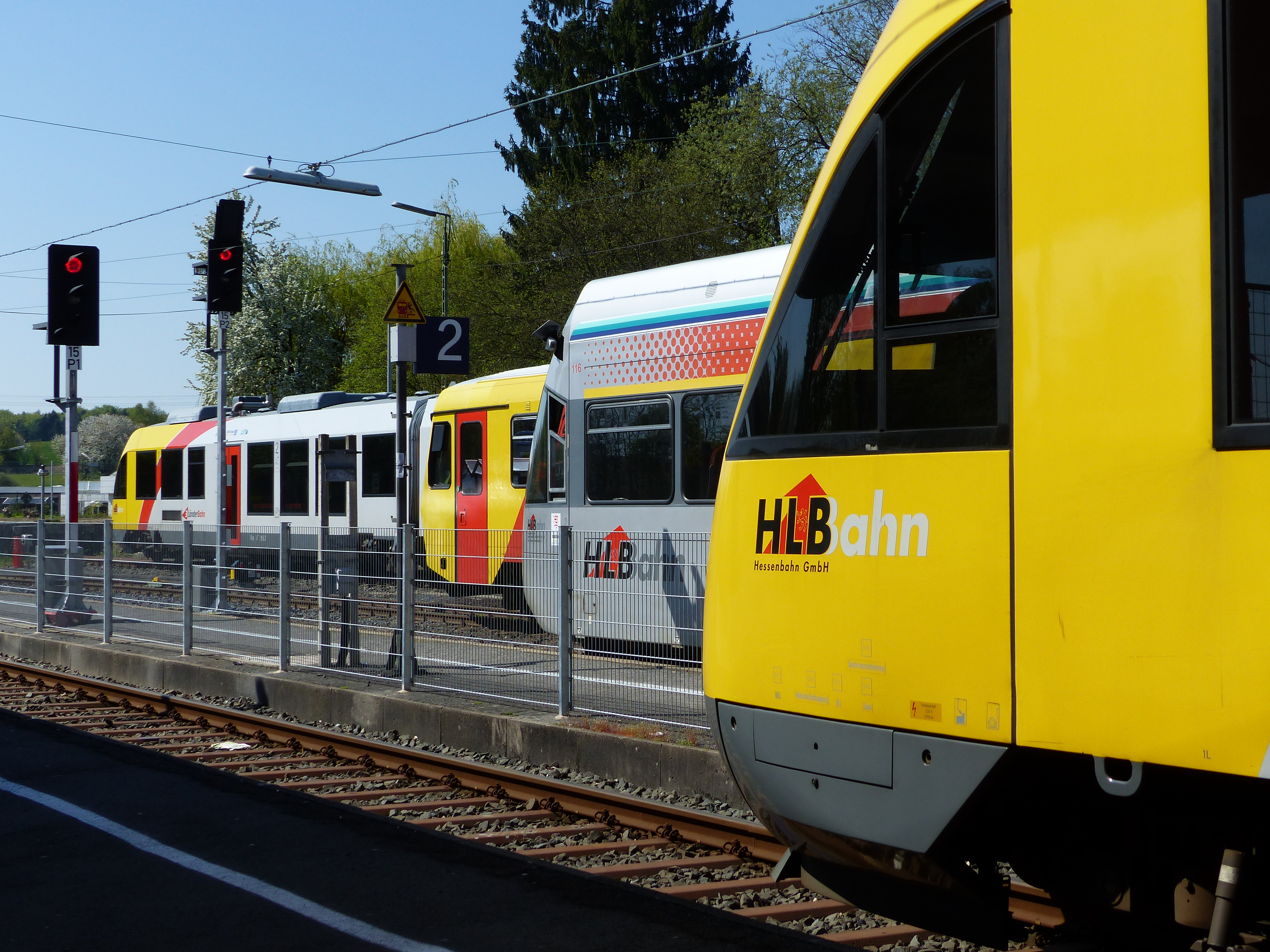
Four HLB DMUs in Westerburg station

The station is now served by trains operated by DreiLänderBahn, a subsidiary of Hessische Landesbahn, which run towards Limburg (Lahn) and Siegen on line RB90 (Westerwald-Sieg-Bahn). In addition, there are buses to the region, including the Rhein-Mosel-Bus route 116 (Montabaur Bahnhof/FOM – Westerburg – Rennerod Busbf. / Bad Marienberg, which partly also follows the route of the closed Cross Westerwald Railway. In front of the station there is a commuter parking area and a "Bike and ride" facility. The transport services are carried out on behalf of the Zweckverband Bahnpersonennahverkehr Rheinland-Pfalz Nord (northern Rhineland-Palatinate rail transport association, SPNV Nord) and are operated under the Rhineland-Palatinate regular-interval integrated timetable. On the section between Westerburg and Siegen, which is mostly in Rhineland-Palatinate, services have generally run hourly from Monday to Sunday since the change of timetable in December 2014; during the peak there are additional services. In order to be able to guarantee the connections to Cologne and Frankfurt at the stations of Au (Sieg) and Limburg, most services terminate in Westerburg. There are only a few continuous runs between Limburg and Au (Sieg). The fares of the Verkehrsverbund Rhein-Mosel (VRM) have also applied in Westerwaldkreis since 1 January 2017, Westerburg station is located in the VRM fare zone 431.

Line	Route	Interval
RB 90	Siegen Hbf – Betzdorf – Wissen (Sieg) – Au (Sieg) – Altenkirchen (Westerw) – Hachenburg – Nistertal-Bad Marienberg – Westerburg – Dornburg – Hadamar – Elz – Staffel – Diez Ost – Limburg (Lahn)	Hourly. Extra services in the peak between Betzdorf and Altenkirchen.

== B+R / P+R ==
At the train station, on the ground of the deconstructed tracks of the former Westerwaldquerbahn line, a Bike and ride facility and a Park and ride lot has been constructed.

== Transport association ==
Verkehrsverbund Rhein-Mosel

Due to the location in the Westerwald district, Westerburg station is loctated in the area of the transport association Verkehrsverbund Rhein-Mosel (VRM), the VRM fare applies for bus and train rides.
