= Zehnhausen bei Rennerod =

- Municipality
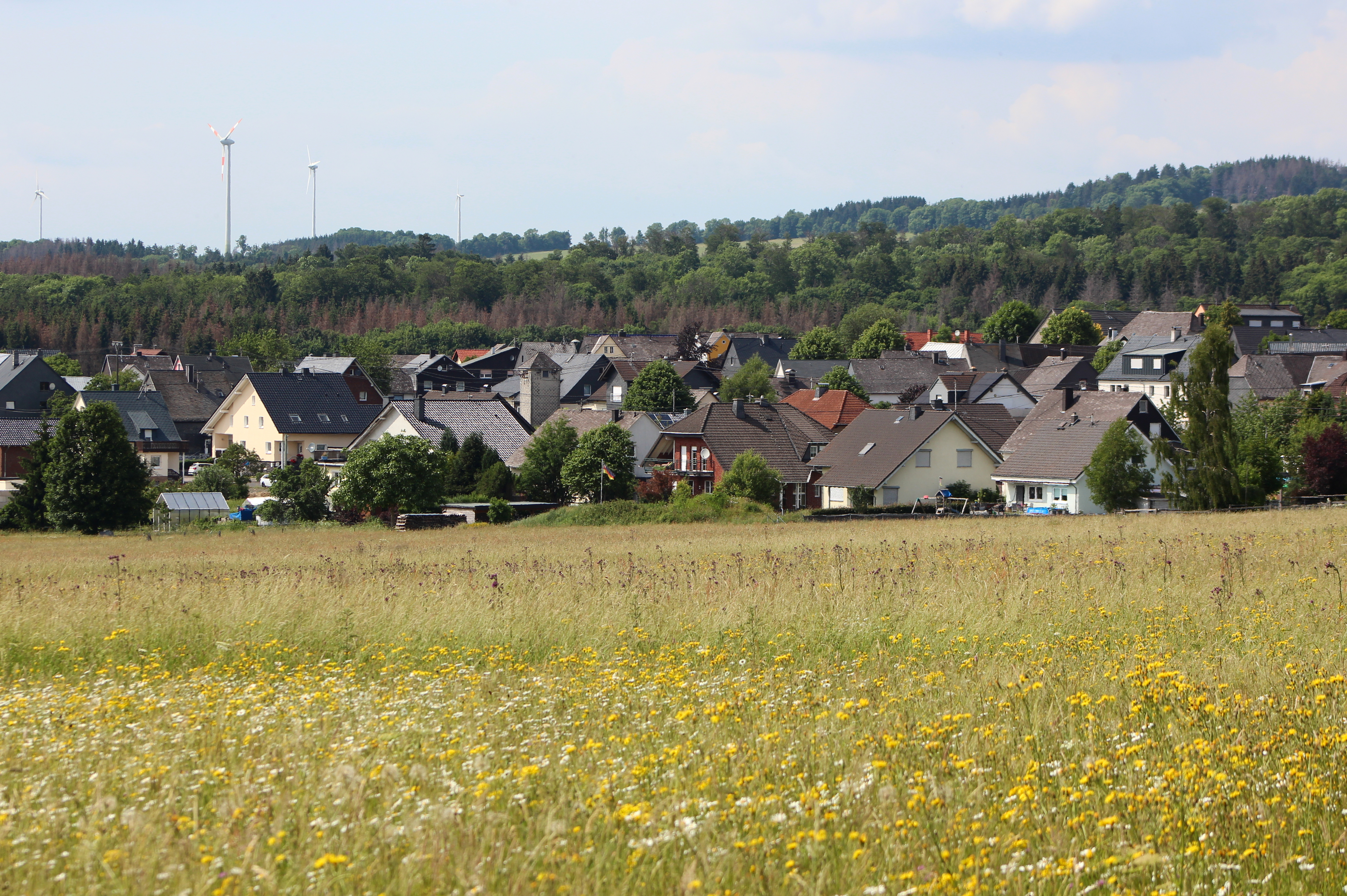

- Coat of arms

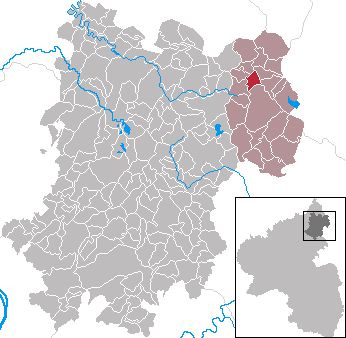
- Location of Zehnhausen bei Rennerod within Westerwaldkreis district
- Interactive map of Zehnhausen bei Rennerod
- Location within Germany Location within Rhineland-Palatinate
- Coordinates: 50°38′50″N 8°3′35″E
- Country: Germany
- State: Rhineland-Palatinate
- District: Westerwaldkreis
- Municipal assoc.: Rennerod

Government
  - Mayor (2019–24): Heinz-Joachim Benner

Area
  - Total: 2.96 km^{2} (1.14 sq mi)
- Elevation: 540 m (1,770 ft)

Population (2025-12-31)
  - Total: 367
  - Density: 124/km^{2} (321/sq mi)
- Time zone: UTC+01:00 (CET)
  - Summer (DST): UTC+02:00 (CEST)
- Postal codes: 56477
- Dialling codes: 02664
- Vehicle registration: WW
- Website: www.rennerod.de

Zehnhausen bei Rennerod is an Ortsgemeinde – a community belonging to a Verbandsgemeinde – in the Westerwaldkreis in Rhineland-Palatinate, Germany. It is one of two communities named Zehnhausen in the Westerwaldkreis, the other being Zehnhausen bei Wallmerod.

== Geography ==
Zehnhausen lies on the basalt knoll of the High Westerwald on an average elevation of more than 530 m above sea level. The community lies right on Bundesstraße 54, the “Mainz Road”, a mediaeval trade road. It comes from Mainz and leads to Siegen. The road, however, had hardly any influence on the community's development. Zehnhausen bei Rennerod belongs to the Verbandsgemeinde of Rennerod, a kind of collective municipality. Its seat is in the like-named town.

== History ==
The placename with the ending –hausen would seem to indicate that the community arose at the time of the greatest wave of Frankish settlement in the Westerwald from the 6th century to the 11th.

Zehnhausen has for uncounted years belonged to the parish of Emmerichenhain, which since the Reformation has been Evangelical.

For centuries the community belonged to the House of Nassau.

In 1335, Zehnhausen had its first documentary mention, when the community was called Zhenhusen. It is believed that in the field known as Altzehnhausen – alt is German for “old” – which lies roughly 1.2 km southwest of today's community, is where the community's core was once to be found. Wall remains unearthed there, however, might have been field walls. The place once known as Königshub – or about 1440 Konigshuse – roughly 1 km to the north, formed along with Zehnhausen one community until 1738. The field name Kindschue still shows today where the now forsaken village lay.

In 1635 there were only two utterly impoverished households left in Zehnhausen, and in 1643 there were 16 inhabitants. In the summer of 1658, sixteen houses burnt to the ground within one hour. In 1660, 36 people in 6 families were counted in the community; in 1782 it was 169, and in 1807, 33 families with all together 168 people lived in the community. In 1736, a branch school was first mentioned and in 1784, the first schoolhouse of the community's own was built. This schoolhouse was used until the late 1960s. All eight grades were taught in one classroom.

In June 1796, the inhabitants fled Zehnhausen for Nenderoth into the Kreuzberg Forest by way of Johannisburg before advancing French soldiers, who were moving forth from Hachenburg into the Westerwald to Emmerichenhain. There, a few children were even born.

== Politics ==
The municipal council is made up of 8 council members who were elected in a majority vote in a municipal election on 13 June 2004.

== Economy and infrastructure ==
Trade and tourism offer only a handful of jobs. Agriculture is nowadays only practised as a sideline. As always, most working people commute to jobs in the surrounding area.

=== Village life ===
In 1964, the community won a silver medal in the special class in the contest Unser Dorf soll schöner werden (“Our village ought to be lovelier”). The community has a singing club and a sport club (SV Adler) with its own sporting ground and sport hall. For children, a playground was built back in the 1960s. In the Dorfgemeinschaftshaus (“village community house”), the former bakehouse, is also found the fire brigade house. Yearly, a village and well festival is held. Newly laid out hiking paths enhance the community's attractiveness.

=== Transport ===
Zehnhausen is connected to the public transport through the local bus lines 484, 487, 957, 972 and N47, it's located in the transport association Verkehrsverbund Rhein-Mosel (VRM), in the zone number 457.

Right near the community, Bundesstraßen 54, linking Limburg an der Lahn with Siegen, and 414, leading from Hohenroth to Hachenburg, cross each other. The nearest Autobahn interchange is Herborn on the A 45 (Dortmund–Aschaffenburg), some 18 km away.

The nearest train station is Westerburg station at the Limburg–Altenkirchen railway, 16 kilometers far from Zehnhausen, the nearest long distances train station is the railway station at Montabaur on the Cologne-Frankfurt high-speed rail line.
