= Hattert =

- Municipality
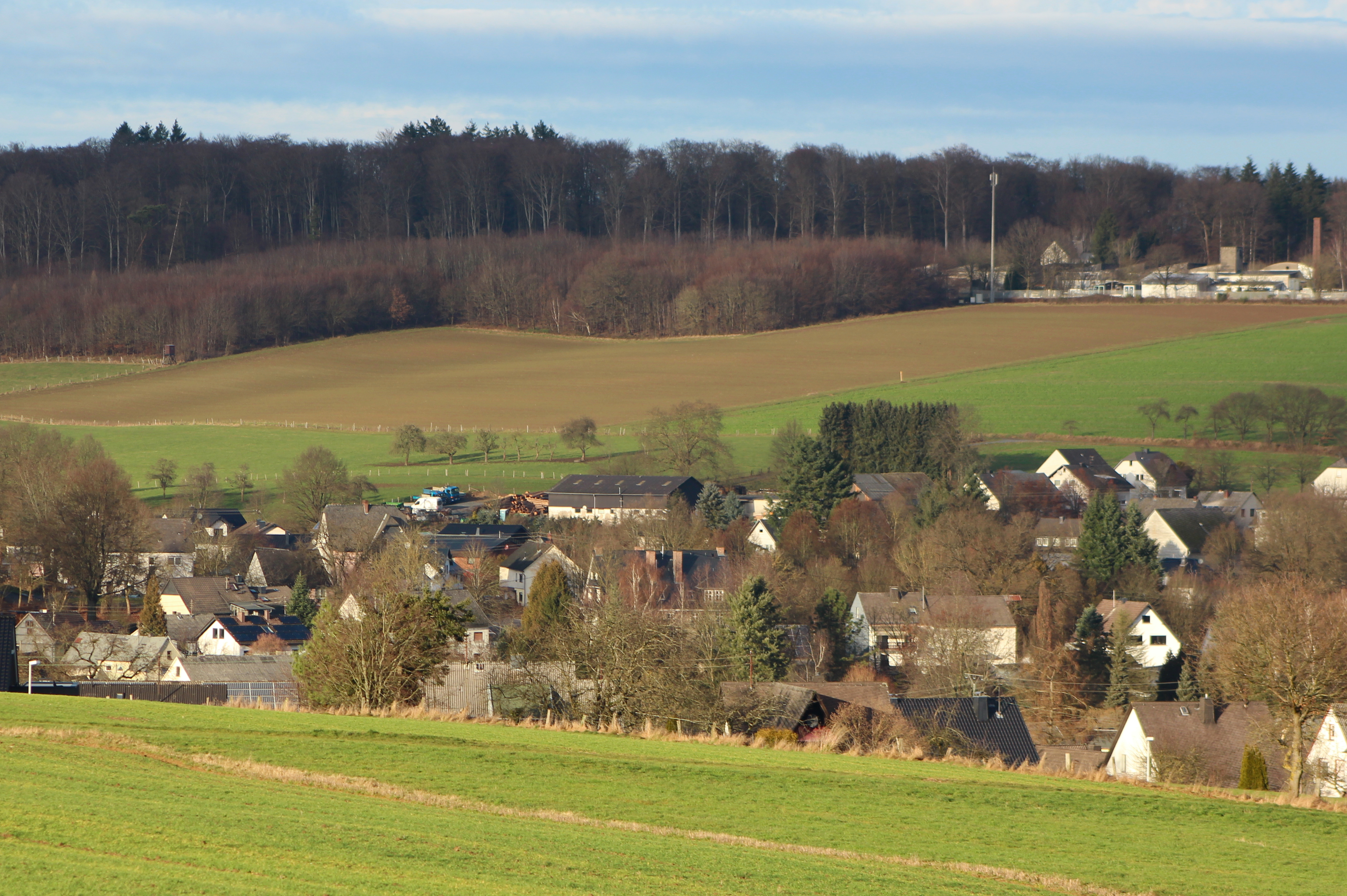

- Coat of arms

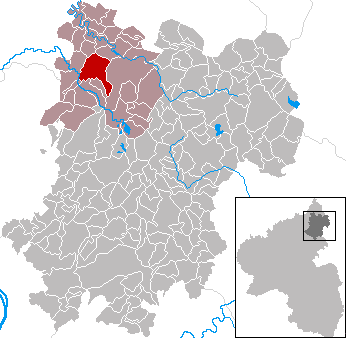
- Location of Hattert within Westerwaldkreis district
- Interactive map of Hattert
- Location within Germany Location within Rhineland-Palatinate
- Coordinates: 50°40′02″N 7°46′09″E
- Country: Germany
- State: Rhineland-Palatinate
- District: Westerwaldkreis
- Municipal assoc.: Hachenburg
- Subdivisions: 5

Government
  - Mayor (2023–24): Peter Enders (SPD)

Area
  - Total: 11.52 km^{2} (4.45 sq mi)
- Elevation: 280 m (920 ft)

Population (2025-12-31)
  - Total: 1,761
  - Density: 152.9/km^{2} (395.9/sq mi)
- Time zone: UTC+01:00 (CET)
  - Summer (DST): UTC+02:00 (CEST)
- Postal codes: 57644
- Dialling codes: 02662
- Vehicle registration: WW
- Website: www.hachenburg-vg.de

Hattert (German pronunciation: [ˈhatɐt]) is an Ortsgemeinde – a community belonging to a Verbandsgemeinde – in the Westerwaldkreis in Rhineland-Palatinate, Germany. It is the biggest Ortsgemeinde in the Verbandsgemeinde of Hachenburg, a kind of collective municipality.

== Geography ==
=== Location ===
Hattert lies between Hachenburg and Altenkirchen, on the so-called Altenkirchen Plateau (Altenkirchener Hochebene) in the “Further” Westerwald (Vorderwesterwald). The hollow called the Hatterter Grund stretches from an elevation of 265 m up to 349 m. The Rothenbach, which rises in Gehlert, flows through the Hatterter Grund. In Oberhattert it is fed by the Selbach and in Niederhattert by the Aggerbach, emptying into the Wied as the Hatterter Bach between Winkelbach and Hanwerth. Along the edge of the Hatterter Grund run Bundesstraßen 413 and 414, which meet near Hachenburg.

=== Constituent communities ===
Hattert's Ortsteile are Oberhattert, Mittelhattert, Niederhattert, Laad and Hütte.

== History ==
=== Establishment ===
With the help of Hattert's historical names it is assumed that the community had already arisen by the 11th century. It is furthermore assumed that the settlement of Hattenrode grew out of a one-farm Frankish settlement. This part of Hattert later bore the field name Auf dem Frankenhof, and is still known as such by today's inhabitants.

From 1180, the Count of Sayn held sway over the Hatterter Grund. The community's first documentary mention has been dated to 13 December 1373 (the original document is found in the Hessian Hauptstaatsarchiv in Wiesbaden under the Akten-Nummer 74/484). As with most of the surrounding places, the name, or its historical forerunner, suggests a clearing settlement for which patches of forest were cleared of trees. In the Hatterter Grund arose the communities of Oberhattert, Mittelhattert, Niederhattert, Laad and Hütte.

The Hatterter Grund belonged to the parochial centres of Kroppach and Altstadt (the latter now an outlying centre of Hachenburg), whose common boundary was the Rothenbach. Thus, some of the little places here were assigned to Kroppach and others to Altstadt.

Sometime before 1402 arose the lesser noble name Nail von Hattenrode (also Nayl or Nayll), to whose estate the mill in the Hatterter Grund belonged as of 1427. The family's last representative, Wilhelm von Hattenrode, died about 1523, whereafter the Hatteroth (later Sophiental) Estate underwent changing ownership arrangements.

Overlords in the whole area were the Counts of Sayn, until 1799 when Sayn-Hachenburg passed to Nassau-Weilburg. From 1806 the Hatterter Grund belonged to the Duchy of Nassau through the founding of the Confederation of the Rhine.

In 1817 came the amalgamation of Niederhattert and Laad into one community. The same was done with Mittelhattert and Hütte, with the resulting bigger community swelling further in 1818 with the addition of the Sophiental Estate to its municipal area.

In 1866, the Duchy of Nassau was annexed by Prussia in the wake of the Austro-Prussian War, soon after which – indeed the next year – the communities in the Hatterter Grund were assigned to the Oberwesterwaldkreis (district), whose seat was in Marienberg.

As of 1946, these places belonged to Rhineland-Palatinate and the Regierungsbezirk of Montabaur, and then later, between 1968 and 2000 to the Regierungsbezirk of Koblenz. In 1969, the villages of Niederhattert with Laad, Mittelhattert with Hütte and Oberhattert were then amalgamated with each other to create what has been ever since then the biggest community in the Verbandsgemeinde of Hachenburg.

=== Railway ===
==== Limburg - Altenkirchen railway ====
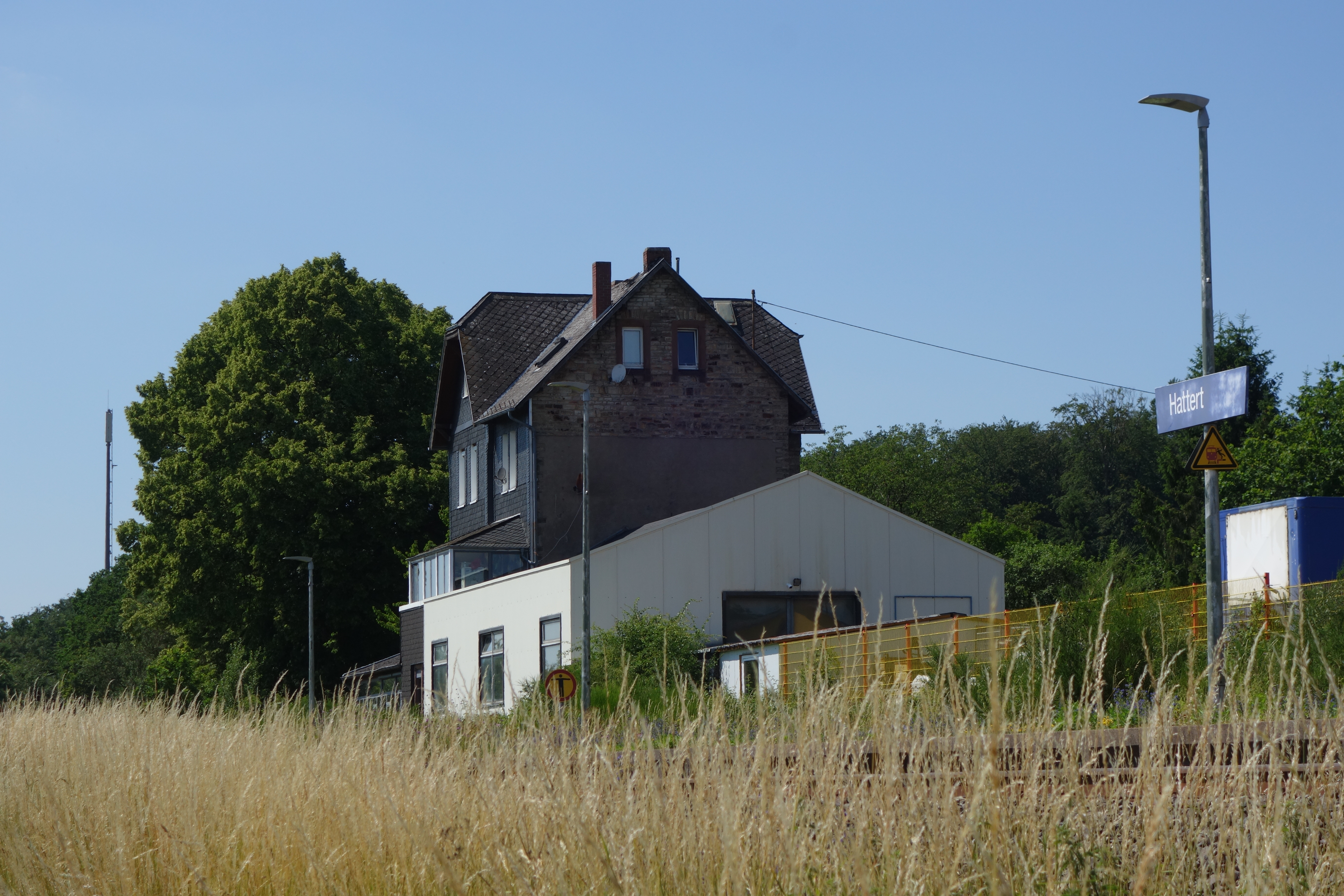
Former railway station building

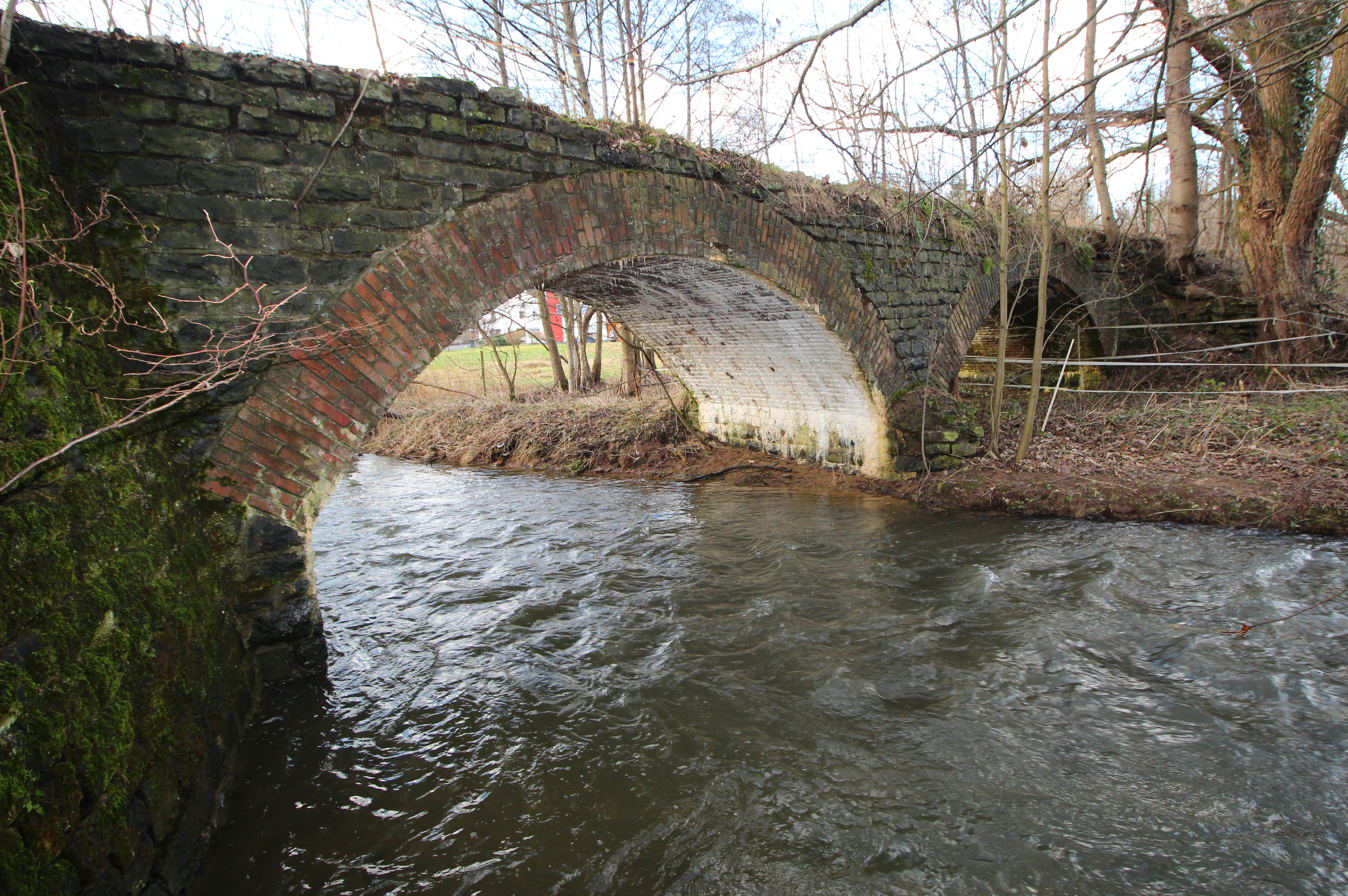
The bridge of the former Selters - Hachenburg narrow gauge railway in Hattert

On 1 April 1885, the Altenkirchen-Hachenburg stretch of railway, the Oberwesterwaldbahn, was opened with a station at Hattert, whose building time can nevertheless no longer be exactly dated. The first plans for such a railway were put forth as early as 1842, and the last stretch of the line, from Altenkirchen to Au/Sieg began running on 1 May 1887. The former Oberwesterwaldbahn railway station is now a request stop, and the station building is now privately owned.

Current operation is through the line RB90, Westerwald-Sieg-Bahn (Limburg Lahn - Diez Ost - Westerburg - Hachenburg - Altenkirchen - Au (Sieg) - Wissen (Sieg) - Betzdorf (Sieg) -Siegen.

Hattert is located in the area of the transport association Verkehrsverbund Rhein-Mosel, zone 450.

==== Selters - Hachenburg railway ====
By 1 August 1901, a narrow-gauge railway (Kleinbahn-AG Selters-Hachenburg) linked Hachenburg and Selters. The alignment led right through the Hatterter Grund, and both Niederhattert and Oberhattert had halts at their disposal. In 1950, dismantling work began on the narrow-gauge railway. The old trackbed can still be seen now only in a few spots in Hattert.

=== Schools ===
In 1820, both Oberhattert and Niederhattert got their own school buildings. With the other one in Hütte, which can no longer be reliably dated, the Hatterter Grund had three school buildings all together. The school in Oberhattert was, after comprehensive repairs already held to have become unfit for use in 1887, but new building or a conversion could not be done owing to a lack of money and differences of opinion among those responsible. Only on 3 October 1911 was a new school building finished in Oberhattert and the old one torn down.

In the 1960s, schooling within Hattert ended altogether. Since then, schoolchildren have been going to the primary school in Müschenbach, while secondary-level students have been going to the Hauptschule and Realschule in Hachenburg as well as to the private Gymnasium run by the Marienstatt Abbey.

=== Church ===
In 1940, a Catholic branch church was built in Oberhattert, which was expanded to a chapel in 1948 and newly built after a fire in 1996. In 1957 came the parish church Maria Königin, which was built on the same lot, as well as the Hattert-Merkelbach rectorate.

On 1 January 2007, the parishes of Hachenburg and Hattert-Merkelbach were merged to form the parish of St. Marien Hachenburg-Hattert. The parish church since then has been Maria Himmelfahrt in Hachenburg, while Maria Königin in Hattert is now a branch church.

=== Coat of arms ===
The community's arms are those formerly borne by the lesser noble family of Nayl, whose members bore the title Denß Monhard Nayl von Hatterode (see History). The nails refer to the name “Nayl”. One spelling of the family's name, namely “Nail”, is the same as the English word. The German word is, however, Nagel.

== People ==
Thomas Denter (born 1936), recipient of the Order of Merit of the Federal Republic of Germany (1996) and of the Order of Merit of Rhineland-Palatinate (2008) as well as former abbott of the Marienstatt Cistercian Abbey.

== Population development ==
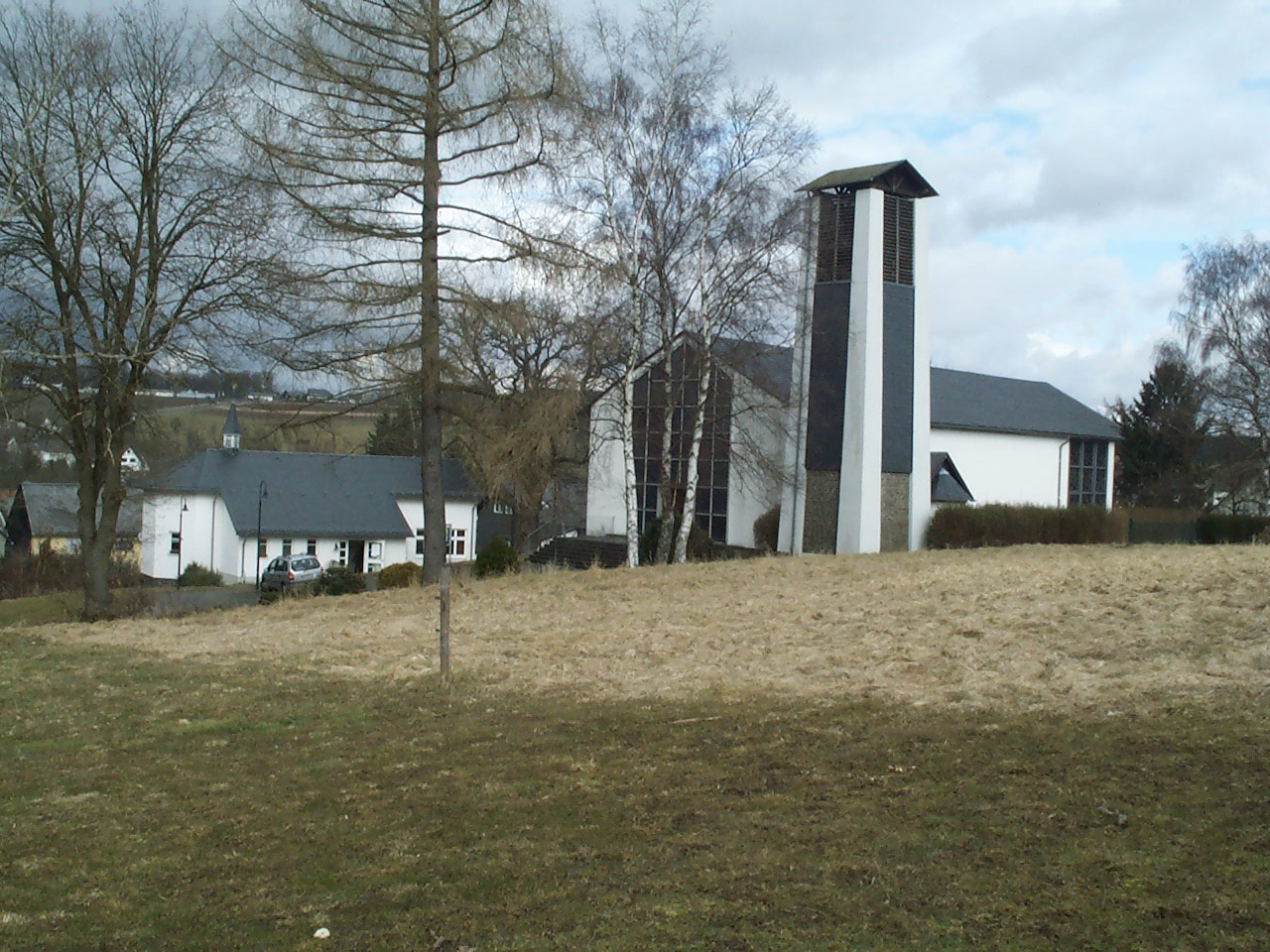
The church building with the chapel. Above the chapel's belltower, the railway station may be seen in the background.

Year	Population
1760	259
1793	558
1843	670
1888	689
1893	768
1933	1200
1956	1314
1975	1751
1988	1732
2003	1756
2004	1847
2005	1815
2013	1740

== Infrastructure ==
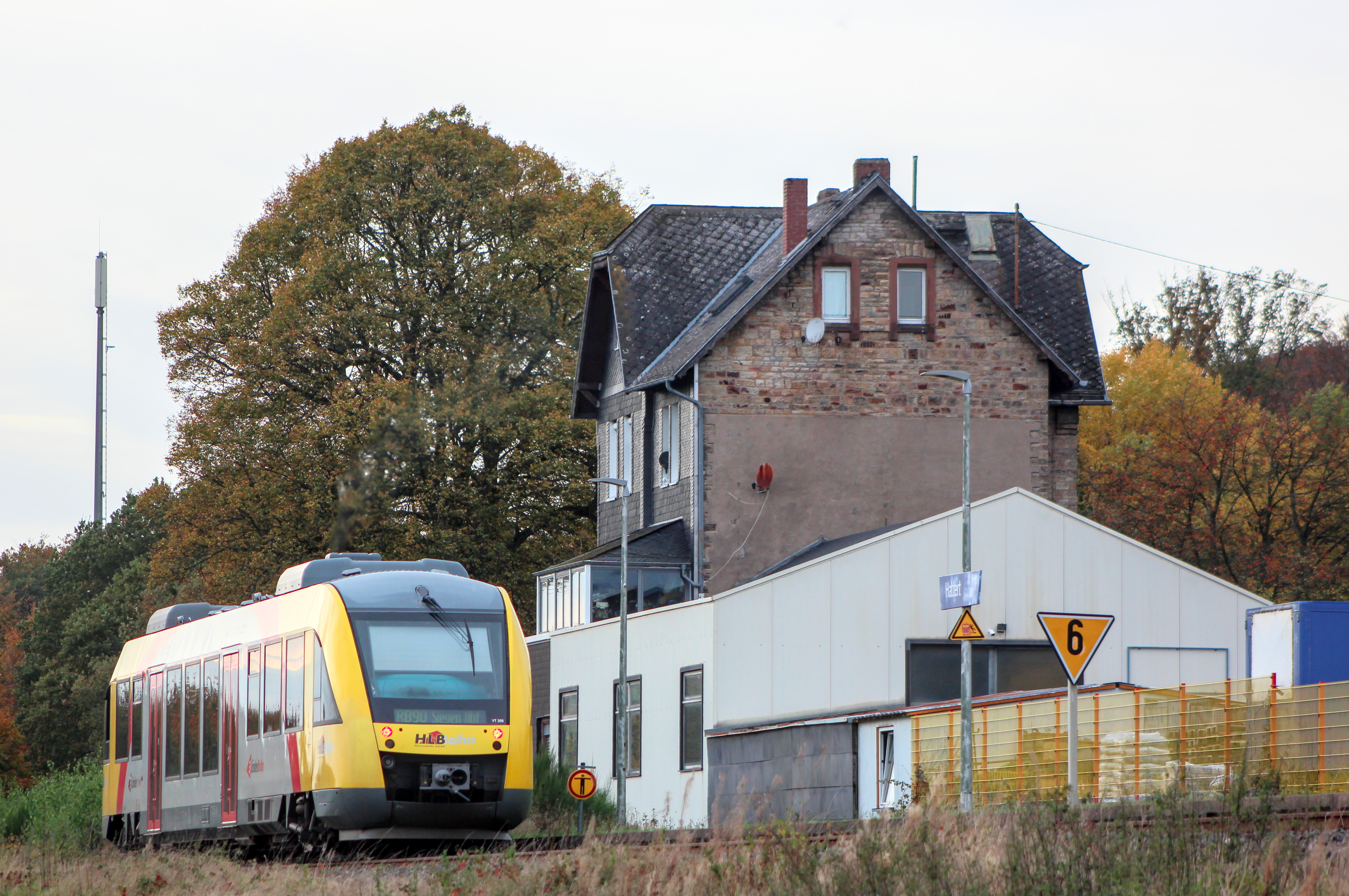
Hattert stop with RB90 train

Hattert was connected to the Selters-Hachenburg narrow gauge railway, which has been deconstructed. The train stop Hattert is located between Hattert and the neighbored Müschenbach at the Limburg-Altenkirchen railway and served by local train line RB90 of DreiLänderBahn, a section of Hessische Landesbahn (HLB) from Limburg via Diez Ost, Westerburg, Hachenburg, Altenkirchen, Au (Sieg) and Wissen to Siegen. The bus lines 408, 415 and 417 connect Hattert to the public bus transport. The village is located in the zones 450 ans 451 of the transport association VRM.

== Notable people ==
Thomas Denter (born 1936), recipient of the Order of Merit of the Federal Republic of Germany (1996) and of the Order of Merit of Rhineland-Palatinate (2008) as well as former abbott of the Marienstatt Cistercian Abbey.
