= Müschenbach =

- Municipality
- Coat of arms

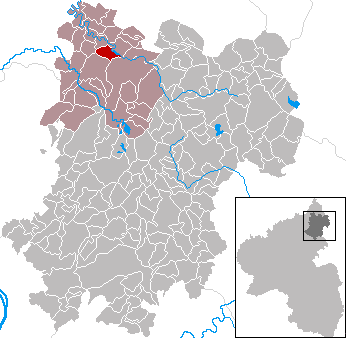
- Location of Müschenbach within Westerwaldkreis district
- Interactive map of Müschenbach
- Location within Germany Location within Rhineland-Palatinate
- Coordinates: 50°40′57″N 7°47′4″E
- Country: Germany
- State: Rhineland-Palatinate
- District: Westerwaldkreis
- Municipal assoc.: Hachenburg

Government
  - Mayor (2019–24): Birgitta Käckermann

Area
  - Total: 3.50 km^{2} (1.35 sq mi)
- Elevation: 336 m (1,102 ft)

Population (2025-12-31)
  - Total: 967
  - Density: 276/km^{2} (716/sq mi)
- Time zone: UTC+01:00 (CET)
  - Summer (DST): UTC+02:00 (CEST)
- Postal codes: 57629
- Dialling codes: 02662
- Vehicle registration: WW
- Website: www.hachenburg-vg.de

Müschenbach is an Ortsgemeinde – a community belonging to a Verbandsgemeinde – in the Westerwaldkreis in Rhineland-Palatinate, Germany.

== Geography ==
Müschenbach lies 3 km from Hachenburg at the “entrance” to the Kroppach Switzerland (Kroppacher Schweiz). Hiking paths lead into the nearby valley of the river Nister and to the Marienstatt Monastery.

== History ==
In 1359, Müschenbach had its first documentary mention.

== Politics ==
The municipal council is made up of 17 council members, including the extraofficial mayor (Bürgermeister), who were elected in a majority vote in a municipal election on 13 June 2004.

== Regular events ==
The yearly kermis, the Brunnenfest (“Well Festival”) and the Carnival with its parade are the community's main events alongside the Meilerfest (“Charcoal Kiln Festival”) with a charcoal kiln and the attendant charcoal makers. This is held every four years.

== Economy and infrastructure ==
In the community are a primary school and a kindergarten. As well, there are a Bürgerhaus (“Citizens’ House”) with a community library, as well as an educational path in the forest and a hiking path network.

=== Transport ===
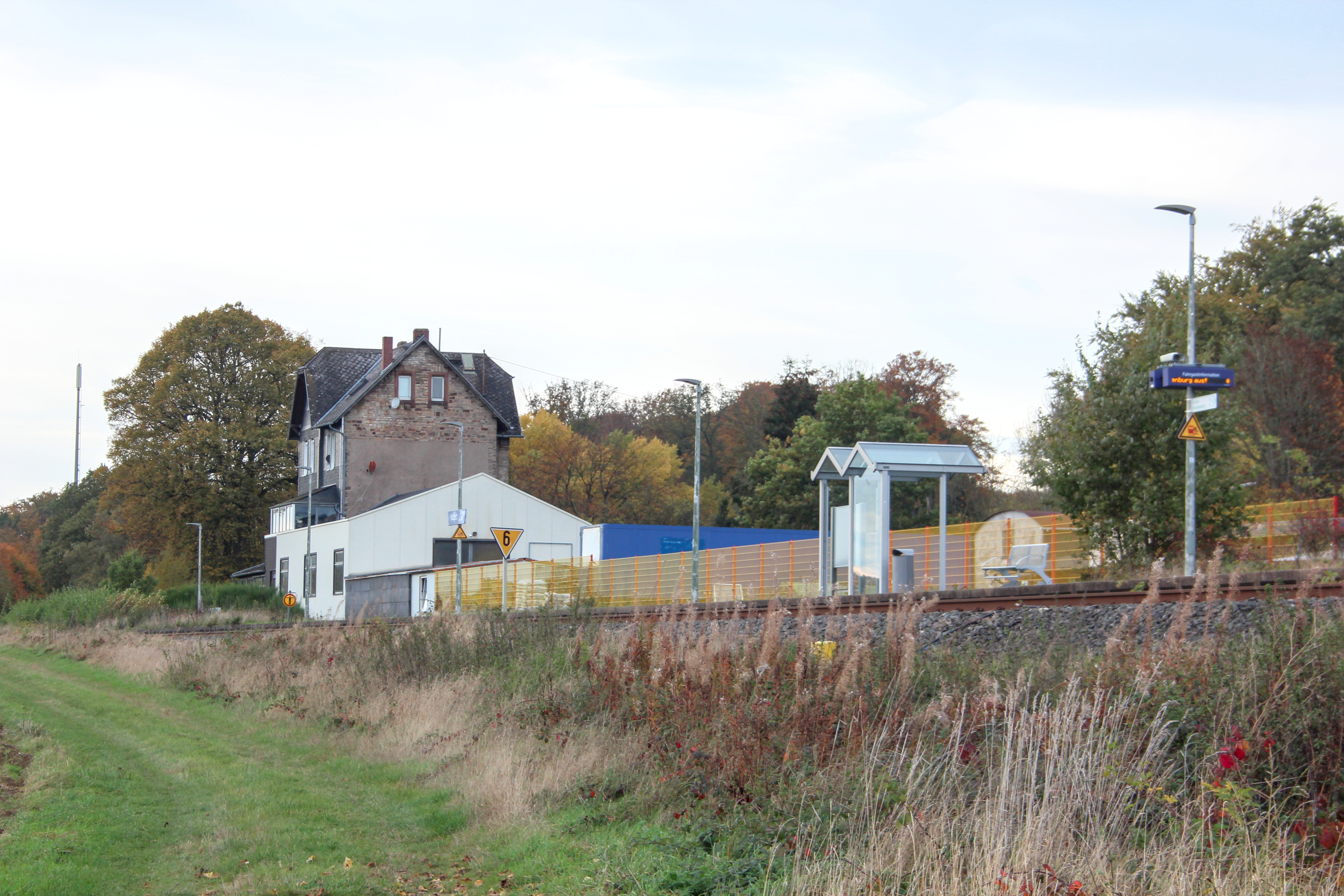
Hattert train stop, view in direction of Müschenbach

Müschenbach is linked to the long-distance road network by Bundesstraße 414. The Autobahn interchanges Mogendorf and Dierdorf on the A 3 (Cologne–Frankfurt) can be reached by Bundesstraßen 8 and 413

The train stop Hattert is located in Hattert, but very close to Müschenbach, it is served by line RB90 (Westerwald-Sieg-railway of DreiLänderBahn, a section of Hessische Landesbahn (HLB) from Limburg to Siegen Hbf) via Diez Ost, Westerburg, Hachenburg, Altenkirchen, Au (Sieg) and Wissen.

In the past the village also was served by the trains of the Selters-Hachenburg narrow gauge railway from Hachenburg via Müschenbach, Hattert and Höchstenbach to Selters, but the service has discontinued and it's tracks deconstructed.

The local bus lines 415 and 417 serve Müschenbach as well.

The village is located in the area of the Verkehrsverbund Rhein-Mosel (VRM), zone 451.

The village is located on Westerwaldsteig, a long distance walking path from Herborn via Rennerod, Westerburg, Bad Marienberg and Hachenburg to Bad Hönningen.
