= Limburg–Altenkirchen railway =

Railway line in Germany

Upper Westerwald Railway
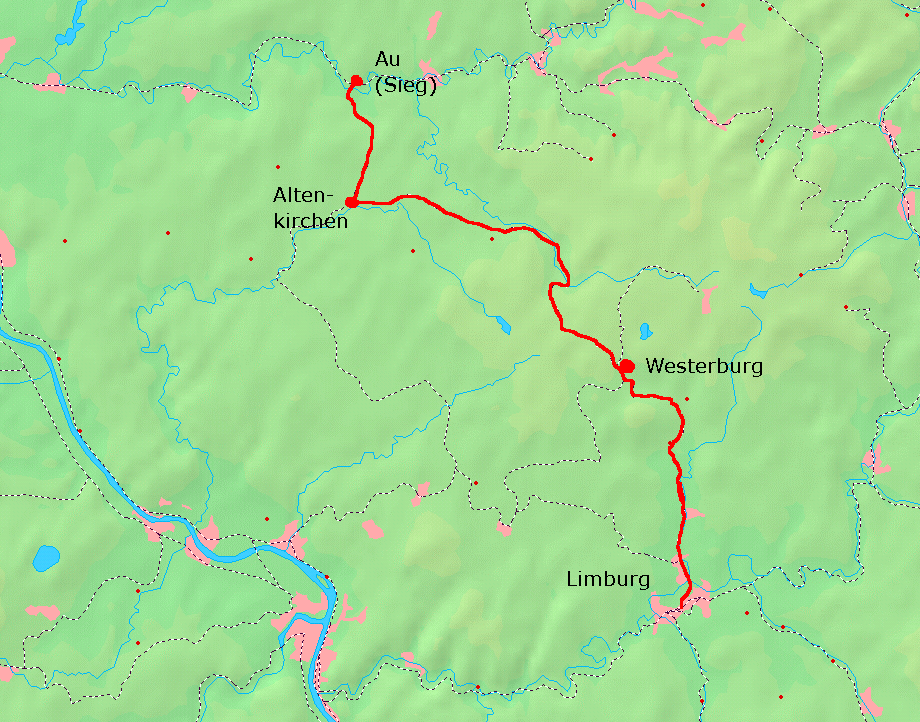

Overview
- Native name: Oberwesterwaldbahn
- Line number: 3730
- Locale: Hesse, Rhineland-Palatinate, Germany
- Termini: Limburg (Lahn); Altenkirchen (Westerw)

Service
- Route number: 461

Technical
- Line length: 65.1 km (40.5 mi)
- Track gauge: 1,435 mm (4 ft 8 1/2 in) standard gauge
- Operating speed: 60 km/h (37.3 mph) (maximum)

The Limburg–Altenkirchen railway is a 65.1 km long branch line from Limburg via Westerburg to Altenkirchen and connecting via the Engers–Au railway to Au through the Westerwald. In German the line is also known as the Oberwesterwaldbahn (Upper Westerwald Railway). It runs through the German states of Hesse and Rhineland-Palatinate.

== Operations and history ==
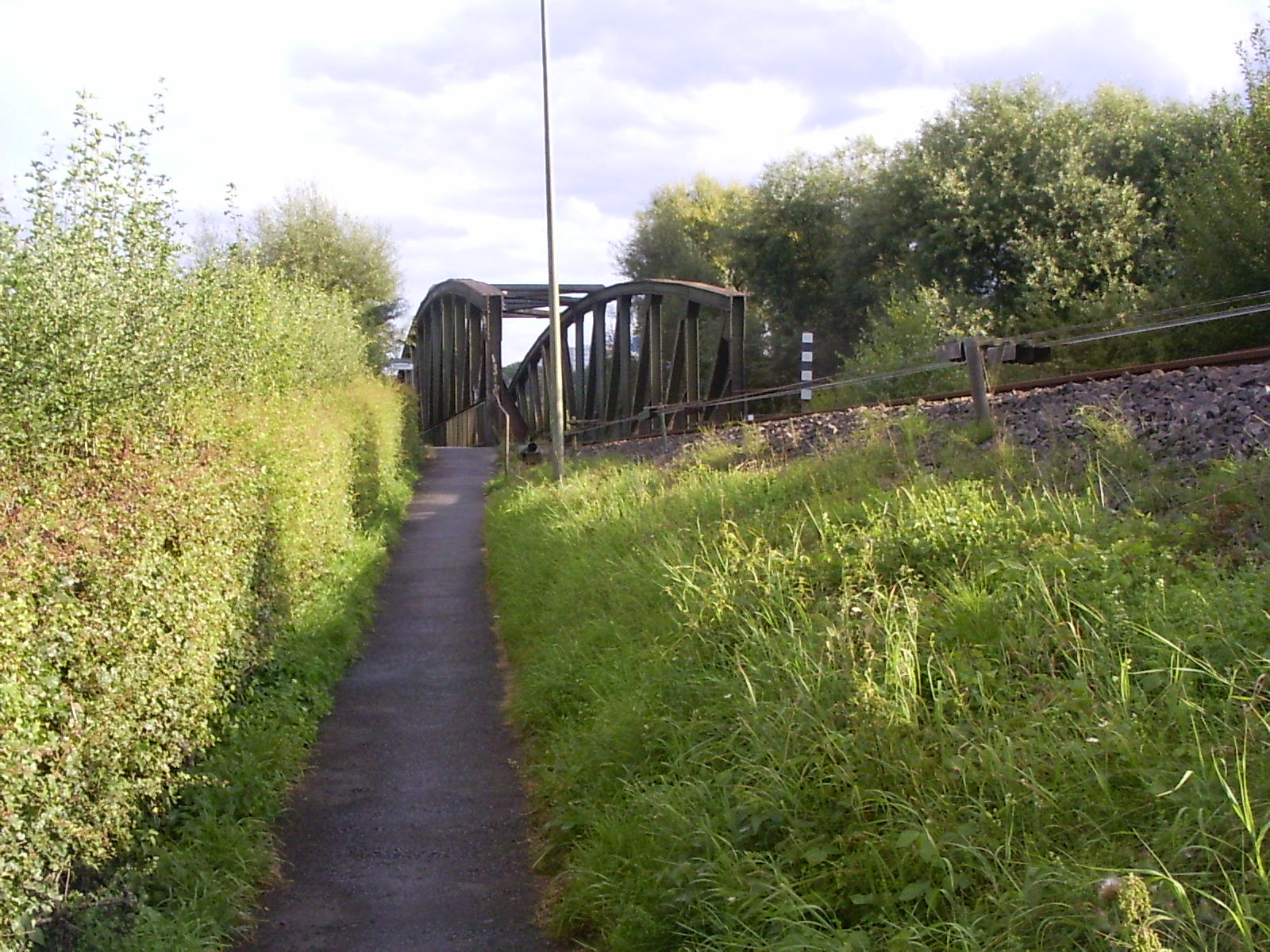
The railway bridge over the river Lahn in Limburg-Staffel includes a pedestrian and cyclers path leading towards Limburg Center and Diez via the "Shirling field"

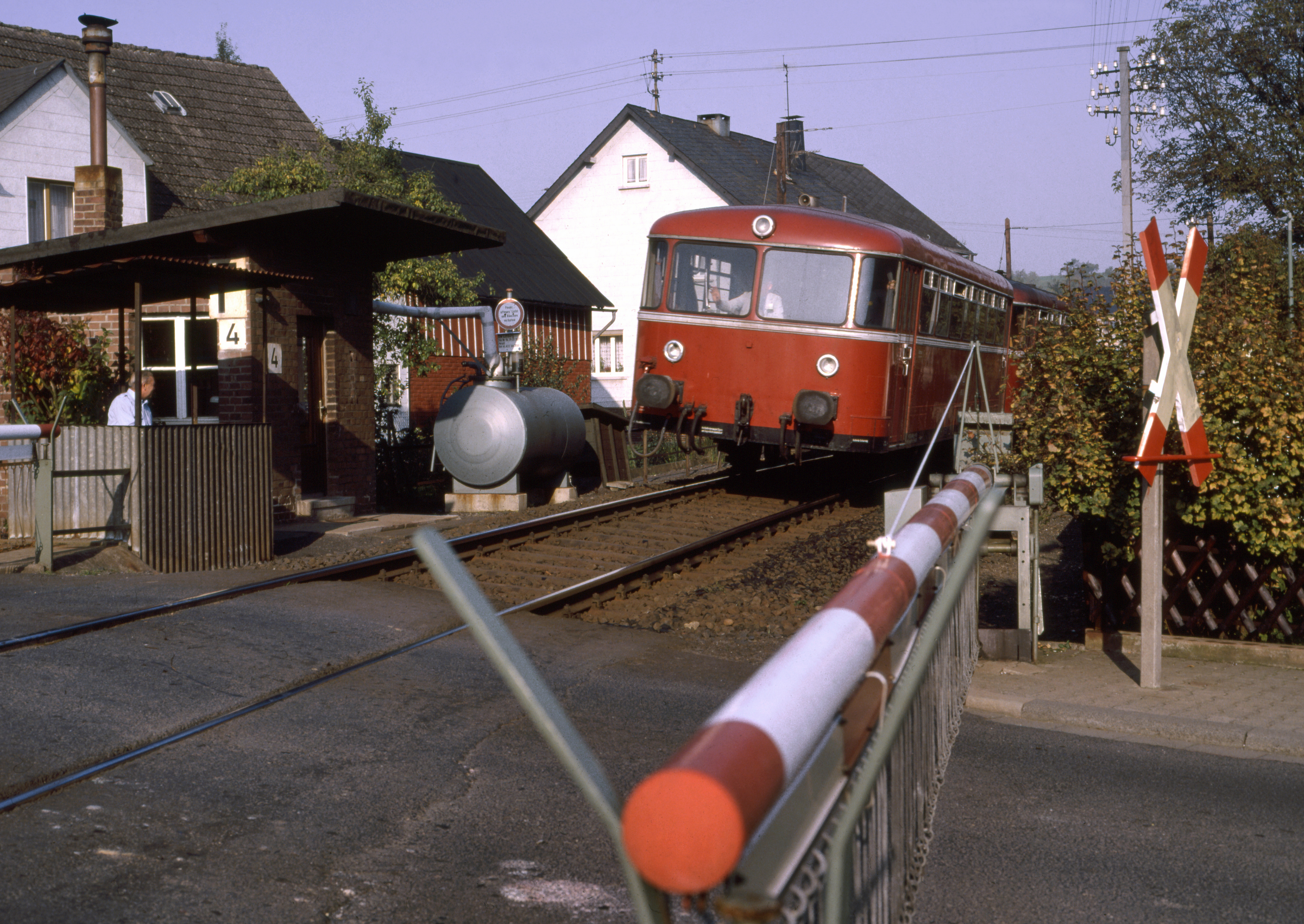
Railroad crossing in Willmenrod

In 1845, there were early plans to build a rail link between Frankfurt and Wiesbaden and Cologne. In 1848/49, a group was formed that advocated the construction of this line through the Westerwald. These plans were initially given some positive attention by the policy makers of Prussia and the Duchy of Nassau, but were rejected in 1853 and a licence was issued to build the East Rhine Railway instead.

In 1861, several local committees in Prussia and Nassau, published a publication supporting the construction of a "Main-Lahn-Sieg Railway", connecting Frankfurt and Cologne via the shortest route and also contributing to the development of mineral deposits (such as basalt and clay) in this area.

On 17 February 1868 the Prussian parliament passed a law that among other things, authorised the construction of a line from Limburg to Hadamar. It was built to plans developed by Moritz Hilf and opened on 1 January 1870.

On 4 December 1873 the Hessian Ludwig Railway (Hessische Ludwigsbahn, HLB) was awarded a licence to continue the line towards Troisdorf on the Sieg via Hachenburg, where a branch line to Wissen was proposed. In 1872, it had been decided to build the Main-Lahn Railway (Main-Lahn-Bahn) from Frankfurt to Limburg via Idstein, Camberg and Eschhofen. The HLB undertook the first survey and preparatory work on the extension towards Troisdorf, but further work was stopped due to financial problems. In May 1879, the Royal Railway Division (KED) of Wiesbaden received permission to continue the construction.

At the end of 1882, construction of the line to Altenkirchen was begun and the section between Altenkirchen and Hachenburg was opened on 1 April 1885. The line between Hachenburg and Hadamar was opened on 1 October 1886.

On 21 May 1883 it was finally decided the build the remaining portion from Altenkirchen to Au. This section was opened on 1 February 1887 and thus connected with the Giessen–Deutz railway towards Cologne.

Section	Opened
Hadamar–Limburg	1 January 1870
Altenkirchen–Hachenburg	1 April 1885
Hachenburg–Hadamar	1 October 1886
Au (Sieg)–Altenkirchen	1 February 1887

The laying of a second track on the original section between Staffel and Limburg was completed on 10 December 1888.

=== Until 1920 ===
Under the Prussian state railways, the line was originally served by class T3 and T8 steam locomotives and from 1912 by class T16 locomotives.

=== Deutsche Reichsbahn period ===
From 1924, Deutsche Reichsbahn operated class T14 locomotives on the line. During the Second World War locomotives of classes 38, 42, 55, 56 and 57 also operated in the Westerwald.

=== Post-war period ===
Apart from the already mentioned classes, Deutsche Bundesbahn operated steam locomotives of classes 50, 52 and 82. The use of steam engines ended on 31 May 1975.

Local passenger services between Limburg and Au were operated mainly with class VT 95 and VT 98 railbuses. After 1989 the line was served by class 628 diesel multiple units. Some services from the 1950s were also operated with accumulator railcars of classes 515 and 517.

From the summer of 1953, two pairs of express services were introduced on the line between Frankfurt and Cologne, which were known in railway jargon and popularly as “hedgerow expresses” (Heckeneilzug). They were the fastest passenger services in the Westerwald. This services were discontinued with the introduction of the timetable of summer 1989. The “hedges expresses” were first operated with class VT 25 diesel multiple units and later by carriages hauled by diesel locomotives of classes V80, V100 and 216. Between the summer of 1977 and the winter of 1991 another pair of express trains also operated between Altenkirchen and Mainz and Wiesbaden.

In 1987, a siding was built for transporting tanks to and from Wäller barracks in Westerburg. This siding was closed with the closure of the base in 2007.

=== 1990s ===
After the privatisation of Deutsche Bahn on 1 January 1994, operations on the line between Limburg and Au were taken over by DB Regio AG. There were still operated with class 628 diesel multiple units as Regionalbahn services.

=== Since 2004 ===
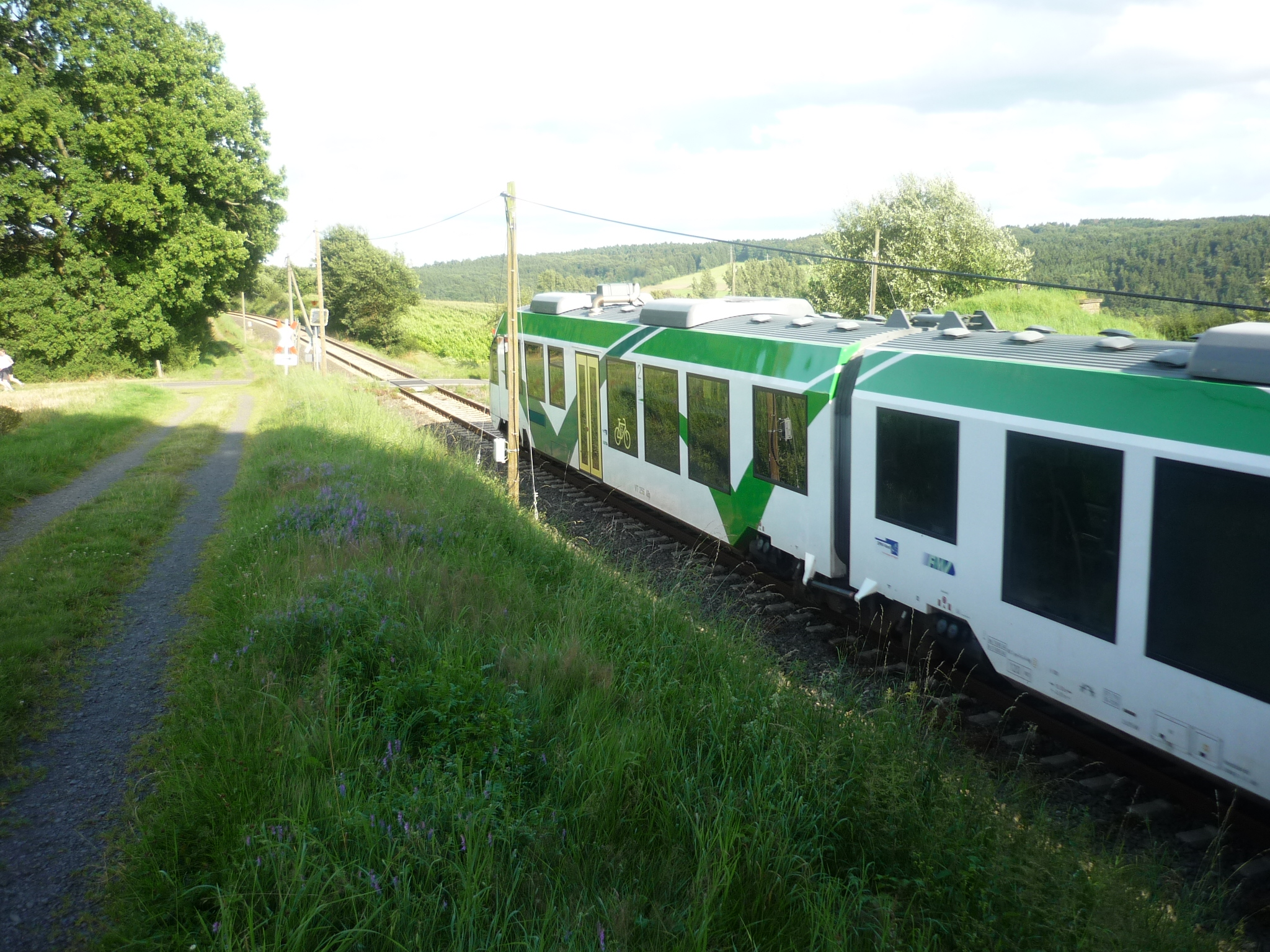
Regionalbahn service near Ingelbach

After the contract for operations was awarded by the Zweckverband Schienenpersonennahverkehr Rheinland-Pfalz Nord (Purpose association for passenger transport association of northern Rhineland-Palatinate), management of operations were taken from 10 January 2003 by the Rhein-Main-Verkehrsverbund (Rhine-Main Transport Association, RMV) and the operation of services on the Limburg–Au route was contracted from 12 December 2004 to vectus Verkehrsgesellschaft.

Trains run from Limburg to Altenkirchen and from there to Au. All passenger service have to stop and reverse in Altenkirchen station, as the line which continues on the other side of the station line to Siershahn is only used for freight services.

On 31 October 2012, the result of a tender for future services was announced. The Hessische Landesbahn (HLB) was awarded the contract for the operation of the network from August 2015 until December 2030, including the RB 90 service (Westerwald-Sieg-Bahn). Since the existing contract with the incumbent operator was due to end in December 2014, HLB agreed to take over operations early. At the timetable change of 14 December 2014, HLB took over operations on the line not only of DreiLänderBahn from DB Regio NRW, but also the operations of the RB 28 and RB 29 services from vectus Verkehrsgesellschaft. Services remained at the old level.

Due to delays in planning, infrastructure measures could not be completed in time for the timetable change in December 2015. Therefore, a transition timetable was implemented, which provides for a break in operations for most trains in Westerburg. In the northern part, which is the responsibility of SPNV Nord and NWL, the trains already ran hourly to Siegen, as provided for in the new timetable concept. In the southern part, which is mostly in the area of responsibility of the RMV, the old timetable still operates, which provides only a two-hourly regular-interval services with some additional services. The breaks that occur in Westerburg often cause waits of 24–39 minutes for the other train, which are very unattractive for passengers.

Specifically, an increase in line speed between Langenhahn and Au (Sieg) was implemented. This involved measures at 40 level crossings, two bridges, and 16 culverts, as well as the reconstruction of Hadamar station, adjustments to the signaling system, and track superstructure improvements. Measures that did not require planning permission were implemented early. The remaining measures suffered considerable delays because applications were submitted incorrectly and new regulations had to be taken into account. The applications for planning approval had to be resubmitted to the Federal Railway Authority in 2019 and underwent an 18-month processing period. A new timetable was introduced with the timetable change in December 2019, which at least on weekdays mitigated the effects of the previous interim timetable. This involved speeding up services every two hours by skipping stops at Büdingen, Enspel, and Rotenhain, allowing direct travel from Siegen to Limburg and back without long waiting times. In return, the split point for trains serving all stops was moved from Westerburg to Altenkirchen. The advantage here was that, at certain times, connections could be made to the intermediate trains to Betzdorf.

In spring 2024, the speed-enhancing measures were completed and the new timetable with hourly services between Siegen and Limburg was put into operation. The start was poor, with significant delays, as smooth train crossings had to be established. Furthermore, for months, services had to be replaced by rail replacement buses due to frequent staff shortages and work on the railway overpass over the Quengelbach in Altenkirchen, the completion of which was also delayed.

Beside the Quengelbach-Bridge in Altenkirchen near Koblenzer Straße, three further briges along the RB90 line from Limburg to Siegen have been renovated which are the Basaltsteinbrücke in Westerburg (2016) and the bridges in Niedererbach (next to Obererbach station) and in Windeck between the stations Au (Sieg) and Geilhausen in 2025.

== Stations ==
=== Limburg (Lahn) ===
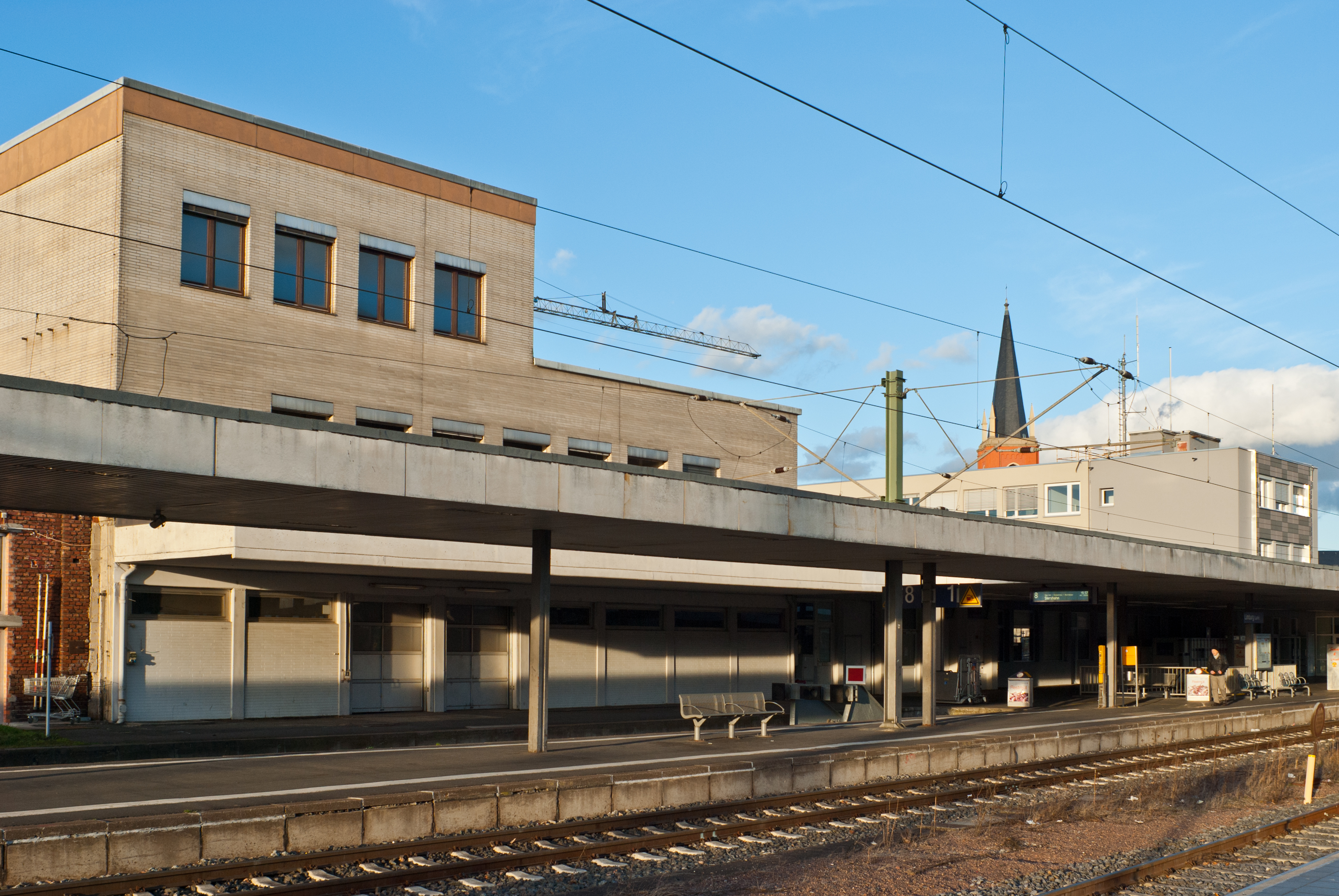
Limburg (Lahn) station, platform no. 8 (back) primarily is used by the trains of the line RB90 running on the Limburg-Altenkirchen railway

Most frequented station around the line and interchange to Koblenz, Frankfurt, Wiesbaden and Gießen.

=== Diez Ost ===
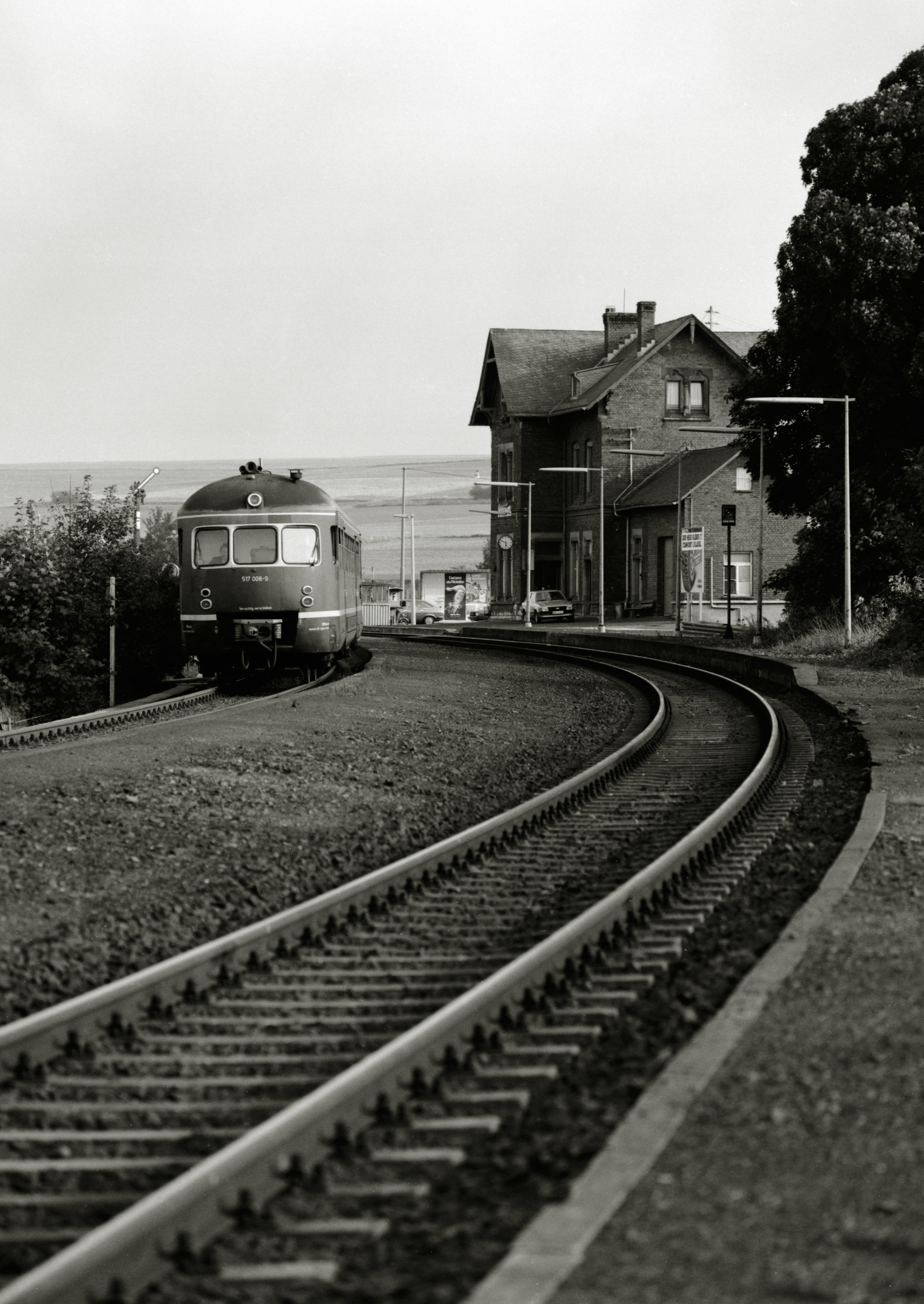
Diez Ost stop

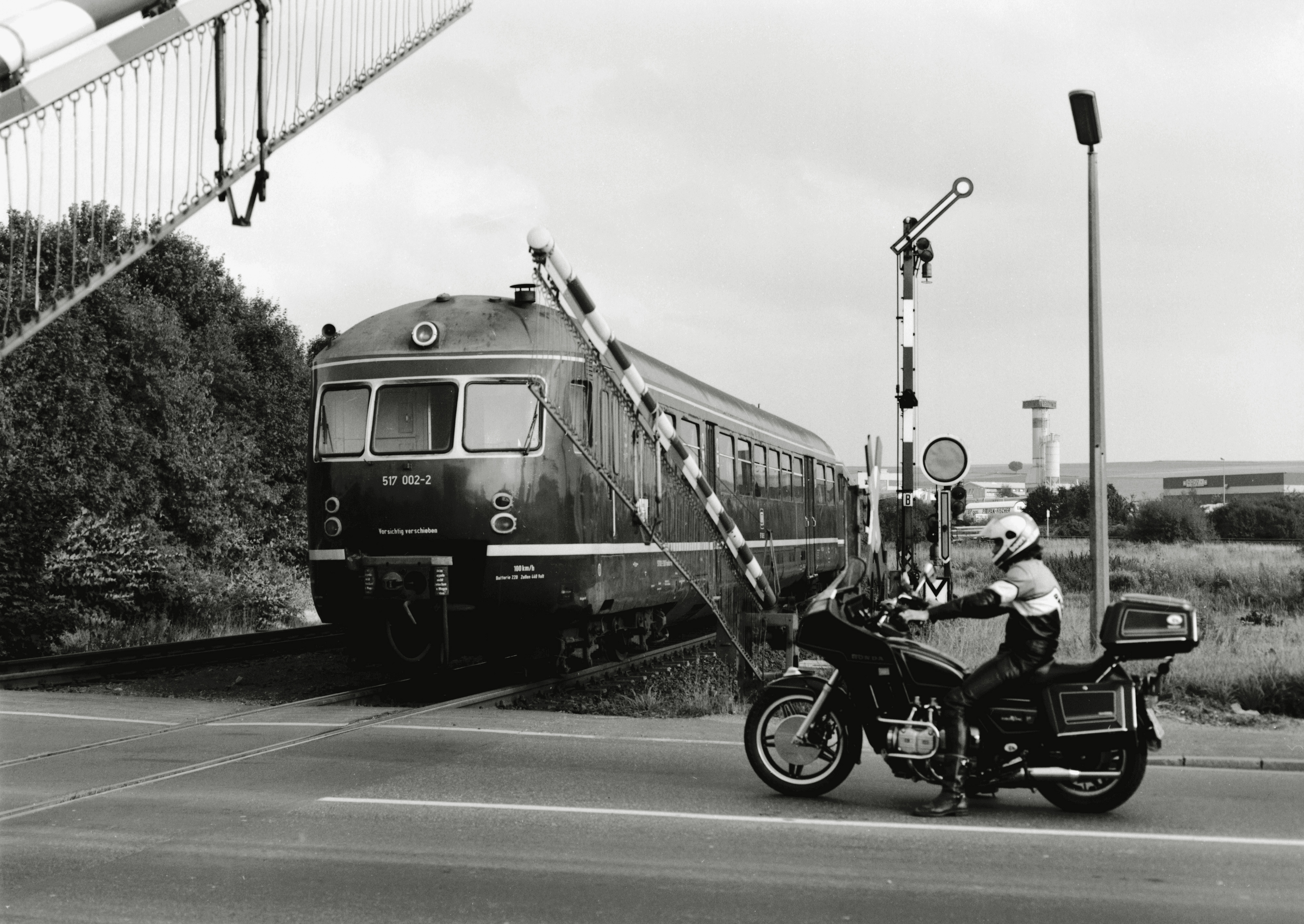
Railroad crossing at Diez Ost station before the bridges have been constructed

Located in the district "Freiendiez" of the small town Diez, in the area around "Kalkstein" this stop also is a fare exception, it is located in the area of the VRM, but by train only accessible coming from the RMV area. Many important components are located around the station, the former military base, the state prison Diez (JVA Diez), ice hall and swimming hall. Located close to the tracks of the Lahntal railway, although there isn't a stop.

=== Staffel ===
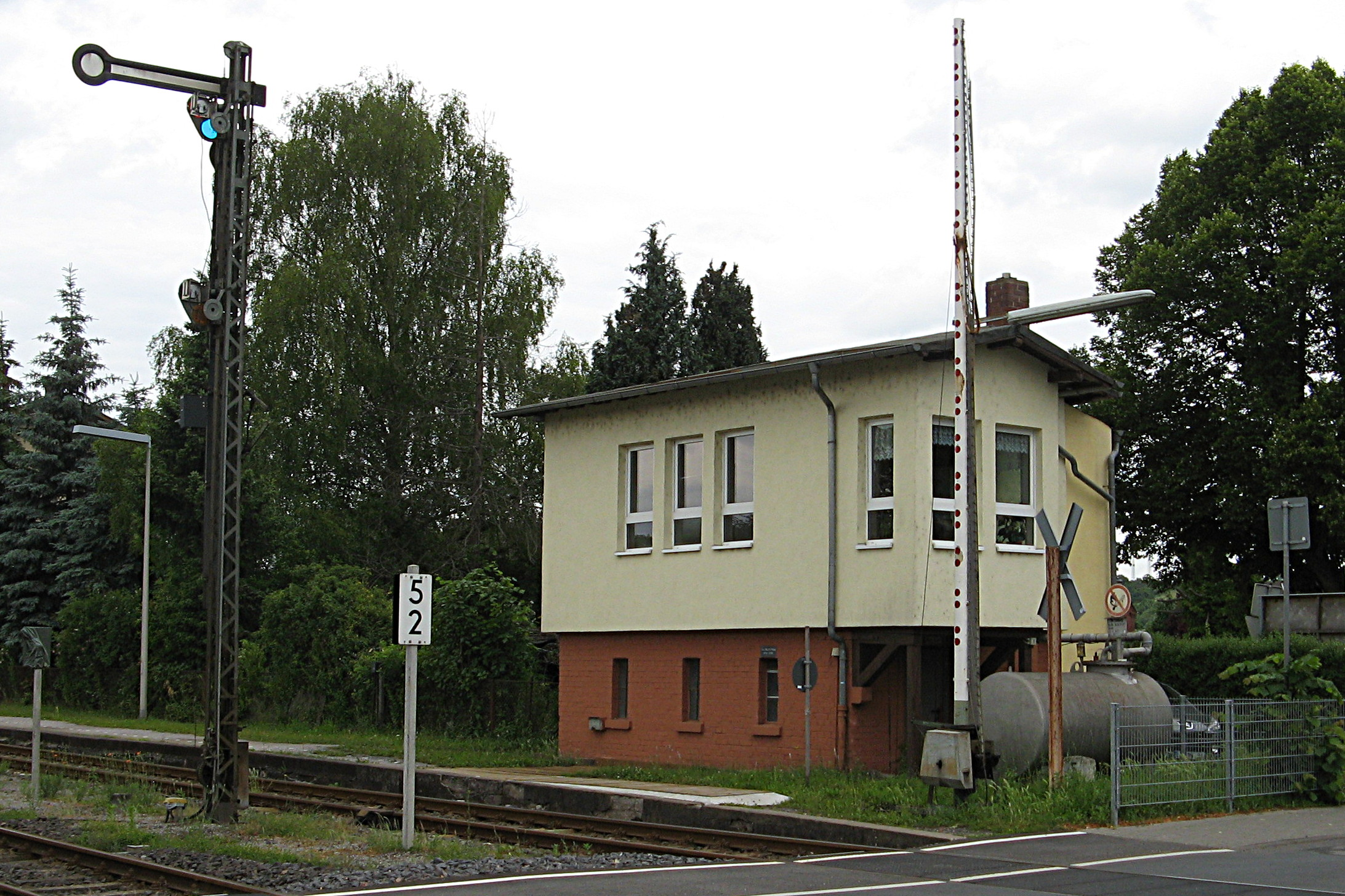
Signal nix at Staffel station next to railroad crossing Koblenzer Straße

Located in district Staffel of the city of Limburg and interchange to the trains of the Staffel-Siershahn railway as well as the local bus service.

=== Elz ===
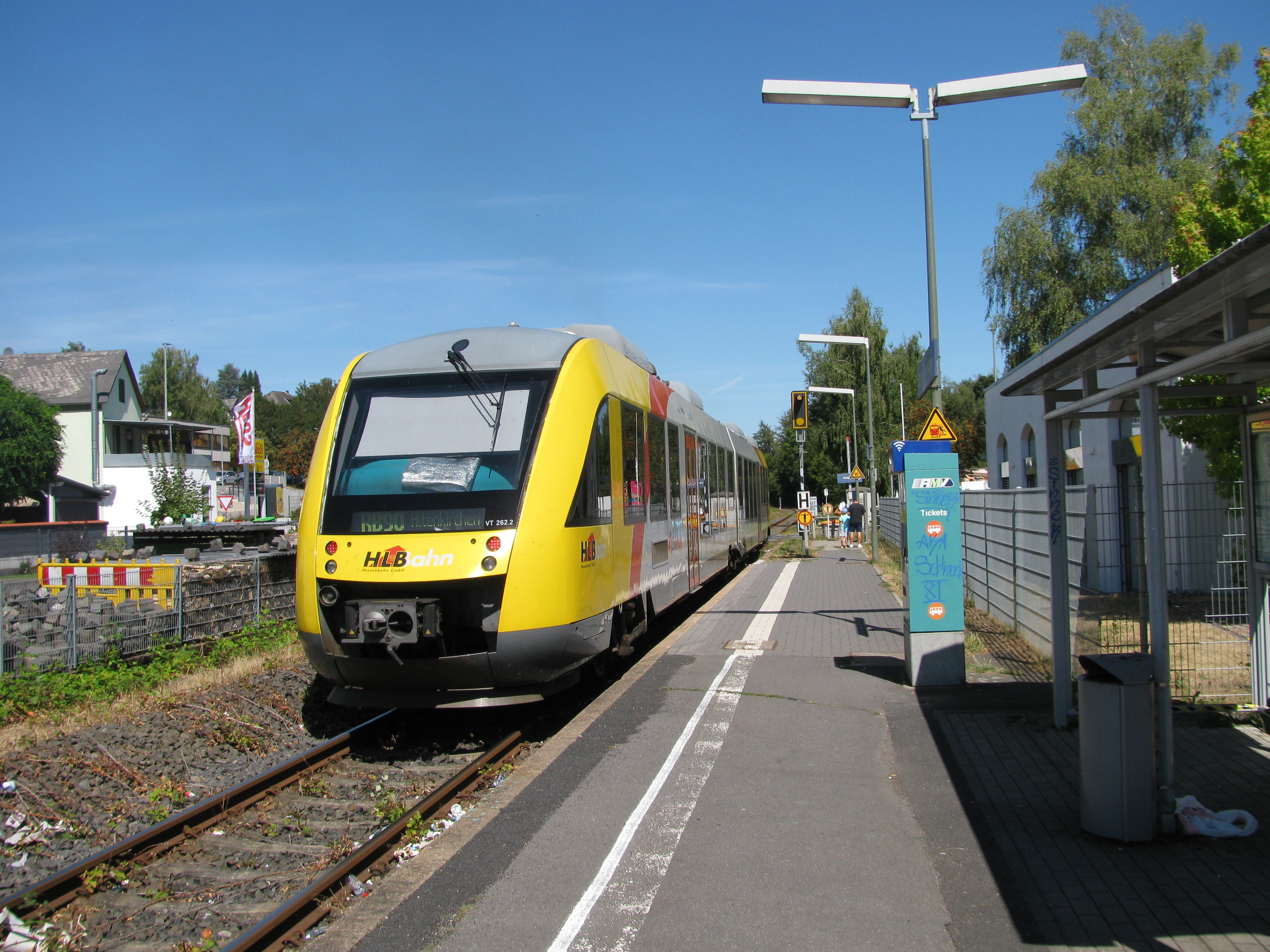
RB90 Elz

One of two accessabilities in Elz to the local train service, the station building is a listed building. In the past a station for passenger as well as fright traffic, nowadays only a station for passenger transport, a goods sheed and also a locomotive sheed were present, the building is under private ownership. Interchange to local busses and park and ride facility.

=== Niederhadamar ===
Simple stop in the district Niederhadamar of the town Hadamar.

=== Hadamar ===
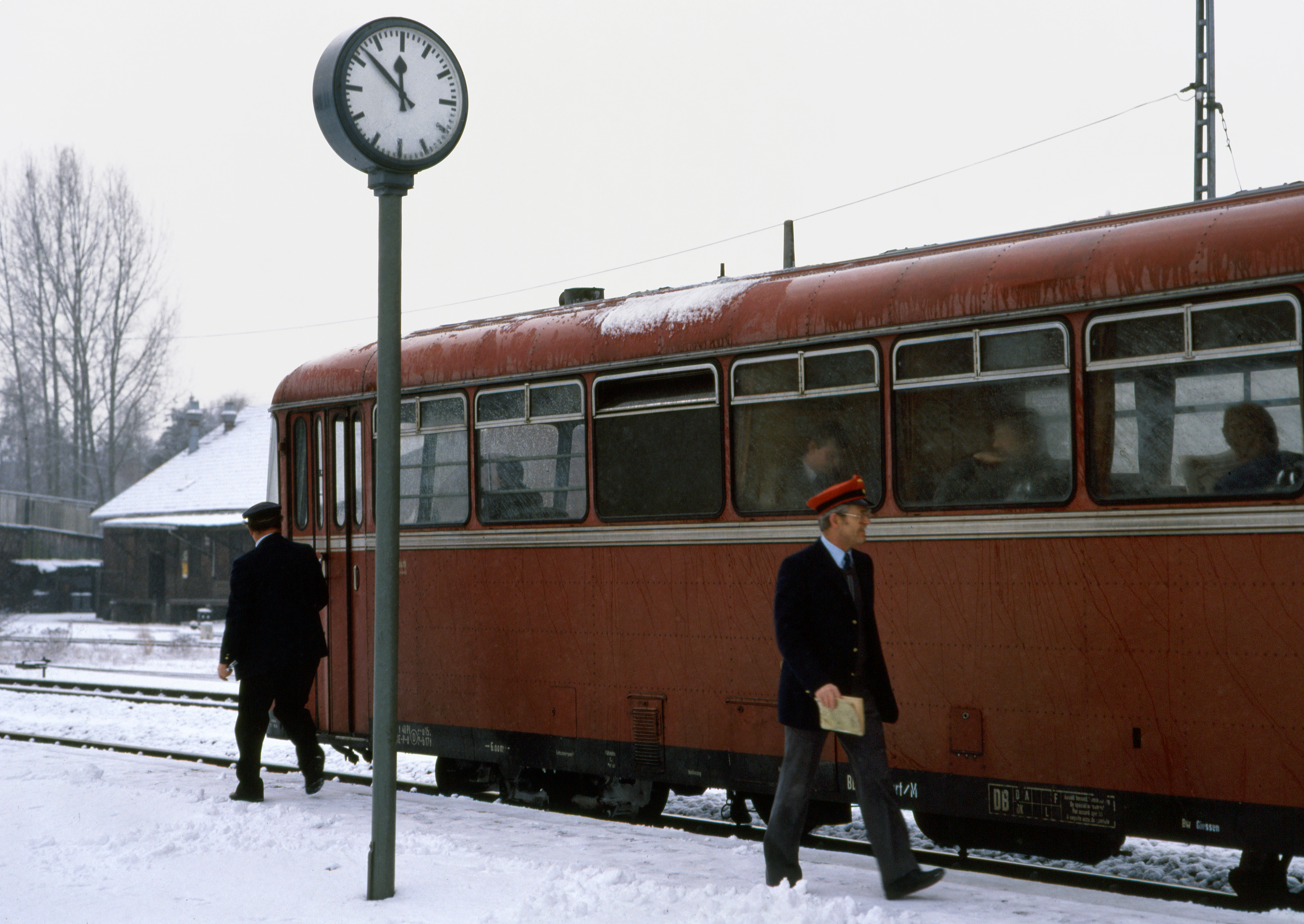
VT98 in Hadamar

A listed building, brick building in the town Hadamar, train crossing possibility, interchange to the local bus service at the main road.

=== Niederzeuzheim ===
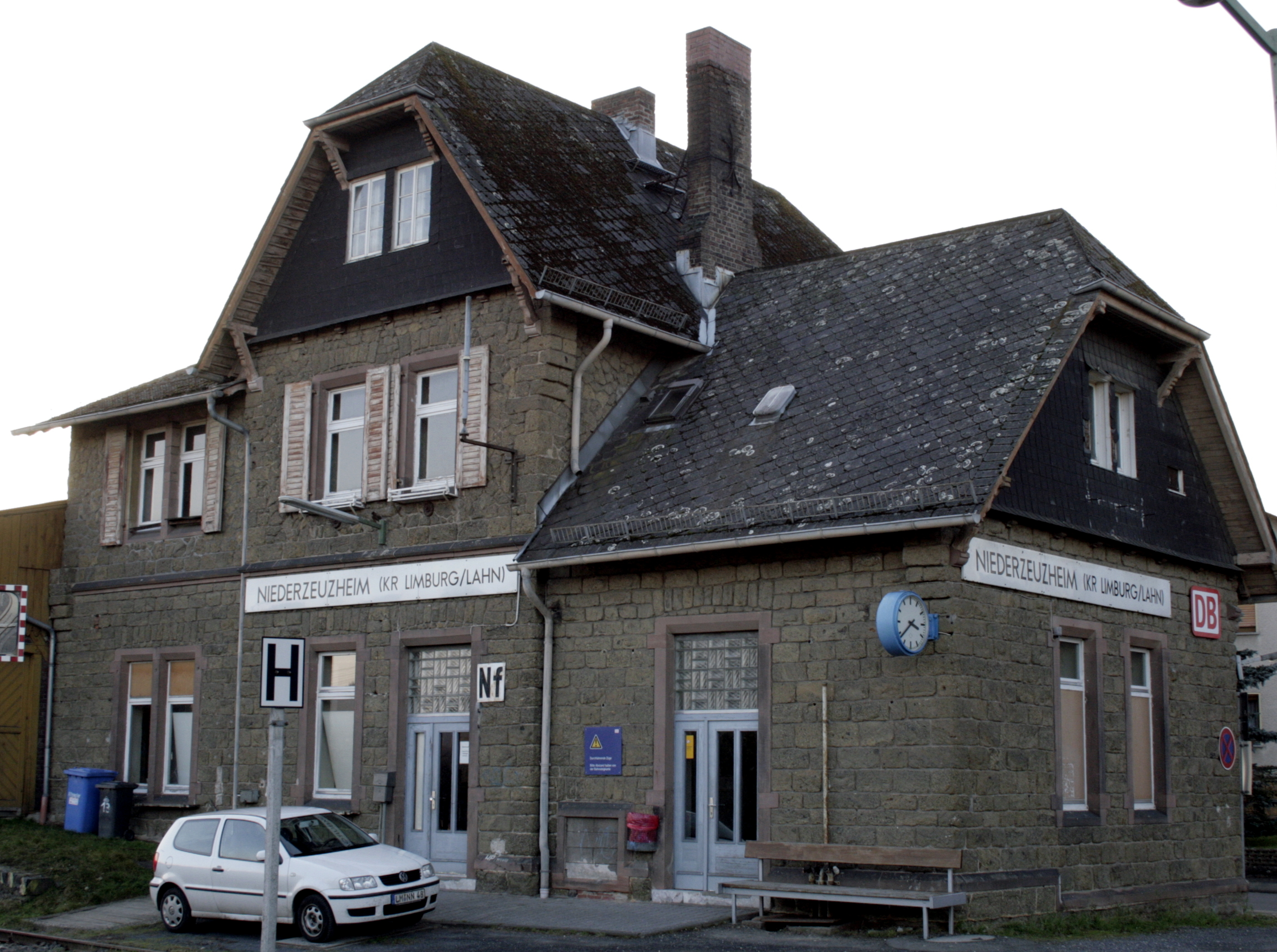
Niederzeuzheim

Located in the district Niederzeuzheim of Hadamar, the building is a listed building and largely preserved, in the past passenger and fright transport, nowadays it is only in use for passenger service. A good sheed is still recognisable. Interchange to public local bus transport and park and ride lot.

=== Frickhofen ===
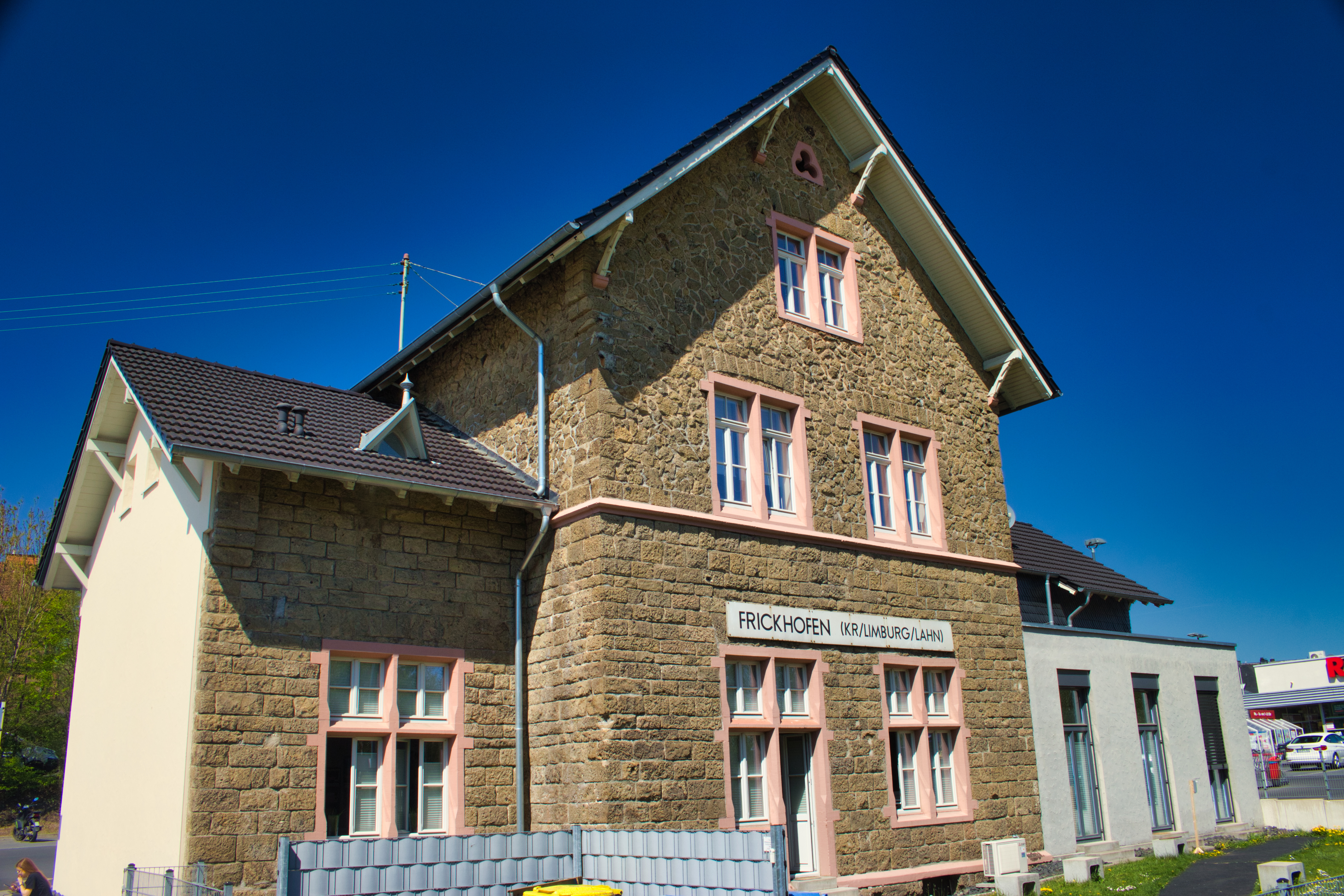
Frickhofen station, local bus stop ahead

Former a station with ticket teller, luggage service, signal box and goods sheed, Frickhofens station building is nowadays in private ownership. Interchange to local bus service.

=== Wilsenroth ===
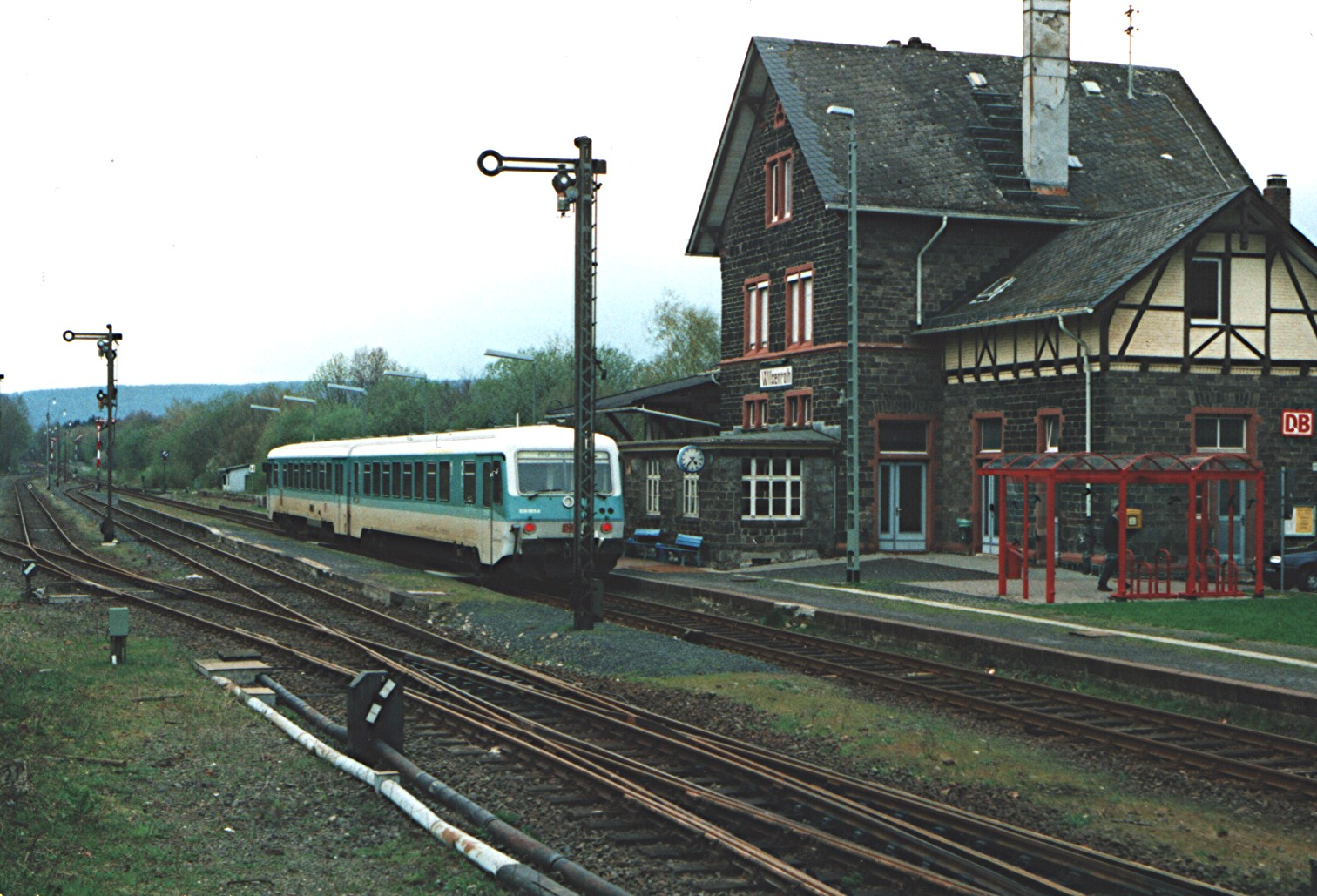
Class 628 running towards Au in Wilsenroth station

Train station in Wilsenroth, district of Dornburg reception building has been largely preserved in its original state, nowadays under private ownership and a listed building 2003. Transfer hub to local bus lines and park and ride lot.

=== Berzhahn ===
A simple train stop in the village Berzhahn.

=== Willmenrod ===
Nowadays a stop in Willmenrod, mostly preserved, historical station building.

=== Westerburg ===
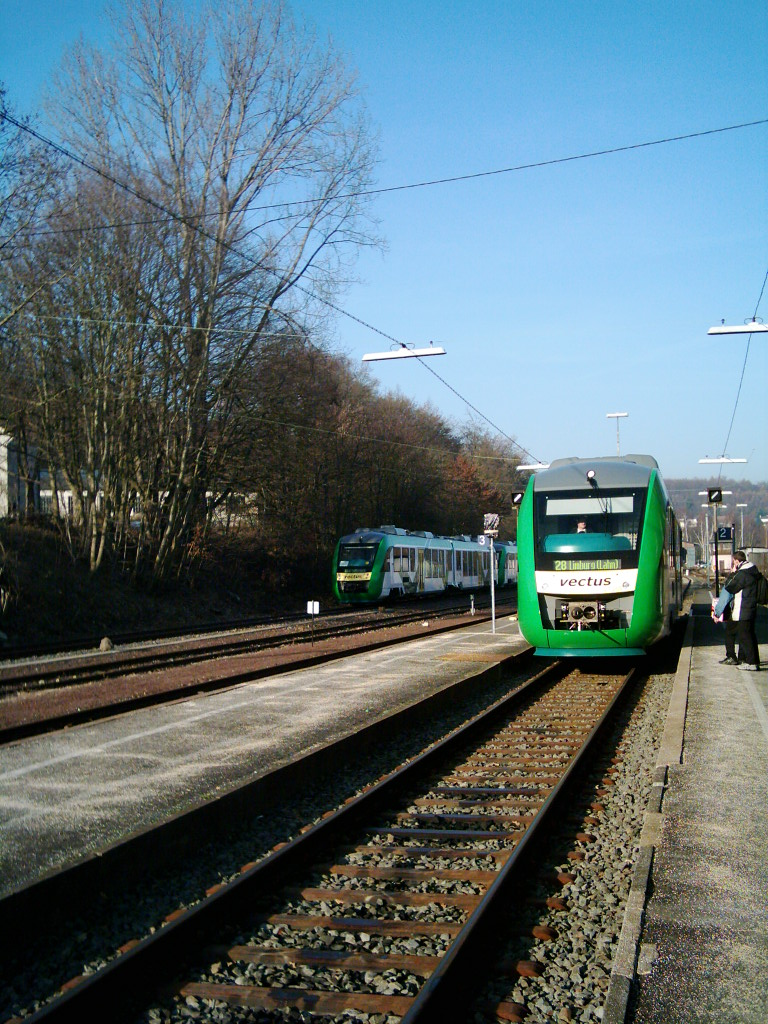
Multiple unit of vectus Verkehrsgesellschaft in Westerburg

Westerburg once was the transfer hub between Limburg-Altenkirchen railway and Cross Westerwald railway, nowadays on the former tracks and platforms of the Cross Westerwald railway a Park and ride lot and a Bike and ride facility has been constructed, on the tracks of the Cross Westerwald railway a walking and cycling path to Wallmerod. Transfer hub to the local bus service. The station building is under private ownership, a private museum "Eisenbahn Plakat Museum" (Railway transparent Museum) has been created inside the building as part of the "Erlebnisbahnhof Westerburg", the listed bridge building "Hülsbachtalbrücke" of the Cross Westerwald railway borders the Westerburg station.

=== Langenhahn ===
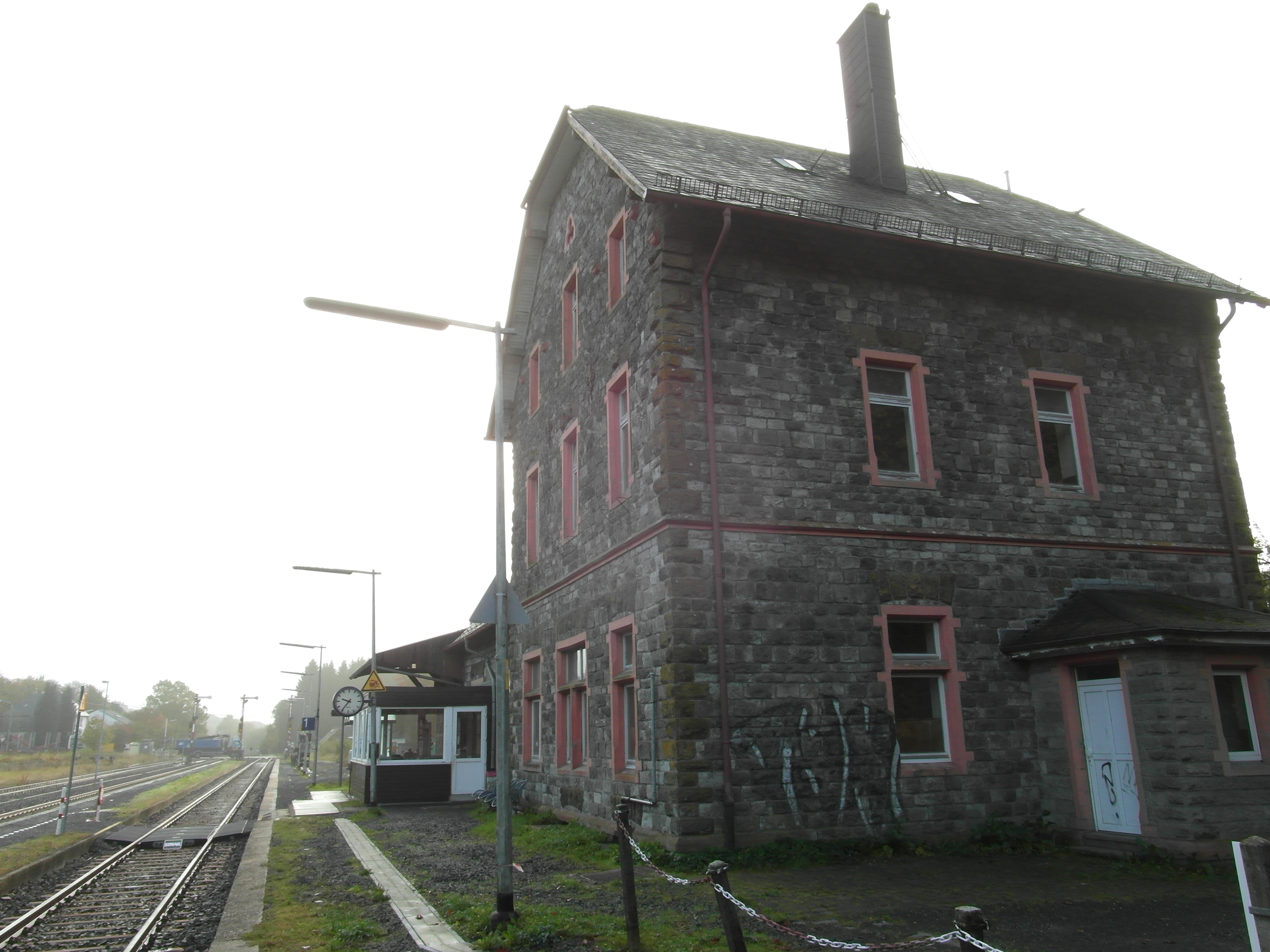
Langenhahn station

Langenhahn station is a former stop for passenger and fright transport, nowadays only a passenger train station, although the good sheed and ramp are largely preserved, it is a listed building.

=== Rotenhain ===
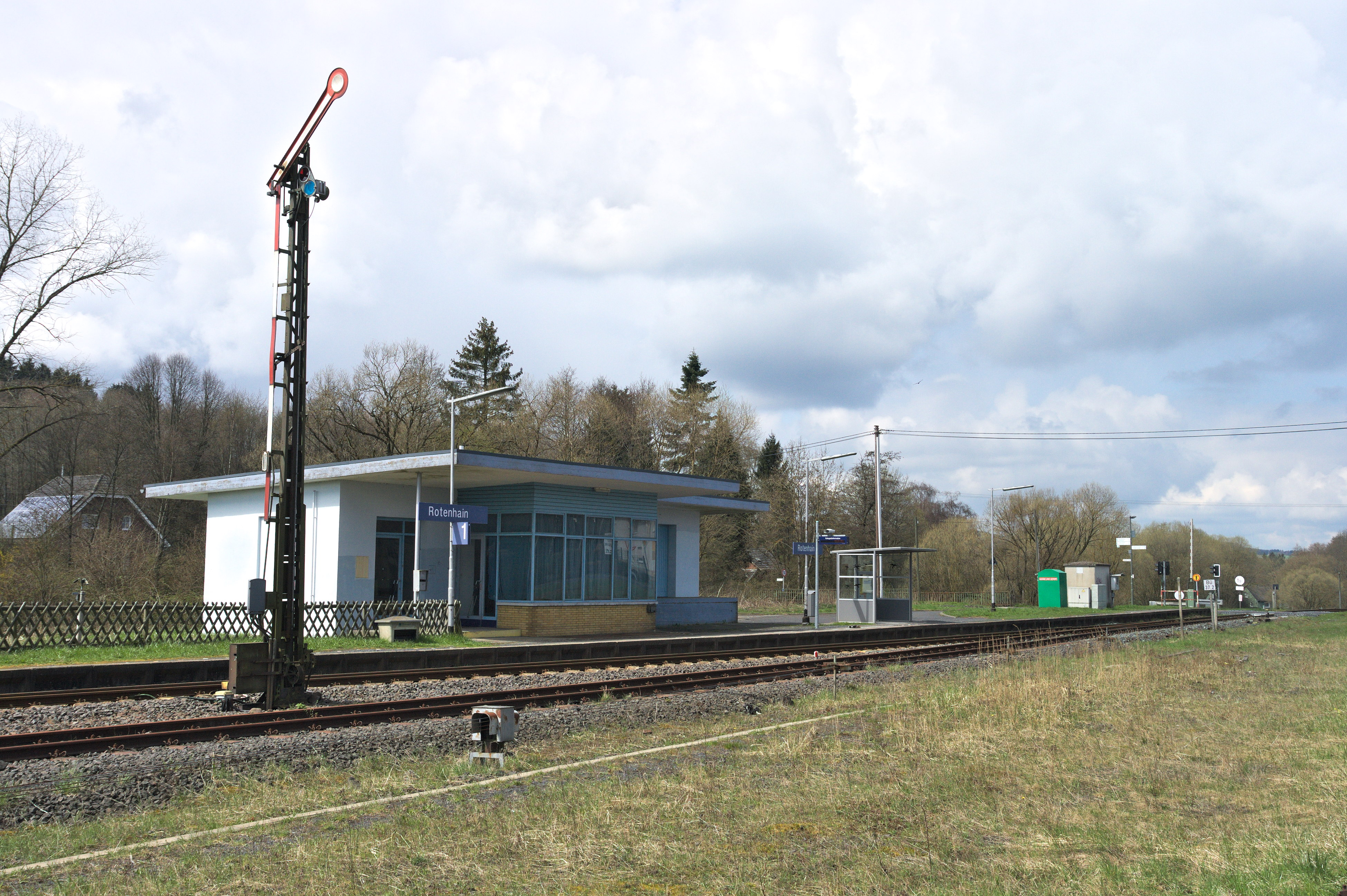
Rotenhain station with analog signal

Originally named "Rotzenhahn", now the official name is Rotenhain, the station is located a little outskirts of the village in an industrial area. The main reason for establishing the train station was a quarry, the station building is a. plastered building of the year, it 1968 with a slightly sloping, cantilevered facade all around. Rotenhain station used to be a for the fright traffic as well.

=== Enspel ===
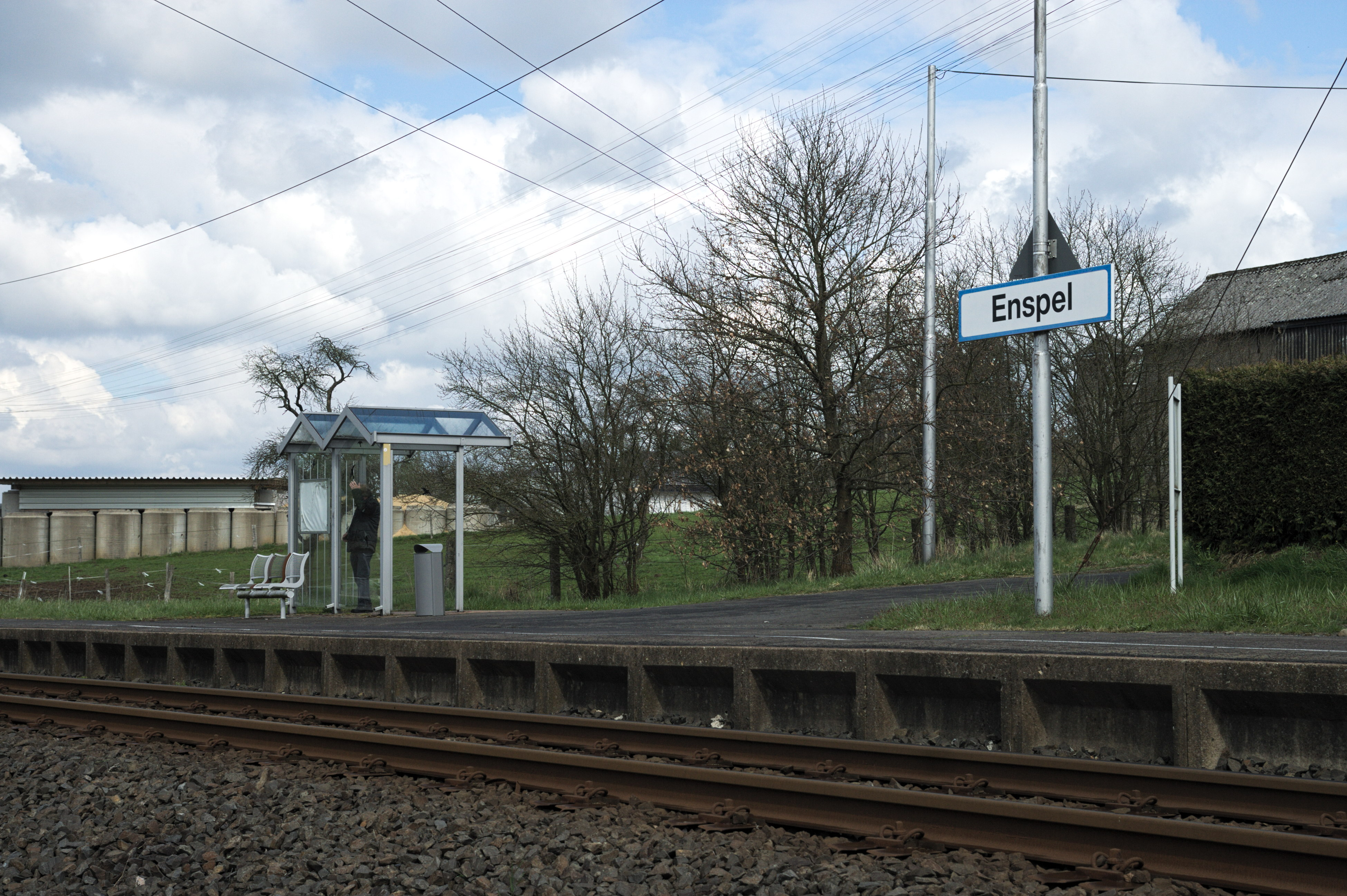
Enspel, platform in direction of Altenkirchen

A simple stop although it has two platforms but only one track.

=== Büdingen ===
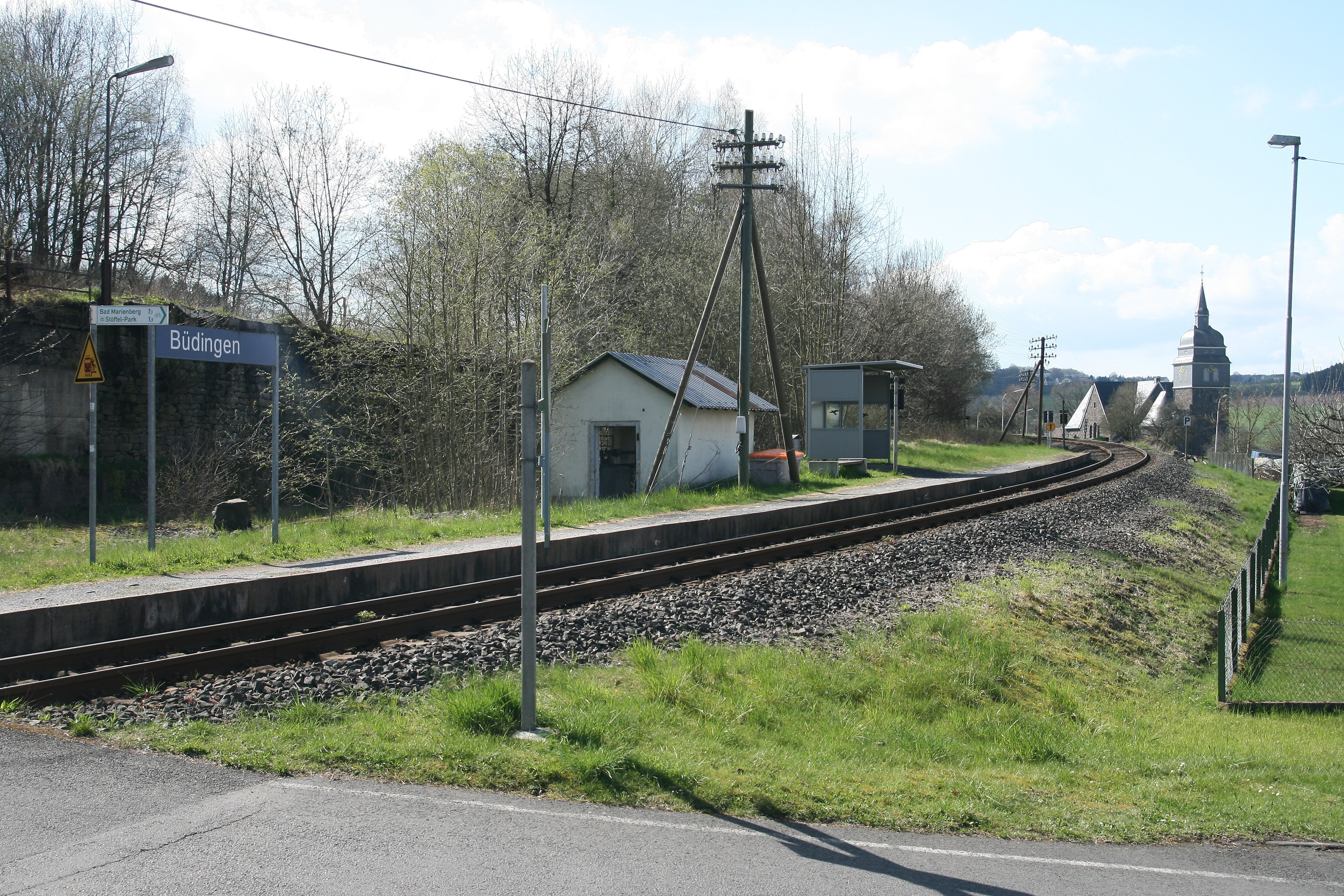
Train stop in Büdingen

A simple stop in Büdingen.

=== Nistertal-Bad Marienberg ===
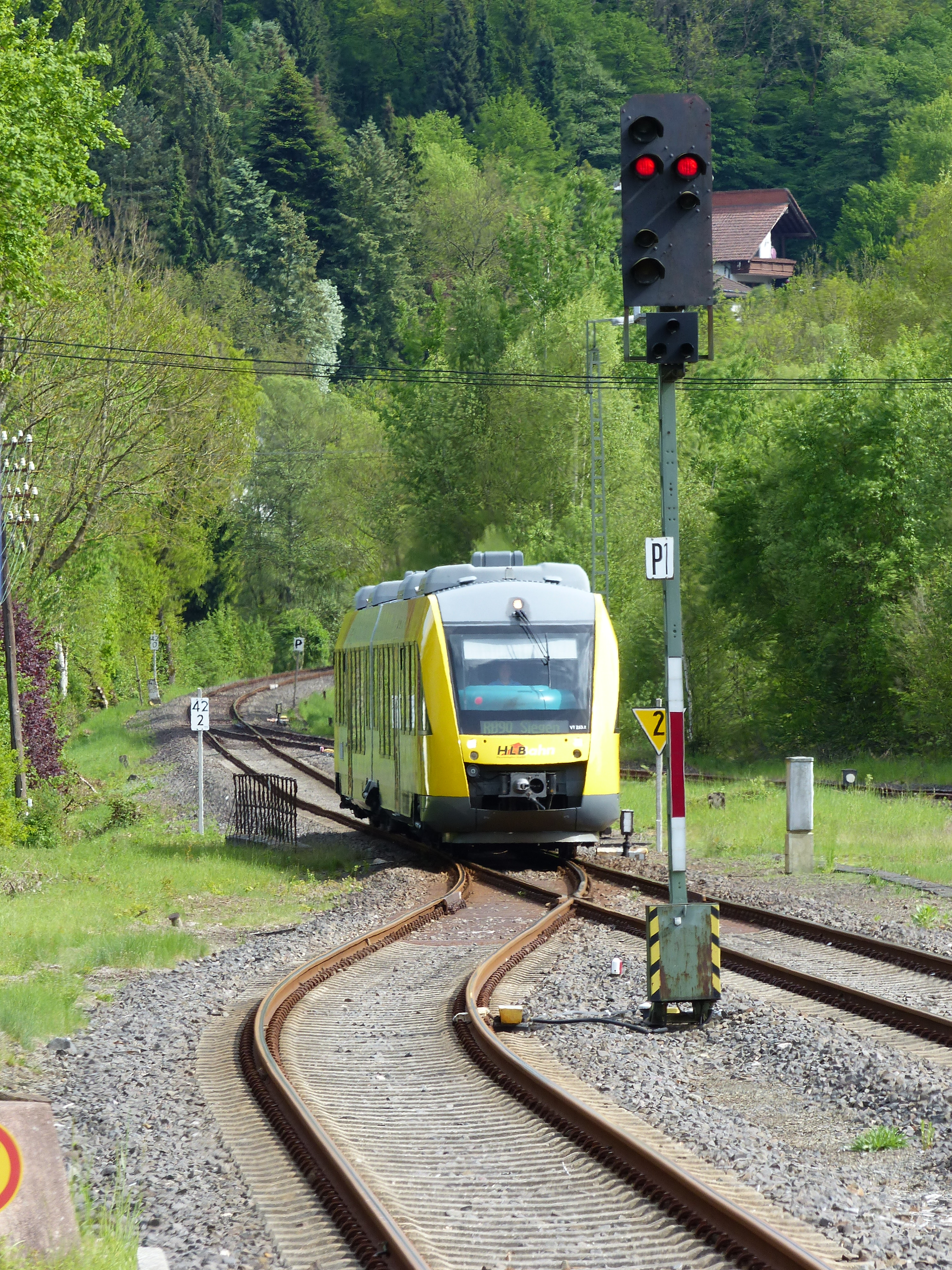
HLB RB90 arriving in Nistertal Bad Marienberg station, where in the past was an interchange towards Bad Marienberg an Fehl-Ritzhausen as well

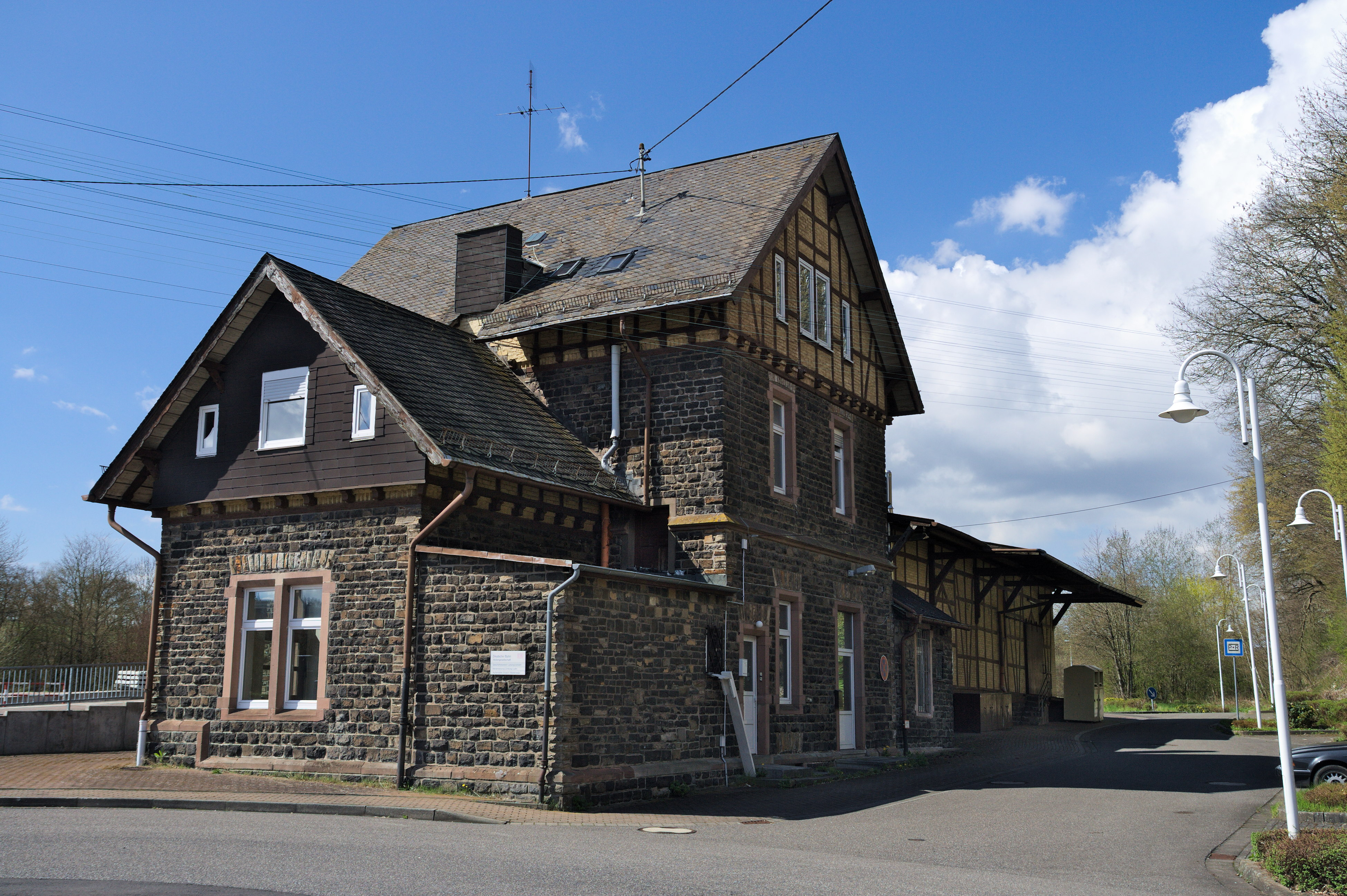
Nistertal Bad Marienberg station was called "Er sch (Westerw), as long as the branch line via Bad Marienberg to Fehl-Ritzhausen was still in service

The station is the former interchange to the trains of the Erbach-Fehl Ritzhausen line, has three platform tracks, but many more tracks without platform of the former line to Fehl-Ritzhausen at the Cross Westerwald railway via Bad Marienberg, as long as this line was in service, the station was named "Erbach (Westerwald). Connection to the local bus to Bad Marienberg and Park and ride lot.

=== Unnau - Korb ===
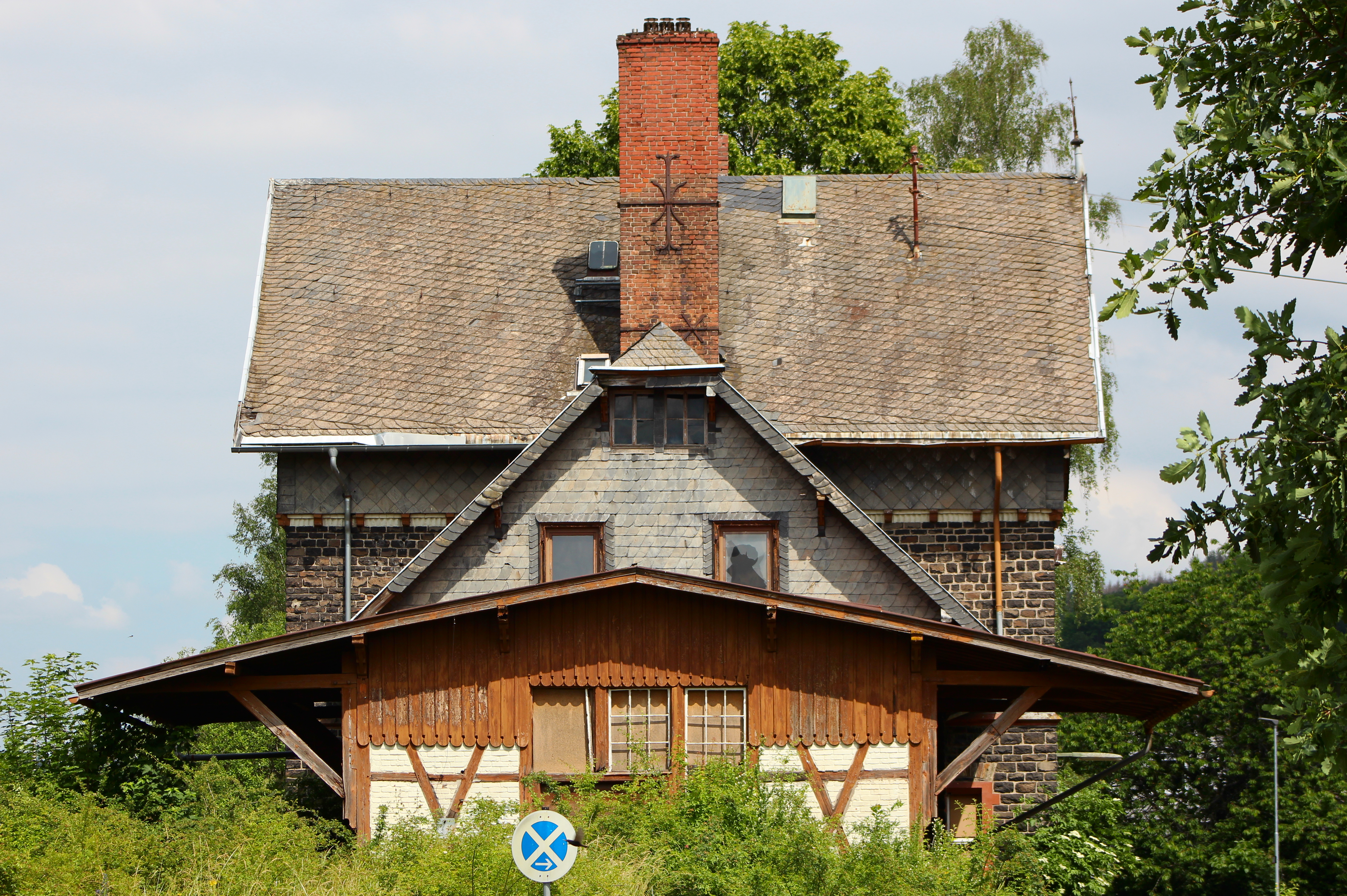
Unnau-Korb station, former goods sheed in front

Located in the area Korb of Unnau, the Unnau-Korb stop was a former train station, until the further tracks have been deconstructed in the year 2011, the station building is largely preserved.

=== Hachenburg ===
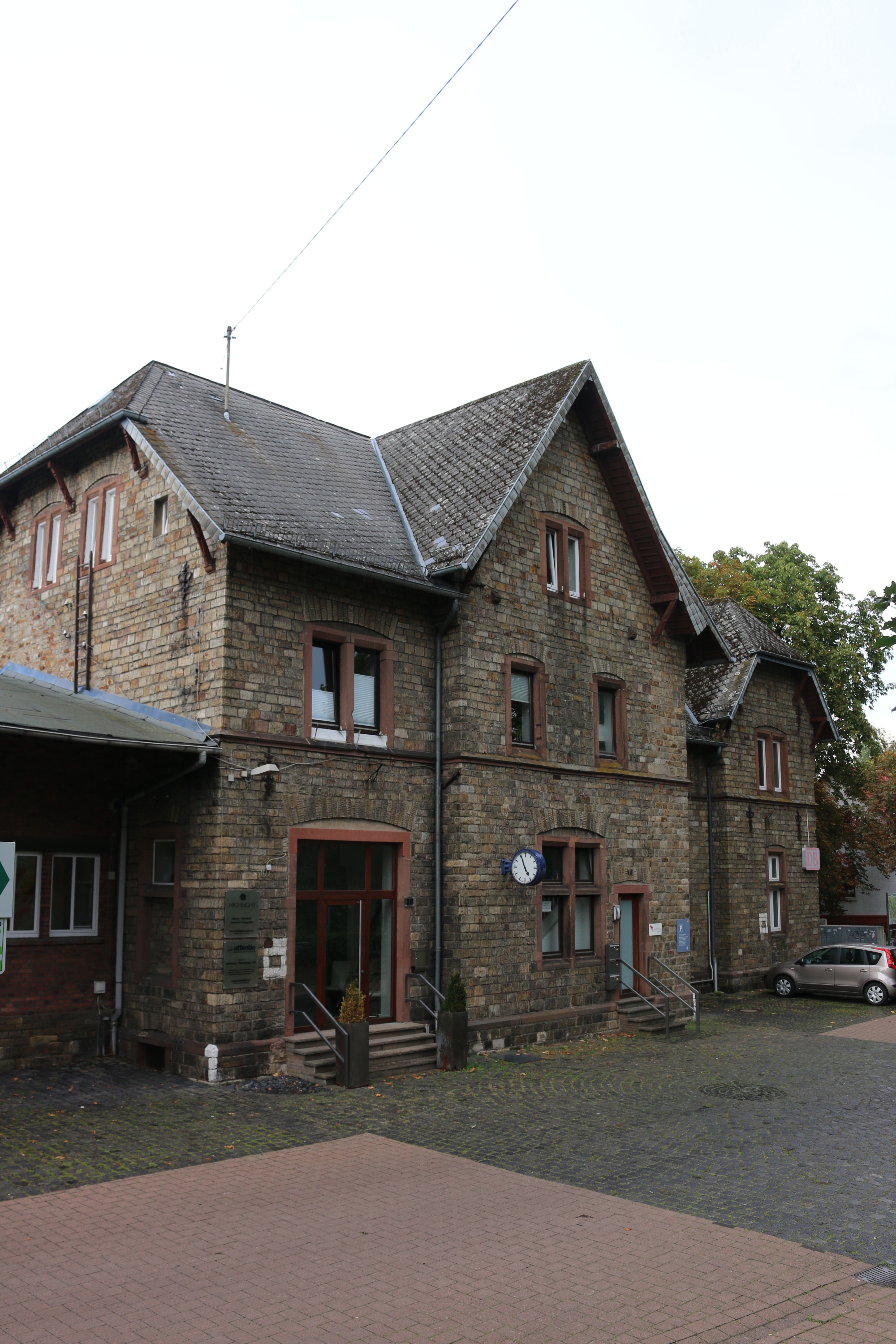
Hachenburg station, view from the street "Bahnhofstraße"

The station has three platform tracks although nowadays only two of them are active. This historical station building is sold and in private ownership. In the past the station was used from the trains of the Selters-Hachenburg narrow gauge railway line as well, which has been deconstructed.

=== Hattert ===
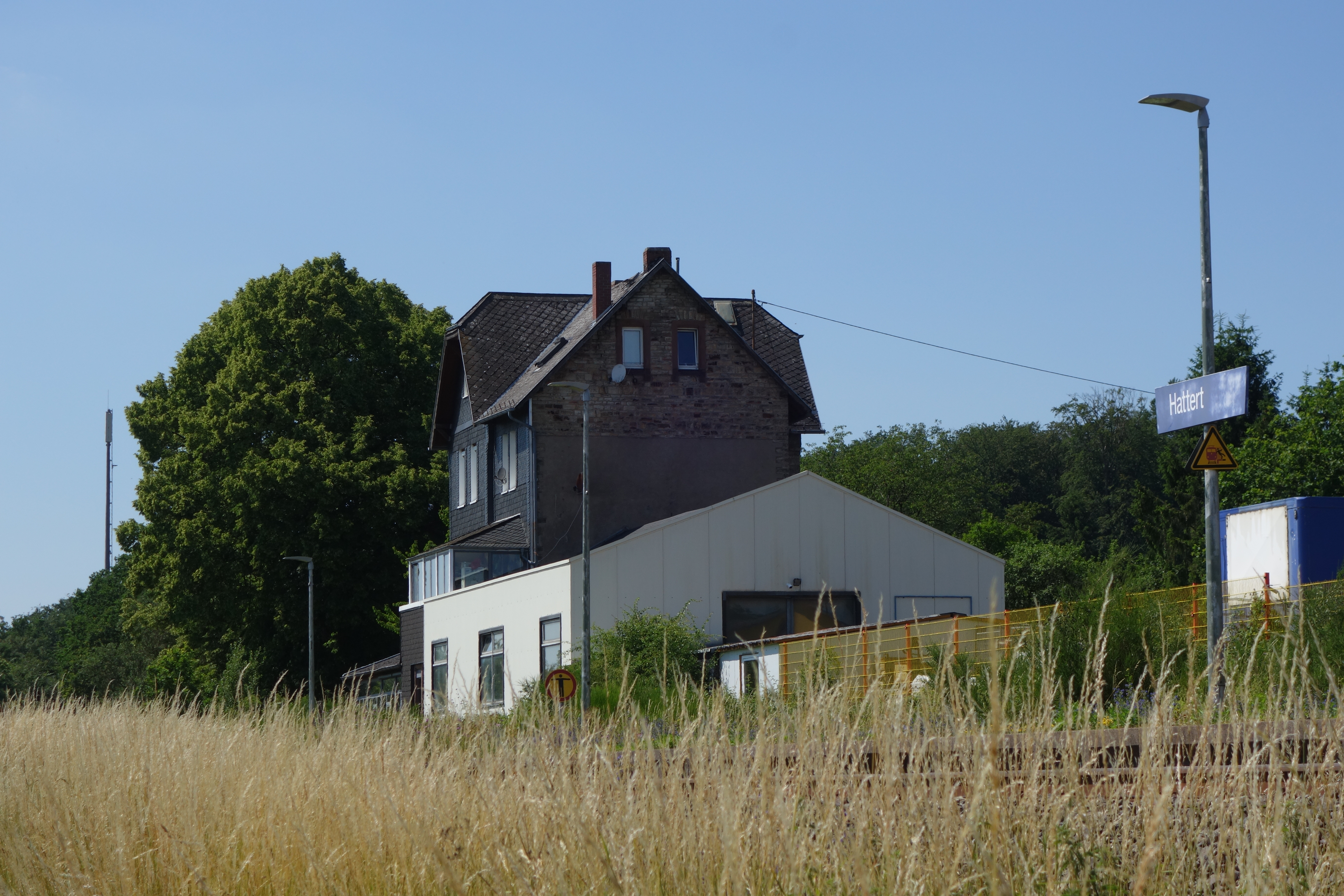
Former station building of Hattert

Located at the border between Müschenbach and Hattert, the former station, from which the Selters-Hachenburg narrow gauge railway turned via Hattert and Müschenbach to Selters, nowadays is a simple stop, although the historical station building is preserved and in private ownership.

=== Ingelbach ===
Ingelbach station

The station is located between Ingelbach and Kroppach in the landscape called Kroppacher Schweiz (Kroppach Swiss).

=== Altenkirchen (Westerw) ===
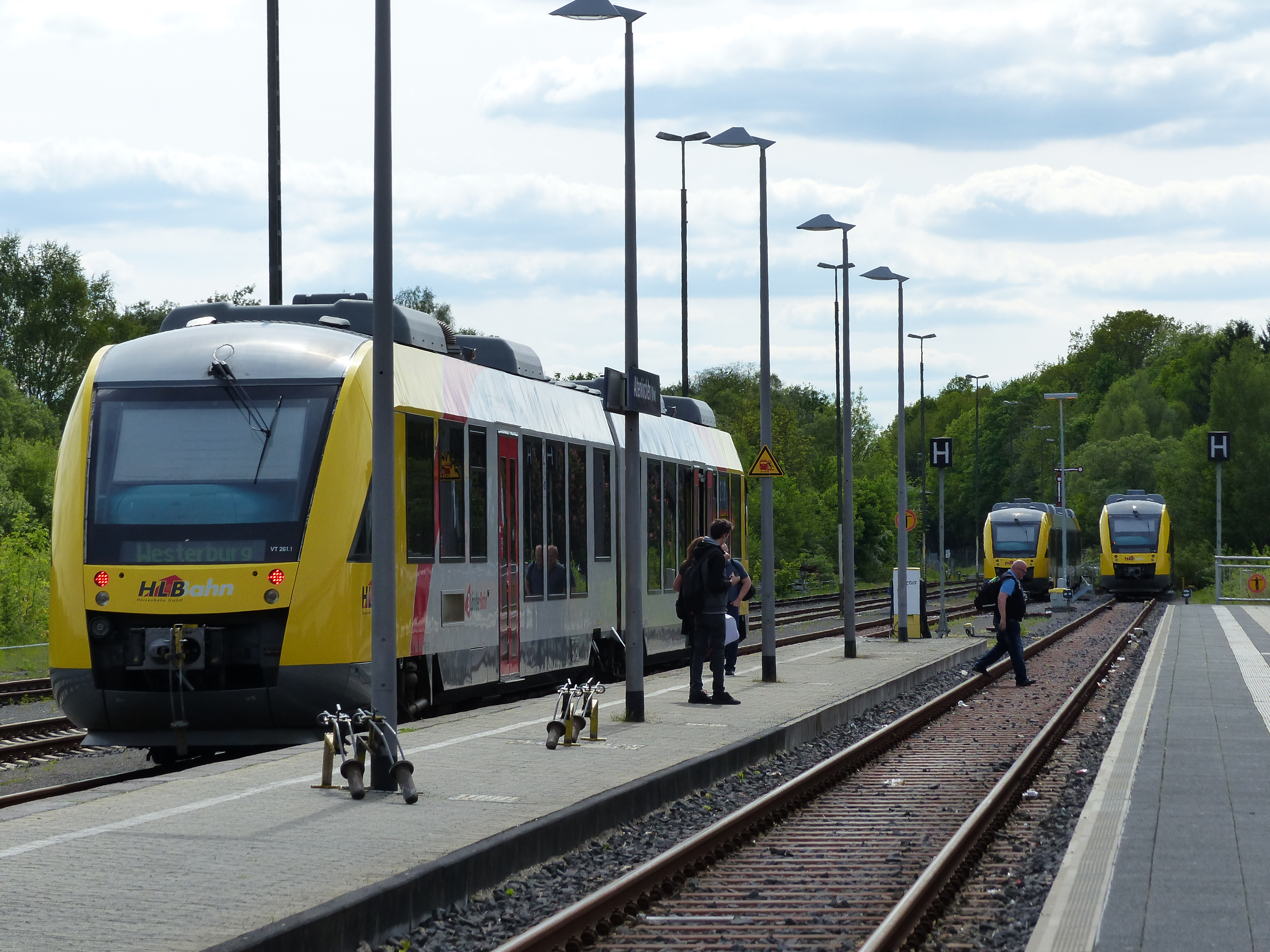
Altenkirchen station, platform of the passenger trains

The Altenkirchen station is a station of passenger and fright traffic and connection between Engers-Au railway and Limburg-Altenkirchen railway. It has two parts and two stain buildings, one or passenger and one for fright traffic, although the passengers section building isn't in use for the public transport anymore. The Altenkirchen station also is a transfer hub to the local bus service in the Westerwald.

== Fares ==
Rhein-Main-Verkehrsverbund (RMV)

Verkehrsverbund Rhein-Mosel (VRM)

The section from Limburg (Lahn) to Wilsenroth is located on the area of the Rhein-Main-Verkehrsverbund (RMV), the section from Berzhahn to Altenkirchen in the Verkehrsverbund Rhein-Mosel (Rhine-Moselle Transport Association, VRM) area. Diez Ost actually is located on the area of the VRM as well because of it s location in Rhine-Lahn district, but the RMV fare applies because by train Diez Ost is only reachable coming from the RMV area.
