= Altenkirchen (Verbandsgemeinde) =

- Verbandsgemeinde
- Coat of arms

- Location of Altenkirchen within Landkreis Altenkirchen district
- Interactive map of Altenkirchen
- Location within Germany Location within Rhineland-Palatinate
- Coordinates: 50.689318°N 7.649120°E
- Country: Germany
- State: Rhineland-Palatinate
- District: Landkreis Altenkirchen
- Disbanded: 2020
- Subdivisions: 42 Gemeinden

Area
  - Total: 153.52 km^{2} (59.27 sq mi)

Population (2018-12-31)
  - Total: 22,860
  - Density: 148.9/km^{2} (385.7/sq mi)
- Time zone: UTC+01:00 (CET)
  - Summer (DST): UTC+02:00 (CEST)
- Vehicle registration: AK
- Website: www.vg-altenkirchen.de

Altenkirchen is a former Verbandsgemeinde ("collective municipality") in the district of Altenkirchen, in Rhineland-Palatinate, Germany. The seat of the Verbandsgemeinde was in Altenkirchen. On 1 January 2020 it was merged into the new Verbandsgemeinde Altenkirchen-Flammersfeld. It lies within the region of the Westerwald known as Kroppach Switzerland.

The Verbandsgemeinde Altenkirchen consisted of the following Ortsgemeinden ("local municipalities"):

Municipality	Area (km²)	Population (2024)
Almersbach	0.61	398
Altenkirchen *	10.98	6,603
Bachenberg	1.67	101
Berod bei Hachenburg	5.05	614
Birnbach	3.11	683
Busenhausen	3.02	349
Eichelhardt	2.84	514
Ersfeld	1.40	70
Fiersbach	3.04	275
Fluterschen	3.37	651
Forstmehren	1.61	164
Gieleroth	5.92	689
Hasselbach	5.76	334
Helmenzen	4.15	921
Helmeroth	3.57	209
Hemmelzen	2.83	309
Heupelzen	2.58	249
Hilgenroth	2.96	294
Hirz-Maulsbach	6.14	304
Idelberg	1.13	61
Ingelbach	5.08	510
Isert	1.84	111
Kettenhausen	1.68	313
Kircheib	6.55	536
Kraam	2.73	165
Mammelzen	4.12	1,067
Mehren	3.67	488
Michelbach	4.42	549
Neitersen	5.64	1,086
Obererbach	3.63	553
Oberirsen	9.45	617
Oberwambach	3.99	438
Ölsen	2.26	74
Racksen	1.97	138
Rettersen	3.21	362
Schöneberg	3.20	439
Sörth	1.99	260
Stürzelbach	1.77	232
Volkerzen	1.98	82
Werkhausen	5.75	235
Weyerbusch	4.22	1,442
Wölmersen	2.63	379
Verbandsgemeinde Altenkirchen	153.52	22,860 (2018)

^{*} seat of the Verbandsgemeinde
