= Flammersfeld (Verbandsgemeinde) =

- Verbandsgemeinde
- Coat of arms

- Location of Flammersfeld within Landkreis Altenkirchen district
- Interactive map of Flammersfeld
- Location within Germany Location within Rhineland-Palatinate
- Coordinates: 50°38′46″N 7°31′26″E
- Country: Germany
- State: Rhineland-Palatinate
- District: Landkreis Altenkirchen
- Disbanded: 2020
- Subdivisions: 26 Gemeinden

Area
  - Total: 75.31 km^{2} (29.08 sq mi)

Population (2018-12-31)
  - Total: 12,159
  - Density: 161.5/km^{2} (418.2/sq mi)
- Time zone: UTC+01:00 (CET)
  - Summer (DST): UTC+02:00 (CEST)
- Vehicle registration: AK
- Website: www.vg-flammersfeld.de

Flammersfeld is a former Verbandsgemeinde ("collective municipality") in the district of Altenkirchen, in Rhineland-Palatinate, Germany. The seat of the Verbandsgemeinde was in Flammersfeld. On 1 January 2020 it was merged into the new Verbandsgemeinde Altenkirchen-Flammersfeld.

The Verbandsgemeinde Flammersfeld consisted of the following 26 Ortsgemeinden ("local municipalities"):

Municipality	Area (km^{2})	Population (2024)
Berzhausen	2.37	203
Bürdenbach	2.80	662
Burglahr	2.87	507
Eichen	4.27	565
Eulenberg	1.16	55
Flammersfeld *	4.06	1,481
Giershausen	2.11	94
Güllesheim	2.20	763
Horhausen	4.72	2,081
Kescheid	4.82	129
Krunkel	2.81	590
Niedersteinebach	0.79	202
Oberlahr	2.82	757
Obernau	1.48	187
Obersteinebach	3.33	241
Orfgen	3.74	243
Peterslahr	2.31	329
Pleckhausen	1.99	832
Reiferscheid	2.13	423
Rott	9.79	396
Schürdt	2.01	295
Seelbach	2.99	272
Seifen	2.95	132
Walterschen	2.12	161
Willroth	1.97	966
Ziegenhain	0.71	164
Verbandsgemeinde Flammersfeld	75.31	12,159 (2018)

^{*} seat of the Verbandsgemeinde
