= Lahrer Herrlichkeit =

Coordinates: 50°37′N 07°30′E

The Lahrer Herrlichkeit is a landscape region in the collective municipality of Flammersfeld in the county of Altenkirchen in the German state of Rhineland-Palatinate.

== General ==
The region lies on the middle reaches of the River Wied and owes its name to Lahr Castle, which is now a ruins located above the Wied. The present-day region of Lahrer Herrlichkeit includes the villages of Burglahr, Peterslahr, Eulenberg and Oberlahr. It has a population of around 1,700 and covers an area of about 12 km^{2}.

== History ==
The region is first recorded in the 13th century and was initially in the possession of the House of Isenburg before transferring to the Electorate of Cologne, which created its own principality here (hence the name Herrlichkeit meaning "sovereignty" or "lordship") and defended it against the Electorate of Trier and the counties of Wied and Sayn by constructing the castle. The historical (Electoral Cologne) "Lahrer Herrlichkeit" only included the villages of Burglahr and Oberlahr. At that time the parishes of Peterslahr and Eulenberg belonged to Trier.

In 1803, following the Reichsdeputationshauptschluss, both the Cologne and Trier-owned territories went to the Duchy of Nassau and eventually, in 1815, to Prussia.

Today the region is a popular tourist destination. The 14th stage of the long-distance path, the Westerwald Trail, runs through Lahrer Herrlichkeit past Peterslahr.
