= Harbach =

Harbach may refer to:

== Locations ==
- Harbach, Rhineland-Palatinate, a municipality in Altenkirchen, Rhineland-Palatinate, Germany
- Harbach, a village in Grünberg, Gießen, Hesse, Germany
- Harbach, a cadastral community in Bad Hofgastein, St. Johann im Pongau, Salzburg, Austria

== People ==
- Barbara Harbach (born 1946), American composer, harpsichordist and organist
- Chad Harbach (born 1975), American writer
- Otto Harbach (1873–1963), American lyricist and librettist
- William O. Harbach (1919–2017), American television producer
