= Mudersbach =

- Municipality
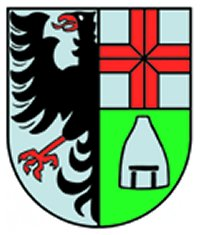
- Coat of arms

- Location of Mudersbach within Altenkirchen district
- Interactive map of Mudersbach
- Location within Germany Location within Rhineland-Palatinate
- Coordinates: 50°49′30″N 7°56′42″E
- Country: Germany
- State: Rhineland-Palatinate
- District: Altenkirchen
- Municipal assoc.: Kirchen (Sieg)
- Subdivisions: 3 Ortsteile

Government
  - Mayor (2019–24): Maik Köhler (CDU)

Area
  - Total: 9.42 km^{2} (3.64 sq mi)
- Elevation: 427 m (1,401 ft)

Population (2025-12-31)
  - Total: 5,913
  - Density: 628/km^{2} (1,630/sq mi)
- Time zone: UTC+01:00 (CET)
  - Summer (DST): UTC+02:00 (CEST)
- Postal codes: 57549–57555
- Dialling codes: 0271, 02745 (Mudersbach)
- Vehicle registration: AK
- Website: www.kirchen-sieg.de

Mudersbach is a municipality in the district of Altenkirchen, in Rhineland-Palatinate, in western Germany.

== Transport ==
Mudersbach has a train station on the Sieg Railway which is served by RE9, RB90 and RB93 of DreiLänderBahn, a section of Hessische Landesbahn (HLB). Additionally, Mudersbach is served by the local bus lines 296 (Niederschelderhütte - Kirchen (Sieg)) and 297 (Brachbach - Niederschelderhütte) and located in the zone number 934 of the transport association Verkehrsverbund Rhein-Mosel (VRM).
