= Niederfischbach =

- Municipality
- Location of Niederfischbach within Altenkirchen district
- Interactive map of Niederfischbach
- Location within Germany Location within Rhineland-Palatinate
- Coordinates: 50°51′20″N 7°52′40″E
- Country: Germany
- State: Rhineland-Palatinate
- District: Altenkirchen
- Municipal assoc.: Kirchen (Sieg)
- Subdivisions: 3 Ortsteile

Government
  - Mayor (2019–24): Dominik Schuh (CDU)

Area
  - Total: 14.48 km^{2} (5.59 sq mi)
- Elevation: 282 m (925 ft)

Population (2025-12-31)
  - Total: 4,159
  - Density: 287.2/km^{2} (743.9/sq mi)
- Time zone: UTC+01:00 (CET)
  - Summer (DST): UTC+02:00 (CEST)
- Postal codes: 57572
- Dialling codes: 02734
- Vehicle registration: AK
- Website: www.niederfischbach.de

Niederfischbach is a municipality in the district of Altenkirchen, in Rhineland-Palatinate, in western Germany.
