= Kirchen (Verbandsgemeinde) =

Kirchen (Sieg)
- Verbandsgemeinde
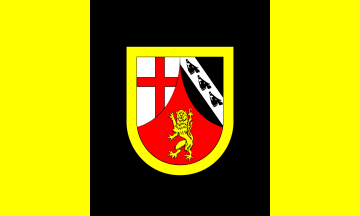
- Flag Coat of arms

- Location of Kirchen (Sieg) within Landkreis Altenkirchen district
- Interactive map of Kirchen (Sieg)
- Location within Germany Location within Rhineland-Palatinate
- Coordinates: 50°48′28″N 7°52′53″E
- Country: Germany
- State: Rhineland-Palatinate
- District: Landkreis Altenkirchen
- Subdivisions: 6 Gemeinden

Government
  - Mayor (2021–29): Andreas Hundhausen (SPD)

Area
  - Total: 127.07 km^{2} (49.06 sq mi)

Population (2025-12-31)
  - Total: 22,694
  - Density: 178.59/km^{2} (462.56/sq mi)
- Time zone: UTC+01:00 (CET)
  - Summer (DST): UTC+02:00 (CEST)
- Vehicle registration: AK
- Website: www.kirchen-sieg.de

Verbandsgemeinde Kirchen (Sieg) is a Verbandsgemeinde ("collective municipality") in the district of Altenkirchen, in Rhineland-Palatinate, Germany. The seat of the Verbandsgemeinde is in Kirchen.

The Verbandsgemeinde Kirchen (Sieg) consists of the following 6 Ortsgemeinden ("local municipalities"):

Municipality	Area (km²)	Population
Brachbach	6.36	2323
Friesenhagen	51.36	1590
Harbach	5.64	510
Kirchen (Sieg) *	39.76	8199
Mudersbach	9.48	5913
Niederfischbach	14.47	4159
Verbandsgemeinde Kirchen (Sieg)	127.07	22694

^{*} seat of the Verbandsgemeinde
