= Friesenhagen =

- Municipality
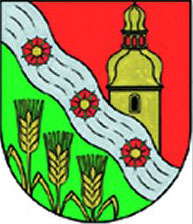
- Coat of arms

- Location of Friesenhagen within Altenkirchen (Westerwald) district
- Interactive map of Friesenhagen
- Location within Germany Location within Rhineland-Palatinate
- Coordinates: 50°54′12″N 7°48′38″E
- Country: Germany
- State: Rhineland-Palatinate
- District: Altenkirchen (Westerwald)
- Municipal assoc.: Kirchen (Sieg)

Government
  - Mayor (2019–24): Norbert Kläs (SPD)

Area
  - Total: 51.36 km^{2} (19.83 sq mi)
- Elevation: 330 m (1,080 ft)

Population (2025-12-31)
  - Total: 1,590
  - Density: 31.0/km^{2} (80.2/sq mi)
- Time zone: UTC+01:00 (CET)
  - Summer (DST): UTC+02:00 (CEST)
- Postal codes: 51598
- Dialling codes: 02734, 02294, 02297
- Vehicle registration: AK
- Website: www.friesenhagen.de

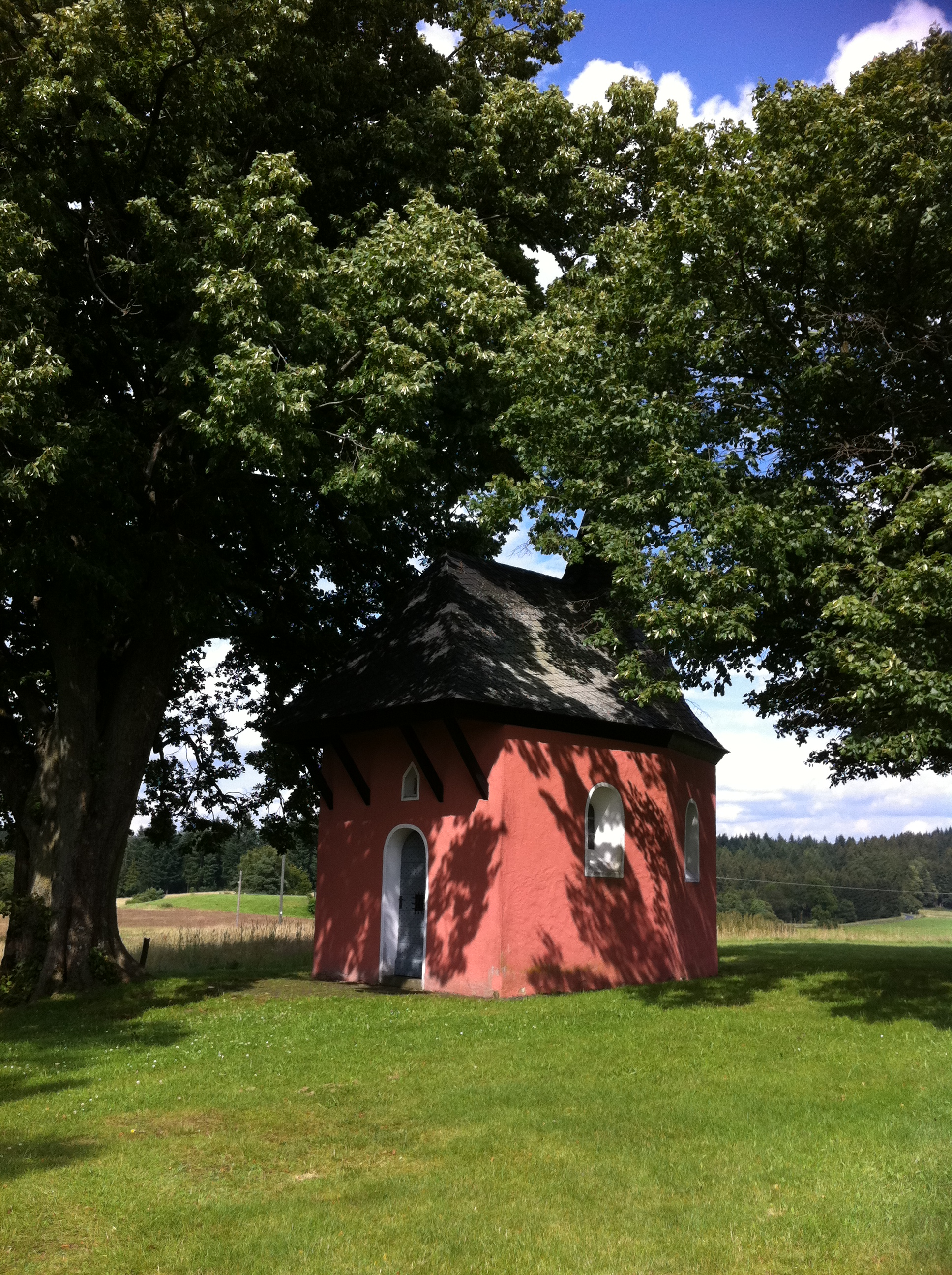
Rote Kapelle (red chapel)

Friesenhagen is a municipality in the north of the district of Altenkirchen, in Rhineland-Palatinate, Germany.

== Geography ==
Friesenhagen is the northernmost community of Rhineland-Palatinate. With an area of 51.3 square kilometres (19.8 mi^{2}), it is also the largest community in the district of Altenkirchen.

Oftentimes, the Friesenhagen area is also referred to as "Wildenburger Land", owing to the presence of nearby Castle Wildenburg.

== History ==
Friesenhagen was first mentioned in a papal document issued by Pope Innocence II in the year 1311.

The altar of St. Sebastian's church is attributed to the first half of the 13th Century.

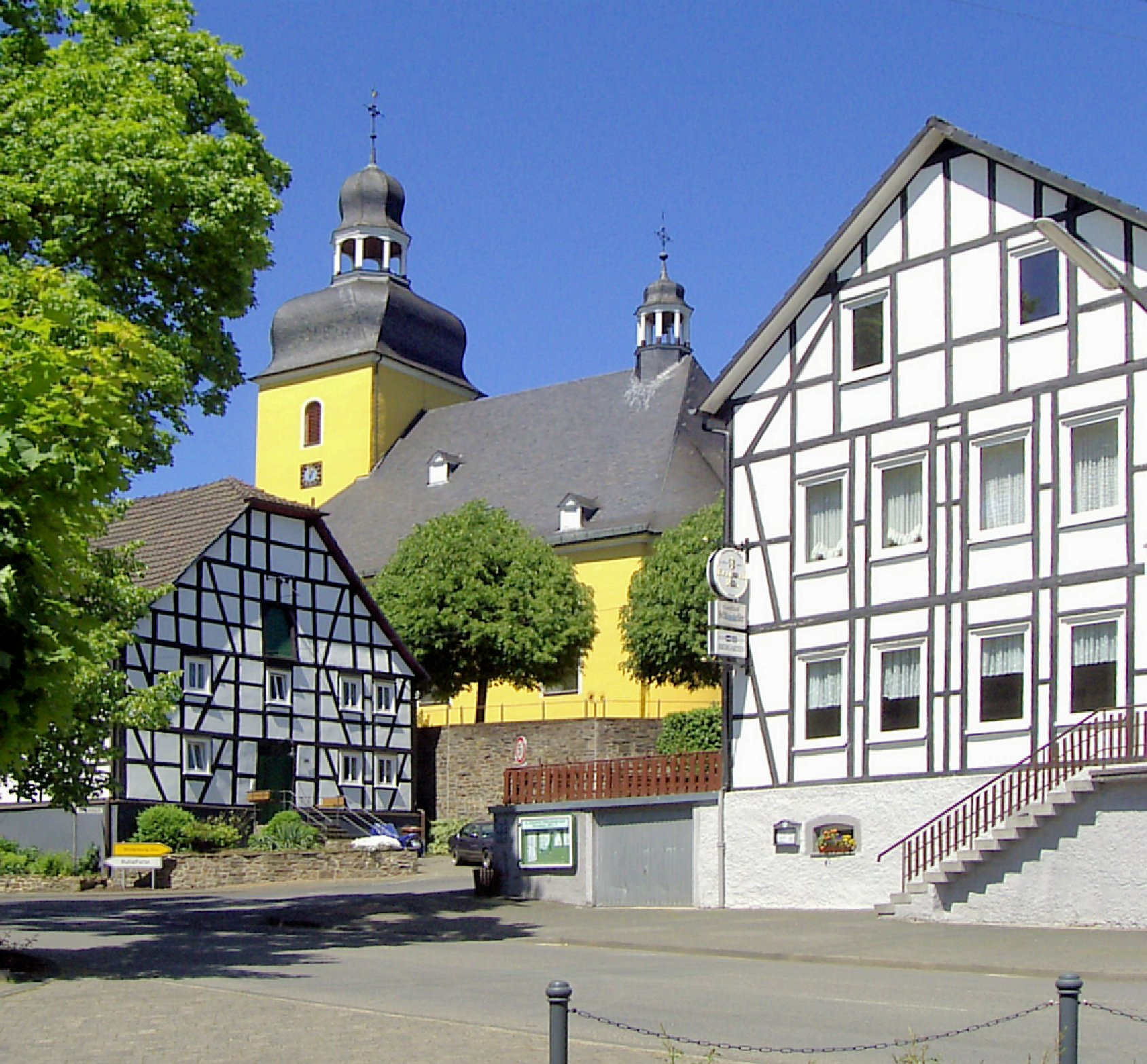
St.Sebastianus church in the center of Friesenhagen

In the late medieval period, marked by the 30-year war (1618 to 1648) and for more than half a century, Friesenhagen was the location of infamous witch-hunts. Over 200 people, both male and female, perished in the years of persecution between 1590 and 1652. The executions of supposed witches took place on "Blumenberg", a hill overlooking the village of Friesenhagen. In memory of the persecutions, St. Anna Chapel, more commonly referred to as "red chapel", was built in this location.
