= Oberlahr =

- Municipality
- Location of Oberlahr within Altenkirchen district
- Interactive map of Oberlahr
- Location within Germany Location within Rhineland-Palatinate
- Coordinates: 50°37′25″N 7°31′03″E
- Country: Germany
- State: Rhineland-Palatinate
- District: Altenkirchen
- Municipal assoc.: Altenkirchen-Flammersfeld

Government
  - Mayor (2019–24): Anneliese Rosenstein

Area
  - Total: 2.82 km^{2} (1.09 sq mi)
- Elevation: 195 m (640 ft)

Population (2025-12-31)
  - Total: 800
  - Density: 280/km^{2} (730/sq mi)
- Time zone: UTC+01:00 (CET)
  - Summer (DST): UTC+02:00 (CEST)
- Postal codes: 57641
- Dialling codes: 02685
- Vehicle registration: AK
- Website: www.oberlahr.de

Oberlahr is a municipality in the district of Altenkirchen, in Rhineland-Palatinate, in western Germany.

== Transport ==
Oberlahr is located at the former Kasbachtal railway from Linz (Rhine) to Flammersfeld station in Seelbach, which is out of service today, Oberlahr is connected to the local bus network and located in the area of the transport association Verkehrsverbund Rhein-Mosel (VRM), zone number 902.
