= Weitefeld =

- Municipality
- Coat of arms

- Location of Weitefeld within Altenkirchen district
- Interactive map of Weitefeld
- Location within Germany Location within Rhineland-Palatinate
- Coordinates: 50°43′34″N 7°55′50″E
- Country: Germany
- State: Rhineland-Palatinate
- District: Altenkirchen
- Municipal assoc.: Daaden-Herdorf

Government
  - Mayor (2019–24): Karl-Heinz Keßler

Area
  - Total: 8.49 km^{2} (3.28 sq mi)
- Elevation: 466 m (1,529 ft)

Population (2025-12-31)
  - Total: 2,313
  - Density: 272/km^{2} (706/sq mi)
- Time zone: UTC+01:00 (CET)
  - Summer (DST): UTC+02:00 (CEST)
- Postal codes: 57586
- Dialling codes: 02743
- Vehicle registration: AK
- Website: www.weitefeld.de

Weitefeld is a municipality in the district of Altenkirchen, in Rhineland-Palatinate, in western Germany.

== Transport ==
Weitefeld is located at the Westerwald railway, which is currently out of service.
