= Pracht =

- Municipality
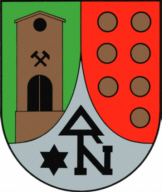
- Coat of arms

- Location of Pracht within Altenkirchen district
- Interactive map of Pracht
- Location within Germany Location within Rhineland-Palatinate
- Coordinates: 50°45′47″N 7°39′27″E
- Country: Germany
- State: Rhineland-Palatinate
- District: Altenkirchen
- Municipal assoc.: Hamm (Sieg)
- Subdivisions: 7

Government
  - Mayor (2019–24): Udo Seidler

Area
  - Total: 5.5 km^{2} (2.1 sq mi)
- Elevation: 200 m (660 ft)

Population (2025-12-31)
  - Total: 1,490
  - Density: 270/km^{2} (700/sq mi)
- Time zone: UTC+01:00 (CET)
  - Summer (DST): UTC+02:00 (CEST)
- Postal codes: 57589
- Dialling codes: 02682
- Vehicle registration: AK
- Website: www.hamm-sieg.de

Pracht (German pronunciation: [pʁaxt]) is a municipality in the district of Altenkirchen, in Rhineland-Palatinate, in western Germany.

== Religion ==
The buddhistic Hassel Abbey is located on Pracht.

== Transport ==
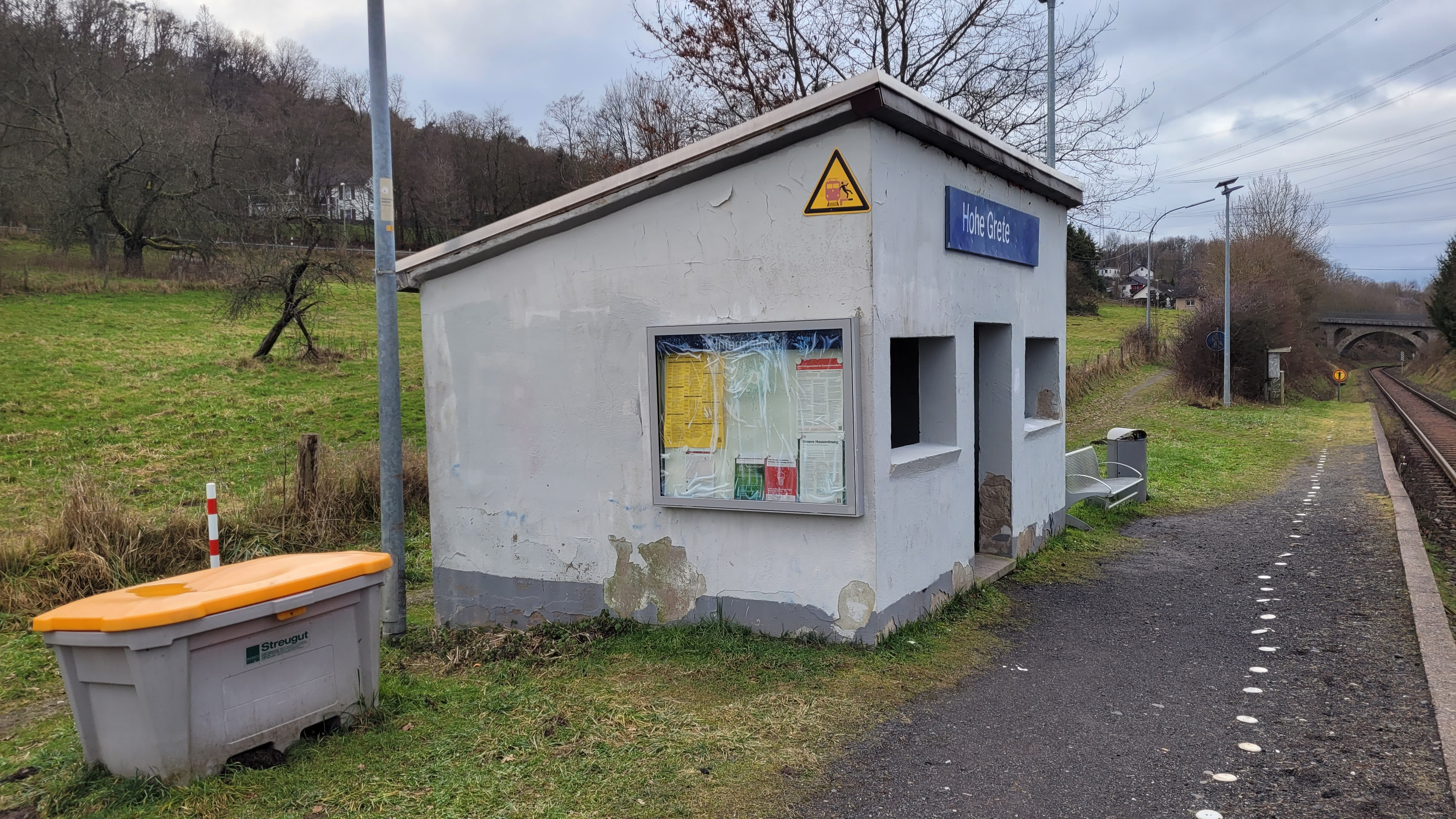
Train stop located in Pracht - Hohegrete

Hohegrete train stop is located in the district Wickhausen at the Engers–Au railway and served by the trains of line RB90 (Limburg - Diez Ost - Westerburg - Hachenburg - Altenkirchen - Au (Sieg) - Betzdorf (Sieg) - Siegen Hbf of DreiLänderBahn, a section of Hessische Landesbahn (HLB) , it is located on the area of the transport association Verkehrsverbund Rhein-Mosel (VRM), fare zone no. 919.

The local bus line 934 runs from Altenkirchen via Pracht to Au (Sieg), also lines 285 and 286 serve Pracht.

The Hohe Grete stop should be closed and replaced to a new stop named Pracht Mitte, constructions will begin in 2027, which is located closer to the geographical center of the village. The new Pracht Mitte stop will be barrier free with guiding lines for the blind, loudspeaker announcements as well as stepless access.
