= Oberwambach =

- Municipality
- Coat of arms

- Location of Oberwambach within Altenkirchen district
- Interactive map of Oberwambach
- Location within Germany Location within Rhineland-Palatinate
- Coordinates: 50°39′31″N 7°39′25″E
- Country: Germany
- State: Rhineland-Palatinate
- District: Altenkirchen
- Municipal assoc.: Altenkirchen-Flammersfeld

Government
  - Mayor (2019–24): Hans-Joachim Ramseger

Area
  - Total: 3.99 km^{2} (1.54 sq mi)
- Elevation: 235 m (771 ft)

Population (2025-12-31)
  - Total: 419
  - Density: 105/km^{2} (272/sq mi)
- Time zone: UTC+01:00 (CET)
  - Summer (DST): UTC+02:00 (CEST)
- Postal codes: 57614
- Dialling codes: 02681
- Vehicle registration: AK
- Website: vg-altenkirchen-flammersfeld.de

Oberwambach is a municipality in the district of Altenkirchen, in Rhineland-Palatinate, in western Germany.
