= Brachbach =

- Municipality
- Coat of arms

- Location of Brachbach within Altenkirchen district
- Interactive map of Brachbach
- Location within Germany Location within Rhineland-Palatinate
- Coordinates: 50°49′03″N 7°55′55″E
- Country: Germany
- State: Rhineland-Palatinate
- District: Altenkirchen
- Municipal assoc.: Kirchen (Sieg)

Government
  - Mayor (2019–24): Steffen Kappes (SPD)

Area
  - Total: 6.36 km^{2} (2.46 sq mi)
- Elevation: 267 m (876 ft)

Population (2025-12-31)
  - Total: 2,323
  - Density: 365/km^{2} (946/sq mi)
- Time zone: UTC+01:00 (CET)
  - Summer (DST): UTC+02:00 (CEST)
- Postal codes: 57555
- Dialling codes: 02745
- Vehicle registration: AK
- Website: Brachbach auf der Website der VG Kirchen

Brachbach is a municipality in the district of Altenkirchen, in Rhineland-Palatinate, Germany.

== Clubs and organizations ==
Some clubs, organisations and interest groups located in Brachbach are the Brexbachtalbahn e. V., goal: reactivation of the Engers-Au railway between Engers and Siershahn, the German Red Cross Community Brachbach, the Friends and Supporters Association of the Brachbach Volunteer Fire Department, the Friends and Supporters of Brachbach Primary School and the Local history society "Glück-Auf" Brachbach.

== Transport ==
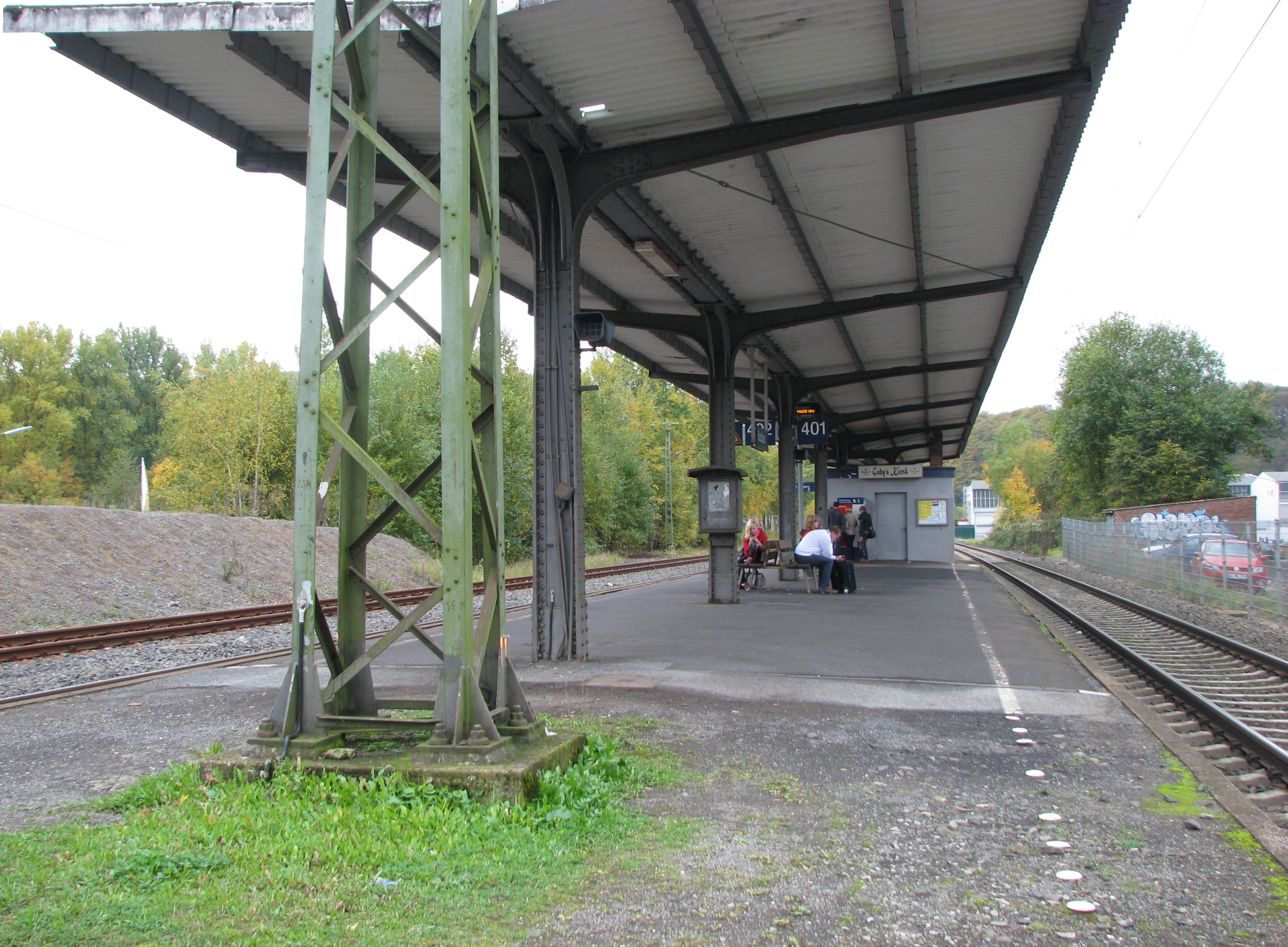
Brachbach train station

Brachbach has a train station on the Sieg Railway and served by the RE9 (Rhein-Sieg-Express), RB90 and RB93 of DreiLänderBahn, a section of Hessische Landesbahn (HLB). Brachbach is served by the local bus lines number 296 and 297 and located in the area of the transport association Verkehrsverbund Rhein-Mosel (VRM) in the zone number 934.
