= Peterslahr =

- Municipality
- Coat of arms

- Location of Peterslahr within Altenkirchen district
- Interactive map of Peterslahr
- Location within Germany Location within Rhineland-Palatinate
- Coordinates: 50°36′47″N 7°28′56″E
- Country: Germany
- State: Rhineland-Palatinate
- District: Altenkirchen
- Municipal assoc.: Altenkirchen-Flammersfeld

Government
  - Mayor (2019–24): Alois Weißenfels

Area
  - Total: 2.32 km^{2} (0.90 sq mi)
- Elevation: 170–293 m (558–961 ft)

Population (2025-12-31)
  - Total: 326
  - Density: 141/km^{2} (364/sq mi)
- Time zone: UTC+01:00 (CET)
  - Summer (DST): UTC+02:00 (CEST)
- Postal codes: 57632
- Dialling codes: 02685
- Vehicle registration: AK
- Website: www.peterslahr.de

Peterslahr (German pronunciation: [ˈpeːtɐslaːɐ̯]) is a municipality in the district of Altenkirchen, in Rhineland-Palatinate, Germany.

== Transport ==
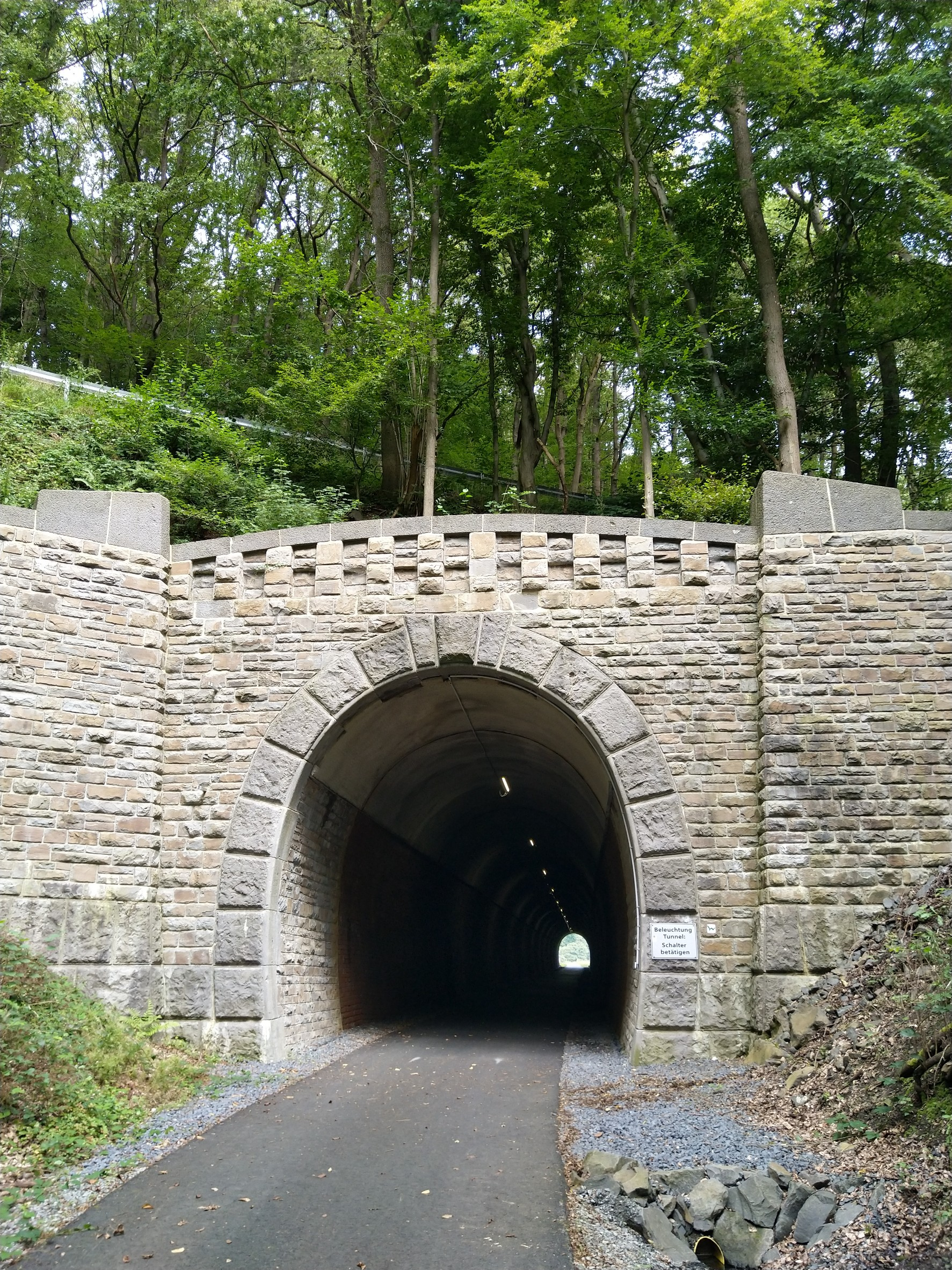
Former tunnel of Kasbachtalbahn in Peterslahr

There is a former stop at the Kasbachtalbahn (Linz (Rhine) - Flammersfeld) in Peterslahr which is out of service today, local busses connect Peterslahr to the public transport. Peterslahr is located in the zone number 904 of the transport association Verkehrsverbund Rhein-Mosel (VRM).
