= Isert =

- Municipality
- Location of Isert within Altenkirchen district
- Interactive map of Isert
- Location within Germany Location within Rhineland-Palatinate
- Coordinates: 50°43′36″N 7°42′12″E
- Country: Germany
- State: Rhineland-Palatinate
- District: Altenkirchen
- Municipal assoc.: Altenkirchen-Flammersfeld

Government
  - Mayor (2019–24): Wolfgang Hörter

Area
  - Total: 1.84 km^{2} (0.71 sq mi)
- Elevation: 294 m (965 ft)

Population (2025-12-31)
  - Total: 114
  - Density: 62.0/km^{2} (160/sq mi)
- Time zone: UTC+01:00 (CET)
  - Summer (DST): UTC+02:00 (CEST)
- Postal codes: 57612
- Dialling codes: 02681, 02682
- Vehicle registration: AK
- Website: www.isert-westerwald.de

Isert is a municipality in the district of Altenkirchen, in Rhineland-Palatinate, in western Germany.

== Transport links ==
The village is served by the local bus line 280 and located in the area of the transport association Verkehrsverbund Rhein-Mosel (VRM), fare zone number 918, Isert also is located at the Marienwanderweg, a walking path leading from Marienstatt Abbey in Streithausen to Marienthal Abbey (Westerwald).
