= Willroth =

- Municipality
- Coat of arms

- Location of Willroth within Altenkirchen district
- Interactive map of Willroth
- Location within Germany Location within Rhineland-Palatinate
- Coordinates: 50°34′05″N 7°31′44″E
- Country: Germany
- State: Rhineland-Palatinate
- District: Altenkirchen
- Municipal assoc.: Altenkirchen-Flammersfeld

Government
  - Mayor (2019–24): Richard Schmitt

Area
  - Total: 1.97 km^{2} (0.76 sq mi)
- Elevation: 368 m (1,207 ft)

Population (2025-12-31)
  - Total: 980
  - Density: 500/km^{2} (1,300/sq mi)
- Time zone: UTC+01:00 (CET)
  - Summer (DST): UTC+02:00 (CEST)
- Postal codes: 56594
- Dialling codes: 02687
- Vehicle registration: AK
- Website: www.willroth.de

Willroth is a municipality in the district of Altenkirchen, in Rhineland-Palatinate, in western Germany.
