= Ölsen =

- Municipality
- Location of Ölsen within Altenkirchen (Westerwald) district
- Interactive map of Ölsen
- Location within Germany Location within Rhineland-Palatinate
- Coordinates: 50°44′19″N 7°36′16″E
- Country: Germany
- State: Rhineland-Palatinate
- District: Altenkirchen (Westerwald)
- Municipal assoc.: Altenkirchen-Flammersfeld

Government
  - Mayor (2019–24): Michael Kirchner

Area
  - Total: 2.26 km^{2} (0.87 sq mi)
- Elevation: 281 m (922 ft)

Population (2025-12-31)
  - Total: 87
  - Density: 38/km^{2} (100/sq mi)
- Time zone: UTC+01:00 (CET)
  - Summer (DST): UTC+02:00 (CEST)
- Postal codes: 57612
- Dialling codes: 02681
- Vehicle registration: AK
- Website: www.dgh-ölsen.de

Ölsen is a municipality in the district of Altenkirchen, in Rhineland-Palatinate, in western Germany.
