= Niedersteinebach =

- Municipality
- Location of Niedersteinebach within Altenkirchen district
- Interactive map of Niedersteinebach
- Location within Germany Location within Rhineland-Palatinate
- Coordinates: 50°36′04″N 7°30′35″E
- Country: Germany
- State: Rhineland-Palatinate
- District: Altenkirchen
- Municipal assoc.: Altenkirchen-Flammersfeld

Government
  - Mayor (2019–24): Dieter Tiefenau

Area
  - Total: 0.79 km^{2} (0.31 sq mi)
- Elevation: 210 m (690 ft)

Population (2025-12-31)
  - Total: 204
  - Density: 260/km^{2} (670/sq mi)
- Time zone: UTC+01:00 (CET)
  - Summer (DST): UTC+02:00 (CEST)
- Postal codes: 56593
- Dialling codes: 02687
- Vehicle registration: AK
- Website: vg-altenkirchen-flammersfeld.de

Niedersteinebach is a municipality in the district of Altenkirchen, in Rhineland-Palatinate, in western Germany.
