= Birnbach =

- Municipality
- Location of Birnbach within Altenkirchen (Westerwald) district
- Interactive map of Birnbach
- Location within Germany Location within Rhineland-Palatinate
- Coordinates: 50°42′13″N 7°35′7″E
- Country: Germany
- State: Rhineland-Palatinate
- District: Altenkirchen (Westerwald)
- Municipal assoc.: Altenkirchen-Flammersfeld

Government
  - Mayor (2019–24): Mario Müller

Area
  - Total: 3.11 km^{2} (1.20 sq mi)
- Elevation: 270 m (890 ft)

Population (2025-12-31)
  - Total: 657
  - Density: 211/km^{2} (547/sq mi)
- Time zone: UTC+01:00 (CET)
  - Summer (DST): UTC+02:00 (CEST)
- Postal codes: 57612
- Dialling codes: 02681
- Vehicle registration: AK
- Website: vg-altenkirchen-flammersfeld.de

Birnbach (German pronunciation: [ˈbɪʁnbax]) is a municipality in the district of Altenkirchen, in Rhineland-Palatinate, Germany.

== Geography ==
=== Location ===
The municipality is located in the Westerwald, about five kilometers northwest of the district town Altenkirchen. From Birnbach, it is about five kilometers to the North Rhine-Westphalian state border.

=== Landscape ===
The village is situated extensively along the village street; characterized by numerous green spaces, streams, and old tree stands in the village area. The very old village center is centered around the Evangelical Church.

=== Neighboring Communities ===
Neighboring villages are Wölmersen to the northeast, Oberölfen to the east, Hemmelzen to the south, and Weyerbusch and Hilkhausen to the west.

== History ==
=== Middle Ages ===
The first documented mention of the village occurred in a papal decree on March 31, 1131. This date was also the occasion for the 850th anniversary celebration held in Birnbach in 1981. However, the settlement of the area is believed to have occurred much earlier. The Birnbach High Court is mentioned as early as 1260 and was the only one in the southeastern part of the Auelgau. Shortly before 1464, it was demanded to be moved to Altenkirchen.

=== World War II ===
Three of the four officers held responsible for the loss of the Ludendorff Bridge (March 7, 1945), sentenced to death on March 13 and 14, 1945, and executed, are buried in the local war cemetery. They are Majors Johann Scheller and August Krafft, as well as Lieutenant Karl-Heinz Peters. Originally, the fourth officer, Major Herbert Strobel, was also buried here; his remains were transferred to his homeland on the request of his son. The officers were sentenced to death by firing squad by a "Flying Tribunal" personally appointed by Hitler in Rimbach and Oberirsen, and executed immediately after the verdict. Field Marshal Model had set up the headquarters of his Army Group B in the Rimbacher Gasthaus "Katzmann." The tribunal, under the command of General Rudolf Huebner, was housed in the Oberirsener Gaststätte "Pick." The fifth officer, Captain Willi Oskar Bratge, had fallen into American captivity during the capture of the Ludendorff Bridge, thus escaping death.

=== Recent History ===
Around 1990, Birnbach gained attention due to a conflict with a group of Bruderhofers who had settled in Birnbach and built a larger community there. A local citizens' initiative worked against the community until 1995 when the Bruderhofers eventually left the village. The properties of the Bruderhofers were taken over by the New Religious Movement Lectorium Rosicrucianum, which opened an administrative and conference center in Birnbach in 2000.

=== Population Development ===
The development of the population of the municipality of Birnbach. The values from 1871 to 1987 are based on censuses.

Year	Population
1815	140
1835	208
1871	252
1905	292
1939	307
1950	391
1961	442

Year	Population
1970	423
1987	460
1997	582
2005	626
2011	599
2017	628
2025	657

== Politics ==
=== Municipal Council ===
The municipal council in Birnbach consists of twelve council members who were elected in a majority vote in the municipal elections on May 26, 2019, and the honorary mayor as chairman.

Mario Müller became the mayor of Birnbach on July 3, 2019.

== Monuments ==
- The Evangelical Parish Church Birnbach dates back to the 13th century. The restoration of the church and tower took place from 1893 to 1900 by architect Ludwig Hofmann, financed by the patron Emil Weyerbusch.
- In the town center stands one of the oldest half-timbered houses in the Altenkirchen district: a former post station from the 16th century.

== Economy ==
Birnbach is a residential community characterized by agriculture. Today, there are still four full-time agricultural enterprises, alongside several local craft businesses, grocery stores, and a publishing house.
