= Walterschen =

- Municipality
- Location of Walterschen within Altenkirchen district
- Interactive map of Walterschen
- Location within Germany Location within Rhineland-Palatinate
- Coordinates: 50°41′14″N 7°33′46″E
- Country: Germany
- State: Rhineland-Palatinate
- District: Altenkirchen
- Municipal assoc.: Altenkirchen-Flammersfeld

Government
  - Mayor (2019–24): Frank-Walter Koch

Area
  - Total: 2.12 km^{2} (0.82 sq mi)
- Elevation: 240 m (790 ft)

Population (2025-12-31)
  - Total: 157
  - Density: 74.1/km^{2} (192/sq mi)
- Time zone: UTC+01:00 (CET)
  - Summer (DST): UTC+02:00 (CEST)
- Postal codes: 57632
- Dialling codes: 02686
- Vehicle registration: AK
- Website: vg-altenkirchen-flammersfeld.de

Walterschen is a municipality in the district of Altenkirchen, in Rhineland-Palatinate, in western Germany.
