= Obererbach =

- Municipality
- Coat of arms

- Location of Obererbach within Altenkirchen district
- Interactive map of Obererbach
- Location within Germany Location within Rhineland-Palatinate
- Coordinates: 50°43′31″N 7°39′31″E
- Country: Germany
- State: Rhineland-Palatinate
- District: Altenkirchen
- Municipal assoc.: Altenkirchen-Flammersfeld

Government
  - Mayor (2019–24): Stefan Löhr

Area
  - Total: 3.63 km^{2} (1.40 sq mi)
- Elevation: 260 m (850 ft)

Population (2025-12-31)
  - Total: 554
  - Density: 153/km^{2} (395/sq mi)
- Time zone: UTC+01:00 (CET)
  - Summer (DST): UTC+02:00 (CEST)
- Postal codes: 57612
- Dialling codes: 02681
- Vehicle registration: AK
- Website: www.obererbach.de

Obererbach is a municipality in the district of Altenkirchen, in Rhineland-Palatinate, in western Germany.

== Transport ==
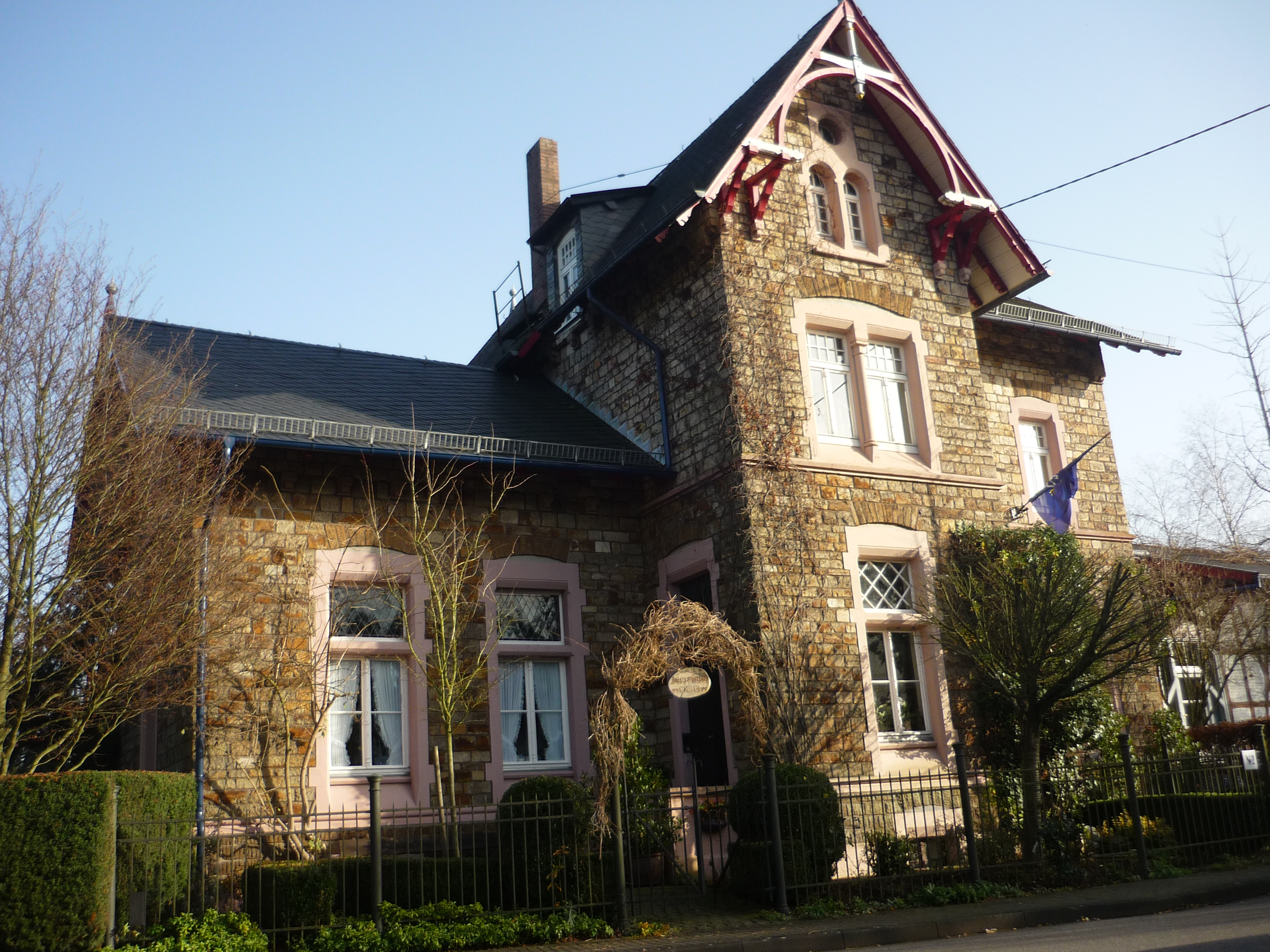
Obererbach railway station

Obererbach train stop is located at the Engers–Au railway line and served by the trains of line RB90 (Westerwald-Sieg-Bahn) of DreiLänderBahn, a section of Hessische Landesbahn (HLB) of the route Limburg (Lahn) - Diez Ost - Westerburg - Hachenburg - Altenkirchen - Au (Sieg) - Betzdorf (Sieg) - Siegen Hbf, it is located on the area of the transport association Verkehrsverbund Rhein-Mosel (VRM), zone 912. Also the local bus line 287 runs in Oberebrach. The village is located on Westerwaldsteig, a long-distance walking path from Herborn via Rennerod, Westerburg, Bad Marienberg and Hachenburg to Bad Hönningen.
