= Ersfeld =

- Municipality
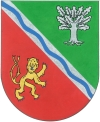
- Coat of arms

- Location of Ersfeld within Altenkirchen district
- Interactive map of Ersfeld
- Location within Germany Location within Rhineland-Palatinate
- Coordinates: 50°41′46″N 07°31′10″E
- Country: Germany
- State: Rhineland-Palatinate
- District: Altenkirchen
- Municipal assoc.: Altenkirchen-Flammersfeld

Government
  - Mayor (2019–24): Christa Hentschel-Verfürth

Area
  - Total: 14.0 km^{2} (5.4 sq mi)
- Elevation: 2,040 m (6,690 ft)

Population (2025-12-31)
  - Total: 72
  - Density: 5.1/km^{2} (13/sq mi)
- Time zone: UTC+01:00 (CET)
  - Summer (DST): UTC+02:00 (CEST)
- Postal codes: 57635
- Dialling codes: 02686
- Vehicle registration: AK
- Website: www.gemeinde-ersfeld.de

Ersfeld is a municipality in the district of Altenkirchen, in Rhineland-Palatinate, Germany.
