= Hemmelzen =

- Municipality
- Coat of arms

- Location of Hemmelzen within Altenkirchen district
- Interactive map of Hemmelzen
- Location within Germany Location within Rhineland-Palatinate
- Coordinates: 50°41′30″N 7°34′47″E
- Country: Germany
- State: Rhineland-Palatinate
- District: Altenkirchen
- Municipal assoc.: Altenkirchen-Flammersfeld

Government
  - Mayor (2019–24): Harald Bischoff

Area
  - Total: 2.83 km^{2} (1.09 sq mi)
- Elevation: 220 m (720 ft)

Population (2025-12-31)
  - Total: 280
  - Density: 99/km^{2} (260/sq mi)
- Time zone: UTC+01:00 (CET)
  - Summer (DST): UTC+02:00 (CEST)
- Postal codes: 57612
- Dialling codes: 02681
- Vehicle registration: AK
- Website: vg-altenkirchen-flammersfeld.de

Hemmelzen is a municipality in the district of Altenkirchen, in Rhineland-Palatinate, in western Germany.

== Transport links ==
Hemmelzen is served by the local bus lines no. 251 and 252 and located in the transport association Verkehrsverbund Rhein-Mosel (VRM), in the zone number 911.
