= Bachenberg =

- Municipality
- Location of Bachenberg within Altenkirchen (Westerwald) district
- Interactive map of Bachenberg
- Location within Germany Location within Rhineland-Palatinate
- Coordinates: 50°42′52″N 7°38′44″E
- Country: Germany
- State: Rhineland-Palatinate
- District: Altenkirchen (Westerwald)
- Municipal assoc.: Altenkirchen-Flammersfeld

Government
  - Mayor (2019–24): Ulrich Becker

Area
  - Total: 1.67 km^{2} (0.64 sq mi)
- Elevation: 297 m (974 ft)

Population (2025-12-31)
  - Total: 88
  - Density: 53/km^{2} (140/sq mi)
- Time zone: UTC+01:00 (CET)
  - Summer (DST): UTC+02:00 (CEST)
- Postal codes: 57610
- Dialling codes: 02681
- Vehicle registration: AK
- Website: vg-altenkirchen-flammersfeld.de

Bachenberg village in the municipality of Altenkirchen-Flammersfeld in the district of Altenkirchen, in Rhineland-Palatinate, Germany.
