= Reiferscheid =

- Municipality
- Location of Reiferscheid within Altenkirchen district
- Interactive map of Reiferscheid
- Location within Germany Location within Rhineland-Palatinate
- Coordinates: 50°39′20″N 7°32′46″E
- Country: Germany
- State: Rhineland-Palatinate
- District: Altenkirchen
- Municipal assoc.: Altenkirchen-Flammersfeld
- Subdivisions: 2

Government
  - Mayor (2019–24): Jahn Michael Schmuck

Area
  - Total: 2.13 km^{2} (0.82 sq mi)
- Elevation: 250 m (820 ft)

Population (2025-12-31)
  - Total: 433
  - Density: 203/km^{2} (527/sq mi)
- Time zone: UTC+01:00 (CET)
  - Summer (DST): UTC+02:00 (CEST)
- Postal codes: 57632
- Dialling codes: 02685
- Vehicle registration: AK
- Website: www.reiferscheid-westerwald.de

Reiferscheid (German pronunciation: [ˈʁaɪfɐʃaɪt]) is a municipality in the district of Altenkirchen, in Rhineland-Palatinate, in western Germany.
