= Eichen =

- Municipality
- Location of Eichen within Altenkirchen district
- Interactive map of Eichen
- Location within Germany Location within Rhineland-Palatinate
- Coordinates: 50°38′6″N 7°31′55″E
- Country: Germany
- State: Rhineland-Palatinate
- District: Altenkirchen
- Municipal assoc.: Altenkirchen-Flammersfeld

Government
  - Mayor (2019–24): Dennis Kolb

Area
  - Total: 4.27 km^{2} (1.65 sq mi)
- Elevation: 275 m (902 ft)

Population (2025-12-31)
  - Total: 533
  - Density: 125/km^{2} (323/sq mi)
- Time zone: UTC+01:00 (CET)
  - Summer (DST): UTC+02:00 (CEST)
- Postal codes: 57632
- Dialling codes: 02685
- Vehicle registration: AK

Eichen (German pronunciation: [ˈaɪçn̩]) is a municipality in the district of Altenkirchen, in Rhineland-Palatinate, Germany.
