= Harbach, Rhineland-Palatinate =

Harbach
- Municipality
- Location of Harbach within Altenkirchen district
- Interactive map of Harbach
- Location within Germany Location within Rhineland-Palatinate
- Coordinates: 50°51′40″N 07°50′49″E
- Country: Germany
- State: Rhineland-Palatinate
- District: Altenkirchen
- Municipal assoc.: Kirchen (Sieg)
- Subdivisions: 3

Government
  - Mayor (2019–24): Andreas Buttgereit

Area
  - Total: 5.63 km^{2} (2.17 sq mi)
- Elevation: 284 m (932 ft)

Population (2025-12-31)
  - Total: 510
  - Density: 91/km^{2} (230/sq mi)
- Time zone: UTC+01:00 (CET)
  - Summer (DST): UTC+02:00 (CEST)
- Postal codes: 57572
- Dialling codes: 02734
- Vehicle registration: AK
- Website: www.kirchen-sieg.de

Harbach is a municipality in the district of Altenkirchen, in Rhineland-Palatinate, Germany.
