= Wölmersen =

- Municipality
- Coat of arms

- Location of Wölmersen within Altenkirchen (Westerwald) district
- Interactive map of Wölmersen
- Location within Germany Location within Rhineland-Palatinate
- Coordinates: 50°42′56″N 7°36′13″E
- Country: Germany
- State: Rhineland-Palatinate
- District: Altenkirchen (Westerwald)
- Municipal assoc.: Altenkirchen-Flammersfeld

Government
  - Mayor (2019–24): Thomas Lindner

Area
  - Total: 2.63 km^{2} (1.02 sq mi)
- Elevation: 285 m (935 ft)

Population (2025-12-31)
  - Total: 373
  - Density: 142/km^{2} (367/sq mi)
- Time zone: UTC+01:00 (CET)
  - Summer (DST): UTC+02:00 (CEST)
- Postal codes: 57635
- Dialling codes: 02681
- Vehicle registration: AK
- Website: vg-altenkirchen-flammersfeld.de

Wölmersen is a municipality in the district of Altenkirchen, in Rhineland-Palatinate, in western Germany.

== Population ==
- 1815 – 74
- 1835 – 128
- 1871 – 166
- 1905 – 168
- 1939 – 203
- 1950 – 223
- 1961 – 232
- 1965 – 262
- 1970 – 258
- 1975 – 241
- 1980 – 261
- 1985 – 335
- 1987 – 324
- 1990 – 383
- 1995 – 408
- 2000 – 412
- 2005 – 445
