= Werkhausen =

- Municipality
- Location of Werkhausen within Altenkirchen district
- Interactive map of Werkhausen
- Location within Germany Location within Rhineland-Palatinate
- Coordinates: 50°43′22″N 7°32′08″E
- Country: Germany
- State: Rhineland-Palatinate
- District: Altenkirchen
- Municipal assoc.: Altenkirchen-Flammersfeld
- Subdivisions: 5

Government
  - Mayor (2019–24): Otmar Orfgen

Area
  - Total: 5.76 km^{2} (2.22 sq mi)
- Elevation: 270 m (890 ft)

Population (2025-12-31)
  - Total: 231
  - Density: 40.1/km^{2} (104/sq mi)
- Time zone: UTC+01:00 (CET)
  - Summer (DST): UTC+02:00 (CEST)
- Postal codes: 57635
- Dialling codes: 02686
- Vehicle registration: AK
- Website: vg-altenkirchen-flammersfeld.de

Werkhausen is a municipality in the district of Altenkirchen, in Rhineland-Palatinate, in western Germany.
