= Forstmehren =

- Municipality
- Location of Forstmehren within Altenkirchen district
- Interactive map of Forstmehren
- Location within Germany Location within Rhineland-Palatinate
- Coordinates: 50°42′N 7°32′E
- Country: Germany
- State: Rhineland-Palatinate
- District: Altenkirchen
- Municipal assoc.: Altenkirchen-Flammersfeld

Government
  - Mayor (2019–24): Steffen Weser

Area
  - Total: 1.61 km^{2} (0.62 sq mi)
- Elevation: 242 m (794 ft)

Population (2025-12-31)
  - Total: 168
  - Density: 104/km^{2} (270/sq mi)
- Time zone: UTC+01:00 (CET)
  - Summer (DST): UTC+02:00 (CEST)
- Postal codes: 57635
- Dialling codes: 02686
- Vehicle registration: AK
- Website: www.forstmehren.de

Forstmehren is a municipality in the district of Altenkirchen, in Rhineland-Palatinate, Germany.
