= Oberirsen =

- Municipality
- Location of Oberirsen within Altenkirchen district
- Interactive map of Oberirsen
- Location within Germany Location within Rhineland-Palatinate
- Coordinates: 50°43′25″N 7°35′16″E
- Country: Germany
- State: Rhineland-Palatinate
- District: Altenkirchen
- Municipal assoc.: Altenkirchen-Flammersfeld

Government
  - Mayor (2019–24): Wilfried Stahl

Area
  - Total: 9.45 km^{2} (3.65 sq mi)
- Elevation: 235 m (771 ft)

Population (2025-12-31)
  - Total: 616
  - Density: 65.2/km^{2} (169/sq mi)
- Time zone: UTC+01:00 (CET)
  - Summer (DST): UTC+02:00 (CEST)
- Postal codes: 57635
- Dialling codes: 02686
- Vehicle registration: AK
- Website: vg-altenkirchen-flammersfeld.de

Oberirsen is a municipality in the district of Altenkirchen, in Rhineland-Palatinate, in western Germany.
