= Güllesheim =

- Municipality
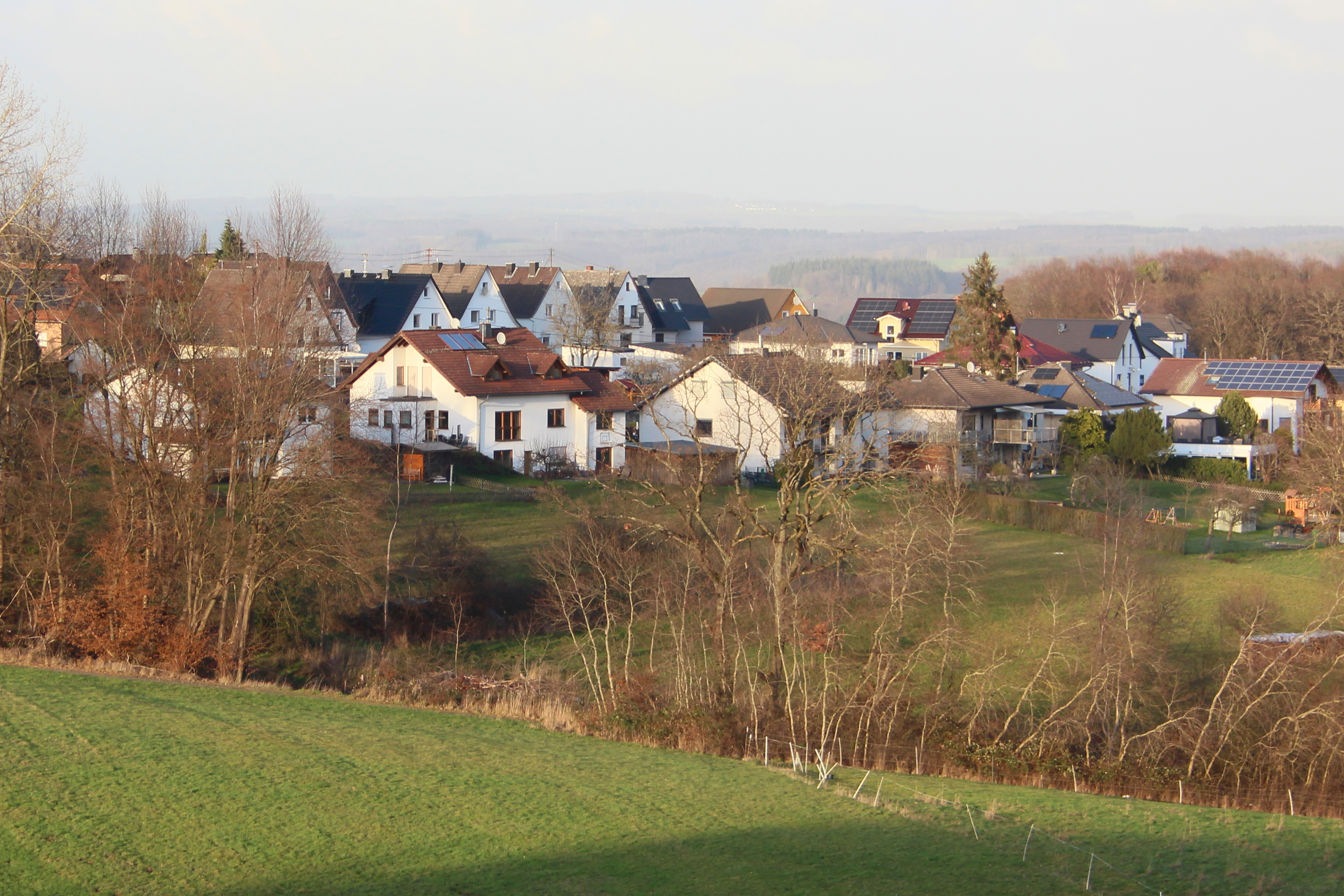

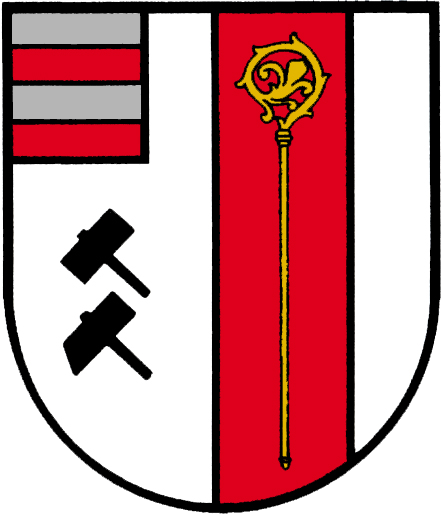
- Coat of arms

- Location of Güllesheim within Altenkirchen (Westerwald) district
- Interactive map of Güllesheim
- Location within Germany Location within Rhineland-Palatinate
- Coordinates: 50°35′52″N 07°31′41″E
- Country: Germany
- State: Rhineland-Palatinate
- District: Altenkirchen (Westerwald)
- Municipal assoc.: Altenkirchen-Flammersfeld
- Subdivisions: 2

Government
  - Mayor (2019–24): Peter Humberg

Area
  - Total: 2.20 km^{2} (0.85 sq mi)
- Elevation: 308 m (1,010 ft)

Population (2025-12-31)
  - Total: 758
  - Density: 345/km^{2} (892/sq mi)
- Time zone: UTC+01:00 (CET)
  - Summer (DST): UTC+02:00 (CEST)
- Postal codes: 56593
- Dialling codes: 02687
- Vehicle registration: AK
- Website: www.güllesheim.de

Güllesheim is a municipality in the district of Altenkirchen, in Rhineland-Palatinate, in western Germany.
