= Volkerzen =

- Municipality
- Coat of arms

- Location of Volkerzen within Altenkirchen district
- Interactive map of Volkerzen
- Location within Germany Location within Rhineland-Palatinate
- Coordinates: 50°43′25″N 7°40′58″E
- Country: Germany
- State: Rhineland-Palatinate
- District: Altenkirchen
- Municipal assoc.: Altenkirchen-Flammersfeld

Government
  - Mayor (2019–24): Knut Eitelberg

Area
  - Total: 1.98 km^{2} (0.76 sq mi)
- Elevation: 270 m (890 ft)

Population (2025-12-31)
  - Total: 68
  - Density: 34/km^{2} (89/sq mi)
- Time zone: UTC+01:00 (CET)
  - Summer (DST): UTC+02:00 (CEST)
- Postal codes: 57612
- Dialling codes: 02681
- Vehicle registration: AK
- Website: www.volkerzen.de

Volkerzen is a municipality in the district of Altenkirchen, in Rhineland-Palatinate, in western Germany.
