= Krunkel =

- Municipality
- Location of Krunkel within Altenkirchen district
- Interactive map of Krunkel
- Location within Germany Location within Rhineland-Palatinate
- Coordinates: 50°34′33″N 7°30′17″E
- Country: Germany
- State: Rhineland-Palatinate
- District: Altenkirchen
- Municipal assoc.: Altenkirchen-Flammersfeld
- Subdivisions: 2

Government
  - Mayor (2019–24): Werner Eul

Area
  - Total: 2.81 km^{2} (1.08 sq mi)
- Elevation: 305 m (1,001 ft)

Population (2025-12-31)
  - Total: 587
  - Density: 209/km^{2} (541/sq mi)
- Time zone: UTC+01:00 (CET)
  - Summer (DST): UTC+02:00 (CEST)
- Postal codes: 56593
- Dialling codes: 02687
- Vehicle registration: AK
- Website: www.gemeinde-krunkel.de

Krunkel is a municipality in the district of Altenkirchen, in Rhineland-Palatinate, in western Germany.
