= Gieleroth =

- Municipality
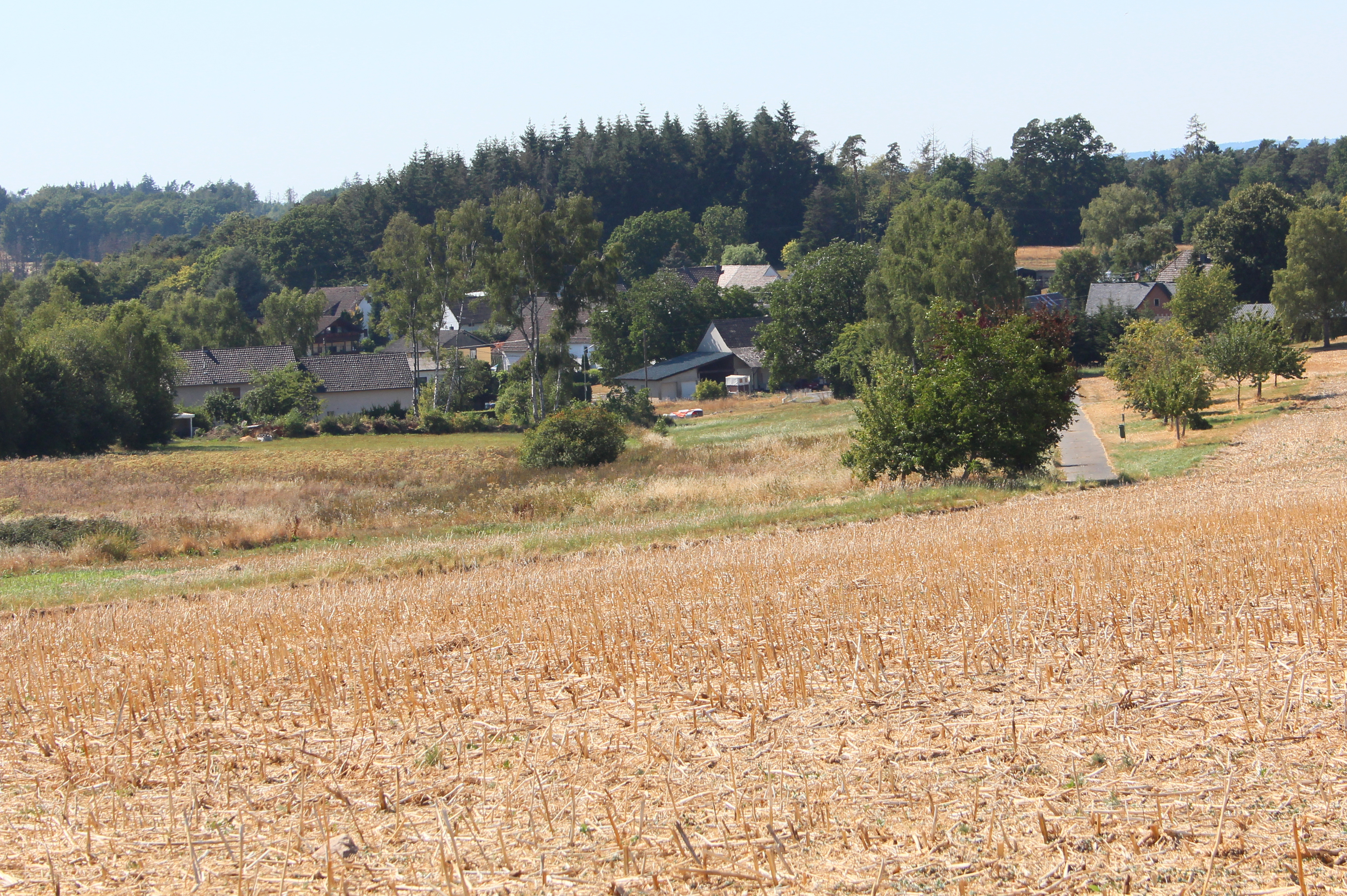

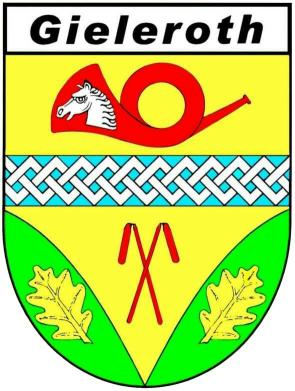
- Coat of arms

- Location of Gieleroth within Altenkirchen district
- Interactive map of Gieleroth
- Location within Germany Location within Rhineland-Palatinate
- Coordinates: 50°40′04″N 7°40′50″E
- Country: Germany
- State: Rhineland-Palatinate
- District: Altenkirchen
- Municipal assoc.: Altenkirchen-Flammersfeld

Government
  - Mayor (2019–24): Katja Schütz

Area
  - Total: 5.92 km^{2} (2.29 sq mi)
- Elevation: 302 m (991 ft)

Population (2025-12-31)
  - Total: 664
  - Density: 112/km^{2} (290/sq mi)
- Time zone: UTC+01:00 (CET)
  - Summer (DST): UTC+02:00 (CEST)
- Postal codes: 57610
- Dialling codes: 02681
- Vehicle registration: AK
- Website: gieleroth.de

Gieleroth is a municipality in the district of Altenkirchen, in Rhineland-Palatinate, in western Germany.
