= Kescheid =

- Municipality
- Location of Kescheid within Altenkirchen district
- Interactive map of Kescheid
- Location within Germany Location within Rhineland-Palatinate
- Coordinates: 50°39′34″N 7°29′32″E
- Country: Germany
- State: Rhineland-Palatinate
- District: Altenkirchen
- Municipal assoc.: Altenkirchen-Flammersfeld

Government
  - Mayor (2019–24): Stefan Fey

Area
  - Total: 4.82 km^{2} (1.86 sq mi)
- Elevation: 245 m (804 ft)

Population (2025-12-31)
  - Total: 129
  - Density: 26.8/km^{2} (69.3/sq mi)
- Time zone: UTC+01:00 (CET)
  - Summer (DST): UTC+02:00 (CEST)
- Postal codes: 57632
- Dialling codes: 02685
- Vehicle registration: AK
- Website: vg-altenkirchen-flammersfeld.de

Kescheid is a municipality in the district of Altenkirchen, in Rhineland-Palatinate, in western Germany.
