= Idelberg =

- Municipality
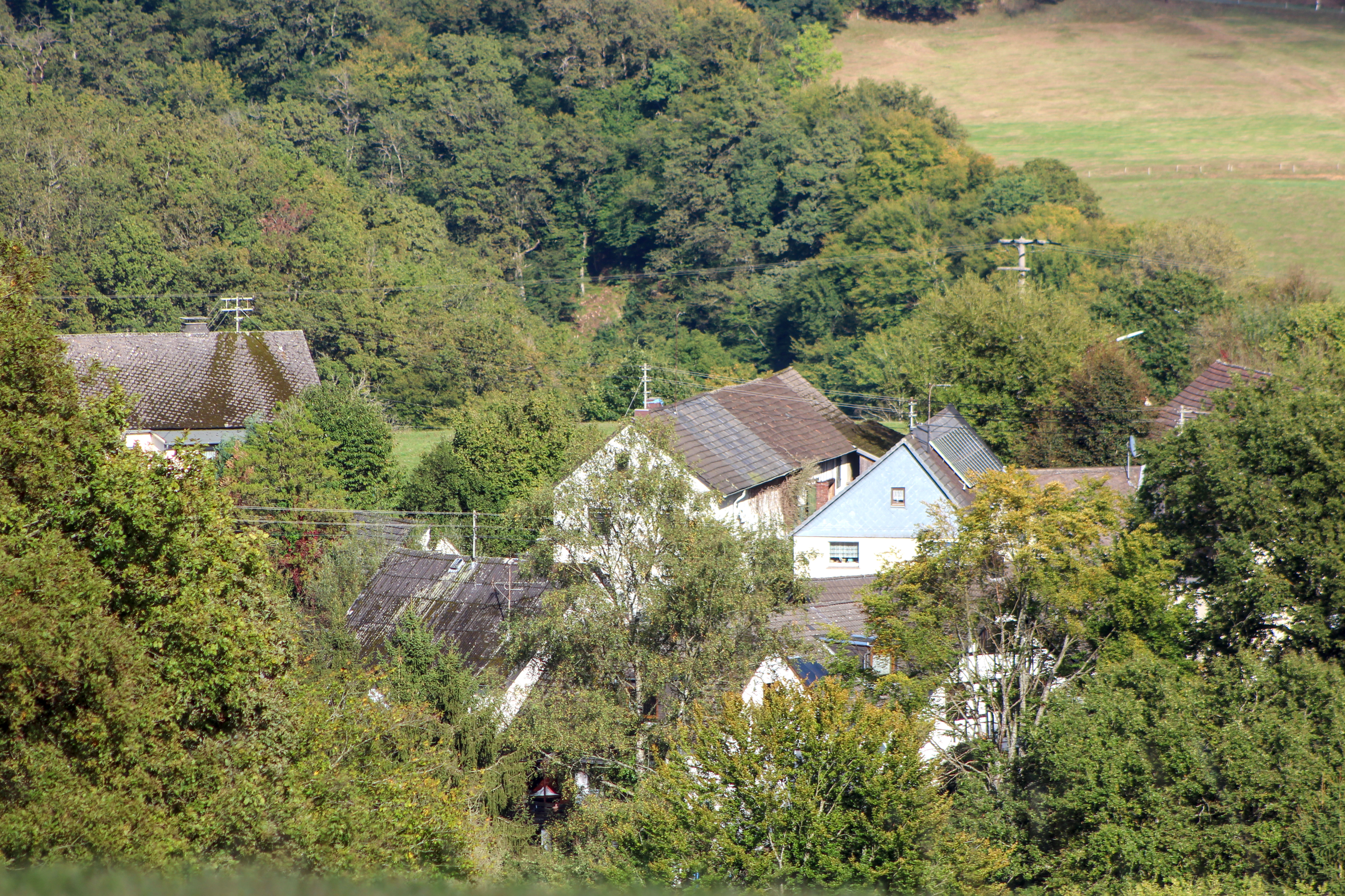

- Location of Idelberg within Altenkirchen district
- Interactive map of Idelberg
- Location within Germany Location within Rhineland-Palatinate
- Coordinates: 50°43′16″N 7°43′35″E
- Country: Germany
- State: Rhineland-Palatinate
- District: Altenkirchen
- Municipal assoc.: Altenkirchen-Flammersfeld

Government
  - Mayor (2019–24): Karl-Heinz Henn

Area
  - Total: 1.13 km^{2} (0.44 sq mi)
- Elevation: 288 m (945 ft)

Population (2025-12-31)
  - Total: 60
  - Density: 53/km^{2} (140/sq mi)
- Time zone: UTC+01:00 (CET)
  - Summer (DST): UTC+02:00 (CEST)
- Postal codes: 57612
- Dialling codes: 02681
- Vehicle registration: AK
- Website: vg-altenkirchen-flammersfeld.de

Idelberg is a municipality in the district of Altenkirchen, in Rhineland-Palatinate, in western Germany.

== Transport links ==
Idelberg is served by the local bus line 280 (Altenkirchen - Eichelhardt - Roth - Wissen) and located in the area of the transport association Verkehrsverbund Rhein-Mosel (VRM), zone number 912. Idelberg is located at the Marienwanderweg, a walking path leading from Marienstatt Abbey in Streithausen to Marienthal Abbey (Westerwald).
