= Kraam =

- Municipality
- Coat of arms

- Location of Kraam within Altenkirchen (Westerwald) district
- Interactive map of Kraam
- Location within Germany Location within Rhineland-Palatinate
- Coordinates: 50°41′35″N 7°32′01″E
- Country: Germany
- State: Rhineland-Palatinate
- District: Altenkirchen (Westerwald)
- Municipal assoc.: Altenkirchen-Flammersfeld
- Subdivisions: 2

Government
  - Mayor (2019–24): Thomas Bay

Area
  - Total: 2.73 km^{2} (1.05 sq mi)
- Elevation: 250 m (820 ft)

Population (2025-12-31)
  - Total: 162
  - Density: 59.3/km^{2} (154/sq mi)
- Time zone: UTC+01:00 (CET)
  - Summer (DST): UTC+02:00 (CEST)
- Postal codes: 57635
- Dialling codes: 02686
- Vehicle registration: AK
- Website: vg-altenkirchen-flammersfeld.de

Kraam is a municipality in the district of Altenkirchen, in Rhineland-Palatinate, western Germany.
