= Helmeroth =

- Municipality
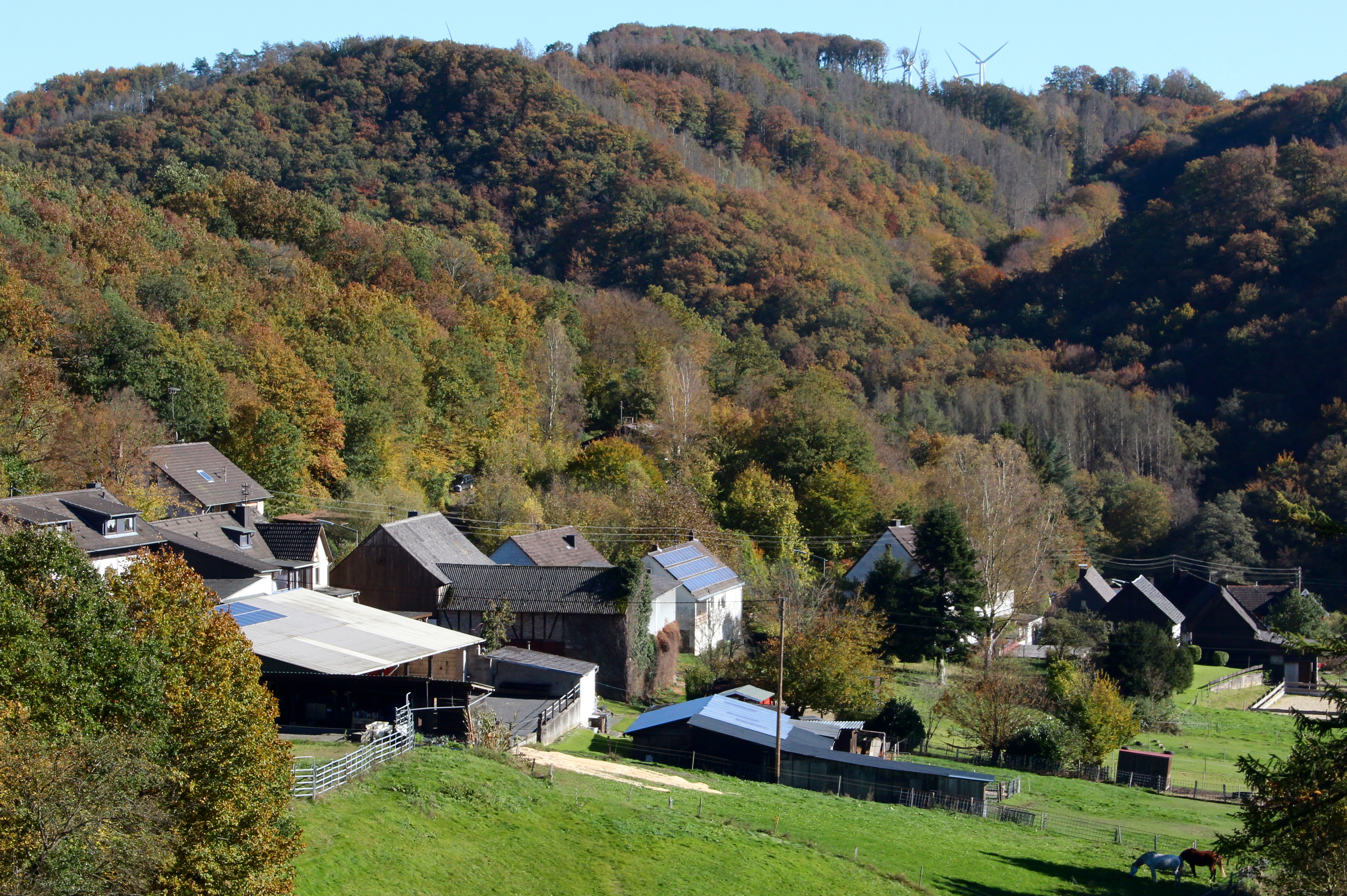

- Location of Helmeroth within Altenkirchen district
- Interactive map of Helmeroth
- Location within Germany Location within Rhineland-Palatinate
- Coordinates: 50°44′27″N 7°44′12″E
- Country: Germany
- State: Rhineland-Palatinate
- District: Altenkirchen
- Municipal assoc.: Altenkirchen-Flammersfeld
- Subdivisions: 5

Government
  - Mayor (2019–24): Paul Stefes

Area
  - Total: 3.57 km^{2} (1.38 sq mi)
- Elevation: 180 m (590 ft)

Population (2025-12-31)
  - Total: 219
  - Density: 61.3/km^{2} (159/sq mi)
- Time zone: UTC+01:00 (CET)
  - Summer (DST): UTC+02:00 (CEST)
- Postal codes: 57612
- Dialling codes: 02682
- Vehicle registration: AK
- Website: vg-altenkirchen-flammersfeld.de

Helmeroth is a municipality in the district of Altenkirchen, in Rhineland-Palatinate, in western Germany.
