= Bürdenbach =

- Municipality
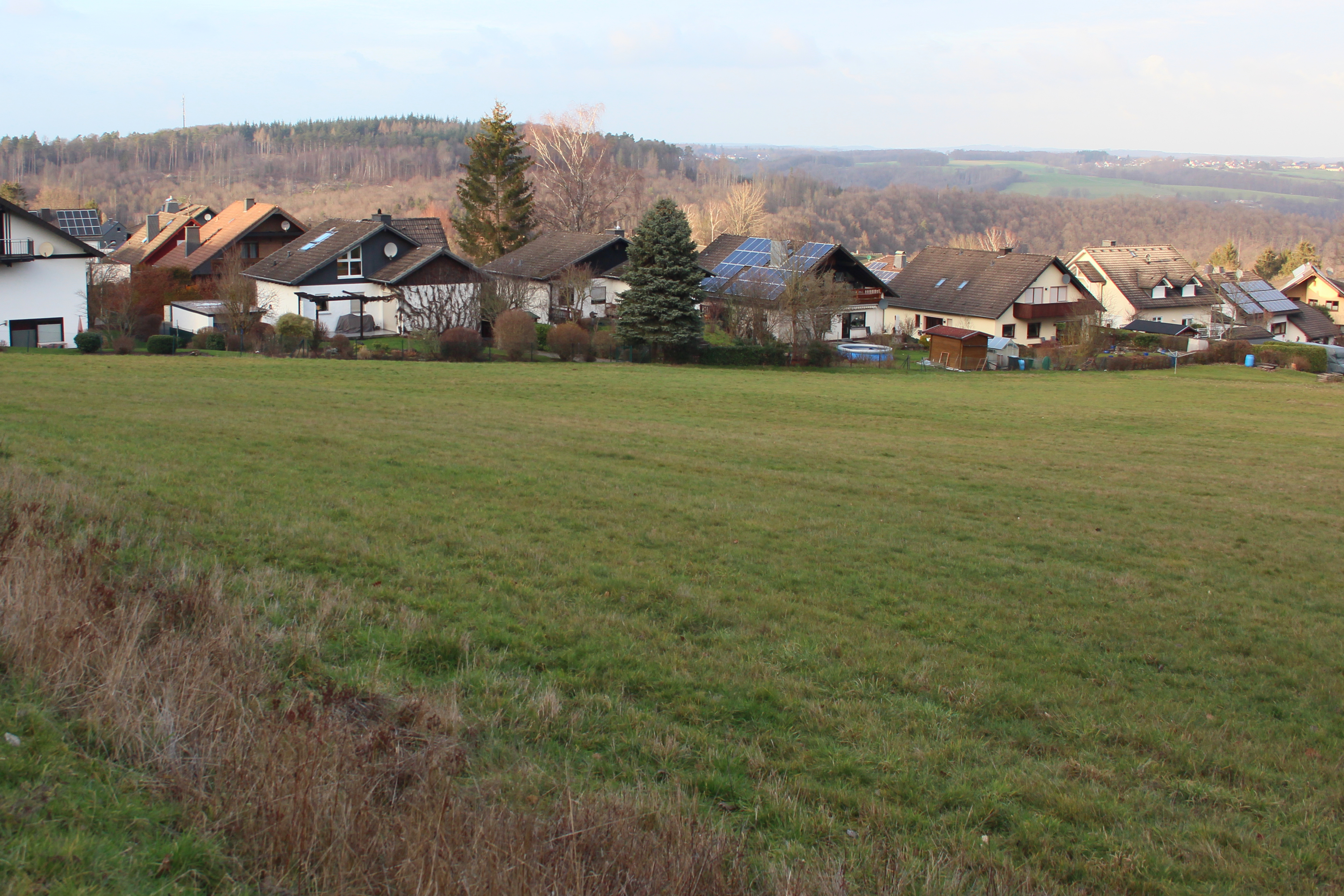

- Location of Bürdenbach within Altenkirchen (Westerwald) district
- Interactive map of Bürdenbach
- Location within Germany Location within Rhineland-Palatinate
- Coordinates: 50°36′15″N 7°31′0″E
- Country: Germany
- State: Rhineland-Palatinate
- District: Altenkirchen (Westerwald)
- Municipal assoc.: Altenkirchen-Flammersfeld

Government
  - Mayor (2019–24): Roswitha Puderbach

Area
  - Total: 2.81 km^{2} (1.08 sq mi)
- Elevation: 250 m (820 ft)

Population (2025-12-31)
  - Total: 617
  - Density: 220/km^{2} (569/sq mi)
- Time zone: UTC+01:00 (CET)
  - Summer (DST): UTC+02:00 (CEST)
- Postal codes: 56593
- Dialling codes: 02687
- Vehicle registration: AK
- Website: vg-altenkirchen-flammersfeld.de

Bürdenbach is a municipality in the district of Altenkirchen, in Rhineland-Palatinate, Germany.
