= Mammelzen =

- Municipality
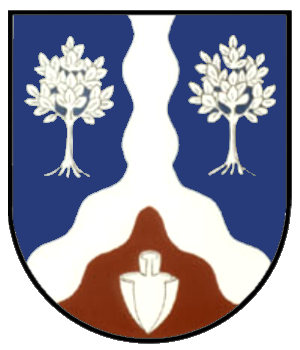
- Coat of arms

- Location of Mammelzen within Altenkirchen district
- Interactive map of Mammelzen
- Location within Germany Location within Rhineland-Palatinate
- Coordinates: 50°42′06″N 7°40′04″E
- Country: Germany
- State: Rhineland-Palatinate
- District: Altenkirchen
- Municipal assoc.: Altenkirchen-Flammersfeld

Government
  - Mayor (2019–24): Dieter Rütscher

Area
  - Total: 4.12 km^{2} (1.59 sq mi)
- Elevation: 240 m (790 ft)

Population (2025-12-31)
  - Total: 1,016
  - Density: 247/km^{2} (639/sq mi)
- Time zone: UTC+01:00 (CET)
  - Summer (DST): UTC+02:00 (CEST)
- Postal codes: 57636
- Dialling codes: 02681
- Vehicle registration: AK
- Website: vg-altenkirchen-flammersfeld.de

Mammelzen is a municipality in the district of Altenkirchen, in Rhineland-Palatinate, in western Germany.
