= Ingelbach =

- Municipality
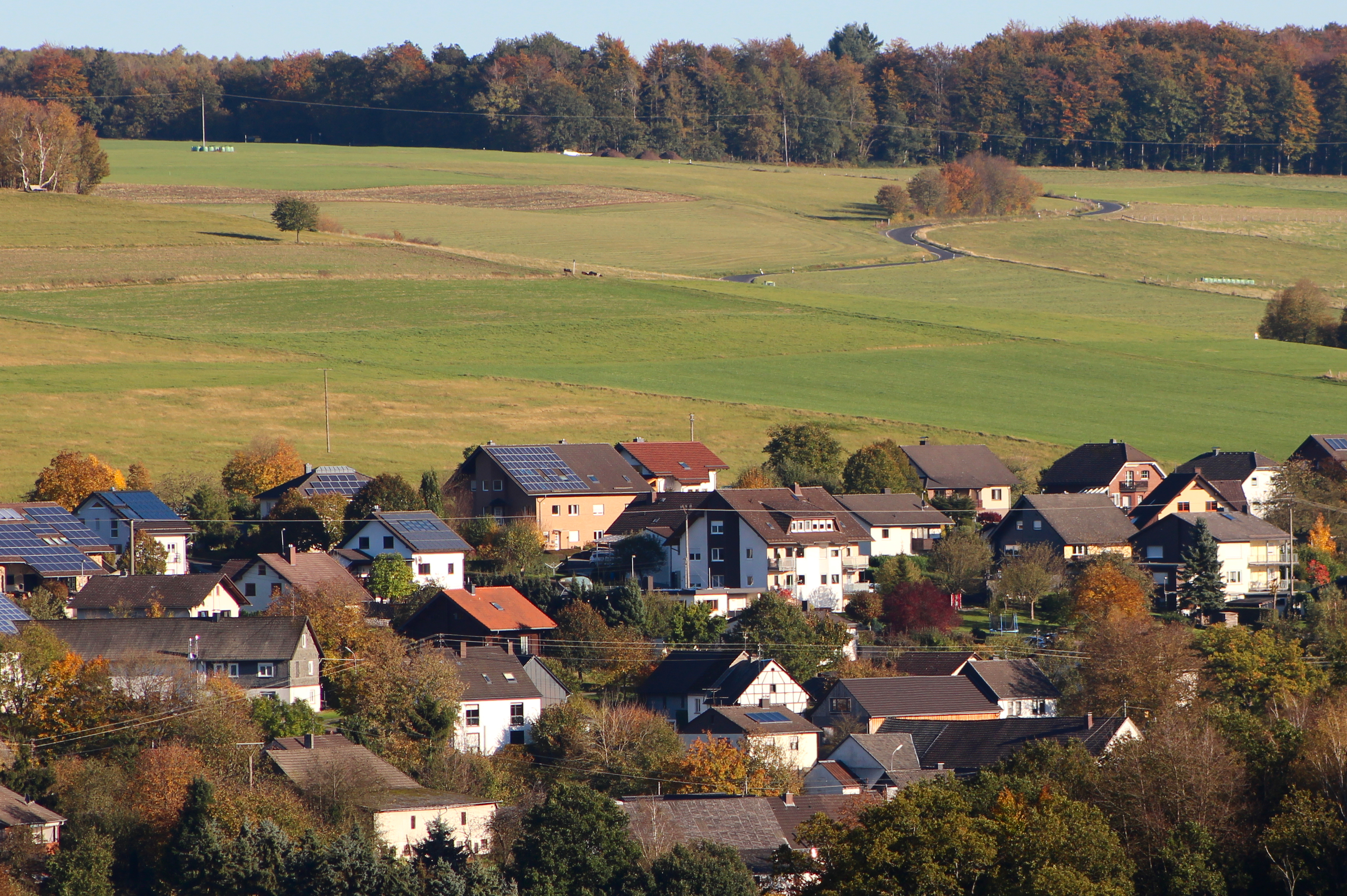

- Location of Ingelbach within Altenkirchen district
- Interactive map of Ingelbach
- Location within Germany Location within Rhineland-Palatinate
- Coordinates: 50°41′02″N 7°42′28″E
- Country: Germany
- State: Rhineland-Palatinate
- District: Altenkirchen
- Municipal assoc.: Altenkirchen-Flammersfeld

Government
  - Mayor (2019–24): Dirk Vohl

Area
  - Total: 5.08 km^{2} (1.96 sq mi)
- Elevation: 255 m (837 ft)

Population (2025-12-31)
  - Total: 512
  - Density: 101/km^{2} (261/sq mi)
- Time zone: UTC+01:00 (CET)
  - Summer (DST): UTC+02:00 (CEST)
- Postal codes: 57610
- Dialling codes: 02688
- Vehicle registration: AK
- Website: www.ingelbach.de

Ingelbach is a municipality in the district of Altenkirchen, in Rhineland-Palatinate, in western Germany.

== Transport ==
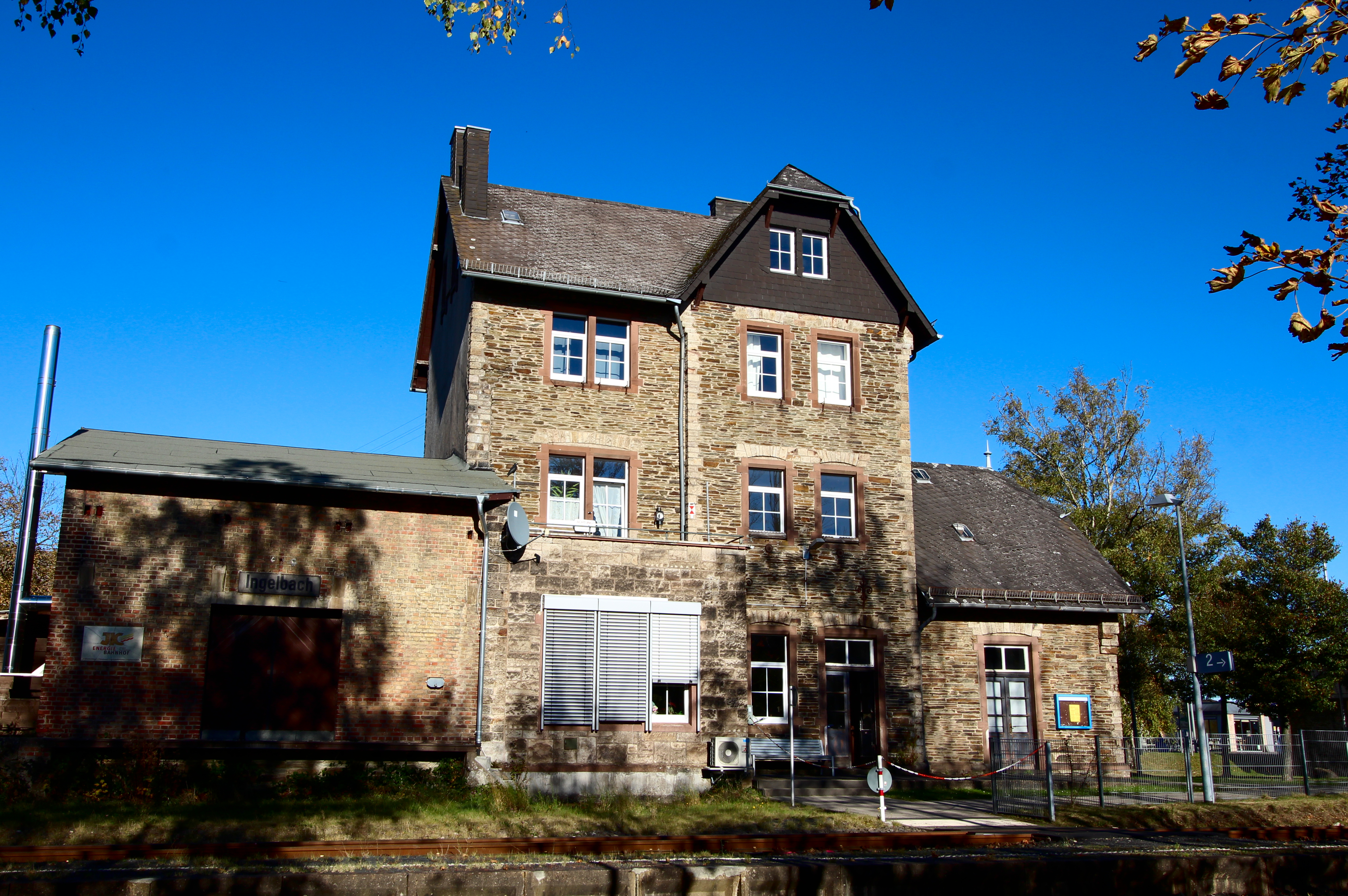
Ingelbach train station

The Ingelbach train station is located at the border of Ingelbach and Kroppach and served by the local trains of the RB90 line (Westerwald-Sieg-railway of DreiLänderBahn, a section of Hessische Landesbahn (HLB) it is located in the zones 450 and 909 of the transport association Verkehrsverbund Rhein-Mosel (VRM). Ingelbach train station also hosts a Bike and ride facility as well as a Park and ride lot.
