= Fiersbach =

- Municipality
- Location of Fiersbach within Altenkirchen district
- Interactive map of Fiersbach
- Location within Germany Location within Rhineland-Palatinate
- Coordinates: 50°41′54″N 7°29′44″E
- Country: Germany
- State: Rhineland-Palatinate
- District: Altenkirchen
- Municipal assoc.: Altenkirchen-Flammersfeld

Government
  - Mayor (2019–24): Carsten Pauly

Area
  - Total: 3.04 km^{2} (1.17 sq mi)
- Elevation: 270 m (890 ft)

Population (2025-12-31)
  - Total: 275
  - Density: 90.5/km^{2} (234/sq mi)
- Time zone: UTC+01:00 (CET)
  - Summer (DST): UTC+02:00 (CEST)
- Postal codes: 57635
- Dialling codes: 02686
- Vehicle registration: AK
- Website: www.fiersbach-ak.de

Fiersbach is a municipality in the district of Altenkirchen, in Rhineland-Palatinate, Germany.
