= Giershausen =

- Municipality
- Location of Giershausen within Altenkirchen (Westerwald) district
- Interactive map of Giershausen
- Location within Germany Location within Rhineland-Palatinate
- Coordinates: 50°40′52″N 7°32′46″E
- Country: Germany
- State: Rhineland-Palatinate
- District: Altenkirchen (Westerwald)
- Municipal assoc.: Altenkirchen-Flammersfeld

Area
  - Total: 2.11 km^{2} (0.81 sq mi)
- Elevation: 275 m (902 ft)

Population (2025-12-31)
  - Total: 102
  - Density: 48.3/km^{2} (125/sq mi)
- Time zone: UTC+01:00 (CET)
  - Summer (DST): UTC+02:00 (CEST)
- Postal codes: 57632
- Dialling codes: 02685
- Vehicle registration: AK
- Website: vg-altenkirchen-flammersfeld.de

Giershausen is a municipality in the district of Altenkirchen, in Rhineland-Palatinate, in western Germany.
