= Weyerbusch =

- Municipality
- Location of Weyerbusch within Altenkirchen district
- Interactive map of Weyerbusch
- Location within Germany Location within Rhineland-Palatinate
- Coordinates: 50°42′57″N 7°33′20″E
- Country: Germany
- State: Rhineland-Palatinate
- District: Altenkirchen
- Municipal assoc.: Altenkirchen-Flammersfeld

Government
  - Mayor (2019–24): Dietmar Winhold

Area
  - Total: 4.22 km^{2} (1.63 sq mi)
- Elevation: 300 m (980 ft)

Population (2025-12-31)
  - Total: 1,504
  - Density: 356/km^{2} (923/sq mi)
- Time zone: UTC+01:00 (CET)
  - Summer (DST): UTC+02:00 (CEST)
- Postal codes: 57635
- Dialling codes: 02686
- Vehicle registration: AK

Weyerbusch is a municipality in the district of Altenkirchen, in Rhineland-Palatinate, in western Germany.
