= Stürzelbach =

- Municipality
- Location of Stürzelbach within Altenkirchen (Westerwald) district
- Interactive map of Stürzelbach
- Location within Germany Location within Rhineland-Palatinate
- Coordinates: 50°39′07″N 7°36′56″E
- Country: Germany
- State: Rhineland-Palatinate
- District: Altenkirchen (Westerwald)
- Municipal assoc.: Altenkirchen-Flammersfeld
- Subdivisions: 4

Government
  - Mayor (2019–24): Jessica Albus

Area
  - Total: 1.77 km^{2} (0.68 sq mi)
- Elevation: 280 m (920 ft)

Population (2025-12-31)
  - Total: 218
  - Density: 123/km^{2} (319/sq mi)
- Time zone: UTC+01:00 (CET)
  - Summer (DST): UTC+02:00 (CEST)
- Postal codes: 57614
- Dialling codes: 02681
- Vehicle registration: AK

Stürzelbach is a municipality in the district of Altenkirchen, in Rhineland-Palatinate, in western Germany.
