= Pleckhausen =

- Municipality
- Coat of arms

- Location of Pleckhausen within Altenkirchen district
- Interactive map of Pleckhausen
- Location within Germany Location within Rhineland-Palatinate
- Coordinates: 50°35′49″N 7°32′37″E
- Country: Germany
- State: Rhineland-Palatinate
- District: Altenkirchen
- Municipal assoc.: Altenkirchen-Flammersfeld

Government
  - Mayor (2019–24): Ludger Heßeler

Area
  - Total: 1.99 km^{2} (0.77 sq mi)
- Elevation: 305 m (1,001 ft)

Population (2025-12-31)
  - Total: 855
  - Density: 430/km^{2} (1,110/sq mi)
- Time zone: UTC+01:00 (CET)
  - Summer (DST): UTC+02:00 (CEST)
- Postal codes: 56593
- Dialling codes: 02687
- Vehicle registration: AK
- Website: www.pleckhausen.de

Pleckhausen is a municipality in the district of Altenkirchen, in Rhineland-Palatinate, in western Germany.
