= Fluterschen =

- Municipality
- Location of Fluterschen within Altenkirchen district
- Interactive map of Fluterschen
- Location within Germany Location within Rhineland-Palatinate
- Coordinates: 50°40′00″N 7°37′36″E
- Country: Germany
- State: Rhineland-Palatinate
- District: Altenkirchen
- Municipal assoc.: Altenkirchen-Flammersfeld

Government
  - Mayor (2019–24): Ralf Lichtenthäler

Area
  - Total: 3.36 km^{2} (1.30 sq mi)
- Elevation: 270 m (890 ft)

Population (2025-12-31)
  - Total: 632
  - Density: 188/km^{2} (487/sq mi)
- Time zone: UTC+01:00 (CET)
  - Summer (DST): UTC+02:00 (CEST)
- Postal codes: 57614
- Dialling codes: 02681
- Vehicle registration: AK
- Website: www.fluterschen.de

Fluterschen is a municipality in the district of Altenkirchen, in Rhineland-Palatinate, Germany.

Early in 2011, the discovery of a child abuse case going on for years brought Fluterschen nationwide headlines across Germany, and to a lesser extent, internationally.

== Transport ==
Fluterschen is connected to the local bus lines 121, 122 and 126 and located in the area of the transport association Verkehrsverbund Rhein-Mosel (VRM), zone no. 905. Nearest train station is Altenkirchen (Westerw) station.
