= Sörth =

- Municipality
- Location of Sörth within Altenkirchen (Westerwald) district
- Interactive map of Sörth
- Location within Germany Location within Rhineland-Palatinate
- Coordinates: 50°42′01″N 7°41′11″E
- Country: Germany
- State: Rhineland-Palatinate
- District: Altenkirchen (Westerwald)
- Municipal assoc.: Altenkirchen-Flammersfeld

Government
  - Mayor (2019–24): Walter Fischer

Area
  - Total: 1.99 km^{2} (0.77 sq mi)
- Elevation: 250 m (820 ft)

Population (2025-12-31)
  - Total: 262
  - Density: 132/km^{2} (341/sq mi)
- Time zone: UTC+01:00 (CET)
  - Summer (DST): UTC+02:00 (CEST)
- Postal codes: 57636
- Dialling codes: 02681
- Vehicle registration: AK
- Website: vg-altenkirchen-flammersfeld.de

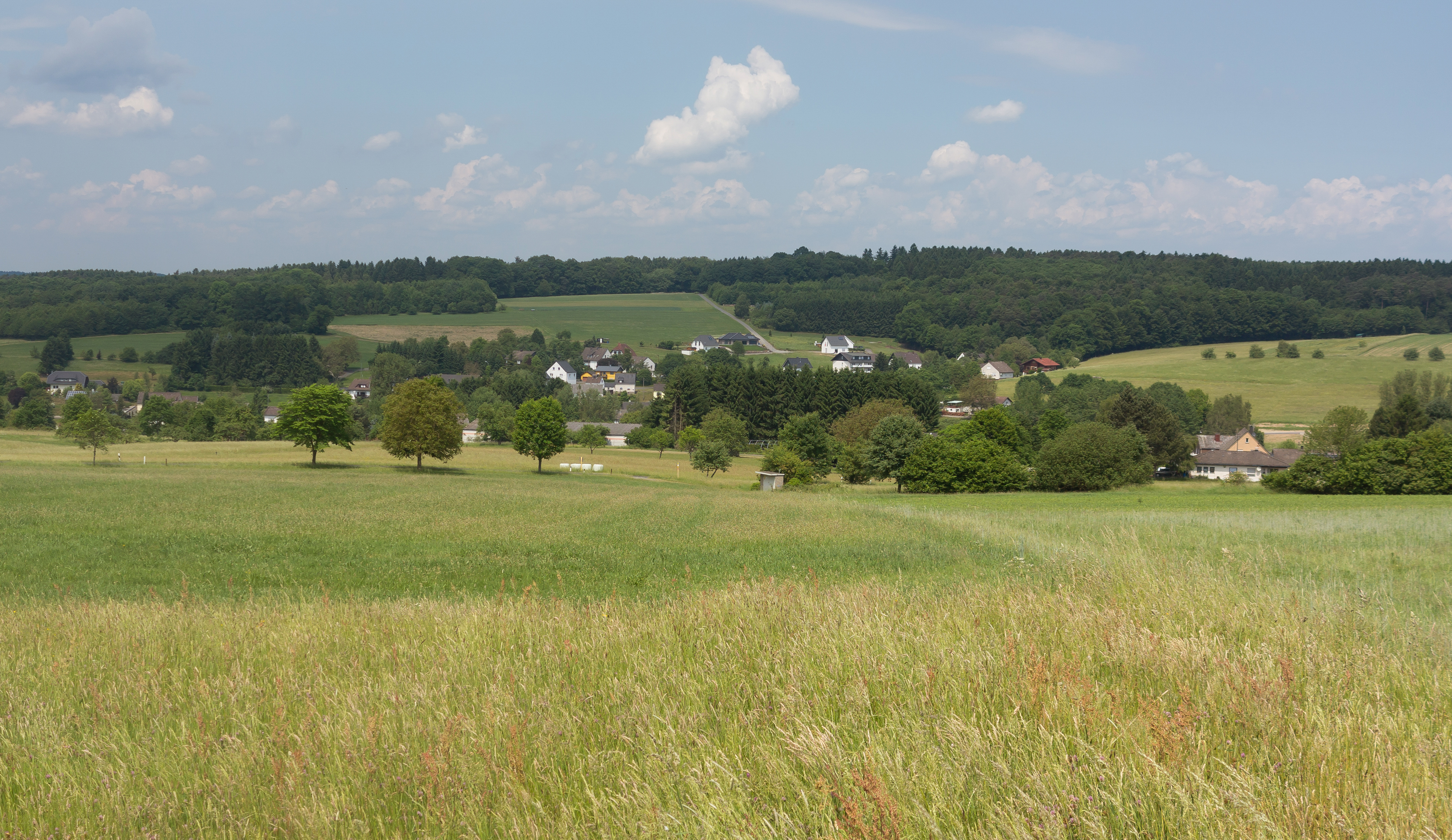
Söhrt, view to the village

Sörth is a municipality in the district of Altenkirchen, in Rhineland-Palatinate, in western Germany.
