= Schürdt =

- Municipality
- Location of Schürdt within Altenkirchen (Westerwald) district
- Interactive map of Schürdt
- Location within Germany Location within Rhineland-Palatinate
- Coordinates: 50°39′56″N 7°33′10″E
- Country: Germany
- State: Rhineland-Palatinate
- District: Altenkirchen (Westerwald)
- Municipal assoc.: Altenkirchen-Flammersfeld

Government
  - Mayor (2019–24): Klaus Wiesemann

Area
  - Total: 2.01 km^{2} (0.78 sq mi)
- Elevation: 245 m (804 ft)

Population (2025-12-31)
  - Total: 278
  - Density: 138/km^{2} (358/sq mi)
- Time zone: UTC+01:00 (CET)
  - Summer (DST): UTC+02:00 (CEST)
- Postal codes: 57632
- Dialling codes: 02685
- Vehicle registration: AK
- Website: vg-altenkirchen-flammersfeld.de

Schürdt (German pronunciation: [ʃʏʁt]) is a municipality in the district of Altenkirchen, in Rhineland-Palatinate, in western Germany.
