= Busenhausen =

- Municipality
- Location of Busenhausen within Altenkirchen district
- Interactive map of Busenhausen
- Location within Germany Location within Rhineland-Palatinate
- Coordinates: 50°43′N 07°38′E
- Country: Germany
- State: Rhineland-Palatinate
- District: Altenkirchen
- Municipal assoc.: Altenkirchen-Flammersfeld
- Subdivisions: 2

Government
  - Mayor (2019–24): Wolfgang Eichelhardt

Area
  - Total: 3.02 km^{2} (1.17 sq mi)
- Elevation: 250–285 m (820–935 ft)

Population (2025-12-31)
  - Total: 346
  - Density: 115/km^{2} (297/sq mi)
- Time zone: UTC+01:00 (CET)
  - Summer (DST): UTC+02:00 (CEST)
- Postal codes: 57612
- Dialling codes: 02681
- Vehicle registration: AK
- Website: www.busenhausen.de

Busenhausen is a municipality in the district of Altenkirchen, in Rhineland-Palatinate, Germany.
