= Obersteinebach =

- Municipality
- Location of Obersteinebach within Altenkirchen district
- Interactive map of Obersteinebach
- Location within Germany Location within Rhineland-Palatinate
- Coordinates: 50°35′27″N 7°29′56″E
- Country: Germany
- State: Rhineland-Palatinate
- District: Altenkirchen
- Municipal assoc.: Altenkirchen-Flammersfeld

Government
  - Mayor (2019–24): Gisbert Groß

Area
  - Total: 3.32 km^{2} (1.28 sq mi)
- Elevation: 260 m (850 ft)

Population (2025-12-31)
  - Total: 233
  - Density: 70.2/km^{2} (182/sq mi)
- Time zone: UTC+01:00 (CET)
  - Summer (DST): UTC+02:00 (CEST)
- Postal codes: 56593
- Dialling codes: 02687
- Vehicle registration: AK
- Website: www.obersteinebach.de

Obersteinebach is a municipality in the district of Altenkirchen, in Rhineland-Palatinate, in western Germany.
