= Kettenhausen =

- Municipality
- Location of Kettenhausen within Altenkirchen district
- Interactive map of Kettenhausen
- Location within Germany Location within Rhineland-Palatinate
- Coordinates: 50°42′35″N 7°37′41″E
- Country: Germany
- State: Rhineland-Palatinate
- District: Altenkirchen
- Municipal assoc.: Altenkirchen-Flammersfeld

Government
  - Mayor (2019–24): Uwe Krauskopf

Area
  - Total: 1.68 km^{2} (0.65 sq mi)
- Elevation: 265 m (869 ft)

Population (2025-12-31)
  - Total: 341
  - Density: 203/km^{2} (526/sq mi)
- Time zone: UTC+01:00 (CET)
  - Summer (DST): UTC+02:00 (CEST)
- Postal codes: 57612
- Dialling codes: 02681
- Vehicle registration: AK
- Website: vg-altenkirchen-flammersfeld.de

Kettenhausen is a municipality in the district of Altenkirchen, in Rhineland-Palatinate, in western Germany.
