= Rott, Rhineland-Palatinate =

Rott
- Municipality
- Location of Rott within Altenkirchen district
- Interactive map of Rott
- Location within Germany Location within Rhineland-Palatinate
- Coordinates: 50°38′11″N 7°30′51″E
- Country: Germany
- State: Rhineland-Palatinate
- District: Altenkirchen
- Municipal assoc.: Altenkirchen-Flammersfeld

Government
  - Mayor (2019–24): Hagen Schneider

Area
  - Total: 9.8 km^{2} (3.8 sq mi)
- Elevation: 283 m (928 ft)

Population (2025-12-31)
  - Total: 408
  - Density: 42/km^{2} (110/sq mi)
- Time zone: UTC+01:00 (CET)
  - Summer (DST): UTC+02:00 (CEST)
- Postal codes: 57632
- Dialling codes: 02685
- Vehicle registration: AK
- Website: www.rott-westerwald.de

Rott (German pronunciation: [ʁɔt]) is a municipality in the district of Altenkirchen, in Rhineland-Palatinate, Germany.
