= Orfgen =

- Municipality
- Location of Orfgen within Altenkirchen district
- Interactive map of Orfgen
- Location within Germany Location within Rhineland-Palatinate
- Coordinates: 50°39′52″N 7°31′59″E
- Country: Germany
- State: Rhineland-Palatinate
- District: Altenkirchen
- Municipal assoc.: Altenkirchen-Flammersfeld

Government
  - Mayor (2019–24): Michael Deisting

Area
  - Total: 3.74 km^{2} (1.44 sq mi)
- Elevation: 240 m (790 ft)

Population (2025-12-31)
  - Total: 227
  - Density: 60.7/km^{2} (157/sq mi)
- Time zone: UTC+01:00 (CET)
  - Summer (DST): UTC+02:00 (CEST)
- Postal codes: 57632
- Dialling codes: 02685
- Vehicle registration: AK
- Website: vg-altenkirchen-flammersfeld.de

Orfgen is a municipality in the district of Altenkirchen, in Rhineland-Palatinate, in western Germany.
