= Altenkirchen (district) =

Coordinates: 50°45′N 7°45′E

- District
- Flag Coat of arms
- Country: Germany
- State: Rhineland-Palatinate
- Capital: Altenkirchen

Government
  - District admin.: Peter Enders (CDU)

Area
  - Total: 642 km^{2} (248 sq mi)

Population (31 December 2025)
  - Total: 132,055
  - Density: 206/km^{2} (533/sq mi)
- Time zone: UTC+01:00 (CET)
  - Summer (DST): UTC+02:00 (CEST)
- Vehicle registration: AK
- Website: kreis-altenkirchen.de

Altenkirchen (German pronunciation: [ˌaltn̩ˈkɪʁçn̩]) is a district in Rhineland-Palatinate, Germany. It is bounded by (from the north and clockwise) the North Rhine-Westphalian districts Rhein-Sieg, Oberbergischer Kreis, Olpe and Siegen-Wittgenstein, and the districts of Westerwaldkreis and Neuwied.

== History ==
The history of the district is linked with the Westerwald region. The district was established in 1816 by the Prussian administration. It combined the county of Wildenburg and the two counties of Sayn. The former had been part of Berg, the latter ones had belonged to the duchy of Nassau. The county used to be divided into nine mayoralties, including the Bürgermeisterei Weyerbusch.

== Geography ==
Altenkirchen is the northernmost district of Rhineland-Palatinate. It is occupied by the northern portions of the Westerwald mountains. The valley of the river Sieg borders the Westerwald on the north. The lands north of the Sieg are called Wildenburgisches Land, after the tiny county of Wildenburg, that once existed here.

== Coat of arms ==
The coat of arms displays:

- Top left: The golden lion of the county of Sayn, which occupied the territory in the 12th century;
- Top right: The symbol of the tiny county of Wildenburg, which existed until 1806 in the very north of the district;
- Bottom: The black and red cross is a combination of the bishops' emblems of Cologne and Trier.

== Towns and municipalities ==
Clickable map of towns and municipalities in the district

Verbandsgemeinden
1. Altenkirchen-Flammersfeld; 1. Almersbach; 2. Altenkirchen^{1, 2}; 3. Bachenberg; 4. Berod bei Hachenburg; 5. Berzhausen; 6. Birnbach; 7. Bürdenbach; 8. Burglahr; 9. Busenhausen; 10. Eichelhardt; 11. Eichen; 12. Ersfeld; 13. Eulenberg; 14. Fiersbach; 15. Flammersfeld; 16. Fluterschen; 17. Forstmehren; 18. Gieleroth; 19. Giershausen; 20. Güllesheim; 21. Hasselbach; 22. Helmenzen; 23. Helmeroth; 24. Hemmelzen; 25. Heupelzen; 26. Hilgenroth; 27. Hirz-Maulsbach; 28. Horhausen; 29. Idelberg; 30. Ingelbach; 31. Isert; 32. Kescheid; 33. Kettenhausen	34. Kircheib; 35. Kraam; 36. Krunkel; 37. Mammelzen; 38. Mehren; 39. Michelbach; 40. Neitersen; 41. Niedersteinebach; 42. Obererbach; 43. Oberirsen; 44. Oberlahr; 45. Obersteinebach; 46. Oberwambach; 47. Ölsen; 48. Orfgen; 49. Peterslahr; 50. Pleckhausen; 51. Racksen; 52. Reiferscheid; 53. Rettersen; 54. Rott; 55. Schöneberg; 56. Schürdt; 57. Seelbach; 58. Seifen; 59. Sörth; 60. Stürzelbach; 61. Volkerzen; 62. Walterschen; 63. Werkhausen; 64. Weyerbusch; 65. Willroth; 66. Wölmersen; 67. Ziegenhain	2. Betzdorf-Gebhardshain; 1. Alsdorf; 2. Betzdorf^{1, 2}; 3. Dickendorf; 4. Elben; 5. Elkenroth; 6. Fensdorf; 7. Gebhardshain; 8. Grünebach; 9. Kausen; 10. Malberg; 11. Molzhain; 12. Nauroth; 13. Rosenheim; 14. Scheuerfeld; 15. Steinebach/Sieg; 16. Steineroth; 17. Wallmenroth; 3. Daaden-Herdorf; 1. Daaden^{1}; 2. Derschen; 3. Emmerzhausen; 4. Friedewald; 5. Herdorf^{2}; 6. Mauden; 7. Niederdreisbach; 8. Nisterberg; 9. Schutzbach; 10. Weitefeld	4. Hamm (Sieg); 1. Birkenbeul; 2. Bitzen; 3. Breitscheidt; 4. Bruchertseifen; 5. Etzbach; 6. Forst; 7. Fürthen; 8. Hamm (Sieg)^{1}; 9. Niederirsen; 10. Pracht; 11. Roth; 12. Seelbach bei Hamm; 5. Kirchen (Sieg); 1. Brachbach; 2. Friesenhagen; 3. Harbach; 4. Kirchen^{1, 2}; 5. Mudersbach; 6. Niederfischbach; 6. Wissen; 1. Birken-Honigsessen; 2. Hövels; 3. Katzwinkel; 4. Mittelhof; 5. Selbach; 6. Wissen^{1, 2}
^{1}seat of the Verbandsgemeinde; ^{2}town

== Economy and infrastructure ==
=== Transport ===
Logo of Verkehrsverbund Rhein-Mosel

Following railway lines are completely or partly located in the Altenkirchen district:

- Engers-Au railway, fright transport on the section Siershahn – Selters – Puderbach – Flammersfeld – Altenkirchen (Holzbachtalbahn), local passenger transport in the Altenkirchen district on the section between Altenkirchen and Pracht (Hohegrete stop) through line RB90.
- Sieg railway, located in Altenkirchen district between the stations Etzbach and Niederschelden, passenger transport (RE9, RB90 and RB93) and fright transport.
- Limburg-Altenkirchen railway, primarily passenger transport (RB90), stations Ingelbach and Altenkirchen (Westerw), located in the Altenkirchen district.
- Heller Valley railway, passenger transport, RB96 runs from Betzdorf (Sieg) to Herdorf in the Altenkirchen district.
- Daade Valley railway, passenger transport, RB97 from Betzdorf (Sieg) station to Daaden.
- Wisser Valley railway from Hermesdorf to Wissen, of service.
- Westerwald railway from Scheuerfeld via Weitefeld to Emmerzhausen, out of service
- Kirchen-Freudenberg railway, in the Altenkirchen district from Kirchen to Niederfischbach, out of service
- Herdorf-Unterwilden railway, from Herdorf via Neunkirchen to Wilnsdorf-Unyerwilden, only Herdorf station is located in Altenkrichen district.
- Linz (Rhein)-Flammersfeld railway from Linz (Rhein) to Flammersfeld station in Seelbach near Altenkrichen (Kasbachtalbahn), located in Altenkirchen district from Peterslahr to Seelbach, touristic special train service between Linz and Kalenborn.

Since January, 1., 2009, Altenkirchen district is member of the transport association Verkehrsverbund Rhein-Mosel (VRM). Additionally, the fare of Rheinland-Tarif, (former Verkehrsverbund Rhein-Sieg, VRS, fare applies for railway rides starting or ending in the Rheinland-Tarif area as well as Westfalen-Tarif on the Siege railway up to Wissen Station if start or end of the ride is in the Westfalen-Tarif area.

Companies in local passenger train service are DB (RE9), Hessische Landesbahn (HLB), section DreiLänderBahn (RB90, RB93, RB95 and RB96) as well as Westerwaldbahn GmbH (RB97).

=== Electricity production ===
The largest number of sustainable electricity in the Altenkirchen district comes from Photovoltaic, the number of sustainable electricity from wind energy, hydropower and biomass is lower, some hydropower plants are located along the river Sieg.
