= Hasselbach, Altenkirchen =

Municipality in Rhineland-Palatinate, Germany

Hasselbach
- Municipality
- Location of Hasselbach within Altenkirchen district
- Interactive map of Hasselbach
- Location within Germany Location within Rhineland-Palatinate
- Coordinates: 50°42′45″N 7°31′41″E
- Country: Germany
- State: Rhineland-Palatinate
- District: Altenkirchen
- Municipal assoc.: Altenkirchen-Flammersfeld

Government
  - Mayor (2019–24): Hans-Jürgen Staats

Area
  - Total: 5.76 km^{2} (2.22 sq mi)
- Elevation: 265 m (869 ft)

Population (2025-12-31)
  - Total: 300
  - Density: 52/km^{2} (130/sq mi)
- Time zone: UTC+01:00 (CET)
  - Summer (DST): UTC+02:00 (CEST)
- Postal codes: 57635
- Dialling codes: 02686
- Vehicle registration: AK
- Website: vg-altenkirchen-flammersfeld.de

Hasselbach (German pronunciation: [ˈhasl̩bax]) is a municipality in the district of Altenkirchen, in Rhineland-Palatinate, in western Germany.
