= Rettersen =

- Municipality
- Coat of arms

- Location of Rettersen within Altenkirchen district
- Interactive map of Rettersen
- Location within Germany Location within Rhineland-Palatinate
- Coordinates: 50°44′16″N 7°41′40″E
- Country: Germany
- State: Rhineland-Palatinate
- District: Altenkirchen
- Municipal assoc.: Altenkirchen-Flammersfeld

Government
  - Mayor (2019–24): Norbert Anhalt

Area
  - Total: 3.21 km^{2} (1.24 sq mi)
- Elevation: 285 m (935 ft)

Population (2025-12-31)
  - Total: 358
  - Density: 112/km^{2} (289/sq mi)
- Time zone: UTC+01:00 (CET)
  - Summer (DST): UTC+02:00 (CEST)
- Postal codes: 57635
- Dialling codes: 02686
- Vehicle registration: AK
- Website: www.rettersen.de

Rettersen is a municipality in the district of Altenkirchen, in Rhineland-Palatinate, in western Germany.
