= Racksen =

- Municipality
- Location of Racksen within Altenkirchen district
- Interactive map of Racksen
- Location within Germany Location within Rhineland-Palatinate
- Coordinates: 50°44′16″N 7°41′40″E
- Country: Germany
- State: Rhineland-Palatinate
- District: Altenkirchen
- Municipal assoc.: Altenkirchen-Flammersfeld

Government
  - Mayor (2019–24): Bernd Hommer

Area
  - Total: 1.97 km^{2} (0.76 sq mi)
- Elevation: 311 m (1,020 ft)

Population (2025-12-31)
  - Total: 139
  - Density: 70.6/km^{2} (183/sq mi)
- Time zone: UTC+01:00 (CET)
  - Summer (DST): UTC+02:00 (CEST)
- Postal codes: 57612
- Dialling codes: 02681
- Vehicle registration: AK
- Website: vg-altenkirchen-flammersfeld.de

Racksen is a municipality in the district of Altenkirchen, in Rhineland-Palatinate, in western Germany. It has 141 inhabitants (Dec. 2020).

== Transport links ==
Racksen is located in the area of the transport association Verkehrsverbund Rhein-Mosel (VRM), fare zone number 912 and served by the local busses of the line 280. Racksen also is located at the Marienwanderweg, a walking path leading from Marienstatt Abbey in Streithausen to Marienthal Abbey (Westerwald).
