= Heupelzen =

- Municipality
- Location of Heupelzen within Altenkirchen district
- Interactive map of Heupelzen
- Location within Germany Location within Rhineland-Palatinate
- Coordinates: 50°43′24″N 7°37′12″E
- Country: Germany
- State: Rhineland-Palatinate
- District: Altenkirchen
- Municipal assoc.: Altenkirchen-Flammersfeld
- Subdivisions: 2

Government
  - Mayor (2019–24): Rainer Düngen

Area
  - Total: 2.58 km^{2} (1.00 sq mi)
- Elevation: 310 m (1,020 ft)

Population (2025-12-31)
  - Total: 248
  - Density: 96.1/km^{2} (249/sq mi)
- Time zone: UTC+01:00 (CET)
  - Summer (DST): UTC+02:00 (CEST)
- Postal codes: 57612
- Dialling codes: 02681
- Vehicle registration: AK
- Website: vg-altenkirchen-flammersfeld.de

Heupelzen is a municipality in the district of Altenkirchen, in Rhineland-Palatinate, in western Germany.
