= Flammersfeld station =

German former railway station

Flammersfeld
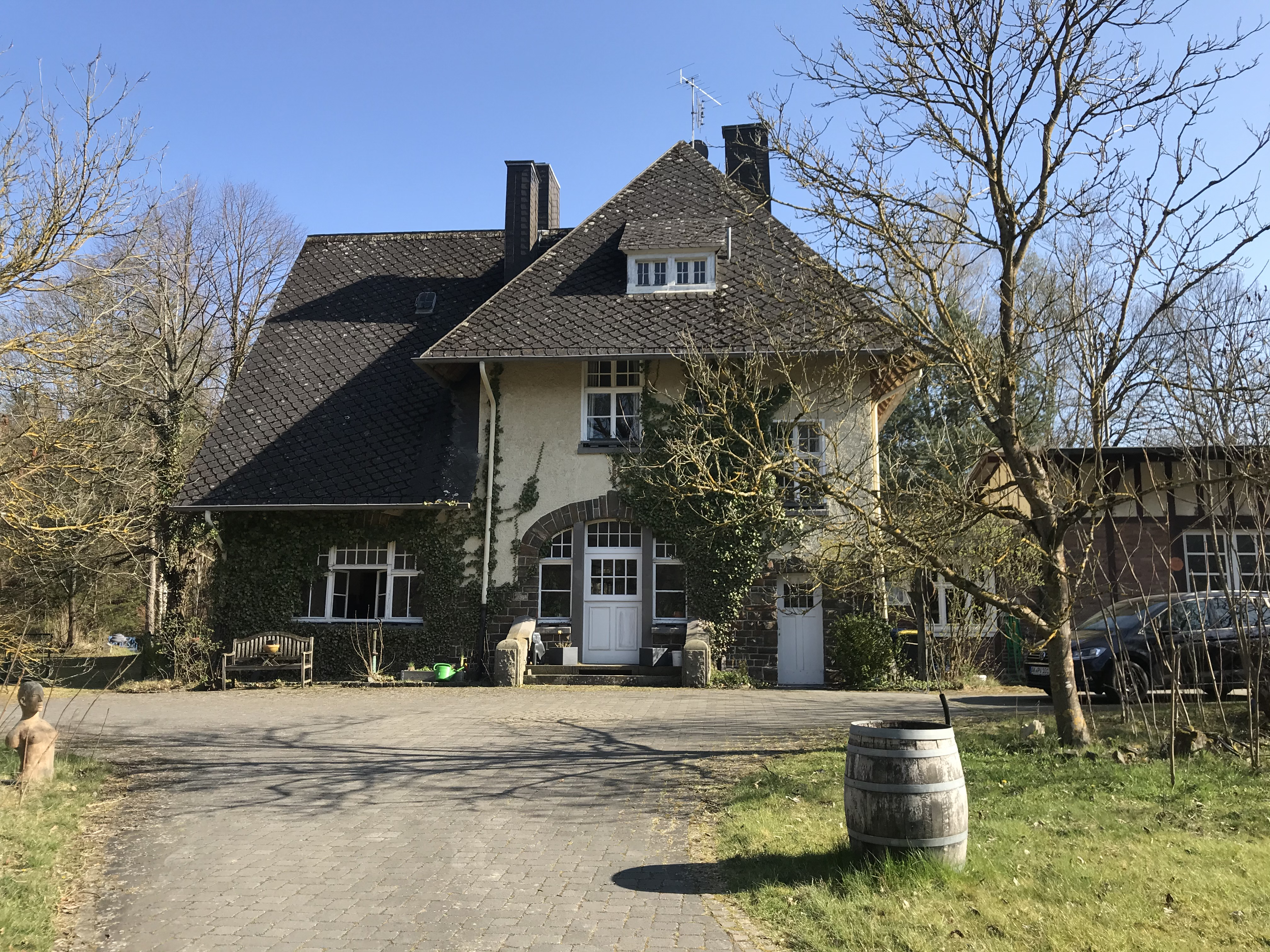
- Flammersfeld station, snapped 2020

General information
- Location: Seelbach, Rhineland-Palatinate; Germany
- Coordinates: 50°38′36″N 7°34′11″E
- Line: Engers–Au railway (km 51.6) Linz (Rhein)–Flammersfeld (km 33.9)

History
- Opened: 1911
- Closed: 1984 (passenger trains Rangers-Au railway, 1990 (freight trains)
Location
- Location within Rhineland-Palatinate

Flammersfeld station is a former railway station on the Engers-Au railway as well as the Linz–Flammersfeld railway, located in Seelbach near Altenkirchen, Rhineland-Palatinate, Germany.

== History ==
The Siershahn–Altenkirchen section of the Engers–Au railway, which is also called Holzbachtalbahn (Holzbach valley railway), opened in 1884, and construction of the Linz–Flammersfeld railway, also known as Kasbachtalbahn (Kasbach valley railway), started in 1905, initially with a junction at Seifen. Following objections, a new junction station was built in Seelbach, named after the neighbouring village of Flammersfeld. The station opened on 2 October 1911 and the line from Linz am Rhein on 1 October 1912.

The station had six tracks and facilities for both passenger and freight traffic. In the spring of 1940, the ministerial special train Heinrich, used by Heinrich Himmler, Joachim von Ribbentrop and Hans Heinrich Lammers, was stationed at Flammersfeld.

The connection to Linz was not restored after the destruction of railway bridges in 1945, and the tracks between Mettelshahn and Flammersfeld were removed in 1957. Passenger services on the Siershahn–Altenkirchen line ended in 1984. The station's freight handling track was removed in December 1990, followed by further track removal in May 1992. A single through track remains in use for freight traffic.

The former station building, dating from around 1910, and its adjoining timber-framed goods shed are listed as protected historic monument by the state of Rhineland-Palatinate.

After the closure of passenger train services on Holzbachtalbahn, the line and Flammersfeld station still were used some times by special trains, for example test rides of the Vectus Verkehrsgesellschaft in 2005 and a cross Westerwald tour of the interest group IG Westerwald-Querbahn e. V. (IWQ), which's goal is to preserve the Herborn–Montabaur railway.
