= Seelbach, Altenkirchen =

Seelbach
- Municipality
- Location of Seelbach within Altenkirchen (Westerwald) district
- Interactive map of Seelbach
- Location within Germany Location within Rhineland-Palatinate
- Coordinates: 50°38′32″N 7°34′4″E
- Country: Germany
- State: Rhineland-Palatinate
- District: Altenkirchen (Westerwald)
- Municipal assoc.: Altenkirchen-Flammersfeld

Government
  - Mayor (2019–24): Wilfried Klein

Area
  - Total: 2.99 km^{2} (1.15 sq mi)
- Elevation: 200 m (660 ft)

Population (2025-12-31)
  - Total: 282
  - Density: 94.3/km^{2} (244/sq mi)
- Time zone: UTC+01:00 (CET)
  - Summer (DST): UTC+02:00 (CEST)
- Postal codes: 57632
- Dialling codes: 02685
- Vehicle registration: AK
- Website: www.seelbach-wied.de

Seelbach (Westerwald) (German pronunciation: [ˈzeːlbax]) is a municipality in the district of Altenkirchen, in Rhineland-Palatinate, Germany.

== Transport ==
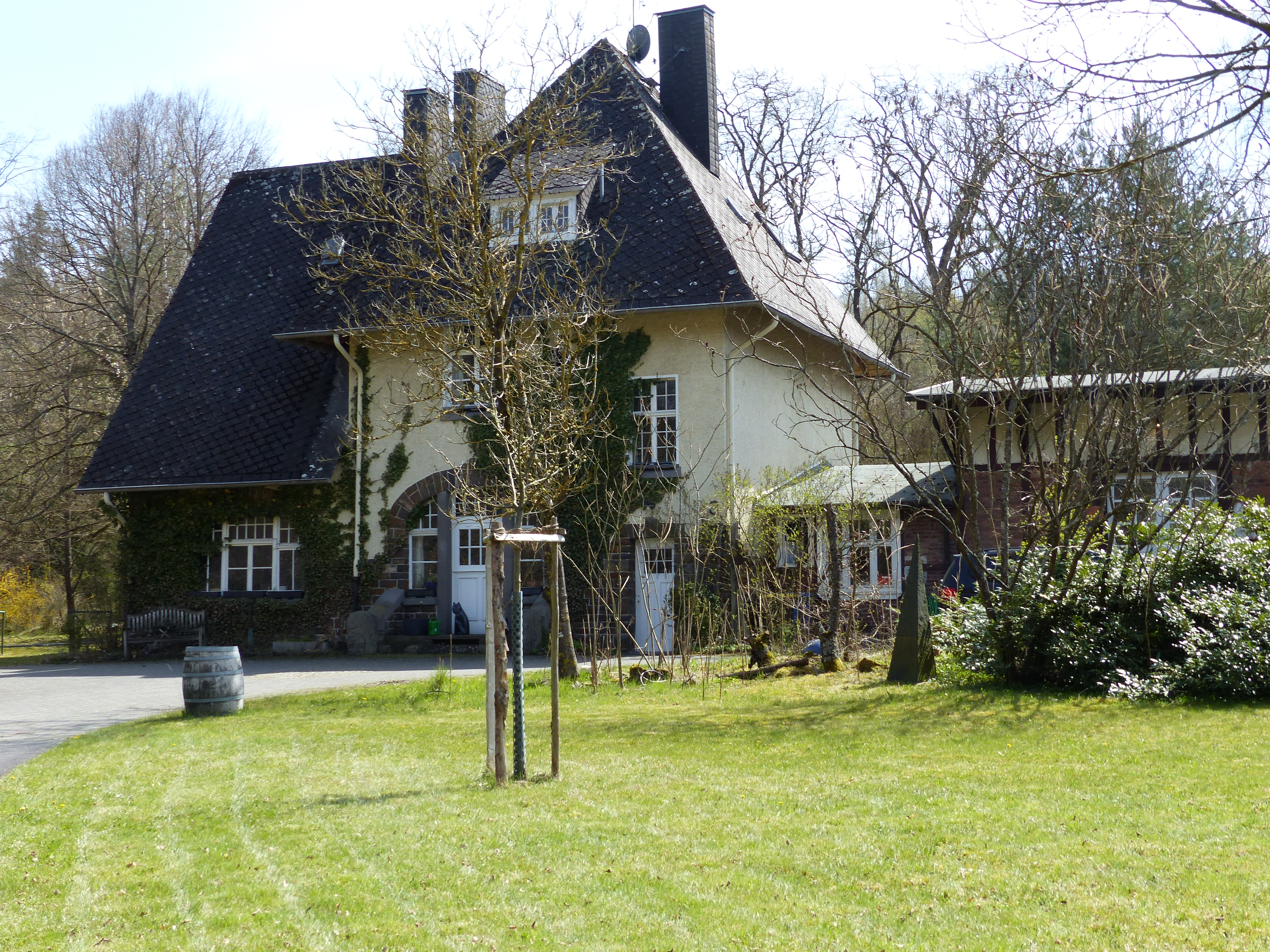
The former Flammersfeld train station located in Seelbach

The former train station Flammersfeld, which currently is out of service for passenger trains, is located in Seelbach on the railway lines Engers-Au railway (Holzbachtalbahn) as well as Linz (Rhine) - Flammersfeld railway (Kasbachtalbahn). Seelbach is located in the zone number 904 of the transport association Verkehrsverbund Rhein-Mosel (VRM) and served by the local bus lines number 122, 126 and 136. Nearest access to the passenger train network is Altenkirchen station.
