= Burglahr =

- Municipality
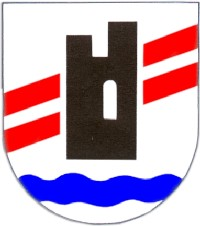
- Coat of arms

- Location of Burglahr within Altenkirchen district
- Interactive map of Burglahr
- Location within Germany Location within Rhineland-Palatinate
- Coordinates: 50°37′6″N 7°29′50″E
- Country: Germany
- State: Rhineland-Palatinate
- District: Altenkirchen
- Municipal assoc.: Altenkirchen-Flammersfeld

Government
  - Mayor (2019–24): Dieter Reifenhäuser

Area
  - Total: 2.89 km^{2} (1.12 sq mi)
- Elevation: 167 m (548 ft)

Population (2025-12-31)
  - Total: 477
  - Density: 165/km^{2} (427/sq mi)
- Time zone: UTC+01:00 (CET)
  - Summer (DST): UTC+02:00 (CEST)
- Postal codes: 57632
- Dialling codes: 02685
- Vehicle registration: AK
- Website: www.burglahr.de

Burglahr (German pronunciation: [ˈbʊʁklaːɐ̯]) is a municipality in the district of Altenkirchen, in Rhineland-Palatinate, Germany.
