= Eulenberg =

- Municipality
- Location of Eulenberg within Altenkirchen district
- Interactive map of Eulenberg
- Location within Germany Location within Rhineland-Palatinate
- Coordinates: 50°36′19″N 07°28′32″E
- Country: Germany
- State: Rhineland-Palatinate
- District: Altenkirchen
- Municipal assoc.: Altenkirchen-Flammersfeld

Government
  - Mayor (2019–24): Helmut Weißenfels

Area
  - Total: 1.16 km^{2} (0.45 sq mi)
- Elevation: 225 m (738 ft)

Population (2025-12-31)
  - Total: 51
  - Density: 44/km^{2} (110/sq mi)
- Time zone: UTC+01:00 (CET)
  - Summer (DST): UTC+02:00 (CEST)
- Postal codes: 57632
- Dialling codes: 02685
- Vehicle registration: AK
- Website: vg-altenkirchen-flammersfeld.de

Eulenberg is a municipality in the district of Altenkirchen, in Rhineland-Palatinate, Germany.
