= Seifen =

- Municipality
- Location of Seifen within Altenkirchen district
- Interactive map of Seifen
- Location within Germany Location within Rhineland-Palatinate
- Coordinates: 50°37′47″N 7°33′40″E
- Country: Germany
- State: Rhineland-Palatinate
- District: Altenkirchen
- Municipal assoc.: Altenkirchen-Flammersfeld

Government
  - Mayor (2019–24): Torsten Walterschen

Area
  - Total: 2.95 km^{2} (1.14 sq mi)
- Elevation: 190 m (620 ft)

Population (2025-12-31)
  - Total: 125
  - Density: 42.4/km^{2} (110/sq mi)
- Time zone: UTC+01:00 (CET)
  - Summer (DST): UTC+02:00 (CEST)
- Postal codes: 57632
- Dialling codes: 02685
- Vehicle registration: AK
- Website: www.seifen-westerwald.de

Seifen is a municipality in the district of Altenkirchen, in Rhineland-Palatinate, in western Germany.

== Transport ==
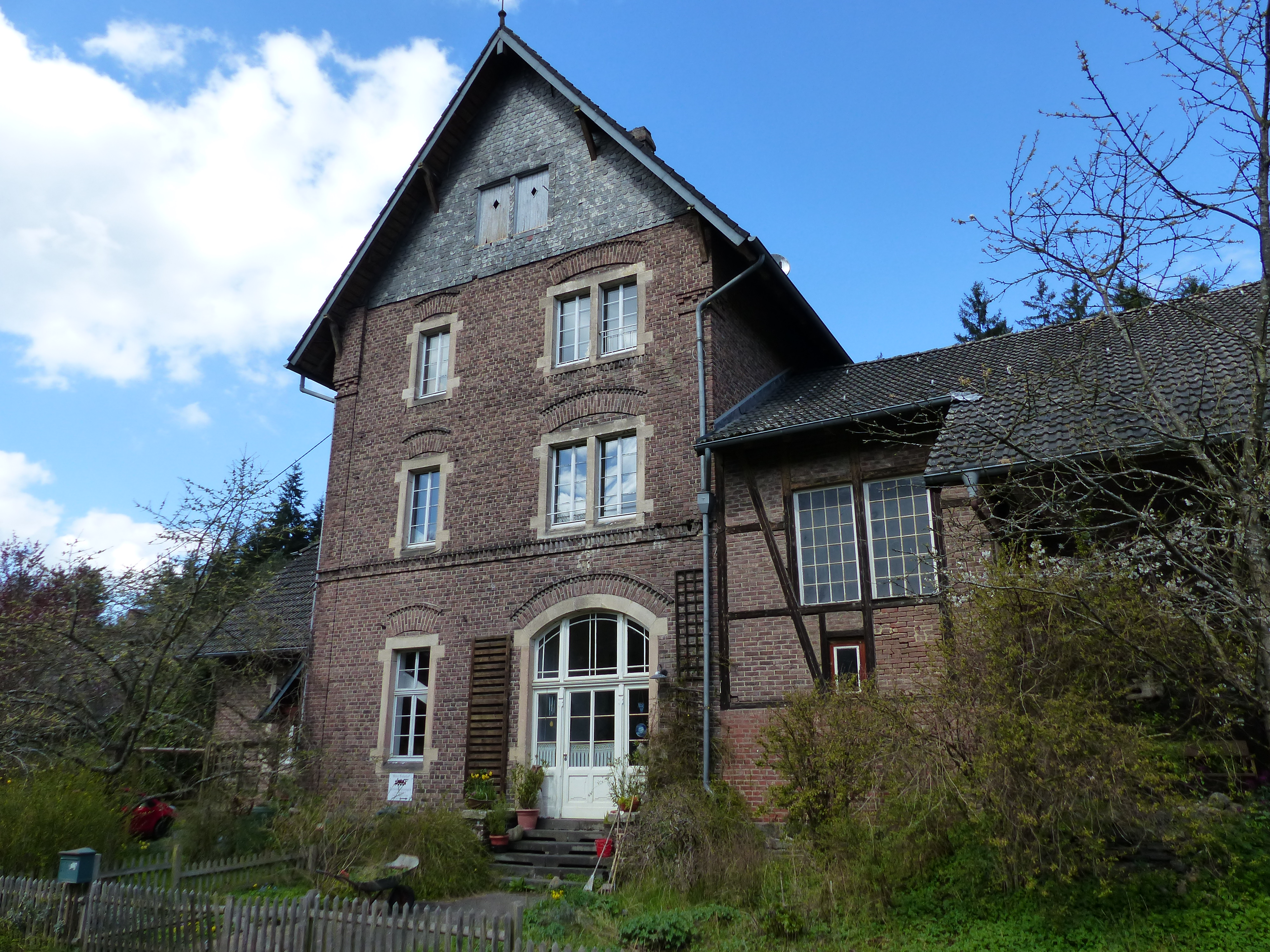
Former train station in Seifen

Seifen is located on the Engers-Au railway line, which on the section from Siershahn to Altenkirchen, where it is called Holzbachtalbahn, currently is not served by passenger trains.
