= Bürgermeisterei Weyerbusch =

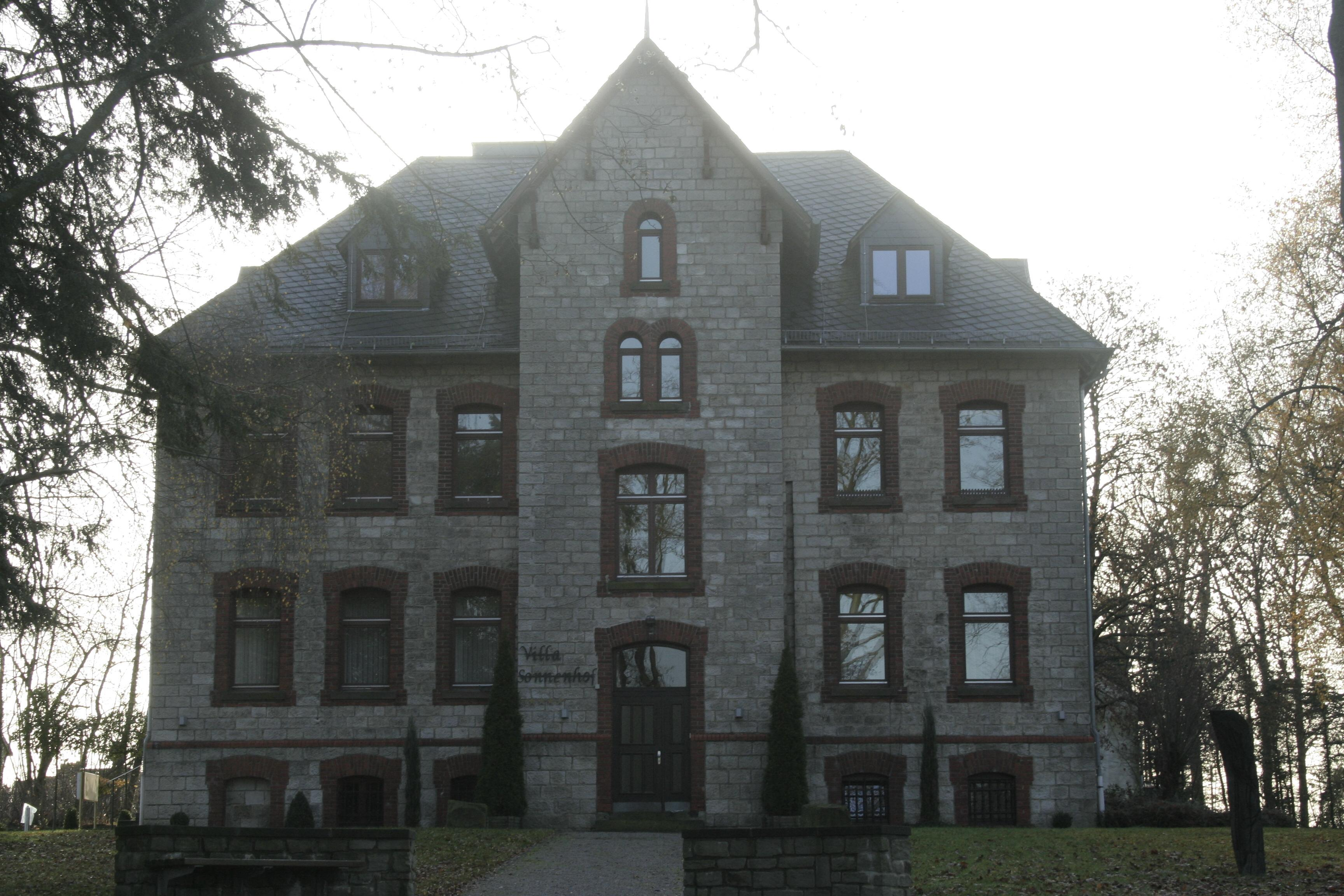
Old town hall of Weyerbusch, now Villa Sonnenhof

The Bürgermeisterei Weyerbusch ("Mayoralty of Weyerbusch") was one of the nine Prussian Bürgermeistereien or mayoralties, into which the county of Altenkirchen, created in 1816 as part of the Regierungsbezirk Coblenz was administratively divided. The mayoralty had 25 municipalities with a population of 2,564 in 1817. From 1845 to 1848, Friedrich Wilhelm Raiffeisen was the mayor. The mayoralty was renamed in 1927 to Amt Weyerbusch.

== Municipalities ==
According to statistics in 1843 and 1861 the following municipalities belonged to the Bürgermeisterei (today's spelling is used; the division is based on the old territorial allocation):

Originally part of the ecclesial parish of Mehren in the County of Sayn-Altenkirchen

- Ersfeld
- Fiersbach including the farms of Dickten and Kriegershof
- Forstmehren
- Giershausen
- Hirzbach with its hamlet of Hähnen
- Kircheib including the hamlets of Reisbitzen, Eckenbach and Grünewald and the farm of Bleckhausen
- Kraam with the hamlet of Heuberg and a mill
- Maulsbach
- Mehren, Kirchdorf with the hamlets of Adorf and Seifen, the farm of Acker and the Hard Mill
- Neuenhof and the farms of Tente, Röttgen and Burg (today villages in Kircheib)
- Rettersen with its hamlets of Hahn and Witthecke, the farm of Roßberg and the Willachshaus
- Ziegenhain

Originally part of the ecclesial parish of Birnbach in the County of Sayn-Hachenburg

- Birnbach, Kirchdorf
- Hasselbach with a mill
- Hemmelzen with a mill
- Hilkhausen with the hamlets of Irlen and Wiesplacken (today villages in Weyerbusch)
- Marenbach (today a village in Oberirsen)
- Neitersen with the hamlet of Fladersbach
- Niederölfen (today a village in Neitersen)
- Oberirsen
- Oberölfen (today a village in Helmenzen)
- Rimbach mit einer Mühle (today a village in Oberirsen)
- Weyerbusch
- Wölmersen
- Werkhausen with the hamlet of Leingen and the farms of Ochsenbruch and Acker

== Bürgermeisters ==
The Bürgermeisters, from 1927, Amtsbürgermeisters, of Weyerbusch were:

1817–1845	Cristian Hörter
1845–1848	Friedrich Wilhelm Raiffeisen
1848–1863	Bieler
1863–1866	Stöhr
1867–1884	Elven
1884–1933	August Schneider
1933–1945	Carl Weyer
1945–1946	Hohl, Greis, Rörig (kommissarisch)
1946–1965	Werner Kuhnt
1965–1968	Alwin Hundhausen
