= Battle of Kircheib =

Battle of the War of the First Coalition

- Part of War of the First Coalition
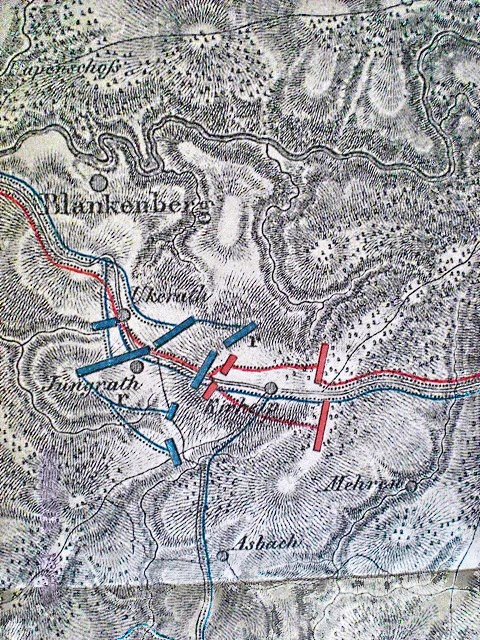
- Section of a 1796 map from the book Grundsätze der Strategie by Archduke Charles of Austria
Date	19 June 1796
Location	Various villages in Westerwald, Rhineland-Palatinate, modern-day Germany
Result	Austrian victory

Belligerents
France	Austria

Commanders and leaders
Jean-Baptiste Kléber	Paul Kray of Krajowa; Merveldt

Strength
24,000	14,000

Casualties and losses
1,500	400

The Battle of Kircheib (German: Schlacht bei Kircheib) was a military engagement during the War of the First Coalition. On 19 June 1796, French and Austrian troops clashed at Kircheib in the Westerwald uplands in present-day Germany. The village the Austrians occupied was well defended and had cannons on the hills behind for additional protection. Sometimes it is called the Battle of Uckerath (Schlacht bei Uckerath) after another nearby village, Uckerath, which belongs today to Hennef.

== Background ==
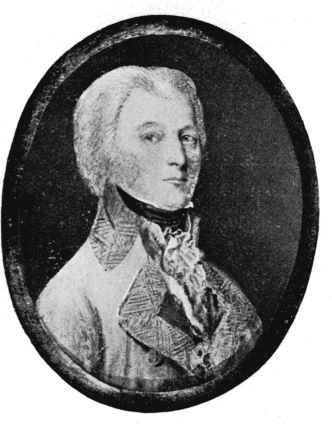
Paul Kray of Krajowa

In 1796, French troops under General Jean-Baptiste Kléber launched a major campaign in the Westerwald on the orders of the commander-in-chief Jean-Baptiste Jourdan. A camp was set up on the hill spur of Jungeroth, today part of Buchholz. This site was particularly suitable for several reasons. First, it was protected by steep slopes on three sides as well as the Hanfbach and Scheußbach streams. Furthermore, the Steiner Berg, Priesterberg and Heppenberg hills as well as the High Road from Cologne to Frankfurt were nearby. The camp was extensively fortified with protective banks and ditches. On 4 June 1796, the French army struck camp and set off for battle. At the Battle of Altenkirchen, the Austrians, under the command of Prince Ferdinand Frederick Augustus of Württemberg, were pushed back behind the River Lahn. On 15 June, however, the French were defeated at Wetzlar by the Austrians under the command of Archduke Charles of Austria and retreated back to camp. They planned a further withdrawal to Düsseldorf over the succeeding days.

== Course of the battle ==
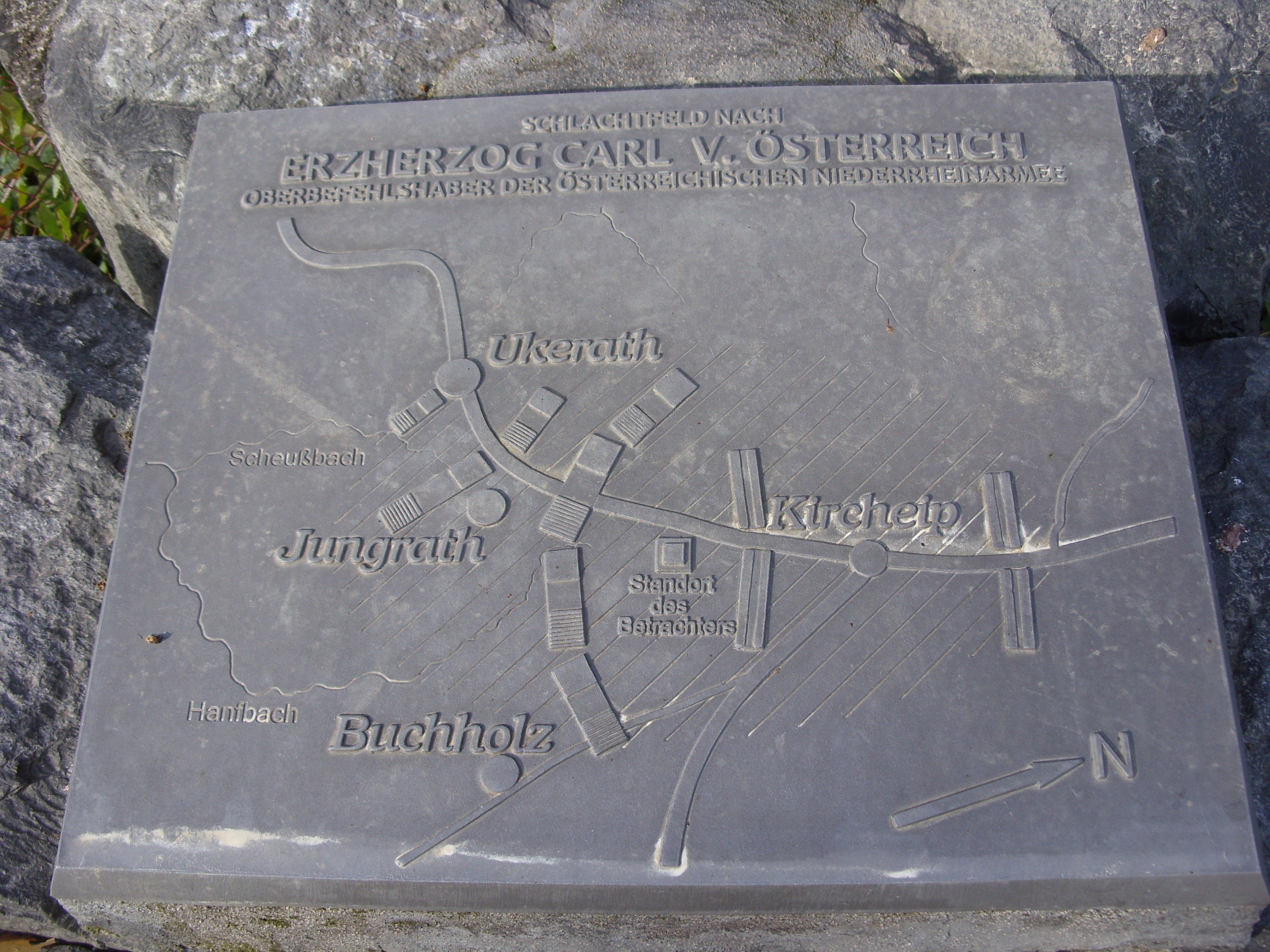
Map of the Battle of Kircheib

On 19 June 1796 at two o'clock in the morning, the Austrians, under Field Marshal Lieutenant Paul Kray, attacked the French camp at Jungeroth (near Buchholz/Uckerath) with cavalry and infantry, but were beaten back and pursued by the French as far as Kircheib. The village was well defended. The French were initially fired upon by artillery and then stormed the village, whereupon they again came under fire from the Austrian artillery which was drawn up on the hills behind the village. After a long infantry battle for these heights, the French were beaten back and retreated. The French lost 1,500 dead and the Austrians 400.

The Austrians had four battalions in the fight, their whole vanguard, reinforced by line troops bringing the total up to 14,000 men. The French had over 24,000 soldiers. The French reconnaissance troops made serious mistakes: first, they estimated that there were 44,000 enemy, and, second, they clearly knew nothing of the Austrian artillery stationed on the hills behind Kircheib.

Less excusable is that Kray, when he advanced on Uckerath on the 19th, was not sufficiently reinforced to ensure a decisive superiority over Kléber. The fatigue of his troops, the lack of food, uncertainty over whether the enemy had already crossed over to Neuwied and a desire not to become overextended, are spurious reasons that deserve no consideration, because it was only a march to ensure Kléber's complete withdrawal from the Sieg (assessment by Archduke Carl of Austria).

== Aftermath ==
After the battle the French began a general withdrawal. Kléber's crossed the Sieg on 20 June near Siegburg and entered Düsseldorf on the 21st.

== Sources and research ==
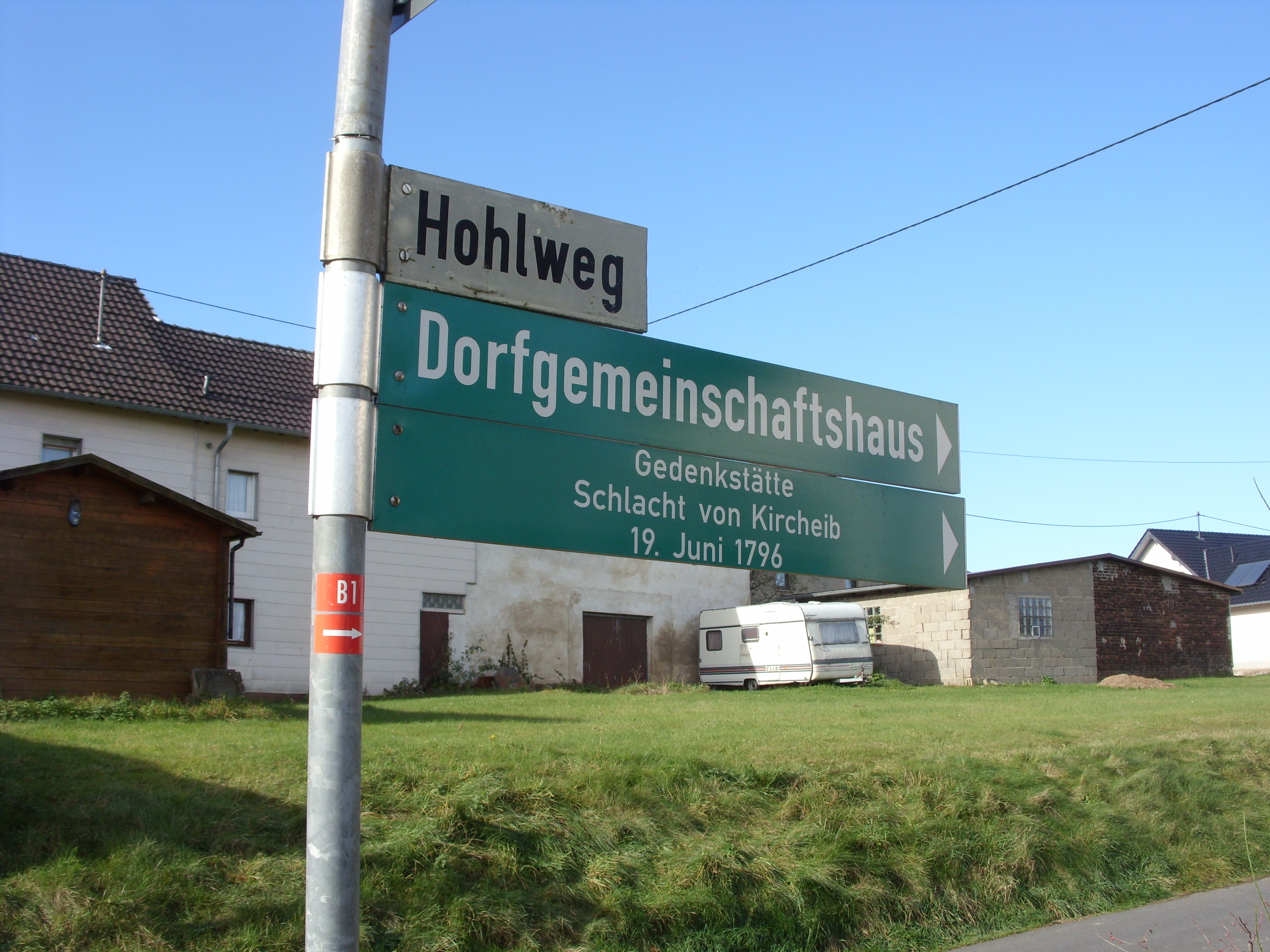
Signpost to the Battle of Kircheib

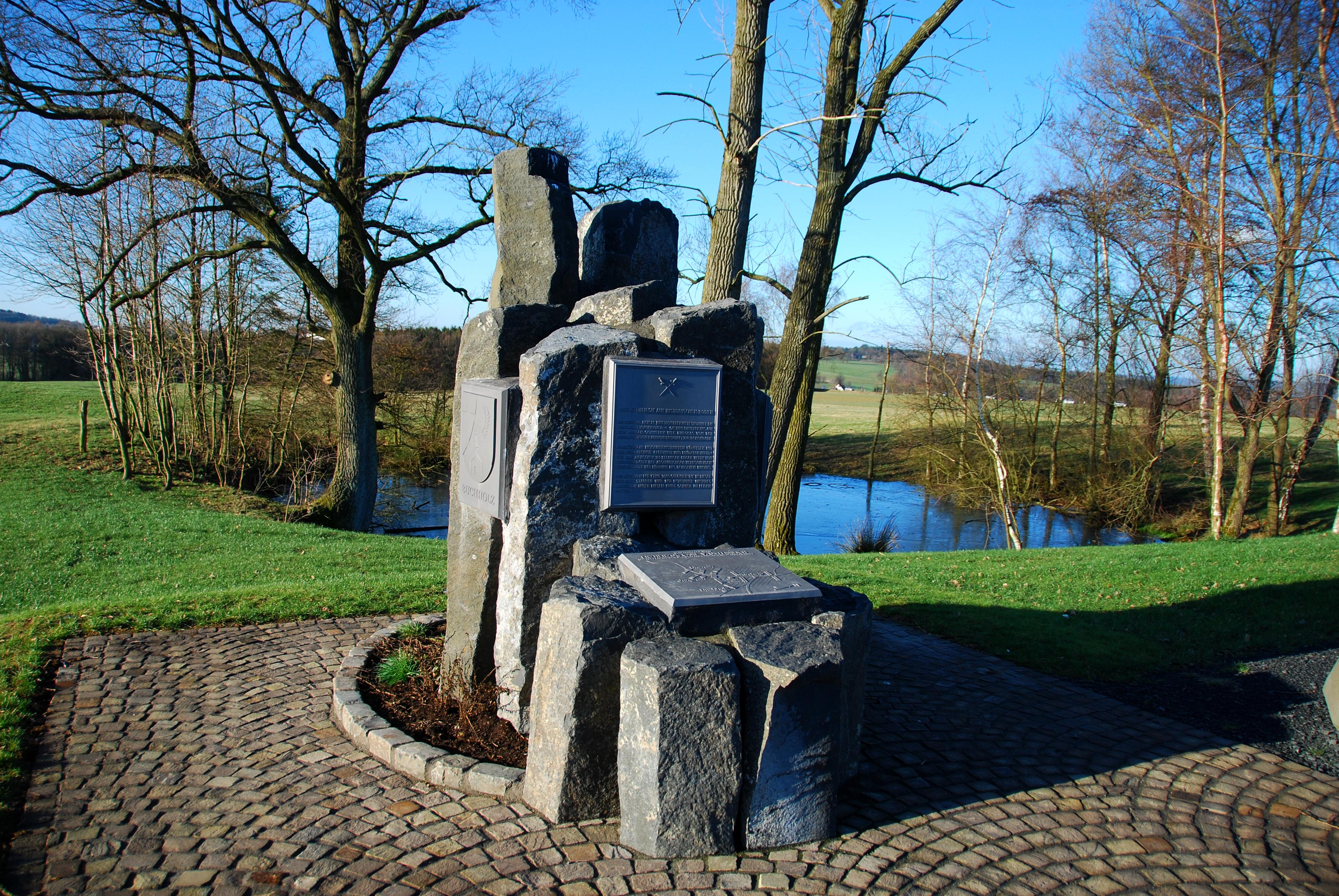
Monument to the Battle of Kircheib

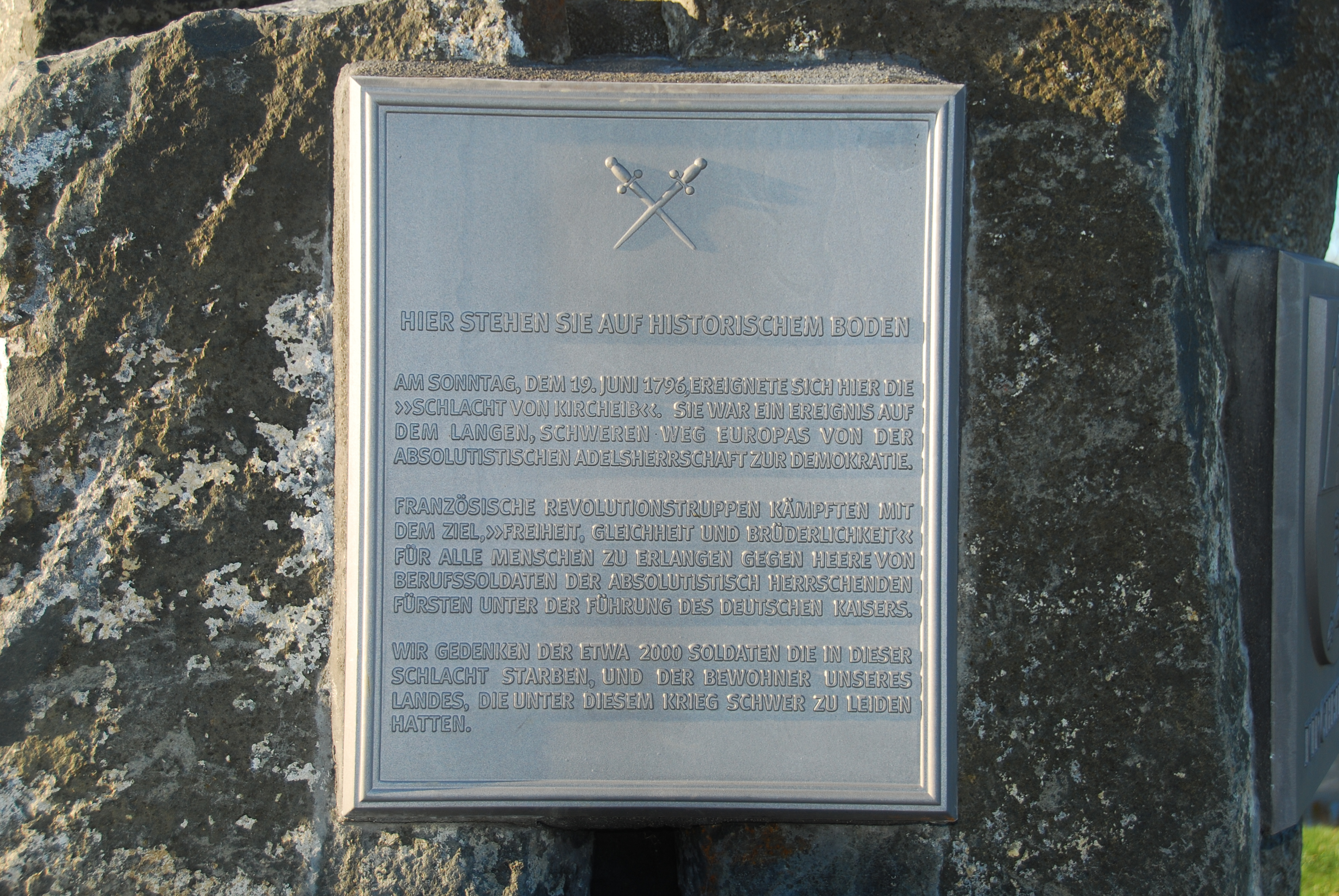
Details of the Battle of Kircheib

There are various contemporary reports about the battle. Among others, reports and evaluations may be found in the records of Archduke Charles of Austria, Austrian field marshal lieutenant, Paul Freiherr Kray von Krajowa and Hermann Christian Hülder of Oberdollendorf, who visited the battlefield on 20 June. In addition, numerous artefacts of the battle can still be found in the area and the fortifications in Jungeroth are visible in aerial photographs. The circumstances of the battle were last investigated by local researchers, Horst Weiß and Theo Faßbender from Buchholz. Subsequently, on the initiative of council member Ludwig Eich, the Buchholz municipal council erected a memorial for peace. Its inauguration took place on 19 June 2009, the 213th anniversary of the battle. The memorial stone is located in the village of Griesenbach, in the municipality of Buchholz, near the community centre on Hohlweg on 50.70516944°N 7.42855277°E by the pond of Sophienweiher at a height of 279 metres above sea level. It stands on a ridge in the centre between the opposing lines of troops at the start of the battle. In Griesenbach, at the corner of Buchholzer Straße and Hohlweg, the sign "Dorfgemeinschaftshaus / Gedenkstätte Schlacht von Kircheib" points the way; from there 700 m straight ahead.

A map board shows the positions at the opening of the battle. On the left are the French and on the right the Austrian troops. In the centre is the site of the monument.

== Literature ==
- Daniel Schneider: Die Schlacht von Altenkirchen 1796 in ihrem historischen Kontext. In: Heimat-Jahrbuch des Kreises Altenkirchen, 2012, pp. 183–194.
- Vor 210 Jahren: Die Schlacht von Kircheib. In: General-Anzeiger (Bonn) dated 30 August 2006
- Archduke Charles of Austria: Grundsätze der Strategie, erläutert durch die Darstellung des Feldzuges von 1796 in Deutschland. Theil II Geschichte des Feldzugs. Anton Strauss, Vienna, 1819, S. 94–101.
- Jean-Baptiste Jourdan, translated by Johann Bachoven von Echt: Denkwürdigkeiten der Geschichte des Feldzugs von 1796. Coblenz, 1823, p. 29.
- Leopold Bleibtreu: Denkwürdigkeiten aus den Kriegsbegebenheiten bei Neuwied von 1792 bis 1797. Carl Georgi, Bonn, 1834, pp. 86–88 (Gefecht bei Uckerath)
