= Lichtenstein Castle (Greifenstein) =

Burg Lichtenstein
- Greifenstein-Holzhausen
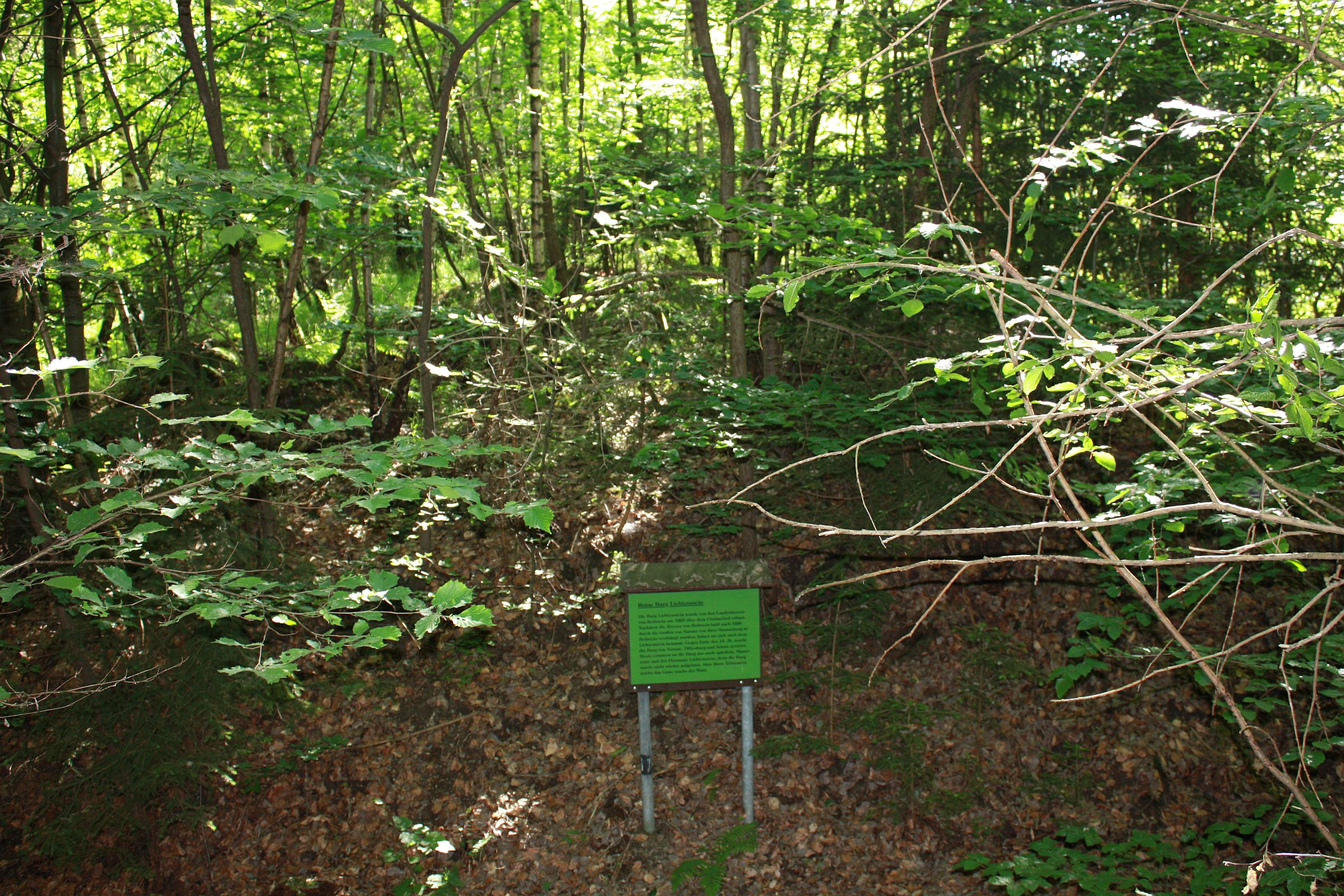
- The burgstall of the Lichtenstein

Site information
- Type: hill castle, spur castle
- Code: DE-HE
- Condition: burgstall (no above-ground ruins)

Location
- Coordinates: 50°36′34″N 8°16′28″E
- Height: 315 m above sea level (NHN)

Site history
- Built: c. 1225 (or 1255)

Garrison information
- Occupants: Local nobility

Lichtenstein Castle (German: Burg Lichtenstein) is a levelled spur castle on the hill of Burgberg Lichtenstein, 315 m above sea level (NN), near the Greifenstein village of Holzhausen on the old military High Road, that ran from Frankfurt via Wetzlar to Cologne. The castle site is situated to the north of, and above, the Ulmbach Reservoir in the Hessian county of Lahn-Dill-Kreis.

== History ==
The little castle on a hill spur was likely built around 1225 by the Lords of Lichtenstein, close relatives of the Lords of Greifenstein. This is not, however, clear from the records, because it is unclear, whether Conrad of Lichtenstein, who is named in deeds in 1225 and 1229, also belonged to the family of the Lichtensteins in Greifenstein. Many secondary sources deduce that the castle was first built around 1250 by the brothers, Werner and Kraft of Lichtenstein. Like Greifenstein, Lichtenstein was captured and destroyed in 1298 by Counts John of Nassau (died 1328) and Henry of Solms-Burgsolms (died c. 1313) along with troops of the Wetterau imperial cities, because the Greifensteins and Lichtensteins had aligned themselves with the counter-king, Albert of Habsburg and against King Adolphus of Nassau, and because they, at least in the eyes of the Nassaus and Solmses, had acted like robber barons.

Unlike Greifenstein Castle, Lichtenstein was never rebuilt and the Lichtensteins probably lived on a farmstead in nearby Wallendorf (today part of Beilstein). The ruins of their castle continued to remain in their possession, but then finally went to Kraft of Rodenhausen in 1360 through his marriage to Irmgard, the heiress of Wittekind of Lichtenstein, Wittekind being the last male in the family line. Kraft sold the castle hill together with its ruins and the rest of the estate to Count John of Nassau-Hadamar (died 1365).

In 1395 the Burgberg and ruins of Lichtenstein came into the possession of the Count of Solms. John II of Solms-Burgsolms, known as "Springsleben" (died 1405) who, since the destruction of his own castle in Burgsolms in 1384 by the Wetterau federation of the imperial cities of Wetzlar, Friedberg and Gelnhausen resided at the rebuilt Greifenstein Castle, and his son, John III (died 1415), the last of the line of Solms-Burgsolms, acquired it in March 1395 from Count Philip I of Nassau-Saarbrücken-Weilburg together with other estates, which Philip had bought in 1363 from Kraft of Rodenhausen and his wife, Irmgard of Lichtenstein.

== Today ==
Of the old castle only the remains of the neck ditch below the hill plateau and a few wall remnants may be seen.

== Tourism ==
From the exit to the village of Greifenstein, the Three Castles Route (Drei-Burgen-Wanderung) runs through Greifenstein Land for 11 km past the ruins of Lichtenstein Castle to Beilstein and back. The path is waymarked with a black shield and a white, stylised silhouette of Greifenstein Castle. On the way out it runs along the High Road and Trompeters Loch, above the Ulm Reservoir to Beilstein. The return leg runs past the Straubersberg (425 m) and back to Greifenstein.

== Literature ==
- Rudolph zu Solms-Laubach (1865), digitalised%5d Geschichte des Grafen- und Fürstenhauses Solms (in German), Frankfurt am Main: C. Adelmann
- Rudolf Knappe: Mittelalterliche Burgen in Hessen: 800 Burgen, Burgruinen und Burgstätten. 3. Auflage. Wartberg-Verlag. Gudensberg-Gleichen, 2000, ISBN 3-86134-228-6, p. 292.
