= Wiesenbach =

Wiesenbach may refer to several places:

== In Austria ==
- Wiesenbach (Lower Austria)

== In Germany ==
- Wiesenbach (Ahlbach), tributary of the Ahlbach (to the Mehrbach) near Orfgen, Altenkirchen (Westerwald), Rhineland-Palatinate
- Wiesenbach (Rhein-Neckar), a municipality in Baden-Württemberg
- Wiesenbach, Bavaria, a municipality in the district of Günzburg in Bavaria
