= Double chapel =

Church or chapel with two storeys, giving two different worship spaces

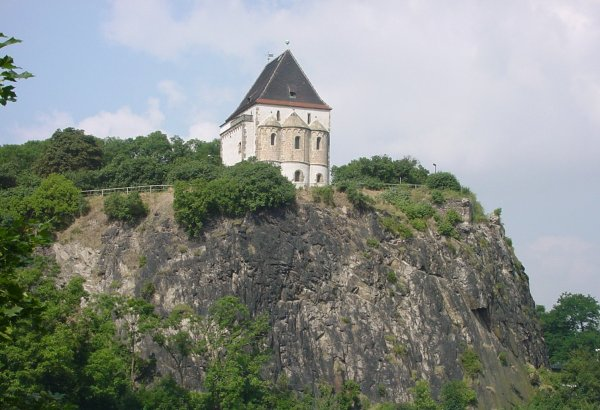
Double Chapel of Landsberg

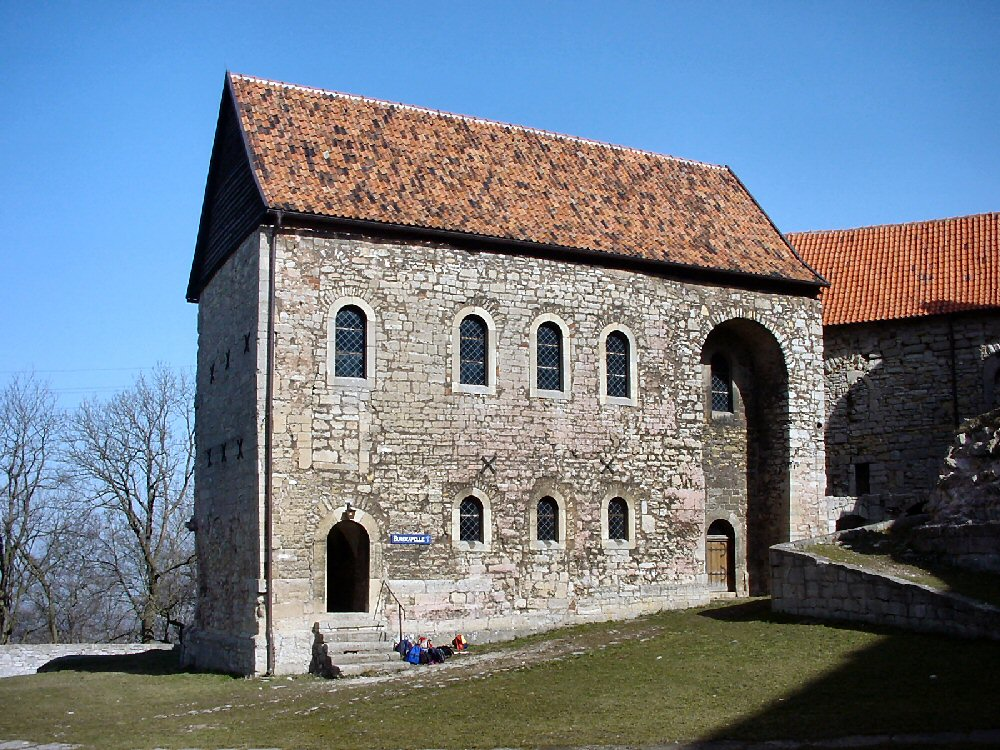
Double Chapel of Lohra Castle

The double chapel, sometimes double church, is a chapel or church building with two storeys that either have a central aperture enabling their simultaneous use for services or are completely separate, just connected by a staircase, and used for different liturgical functions. In the latter type, there is often a crypt on the lower level and a celebratory space on the upper floor.

== Architecture ==
This special form of church building that was used in medieval European architecture up to the 13th century had two churches built on two levels, one above the other, usually with the same floor plan, but there are exceptions such as the Imperial Chapel of St. Ulrich in Goslar. The earlier arrangement of the two chapel floors, which was purported to enable a "separation between the lower and upper classes of the Middle Ages", in which the lower chapel was assigned to the "common people" and the upper chapel to the "feudal lords" and their families is not substantiated by any evidence. Instead, it is more likely that the distinction was either between a public lower chapel, where the ruler celebrated mass with guests before official events or during state visits, and a private upper chapel, where the lord's family worshipped; or between an upper chapel which was reserved for estate services and a lower chapel used as a crypt and also for requiem masses. In these Romanesque chapels the upper and lower levels were usually connected by a secondary aperture in the floor of the upper chapel. The double chapel had numerous architectural successors, notably the charnel house, a combination of cemetery chapel and ossuary, but also in numerous two-storey cemetery chapels in southern Germany, Austria and Bohemia. Where they function purely as cemetery chapels, double chapels are usually dedicated to Saint Michael. The lower chapel was given the character of an ossuary, as a Late Gothic relic chapel and memorial for the fallen after the failure of the feudal crusades (e.g. Kiedrich or Görlitz).

== Examples ==
Germany:

Double chapels were mainly built in Hohenstaufen imperial palaces and castles, but also in monasteries. The best known are:

- St. Michael's in Fulda the earliest known example in Germany
- Palace chapel of St. Gotthard at Mainz Cathedral, a court chapel in its most ostentatious
- Chapel of St. Crucis above the town of Landsberg, the only surviving building in the old Landsberg Castle
- Goslar's Imperial Chapel of St. Ulrich
- Chapel of the Kaiserburg at Nuremberg Castle
- Chapel at Neuenburg Castle above Freyburg, a four-post room based on a Byzantine prototype
- Double Chapel at Rheda Castle (Westphalia), a simple unsupported room
- Chapel at Trifels Castle in a Romanesque bergfried
- Chapel at Lohra Castle
- Double Chapel of St. Emmeram and St. Catharine in Speyer Cathedral
- Double Chapel of St. Nicholas in Nienburg on the Saale
- Chapel in the Dominican church in Eisenach
- Chapel in St. Ludger's Abbey in Helmstedt
- St. Nicholas' Chapel in the imperial palace in Kaiserslautern
- Chapel of St. Erasmus (St. Erasmus and St. Michael) in Kempten
- Double Chapel of St. Trinitatis and Johannes Nepomuk at Breitenstein Castle
- Double Chapel of the Holy Rood (after 1465) at the Heiliges Grab in Görlitz with the Chapel of St. Adam on the lower level and the Golgatha Chapel on the upper floor
- Michaelskapelle (1444) mit Karner in Kiedrich (Rheingau)
- Double Church of St. Clemens in Schwarzrheindorf
- Former double church of St. Symeon at the Porta Nigra in Trier with the grave of Saint Symeon in the lower chapel
- St. Catharine's Chapel at Greifenstein Castle in Hesse with a Gothic lower floor, was created during work to convert the church to the Baroque style

Rest of Europe

- Bishop's Chapel of Hereford Cathedral in Hereford, England (1079–95): the oldest surviving example of two chapels linked by an aperture in the floor
- Double Chapel at Eger Castle in Cheb, Bohemia, Czechia
- Double Chapel of St. Ulrich and St. Nicholas in the Benedictine abbey of St. John in Graubünden, Switzerland
- Double Chapel at Vianden Castle in Vianden, Luxembourg
- The Sainte-Chapelle in Paris, France: originally part of the royal palace, where the king's private chapel housed a collection of relics (removed during the French Revolution) and the lower chapel served as the parish church for the residents of the palace.

Armenia

- Original St. Rhipsime's Church in Vagharshapat, late 4th century
- First basilica for Mesrop Mashtots in Oshakan, mid-5th century
- Mother of God's Church (Surb Astvatsatsin) in Yeghvard, early 14th century
- Mother of God's Church (Surb Astvatsatsin) in Noravank Abbey dating to 1331–1339
- Basilica of Kaputan (near Abovyan), dated to 1349

== See also ==
- Double church

== Literature ==
- Gerhard Strauss; Harald Olbrich (ed.): Lexikon der Kunst. Architektur, bildende Kunst, angewandte Kunst, Industrieformgestaltung, Kunsttheorie. E. A. Seemann, Leipzig, 1989, ISBN 3-363-00286-6, Vol. 2 (Cin–Gree), pp. 193 f.
- Mathias Haenchen: Die mittelalterliche Baugeschichte der Goslarer Pfalzkapelle St. Ulrich. Diss. TU Braunschweig 1998, Brunswick, 1998
- Oscar Schürer: Romanische Doppelkapellen. Eine typengeschichtliche Untersuchung. In: Marburger Jahrbuch für Kunstwissenschaft 5, 1929, pp. 99–192
