= Wied Scala =

Coordinates: 50°40′07″N 7°35′02″E

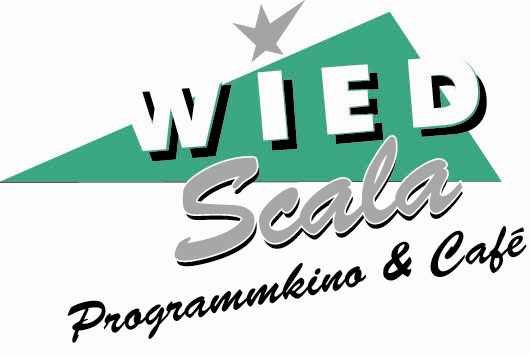
The Wied Scala

The Wied-Scala is an art-house cinema in Neitersen in the Westerwald region of Germany. It was first opened as a normal cinema in 1956. It takes its name from the river Wied, which flows immediately by the cinema building. The foyer of the cinema has a small café, which is supplemented in summer by a beer garden. The arena and balcony offer 110 seats. For events without seating, it can accommodate about 220 people. Since its reopening in 1988, the Wied Scala has established itself as a venue for culture and events covering for a wide variety of themes and, since 1989, it has been regularly received awards for an outstanding film programme at state and federal level. In recent years comprehensive modernisation measures have been carried out to upgrade the video and sound technology, as well as seating and fire protection, in order to cope with the rising demands on infrastructure and safety. In spite of these measures the cinema very largely retains its 1950's décor and original character.

== Gallery ==
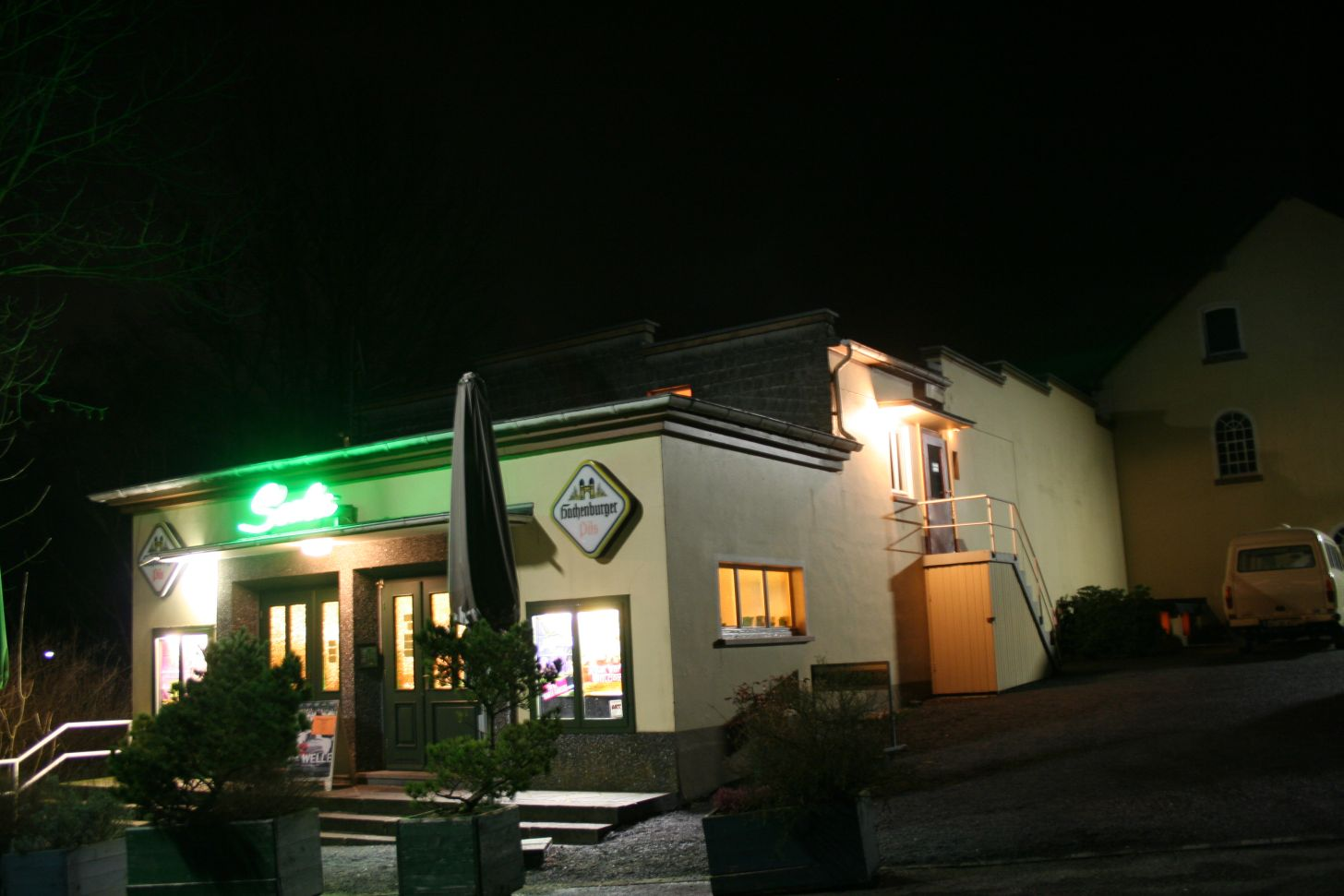
External view

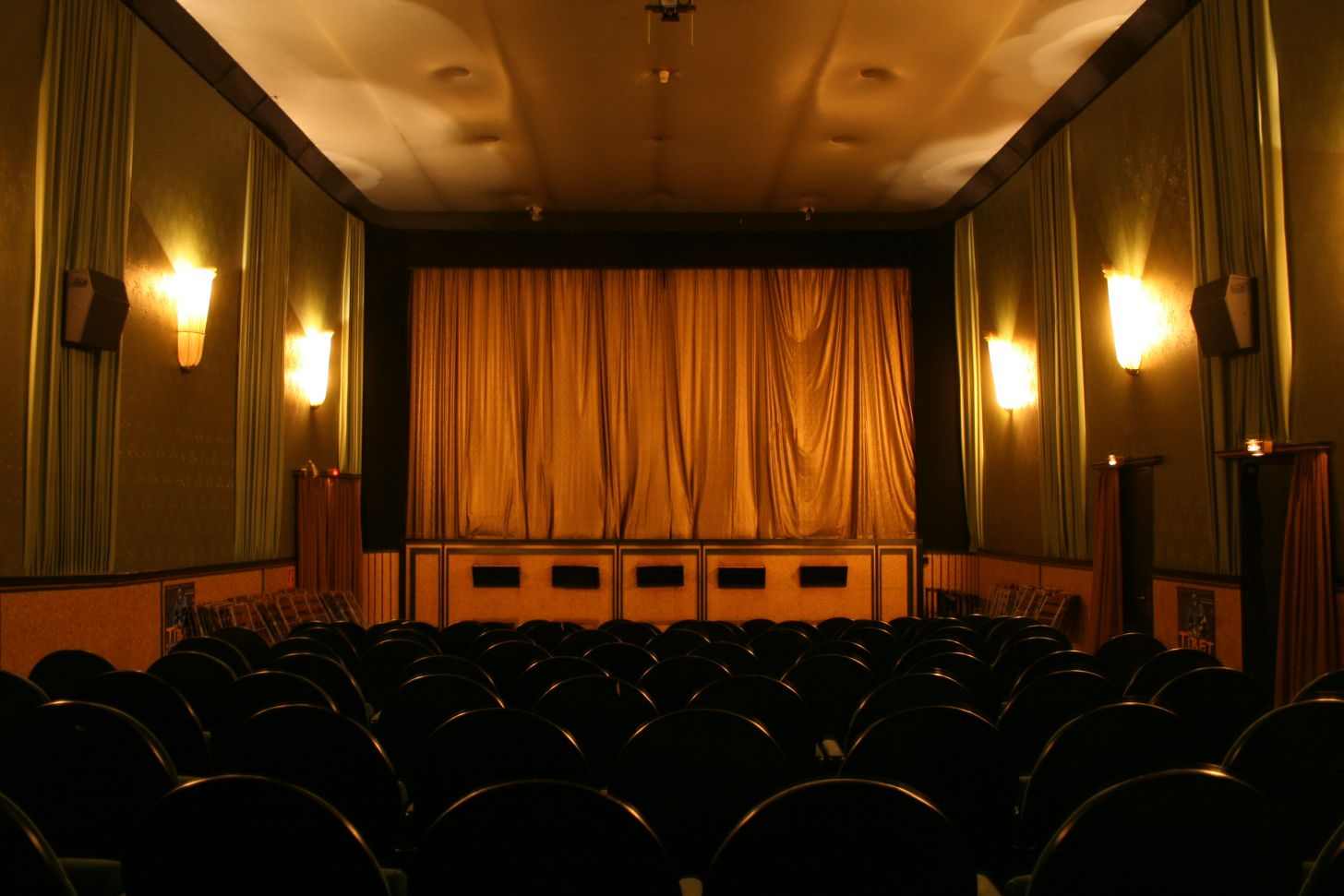
Main arena

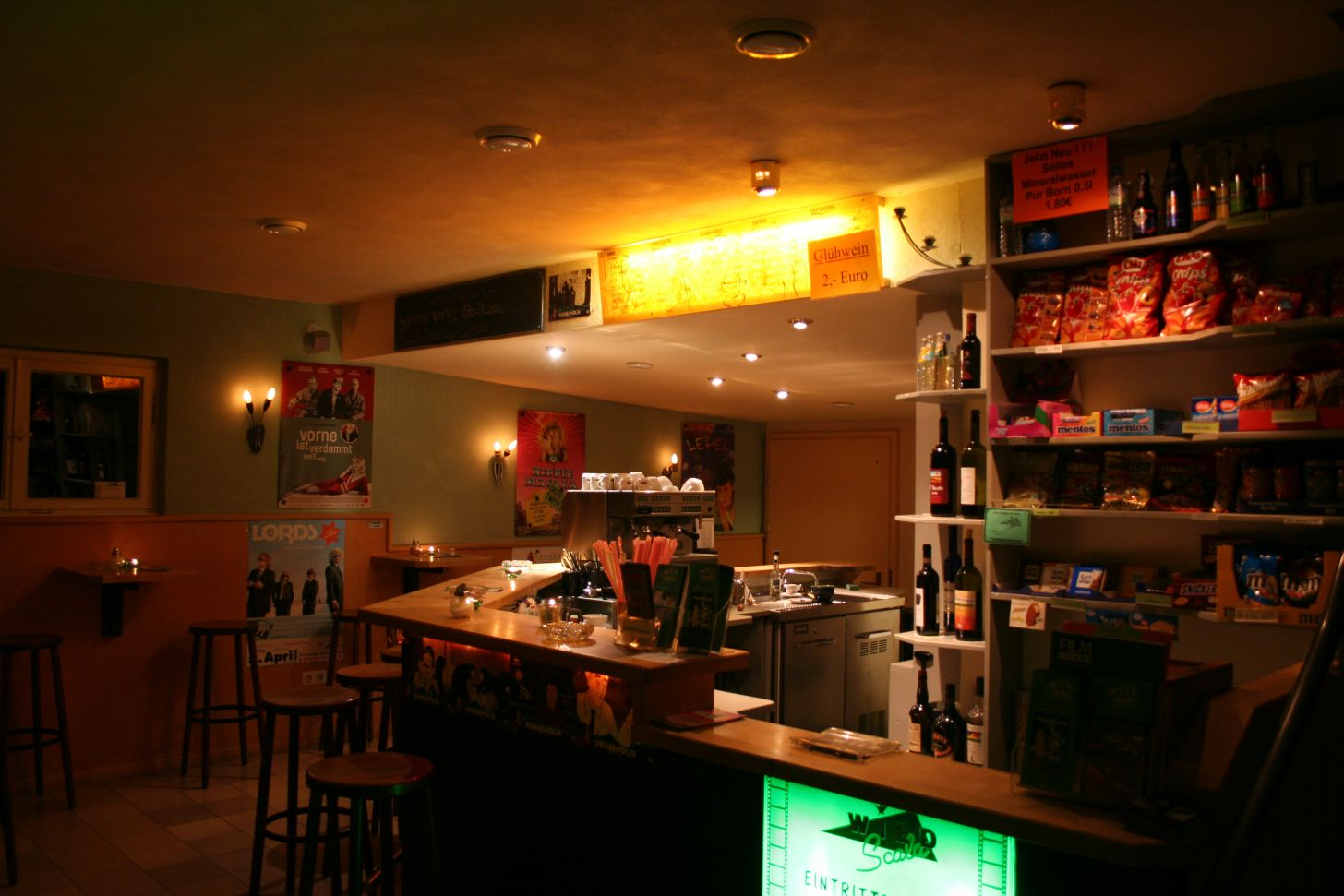
Foyer

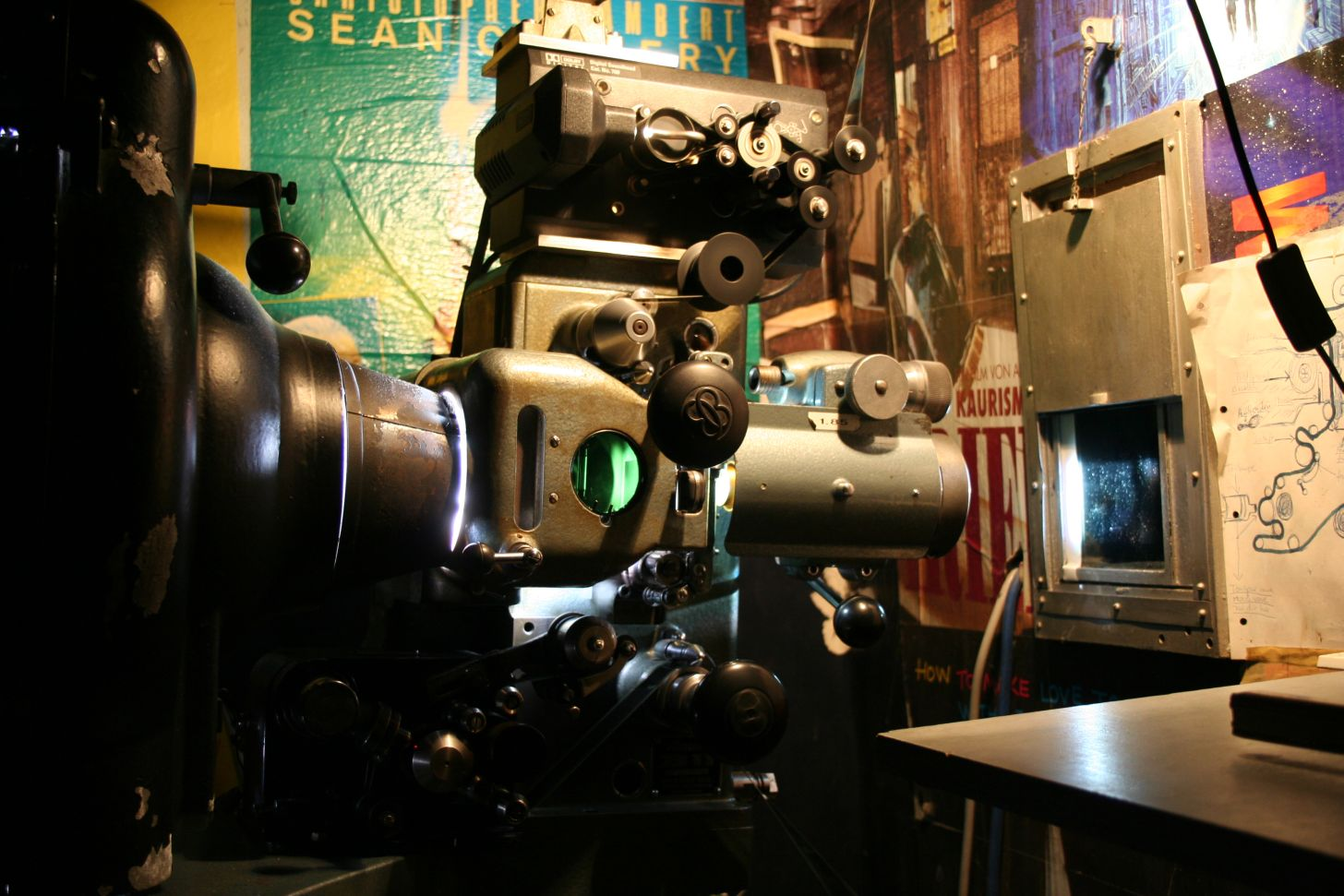
Project
