= Berod bei Hachenburg =

- Municipality
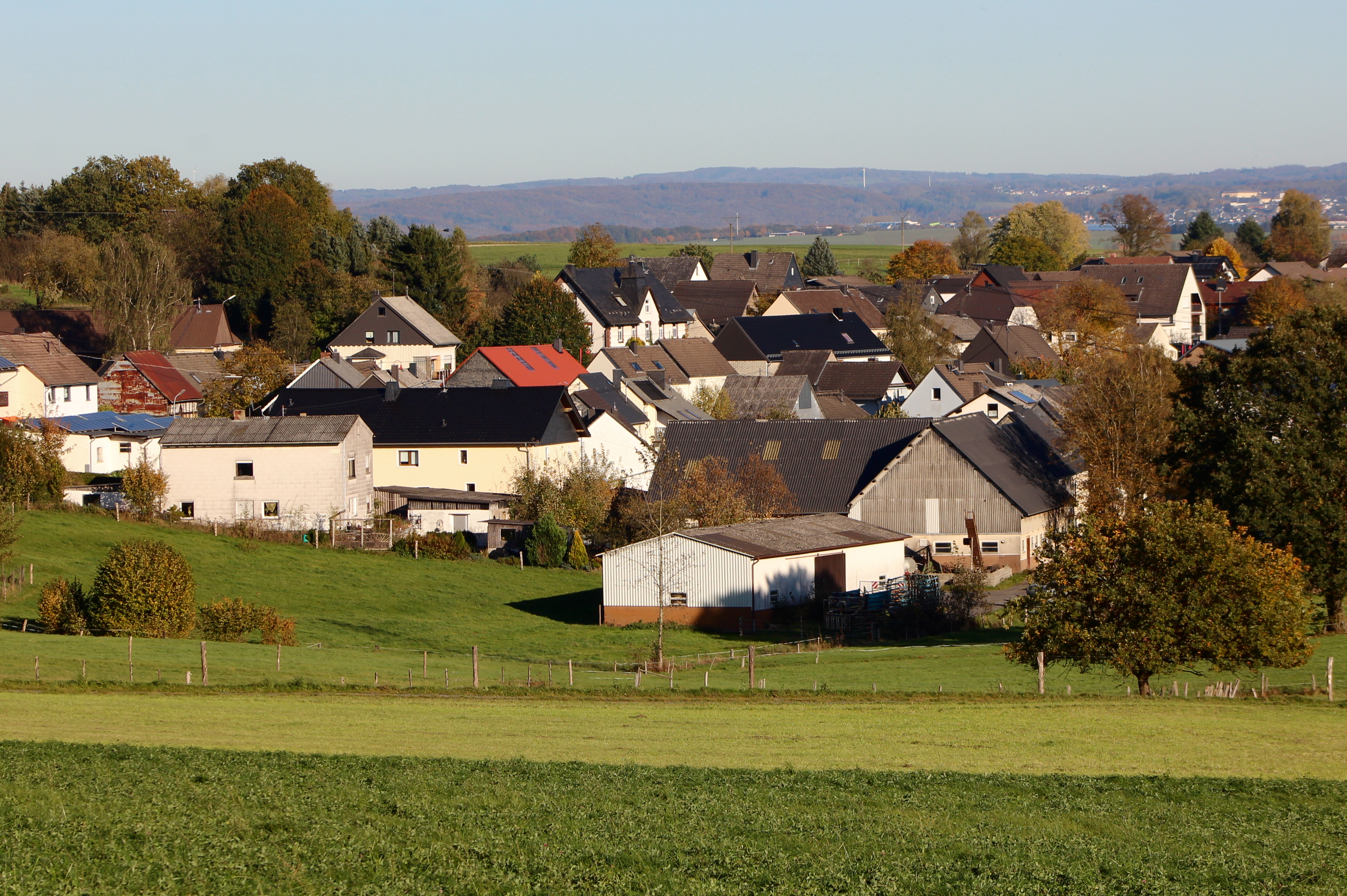

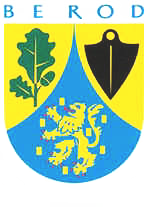
- Coat of arms

- Location of Berod bei Hachenburg within Altenkirchen (Westerwald) district
- Interactive map of Berod bei Hachenburg
- Location within Germany Location within Rhineland-Palatinate
- Coordinates: 50°38′53″N 7°41′28″E
- Country: Germany
- State: Rhineland-Palatinate
- District: Altenkirchen (Westerwald)
- Municipal assoc.: Altenkirchen-Flammersfeld

Government
  - Mayor (2019–24): Stephan Müller

Area
  - Total: 5.05 km^{2} (1.95 sq mi)
- Elevation: 306 m (1,004 ft)

Population (2025-12-31)
  - Total: 637
  - Density: 126/km^{2} (327/sq mi)
- Time zone: UTC+01:00 (CET)
  - Summer (DST): UTC+02:00 (CEST)
- Postal codes: 57614
- Dialling codes: 02680
- Vehicle registration: AK
- Website: www.berod.de

'Berod bei Hachenburg is a village in the municipality of Altenkirchen-Flammersfeld in the district of Altenkirchen, in Rhineland-Palatinate, Germany.
