= Almersbach =

- Municipality
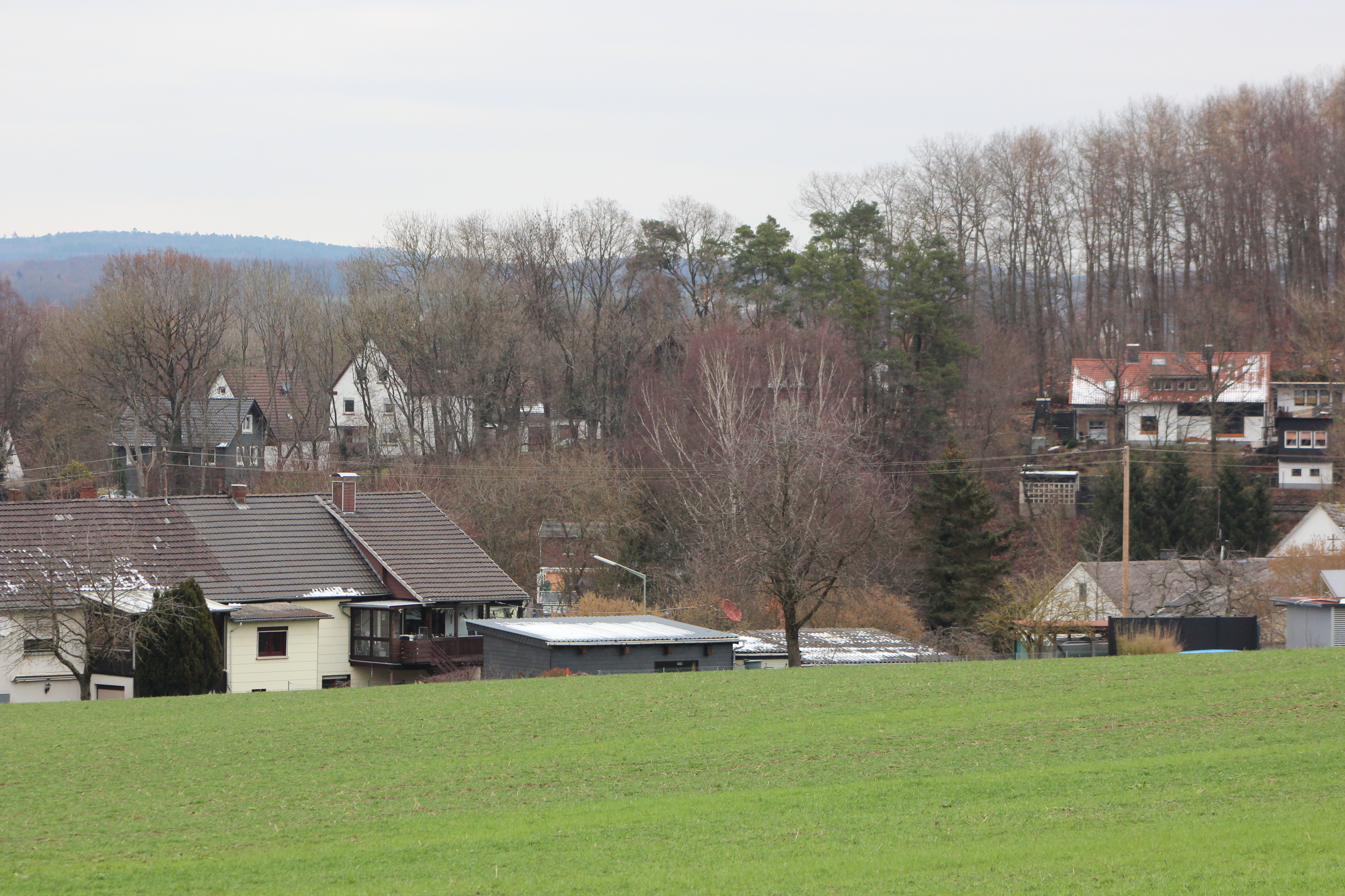

- Coat of arms

- Location of Almersbach within Altenkirchen district
- Interactive map of Almersbach
- Location within Germany Location within Rhineland-Palatinate
- Coordinates: 50°40′28″N 07°38′00″E
- Country: Germany
- State: Rhineland-Palatinate
- District: Altenkirchen
- Municipal assoc.: Altenkirchen-Flammersfeld

Government
  - Mayor (2019–24): Fred Jüngerich

Area
  - Total: 0.61 km^{2} (0.24 sq mi)
- Elevation: 235 m (771 ft)

Population (2025-12-31)
  - Total: 396
  - Density: 650/km^{2} (1,700/sq mi)
- Time zone: UTC+01:00 (CET)
  - Summer (DST): UTC+02:00 (CEST)
- Postal codes: 57610
- Dialling codes: 02681
- Vehicle registration: AK
- Website: www.almersbach.de

Almersbach is a village in the municipality of Altenkirchen-Flammersfeld in the district of Altenkirchen, in Rhineland-Palatinate, Germany.

== Transport ==
The local bus lines 121, 122 and 126 serve Almersbach.
