= Ziegenhain =

- Municipality
- Location of Ziegenhain within Altenkirchen district
- Interactive map of Ziegenhain
- Location within Germany Location within Rhineland-Palatinate
- Coordinates: 50°40′34″N 7°31′32″E
- Country: Germany
- State: Rhineland-Palatinate
- District: Altenkirchen
- Municipal assoc.: Altenkirchen-Flammersfeld

Government
  - Mayor (2019–24): Elmar Chylka

Area
  - Total: 0.71 km^{2} (0.27 sq mi)
- Elevation: 300 m (980 ft)

Population (2025-12-31)
  - Total: 163
  - Density: 230/km^{2} (590/sq mi)
- Time zone: UTC+01:00 (CET)
  - Summer (DST): UTC+02:00 (CEST)
- Postal codes: 57632
- Dialling codes: 02685
- Vehicle registration: AK
- Website: vg-altenkirchen-flammersfeld.de

Ziegenhain is a municipality in the district of Altenkirchen, in Rhineland-Palatinate, Germany. It used to be part of the mayoralty of Weyerbusch.
