= Altenkirchen-Flammersfeld =

- Verbandsgemeinde
- Location of Altenkirchen-Flammersfeld within Altenkirchen district
- Interactive map of Altenkirchen-Flammersfeld
- Location within Germany Location within Rhineland-Palatinate
- Coordinates: 50°41′N 7°39′E
- Country: Germany
- State: Rhineland-Palatinate
- District: Altenkirchen
- Seat: Altenkirchen
- Subdivisions: 67 municipalities

Area
  - Total: 228.99 km^{2} (88.41 sq mi)

Population (2025-12-31)
  - Total: 36,501
  - Density: 159.40/km^{2} (412.84/sq mi)
- Time zone: UTC+01:00 (CET)
  - Summer (DST): UTC+02:00 (CEST)
- Website: www.vg-altenkirchen-flammersfeld.de

Altenkirchen-Flammersfeld is a Verbandsgemeinde ("collective municipality") in the district of Altenkirchen, Rhineland-Palatinate, Germany. The seat of the Verbandsgemeinde is in Altenkirchen. It was formed on 1 January 2020 by the merger of the former Verbandsgemeinden Altenkirchen and Flammersfeld. The Verbandsgemeinde Altenkirchen-Flammersfeld consists of the following Ortsgemeinden ("local municipalities"):

1. Almersbach
2. Altenkirchen
3. Bachenberg
4. Berod bei Hachenburg
5. Berzhausen
6. Birnbach
7. Bürdenbach
8. Burglahr
9. Busenhausen
10. Eichelhardt
11. Eichen
12. Ersfeld
13. Eulenberg
14. Fiersbach
15. Flammersfeld
16. Fluterschen
17. Forstmehren
18. Gieleroth
19. Giershausen
20. Güllesheim
21. Hasselbach
22. Helmenzen
23. Helmeroth
24. Hemmelzen
25. Heupelzen
26. Hilgenroth
27. Hirz-Maulsbach
28. Horhausen
29. Idelberg
30. Ingelbach
31. Isert
32. Kescheid
33. Kettenhausen
34. Kircheib
35. Kraam
36. Krunkel
37. Mammelzen
38. Mehren
39. Michelbach
40. Neitersen
41. Niedersteinebach
42. Obererbach
43. Oberirsen
44. Oberlahr
45. Obersteinebach
46. Oberwambach
47. Ölsen
48. Orfgen
49. Peterslahr
50. Pleckhausen
51. Racksen
52. Reiferscheid
53. Rettersen
54. Rott
55. Schöneberg
56. Schürdt
57. Seelbach
58. Seifen
59. Sörth
60. Stürzelbach
61. Volkerzen
62. Walterschen
63. Werkhausen
64. Weyerbusch
65. Willroth
66. Wölmersen
67. Ziegenhain
