= Berzhausen =

- Municipality
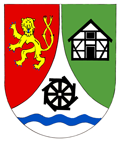
- Coat of arms

- Location of Berzhausen within Altenkirchen district
- Interactive map of Berzhausen
- Location within Germany Location within Rhineland-Palatinate
- Coordinates: 50°39′19″N 7°34′8″E
- Country: Germany
- State: Rhineland-Palatinate
- District: Altenkirchen
- Municipal assoc.: Altenkirchen-Flammersfeld
- Subdivisions: 4

Government
  - Mayor (2019–24): Maik Kunz

Area
  - Total: 2.37 km^{2} (0.92 sq mi)
- Elevation: 200 m (660 ft)

Population (2025-12-31)
  - Total: 193
  - Density: 81.4/km^{2} (211/sq mi)
- Time zone: UTC+01:00 (CET)
  - Summer (DST): UTC+02:00 (CEST)
- Postal codes: 57632
- Dialling codes: 02685
- Vehicle registration: AK
- Website: vg-altenkirchen-flammersfeld.de

Berzhausen is a village in the municipality of Altenkirchen-Flammersfeld in the district of Altenkirchen, in Rhineland-Palatinate, Germany

== Traffic ==
Berzhausen is served by the busses of the local bus line 136, the village is located in the area of the transport association Verkehrsverbund Rhein-Mosel (VRM).
