= Mehrbach =

River in Germany

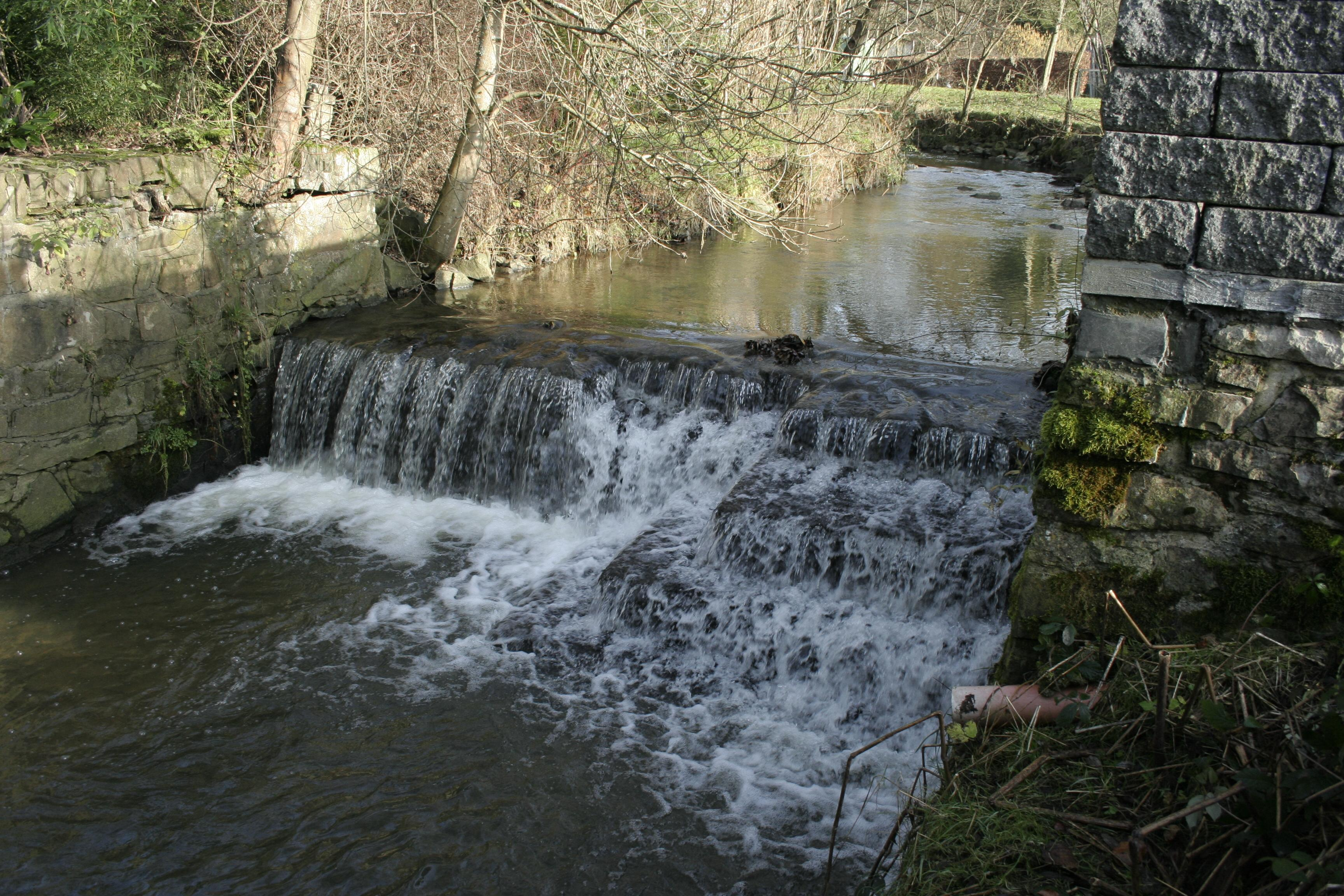
- The Mehrbach near Mehren in the Westerwald

Location
- Country: Germany
- State: Rhineland-Palatinate
- Reference no.: DE: 27164

Physical characteristics
- Source
  - location: North of Werkhausen
  - coordinates: 50°44′24″N 7°32′23″E
  - elevation: ca. 319 m above sea level (NHN)
- Mouth
  - location: Near Ehrenstein into the Wied
  - coordinates: 50°37′02″N 7°27′05″E
  - elevation: ca. 152 m above sea level (NHN)
- Length: 22.944 km (14.257 mi)
- Basin size: 65.868 km^{2} (25.432 sq mi)

Basin features
- Progression: Wied→ Rhine→ North Sea
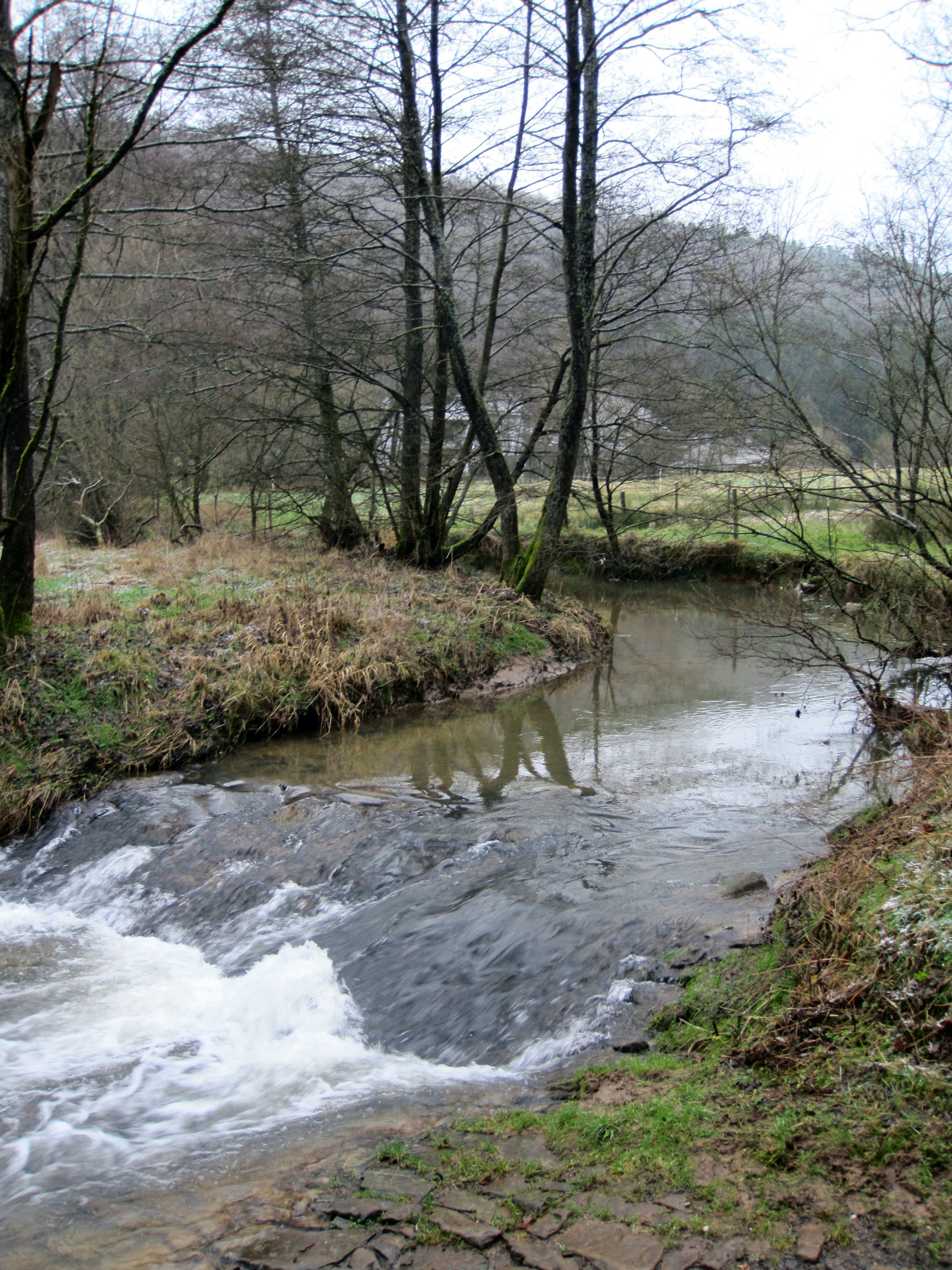
- The Mehrbach looking towards Mehren

The Mehrbach (German pronunciation: [ˈmeːɐ̯bax]) is a river in Rhineland-Palatinate, Germany. It is 23-kilometre-long (14 mi) long, and a tributary of the Wied. Its GKZ is 27164, its catchment has an area of 65.868 km^{2} (25.432 sq mi).

== Course ==
The Mehrbach rises in the north of the Westerwald, north of Werkhausen, in the vicinity of the border between Rhineland-Palatinate and North Rhine-Westphalia, and flows in a southerly direction. On its way to the Wied it initially crosses the territories of Werkhausen, Hasselbach and Forstmehren. It then forms the boundary between the parishes of Ersfeld and Kraam and flows through the village of Mehren in a southerly direction. South of Hirz-Maulsbach to its confluence, the Mehrbach forms the boundary between the districts of Neuwied on the right and Altenkirchen on the left, apart from a break near Dasbach. In Neuwied the Mehrbach flows through the municipality of Asbach with its parishes and hamlets of Altenhofen, Niedermühlen, Kapaunsmühle, Diefenau, Altenburg and Ehrenstein; in the district of Altenkirchen it passes through the municipalities of Kescheid and Rott.

Its left hand tributaries are (from the source) the Werkhausener Bach, the Weyerbuscher Bach and the Ahlbach. Its right bank tributaries are the streams of Retterserbach (called the Scherenbach near its source and also called the Peschbach near Ersfeld), Friesbach, Maulsbach, Hirzbach and Krumbach.

From the hamlet of Dasbach to its mouth the Mehrbach flows through the Rhine-Westerwald Nature Park.

== See also ==
- List of rivers of Rhineland-Palatinate
