= Obernau =

- Ortsteil of Neitersen
- Coat of arms
- Interactive map of Obernau
- Location within Germany Location within Rhineland-Palatinate
- Coordinates: 50°40′0″N 7°34′1″E
- Country: Germany
- State: Rhineland-Palatinate
- District: Altenkirchen
- Municipality: Neitersen

Area
  - Total: 1.48 km^{2} (0.57 sq mi)
- Elevation: 194 m (636 ft)

Population (2019-12-31)
  - Total: 187
  - Density: 126/km^{2} (327/sq mi)
- Time zone: UTC+01:00 (CET)
  - Summer (DST): UTC+02:00 (CEST)
- Postal codes: 57638
- Dialling codes: 02685
- Vehicle registration: AK

Obernau is a village and a former municipality in the district of Altenkirchen, in Rhineland-Palatinate, in western Germany. Since January 2021, it is part of the municipality Neitersen.

== Traffic ==
Obernau is connected to the local bus lines 136 and 139.
