= Greifenstein Castle (Hesse) =

Greifenstein
- Greifenstein
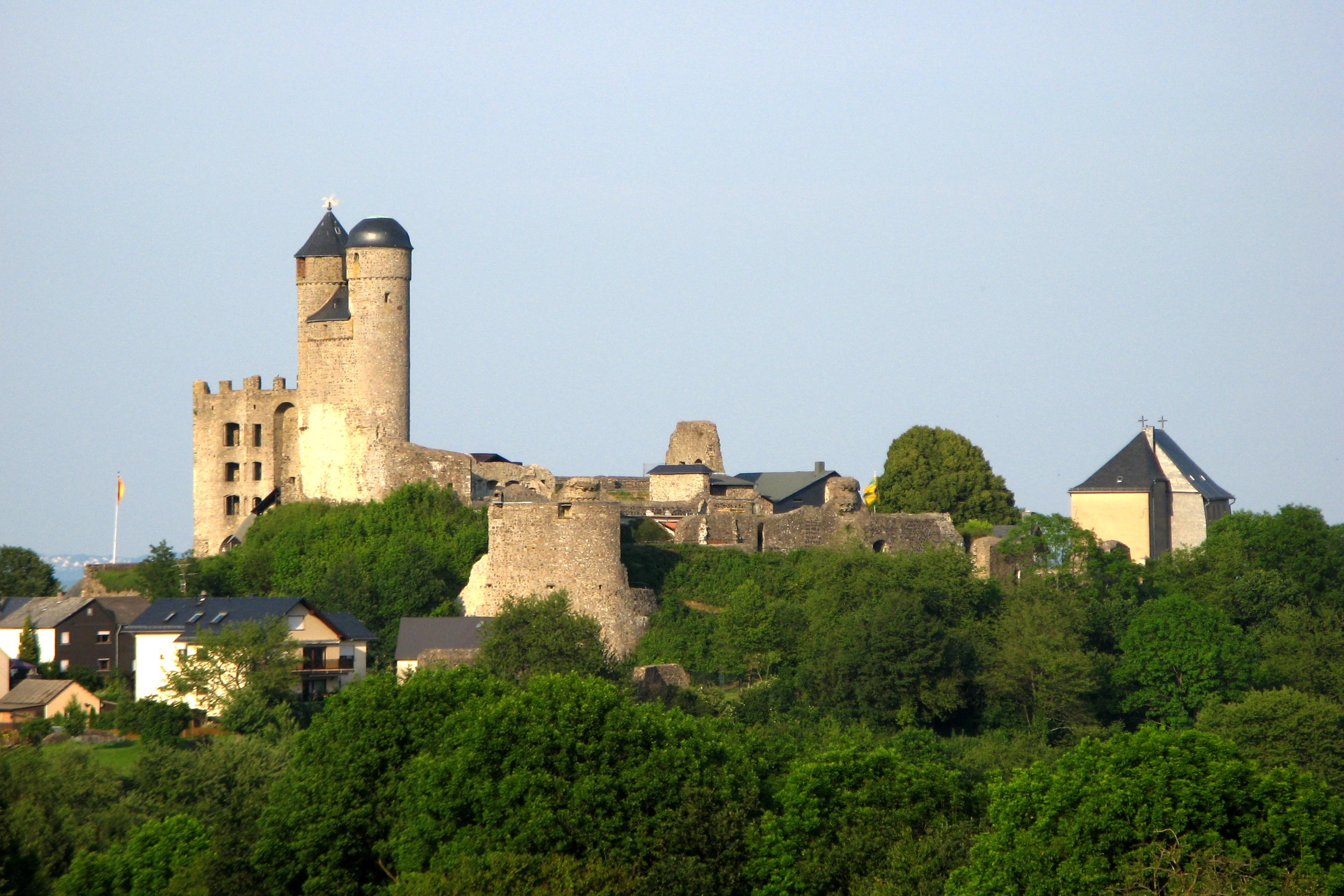
- General view of the castle

Site information
- Type: hill castle
- Code: DE-HE
- Condition: ruins, partially preserved

Location
- Coordinates: 50°37′14″N 8°17′40″E
- Height: 441 m above sea level (NHN)

Site history
- Built: vor 1160

Garrison information
- Occupants: nobility, counts

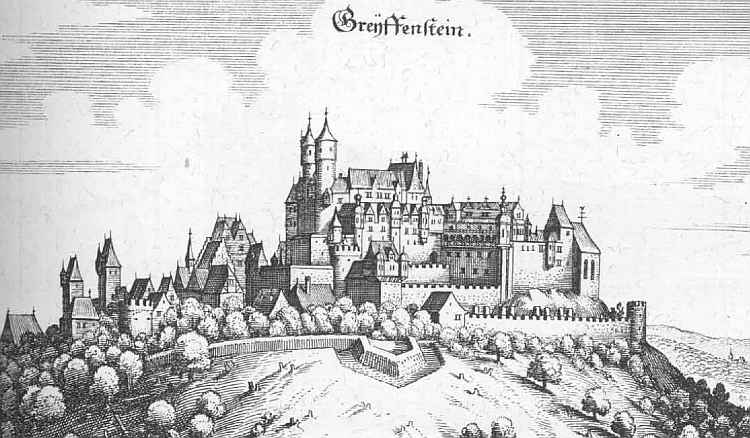
Greifenstein – excerpt from the Topographia Hassiae by Matthäus Merian, 1655

Greifenstein Castle (German: Burg Greifenstein) lies in the eponymous village of Greifenstein in the county of Lahn-Dill-Kreis in Middle Hesse, Germany. It is a geo point in the national geopark of Westerwald-Lahn-Taunus.

== Location ==
The hill castle stands on a hill in the Dill Westerwald and has a good view over the Dill valley. At 441 m (1,447 ft) above sea level (NN) it is the highest castle in the county of Lahn-Dill. The castle is a highly visible landmark. It is signed from the A 45 motorway.

== History ==
The hill castle was first recorded in 1160. In 1298 it was destroyed by the counts of Nassau and Solms, as was Lichtenstein, which was not rebuilt. In 1315 it was enfeoffed by the House of Habsburg (Albert I had purchased the castle from Kraft of Greifenstein) to the Counts of Nassau. After having several owners, it had become dilapidated by 1676 and was then converted into a Baroque schloss by William Maurice of Solms-Greifenstein. After the counts moved to Braunfels in 1693 the site fell into ruins.

In 1969 the castle ruins were gifted to the Greifenstein Society, who have since looked after the preservation of the site, which is open to the public and incorporates a restaurant. The castle is a heritage site in the meaning of the Hessian Monument Conservation Act. Since 1995, its restoration has also been supported by the Federal Republic of Germany because it has been classified as a Monument of National Significances (Denkmal von nationaler Bedeutung).

== Description ==
The circular walk across the castle terrain leads to a gaol with torture implements, weapons and a wine cellar, living rooms and a twin-towered bergfried accessible on a spiral staircase. On the pointed roof of the Brother Tower (Bruderturm) there is a gryphon (German: Greif, a reference to the name of the castle) as a weather vane. In the tower itself is a peal of three bells with strike tones of F^{#1}, A^{1} and C^{2}.

Attractions include the Village and Castle Museum (Dorf- und Burgmuseum), one of the few double chapels in Germany. The Chapel of St. Catherine was built in 1462 as a fortified church in the Gothic style. When the castle was converted into the Baroque style the castle courtyard was filled with earth with the result that, today, the chapel is below ground level. It contains frescoes and arrow slits as well as casemates with vaulted ceilings and fighting rooms. The Baroque church built above the fortified chapel from 1687 to 1702 is richly decorated with stuccos and is of the Italian Early Baroque period. Upper and lower churches are linked by a staircase.

Walks around the castle and an educational herb garden make the site a popular destination.

== Gallery ==
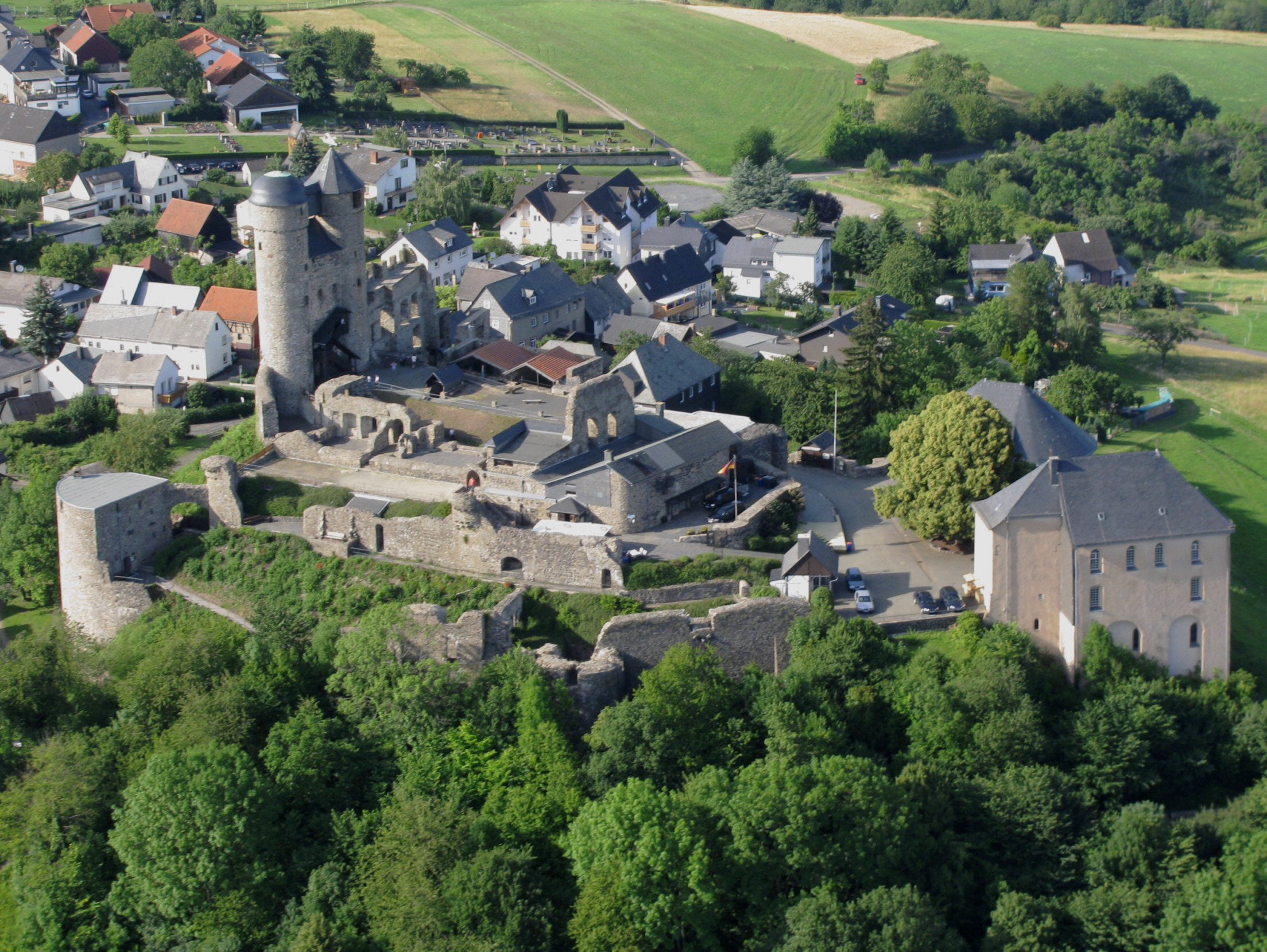
Aerial view

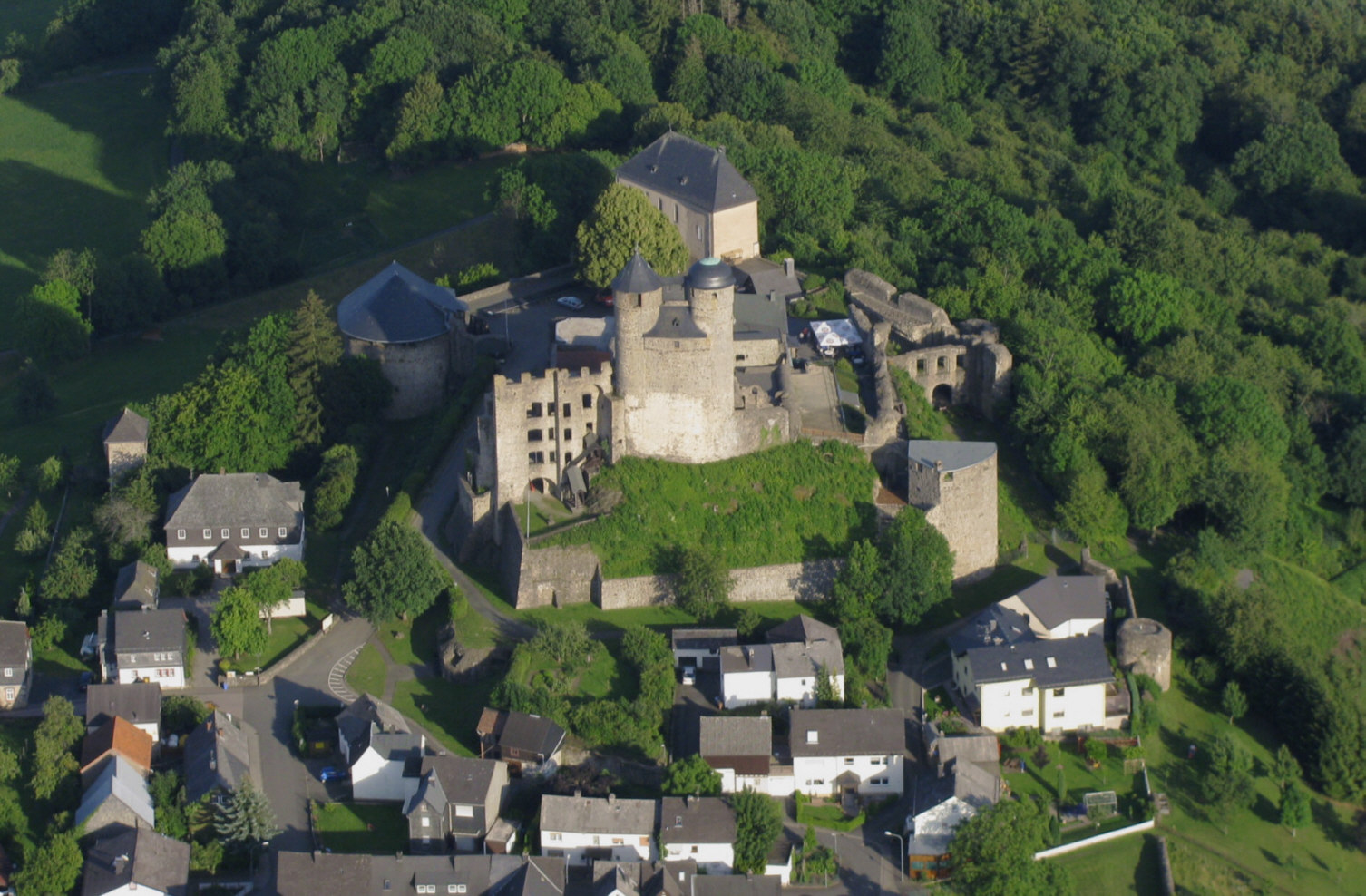
Front view from the air

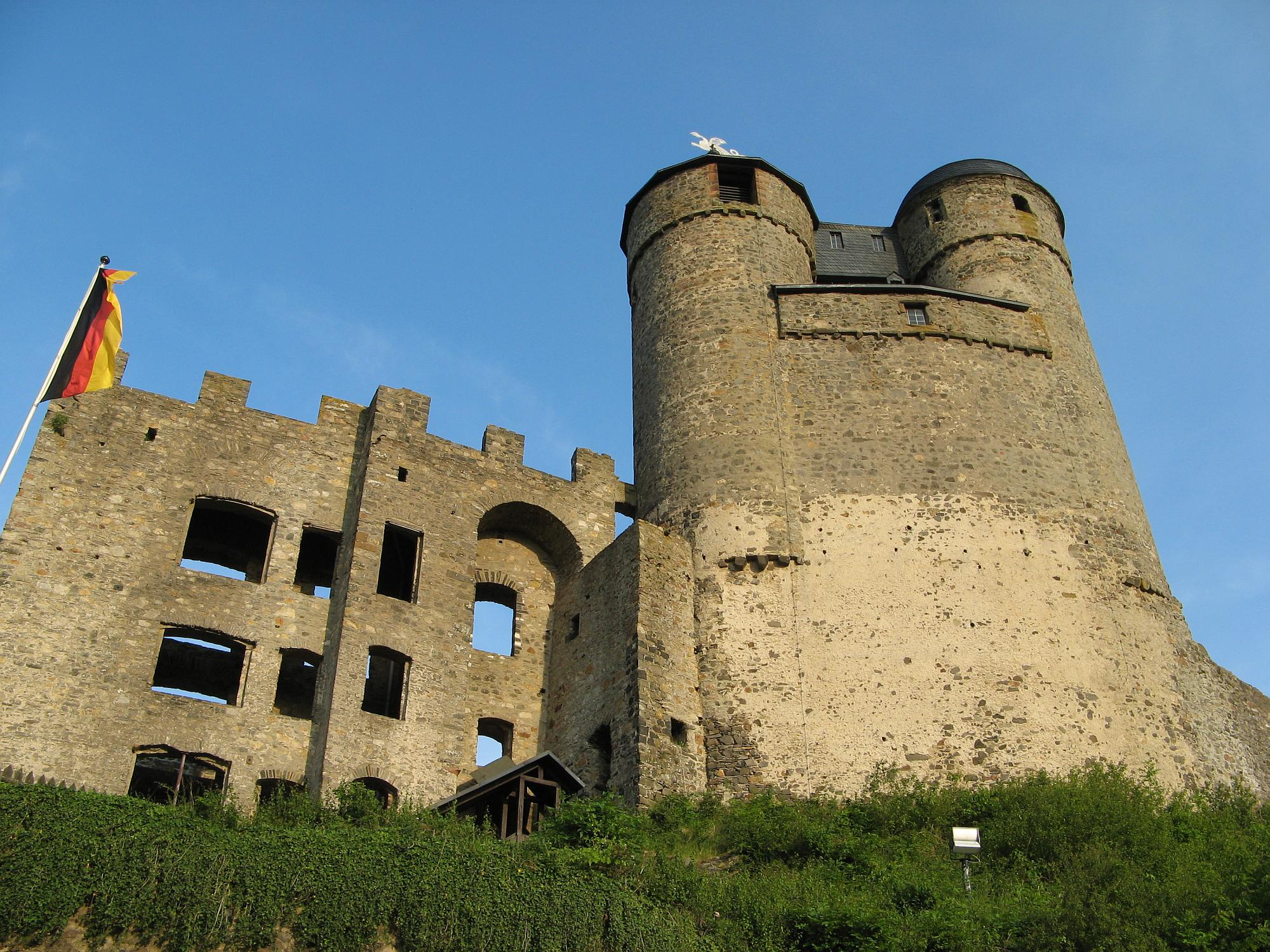
Front view

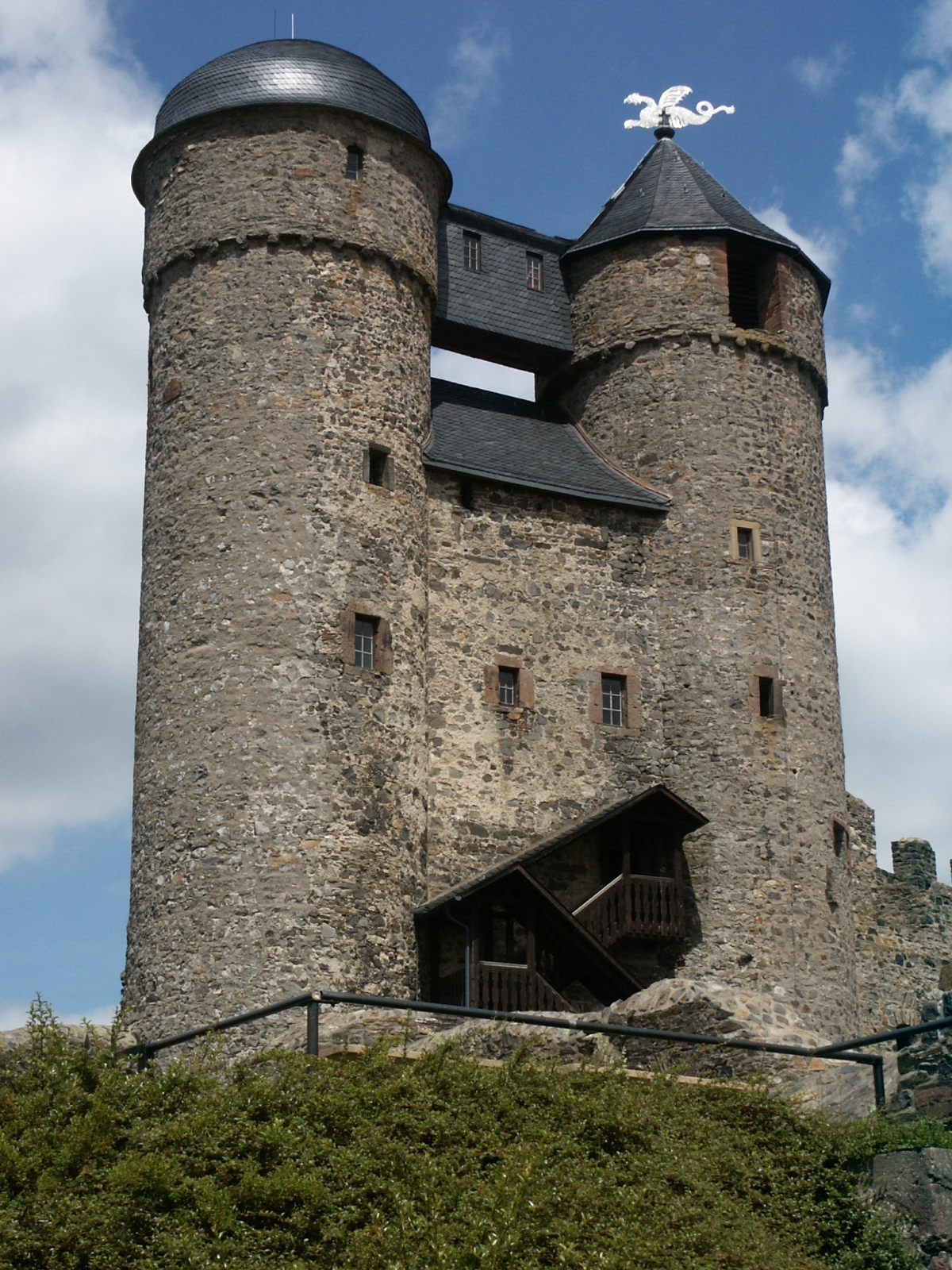
The twin towers

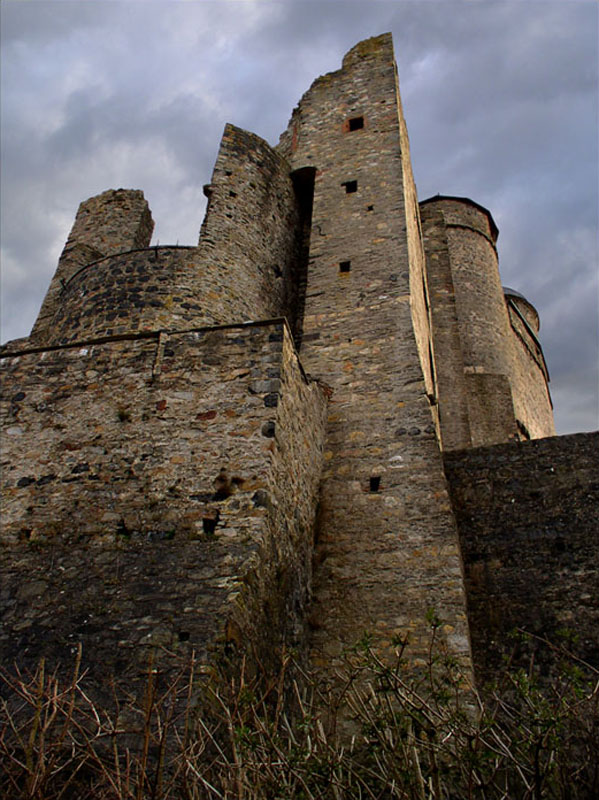
Mystical side

== Literature ==
- Georg Ulrich Großmann: Mittel- und Südhessen : Lahntal, Taunus, Rheingau, Wetterau, Frankfurt und Maintal, Kinzig, Vogelsberg, Rhön, Bergstraße und Odenwald. DuMont, Cologne, 1995, ISBN 3-7701-2957-1 (=DuMont Kunst-Reiseführer), pp. 45–48.
- Rudolf Knappe: Mittelalterliche Burgen in Hessen: 800 Burgen, Burgruinen und Burgstätten. 3rd edn., Wartberg-Verlag, Gudensberg-Gleichen, 2000, ISBN 3-86134-228-6, pp. 287–288.
- Schlösser, Burgen, alte Mauern. Herausgegeben vom Hessendienst der Staatskanzlei, Wiesbaden, 1990, pp. 148–150, ISBN 3-89214-017-0.
