= Hanfbach =

River in Germany

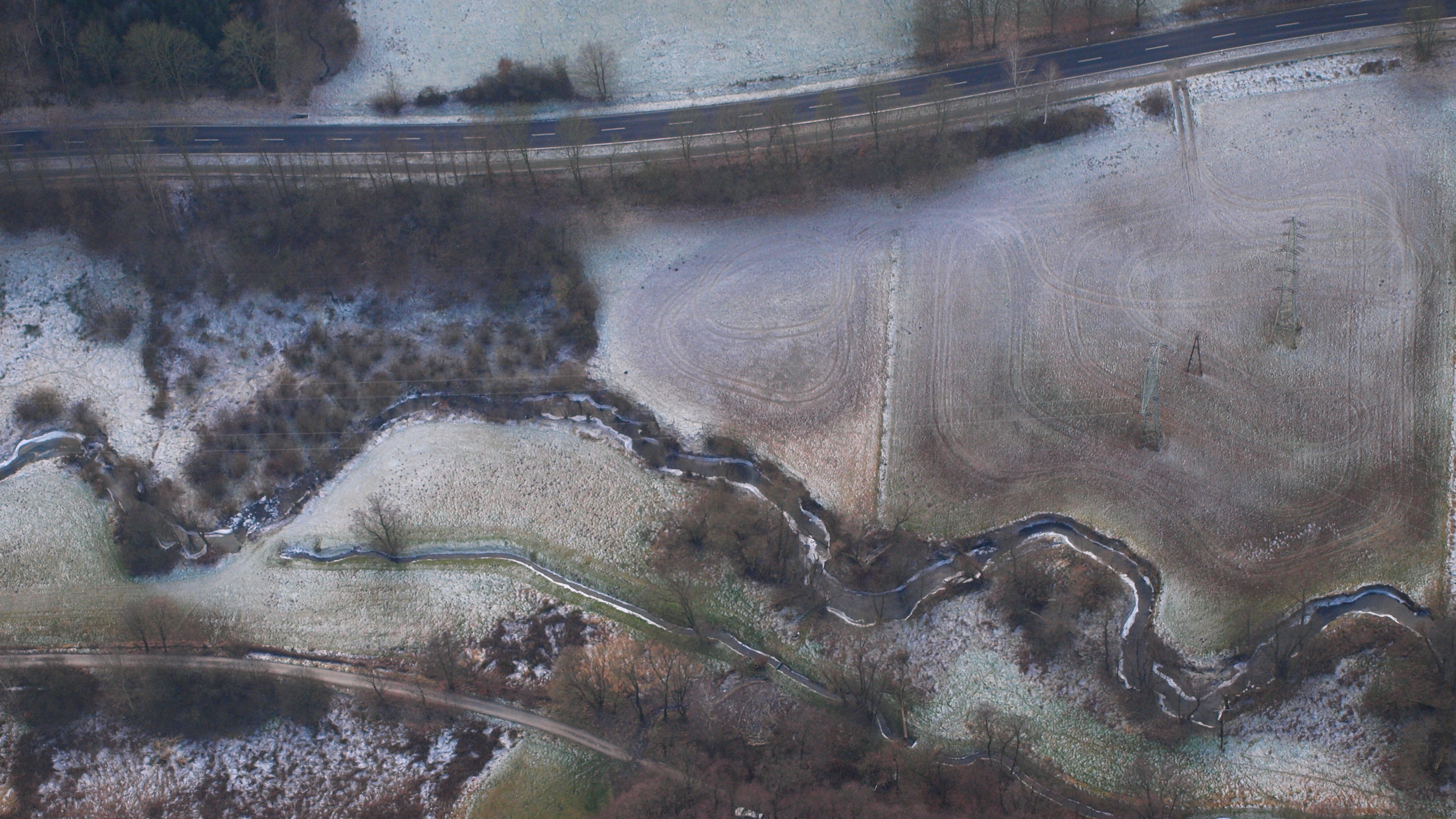

Location
- Country: Germany
- State: North Rhine-Westphalia

Physical characteristics
- Mouth
  - location: Sieg
  - coordinates: 50.7737°N 7.2899°E
- Length: 19.0 km (11.8 mi)

Basin features
- Progression: Sieg→ Rhine→ North Sea

Hanfbach is a river of North Rhine-Westphalia, Germany. It flows into the Sieg in Hennef.

== See also ==
- List of rivers of North Rhine-Westphalia
