= Helmenzen =

- Municipality
- Location of Helmenzen within Altenkirchen district
- Interactive map of Helmenzen
- Location within Germany Location within Rhineland-Palatinate
- Coordinates: 50°41′43″N 7°37′10″E
- Country: Germany
- State: Rhineland-Palatinate
- District: Altenkirchen
- Municipal assoc.: Altenkirchen-Flammersfeld

Government
  - Mayor (2019–24): Klaus Schneider

Area
  - Total: 4.15 km^{2} (1.60 sq mi)
- Elevation: 260 m (850 ft)

Population (2025-12-31)
  - Total: 951
  - Density: 229/km^{2} (594/sq mi)
- Time zone: UTC+01:00 (CET)
  - Summer (DST): UTC+02:00 (CEST)
- Postal codes: 57612
- Dialling codes: 02681
- Vehicle registration: AK
- Website: helmenzen.de

Helmenzen is a village in the municipality of Altenkirchen-Flammersfeld in the district of Altenkirchen, in Rhineland-Palatinate, in western Germany.

== Museum barn ==
Museumsscheune Helmenzen (Museum barn Helmenzen) is a museum of local history which shows the life at home and on farms in the past before electrity has been established in the Altenkirchen area.

== Transport ==
The local bus lines 250 and 251 connect Helmenzen to the public transport, Helmenzen is located in the zone number 910 of the transport association Verkehrsverbund Rhein-Mosel (VRM).
