= Neitersen =

- Municipality
- Location of Neitersen within Altenkirchen district
- Interactive map of Neitersen
- Location within Germany Location within Rhineland-Palatinate
- Coordinates: 50°40′07″N 7°35′02″E
- Country: Germany
- State: Rhineland-Palatinate
- District: Altenkirchen
- Municipal assoc.: Altenkirchen-Flammersfeld

Government
  - Mayor (since 2024): Frank Bettgenhaeuser

Area
  - Total: 7.12 km^{2} (2.75 sq mi)
- Elevation: 198 m (650 ft)

Population (2025-12-31)
  - Total: 1,115
  - Density: 157/km^{2} (406/sq mi)
- Time zone: UTC+01:00 (CET)
  - Summer (DST): UTC+02:00 (CEST)
- Postal codes: 57638
- Dialling codes: 02681
- Vehicle registration: AK
- Website: neitersen.com

Neitersen is a municipality in the district of Altenkirchen, in Rhineland-Palatinate, in western Germany.

== Geography ==
Neitersen is 4 miles southwest of Altenkirchen on the river Wied. The village divides in the districts Neiterschen, Niederölfen, Kahlhardt, Fladersbach, Obernau and Neitersen. Neitersen is 700 feet above sealevel.

== History ==
On 1 March 1262, Countess Mechthild, the widow of Count Henry III of Sayn, made an agreement with the Archbishop of Cologne, Conrad of Hochstaden. In this deed, several Dienstleute are listed, who were to attend to the countess's service for her lifetime. They included three people, namely Henriche, Gobelin and Gylise of Nithirshusen. The original is in the State Archives in Koblenz. This is the first known historical document in which Neitersen is mentioned.

In the 18th century, ownership of the local forest changed from the Count of Sayn-Hachenburg, to the local residents in Neitersen.

1848, the famous mayor from Weyerbusch Friedrich Wilhelm Raiffeisen founded the first school in Neitersen. The building still exists.

In 1882, construction on the railway from Siershahn to Altenkirchen began. On 30 May 1884, passenger services were inaugurated and a railway station and post office were built in Neitersen.

There is a report in German available how the name Neitersen got established. It is written by Wilhelm Hundhausen and can be checked here.

Until 1908 there was a mine for iron ore in duty, its name was Emma.

First powerline got established in November 1918 from the local mill into their neighbourhood.

After 100 years of service the railway company stopped all passenger transportation in 1984.

== Population ==
Population development (December, 31):

- 1815 – 298
- 1835 – 330
- 1871 – 438
- 1905 – 549
- 1939 – 605
- 1950 – 726
- 1961 – 798
- 1965 – 822
- 1970 – 818
- 1975 – 763
- 1980 – 762
- 1985 – 724
- 1987 – 736
- 1990 – 775
- 1995 – 811
- 2000 – 847
- 2005 – 835

Source: Statistisches Landesamt Rheinland-Pfalz

As of the 2022 Census, 903 of it's 1,101 residents were born in Germany itself.

== Politics ==
The municipal council of Neitersen has 16 elected members and the local Mayor as its chairman.

== Economy and infrastructure ==
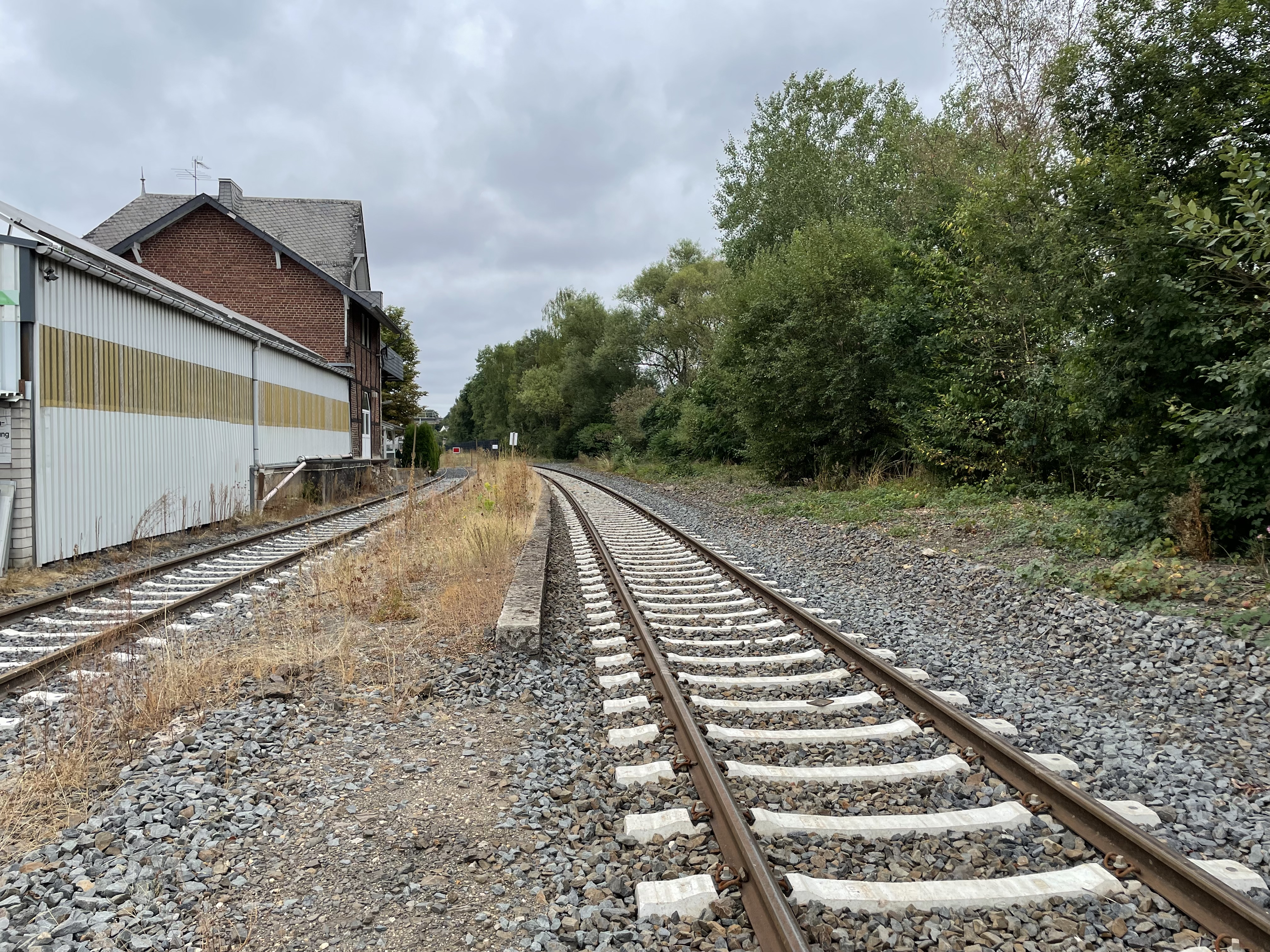
The former train station in Neitersen

Neitersen's access to the local bus network is through the lines 127, 136 and 139. The B 256 (federal highway) and the Engers-Au railway, operated by Lappwaldbahn GmbH, former operator Westerwald Railway, passed through Neitersen, later on the Lappwaldbahn GnbH, nowadays, 2026, the Holzabachtalbahn GmbH. There are three large industrial companies in the village and one award-winning art-house cinema called the Wied Scala.

== Clubs and organizations ==
- Wiedbachtaler Sportfreunde Neitersen is the name of the local soccer team. It is the largest organization in town.
- The voluntary fire brigade Freiwillige Feuerwehr Neitersen was founded in 1938 and is the local division of a larger district brigade Verbandsgemeindefeuerwehr Altenkirchen.
