= Kircheib =

- Municipality
- Location of Kircheib within Altenkirchen district
- Interactive map of Kircheib
- Location within Germany Location within Rhineland-Palatinate
- Coordinates: 50°42′34″N 7°27′25″E
- Country: Germany
- State: Rhineland-Palatinate
- District: Altenkirchen
- Municipal assoc.: Altenkirchen-Flammersfeld

Government
  - Mayor (2019–24): Lothar Bellersheim

Area
  - Total: 6.55 km^{2} (2.53 sq mi)
- Elevation: 312 m (1,024 ft)

Population (2025-12-31)
  - Total: 553
  - Density: 84.4/km^{2} (219/sq mi)
- Time zone: UTC+01:00 (CET)
  - Summer (DST): UTC+02:00 (CEST)
- Postal codes: 57635
- Dialling codes: 02683
- Vehicle registration: AK
- Website: kircheib.de

Kircheib is a municipality in the district of Altenkirchen, in Rhineland-Palatinate, in western Germany. In 1796, the Battle of Kircheib was fought near the village between France and Austria as part of the War of the First Coalition.
