= Mehren =

- Municipality
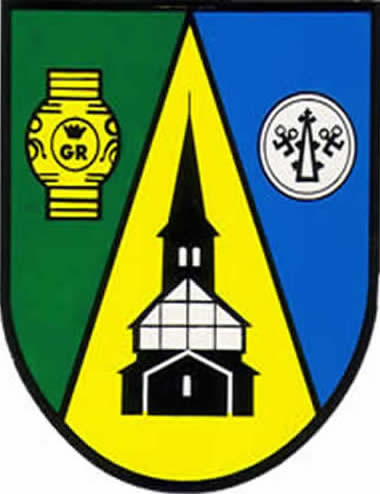
- Coat of arms

- Location of Mehren within Altenkirchen district
- Interactive map of Mehren
- Location within Germany Location within Rhineland-Palatinate
- Coordinates: 50°41′12″N 7°30′35″E
- Country: Germany
- State: Rhineland-Palatinate
- District: Altenkirchen
- Municipal assoc.: Altenkirchen-Flammersfeld

Government
  - Mayor (2019–24): Thomas Schnabel

Area
  - Total: 3.66 km^{2} (1.41 sq mi)
- Elevation: 230 m (750 ft)

Population (2025-12-31)
  - Total: 482
  - Density: 132/km^{2} (341/sq mi)
- Time zone: UTC+01:00 (CET)
  - Summer (DST): UTC+02:00 (CEST)
- Postal codes: 57635
- Dialling codes: 02686
- Vehicle registration: AK
- Website: www.fachwerkdorf-mehren.de

Mehren (German pronunciation: [ˈmeːʁən]) is a municipality in the district of Altenkirchen, in Rhineland-Palatinate, in western Germany.

The river Mehrbach flows through the village.
