= Greifenstein =

Municipality in Hesse, Germany

- Municipality
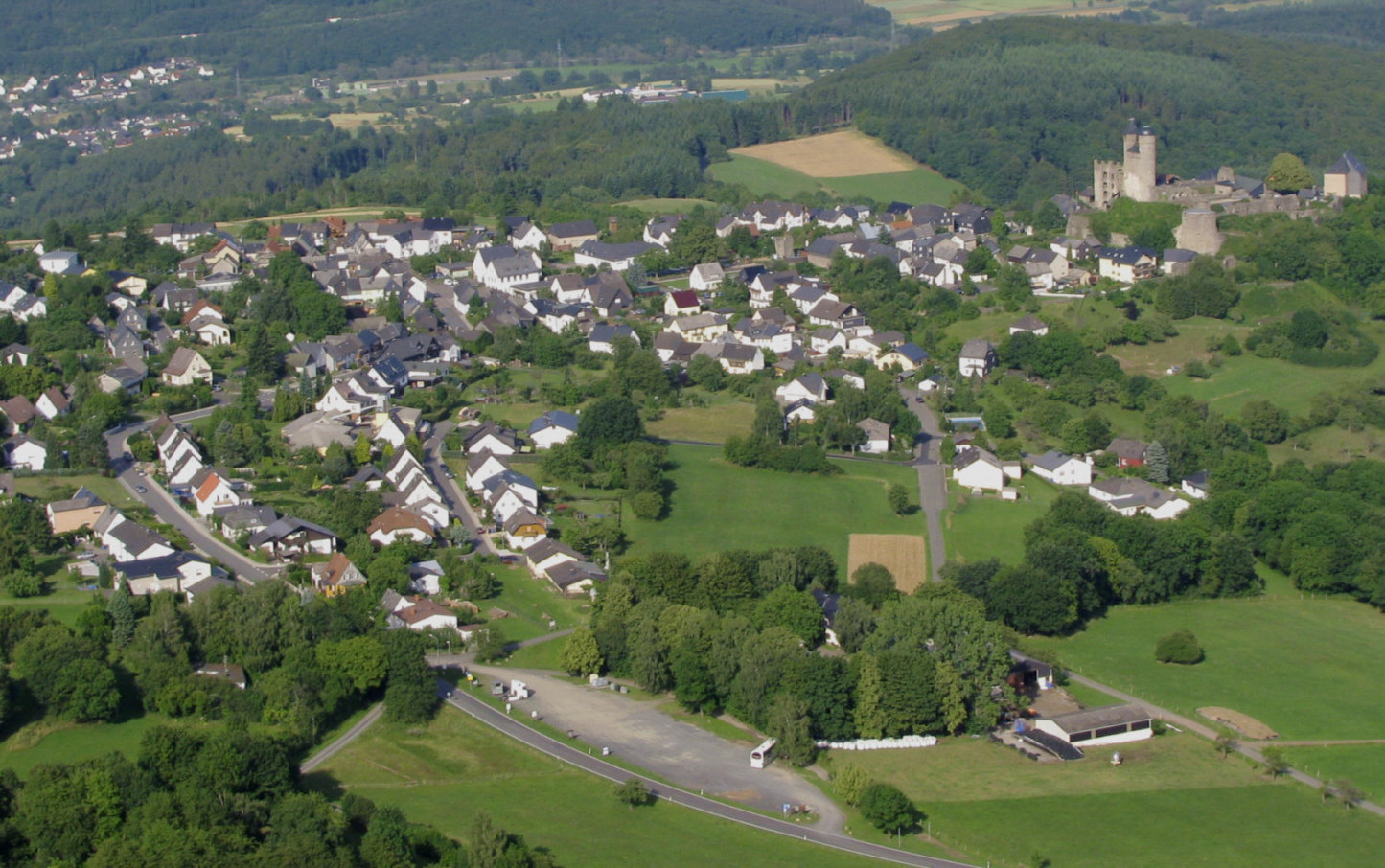
- Aerial view of Greifenstein, Greifenstein Castle to the right

- Coat of arms

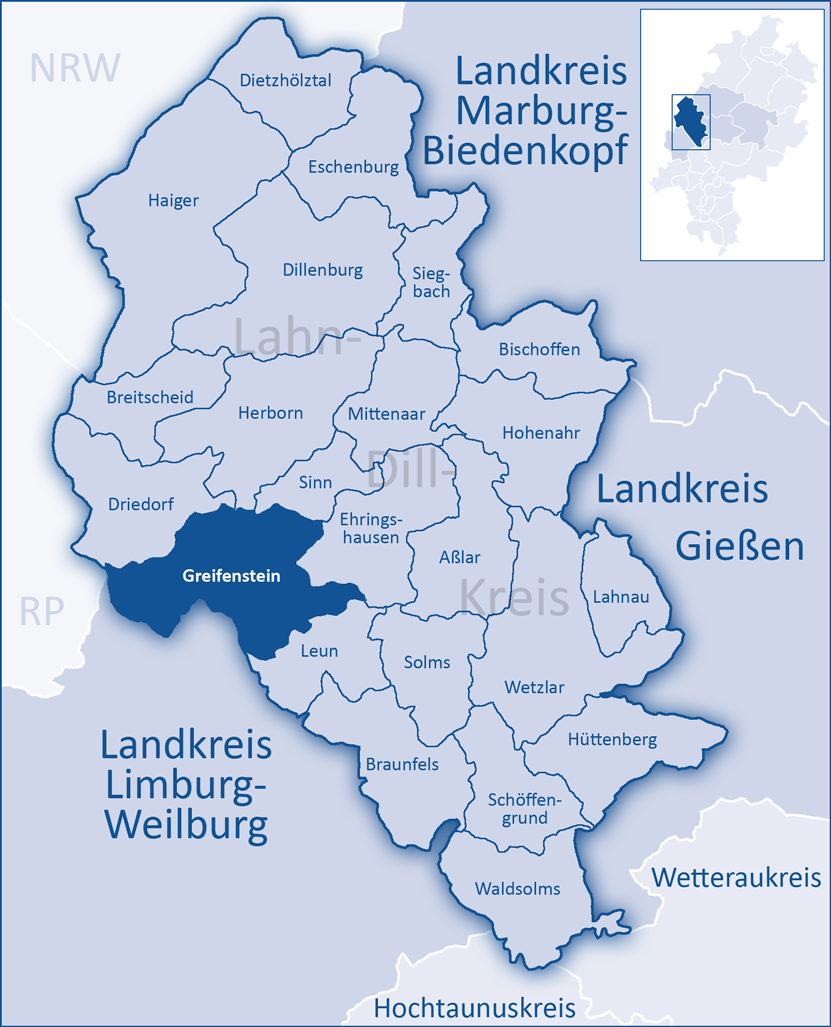
- Location of Greifenstein within Lahn-Dill-Kreis district
- Interactive map of Greifenstein
- Location within Germany Location within Hesse
- Coordinates: 50°36′34″N 08°14′35″E
- Country: Germany
- State: Hesse
- Admin. region: Gießen
- District: Lahn-Dill-Kreis

Government
  - Mayor (2018–24): Marion Sander (Ind.)

Area
  - Total: 67.4 km^{2} (26.0 sq mi)
- Elevation: 273 m (896 ft)

Population (2025-12-31)
  - Total: 6,533
  - Density: 96.9/km^{2} (251/sq mi)
- Time zone: UTC+01:00 (CET)
  - Summer (DST): UTC+02:00 (CEST)
- Postal codes: 35753
- Dialling codes: 02775, 02779, 06449, 06473, 06478, 06477
- Vehicle registration: LDK
- Website: www.greifenstein.de

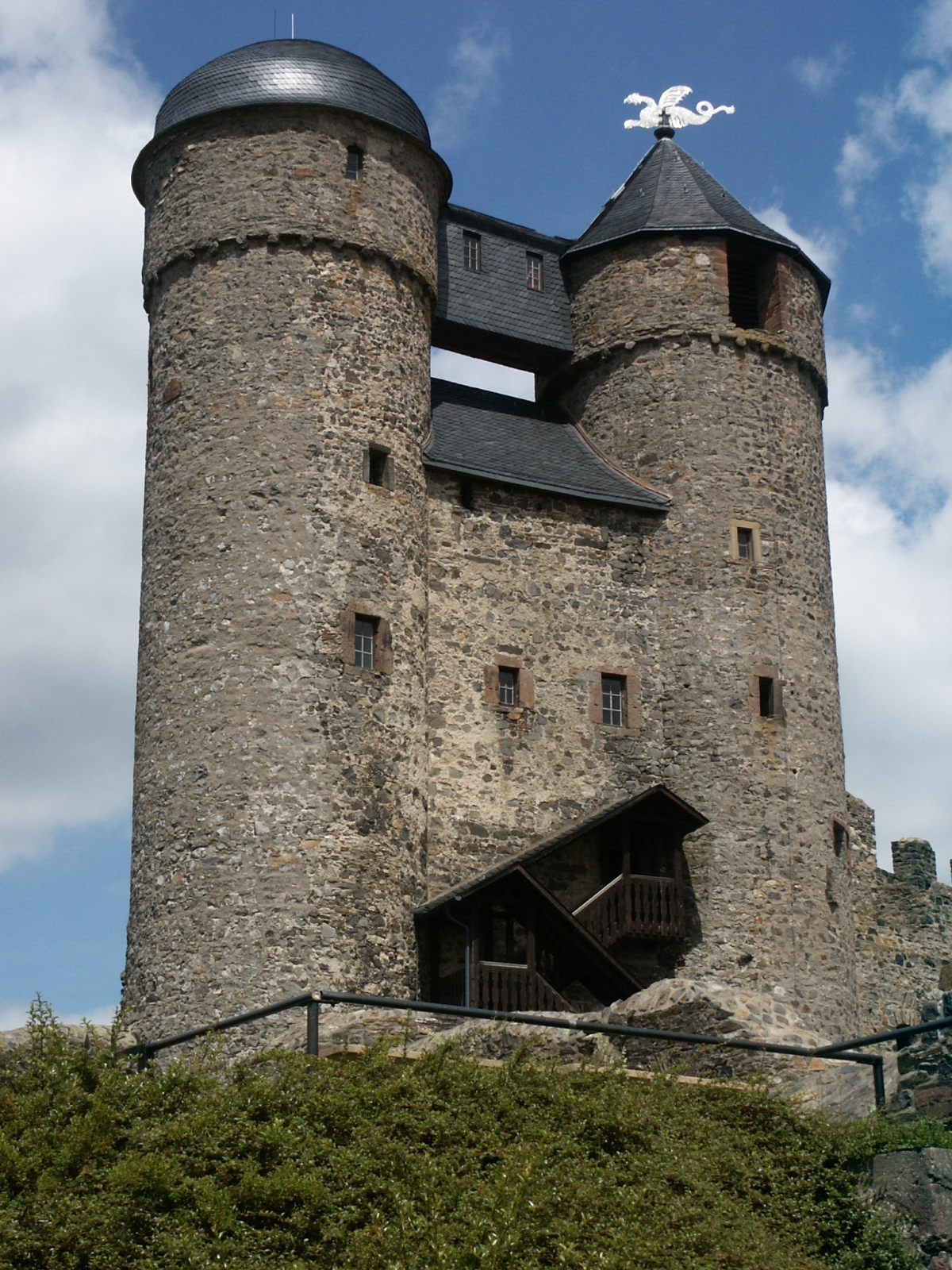
Greifenstein Castle

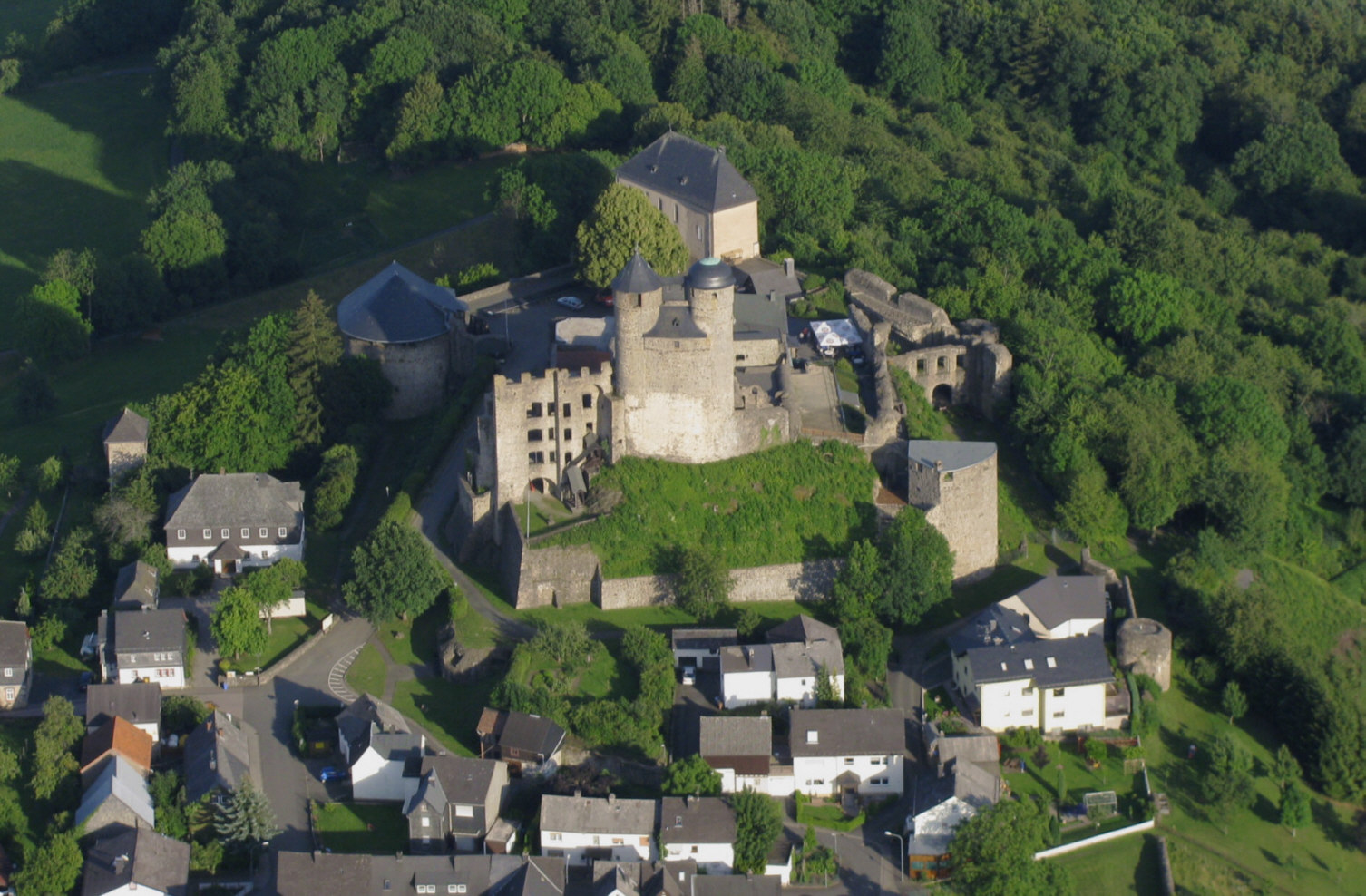
Greifenstein Castle

Greifenstein (German pronunciation: [ˈɡʁaɪfn̩ˌʃtaɪn]) is a municipality in the Lahn-Dill-Kreis in Hesse, Germany. Its administrative seat is Beilstein. Greifenstein covers 67.43 km^{2} on the eastern slope of the Westerwald range. It was named for the castle of the same name in the constituent community of the same name. Greifenstein is the site of the German Bell Museum (Deutsches Glockenmuseum), which holds about fifty bells that show the historical development of bell pouring and manufacture.

== Geography ==
=== Neighbouring communities ===
Greifenstein borders in the northwest on the community of Driedorf, in the north on the town of Herborn and the community of Sinn, in the east on the community of Ehringshausen, in the south on the town of Leun (all in the Lahn-Dill-Kreis) and the community of Löhnberg, and in the southwest on the community of Mengerskirchen (both in Limburg-Weilburg).

=== Constituent communities ===
The community was founded as part of Hesse's municipal reforms in 1977 from the following centres (with population figures as at 31 December 2004):

- Allendorf: 1355 inhabitants
- Arborn: 609 inhabitants
- Beilstein: 1655 inhabitants
- Greifenstein: 631 inhabitants
- Holzhausen: 972 inhabitants
- Nenderoth: 408 inhabitants
- Odersberg: 285 inhabitants
- Rodenberg: 210 inhabitants
- Rodenroth: 438 inhabitants
- Ulm: 751 inhabitants

Total: 7409 inhabitants

== History ==
=== Allendorf ===
Allendorf had its first documentary mention in 774. In the 14th century, the village was stricken with the Plague. The population in outlying hamlets had high mortality, and survivors moved to the village. It is said that the name Allendorf comes from this episode in the village's history, specifically from the phrase Alle ein Dorf – "All one village".

After the Thirty Years' War, Allendorf became Prussian. The border with Nassau, no stranger to war, ran right by the village.

In the early 1920s, the Ulmbach Valley Railway came to town to transport raw materials from the Ulm Valley.

In 1934, Allendorf became an independent community in the Wetzlar district.

Allendorf lost 75 young men in the fighting in the Second World War. A memorial was erected to them. After the war, ethnic Germans expelled from the territories of East Prussia, Pomerania and Silesia, resettled in Allendorf.

In 1972, Allendorf was united with Ulm and Holzhausen as the community of Ulmtal. This was dissolved in 1977 in the municipal reforms. Allendorf was amalgamated into Greifenstein, over citizens' protests at the Landtag in Wiesbaden.

In the mid-1970s, Allendorf was a climatic spa. It attracted tourists mostly from the Ruhr area.

=== Beilstein ===
Beilstein is the result of three neighbouring villages growing together, Beilstein, Haiern and Wallendorf, the last of which had its first documentary mention in 774. Beilstein was granted town rights on 18 February 1321. After the Thirty Years' War, it lost these rights. Haiern did not become part of Beilstein until 1941.

== Politics ==
=== Municipal council ===
The municipal elections on 26 March 2006 yielded the following results:

SPD	14 seats
CDU	11 seats
FDP	3 seats
FWG	3 seats

Note: FWG is a citizens' coalition.

=== Partnerships ===
- Sankt Andrä-Wördern, Austria since 1980

== Transport and infrastructure ==
The greater community lies in a triangle formed by the towns of Wetzlar, Weilburg and Herborn. The Ehringshausen and Herborn Süd Autobahn interchanges on the A 45 can be reached in 10 to 20 minutes, as is also true for Federal Highway (Bundesstraße) 49. Each constituent community is connected to the bus network.

From 1922 a railway line ran from the Lahntal Railway by way of Leun-Stockhausen, Leun-Bissenberg, Greifenstein's constituent communities of Allendorf, Ulm and Holzhausen to Beilstein. This line was once to have been built to Driedorf to meet the Westerwald cross-regional line. In the mid 1970s, however, passenger service ceased on the line, and in the early 1990s so did goods service, shortly whereafter the tracks were torn up.

Since the early 1970s, Allendorf has been home to a big event hall with seating for up to 600 people. In Beilstein, a sport hall is on hand. Each constituent community also has its own community house for events.

== Education ==
The community has three kindergartens at its disposal in Allendorf, Beilstein and Nenderoth. Two primary schools can be found in the community, namely in Allendorf and Beilstein.

== Tourism ==
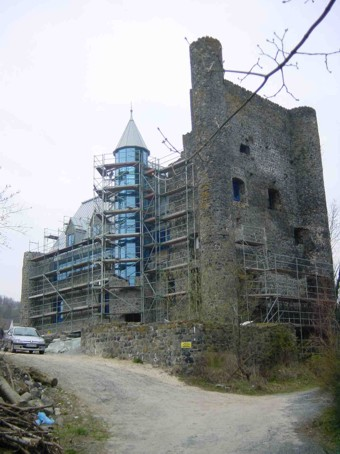
Beilstein Castle during reconstruction in 2002

Each constituent community has half-timbered houses, built in different styles, that are well worth seeing. Moreover, there are the following attractions:

- Greifenstein Castle with bell museum, formerly owned by the princes of Solms-Braunfels
- the Altes Haus ("Old House") in Holzhausen
- church with village well and 1000-year-old oak in Allendorf
- Beilstein Castle (partially reconstructed ruins), first mentioned in 1229, formerly owned by the Counts of Nassau-Beilstein, and church in Beilstein

For athletes, the community has over 100 km of well built cycling and hiking trails. One attraction is the Ulmbach Reservoir between Holzhausen and Beilstein. It offers a campground, a sunbathing field and a bathing area. In summer, the DLRG sees to safety. The pathway (about 2.7 km long) is used by many hikers, cyclists, inline skaters and Nordic walkers.

In Arborn is a weekend cottage neighbourhood that has an outdoor swimming pool at its disposal. A further outdoor swimming pool is to be found in Nenderoth. Skilifts for winter sports can be found in Greifenstein and Arborn.

Since 2002 there has been in Allendorf the Outdoor-Center-Lahntal, a nature-linked leisure and adventure park. Overnight stays in tepees, and workshops for adults and children may be booked here.
