= Cologne High Military and Escort Road =

Historical trading route in Germany

The Cologne High Military and Escort Road (German: Cölnische Hohe Heer- und Geleitstraße, also called the Hohe Straße) is a historical trading route that ran from the city of Cologne via the imperial cities of Wetzlar and Friedberg to Frankfurt within the Holy Roman Empire.

This historic road ran along the eastern edge of the Westerwald mountains via Greifenstein and crossed the River Lahn in Wetzlar. In addition to its function as a trading road, this highway was used as a pilgrims' way from Cologne to Marburg. The so-called Elizabeth Path (Elisabethpfad) had the grave of Saint Elizabeth of Thuringia in Marburg as its destination. This historical pilgrimage route was waymarked as the Way of St. James in 2007. The section of the old road between Butzbach and Wetzlar is recorded in 1315 and 1349 in deeds no. 441 and 758 at Arnsburg Abbey.

== Literatur ==
- Friedrich Kofler: Alte Straßen in Hessen, Trier, 1893
- Georg Landau: Beiträge zur Geschichte der alten Heer- und Handelsstraßen in Deutschland.
- Christian Daniel Vogel (1843), Beschreibung des Herzogthums Nassau (in German), Wiesbaden: Beyerle
