= Hirz-Maulsbach =

- Municipality
- Location of Hirz-Maulsbach within Altenkirchen district
- Interactive map of Hirz-Maulsbach
- Location within Germany Location within Rhineland-Palatinate
- Coordinates: 50°41′10″N 7°29′6″E
- Country: Germany
- State: Rhineland-Palatinate
- District: Altenkirchen
- Municipal assoc.: Altenkirchen-Flammersfeld

Government
  - Mayor (2019–24): Dieter Zimmermann

Area
  - Total: 6.14 km^{2} (2.37 sq mi)
- Elevation: 258 m (846 ft)

Population (2025-12-31)
  - Total: 304
  - Density: 49.5/km^{2} (128/sq mi)
- Time zone: UTC+01:00 (CET)
  - Summer (DST): UTC+02:00 (CEST)
- Postal codes: 57635
- Dialling codes: 02686
- Vehicle registration: AK
- Website: vg-altenkirchen-flammersfeld.de

Hirz-Maulsbach is a municipality in the district of Altenkirchen, in Rhineland-Palatinate, in western Germany.
