= Daade =

River in Germany

- The Daade in Daaden

Location
- Country: Germany
- State: Rhineland-Palatinate
- Reference no.: DE: 27228

Physical characteristics
- Source
  - location: Not far from the Stegskopf in the High Westerwald (above Emmerzhausen)
  - coordinates: 50°42′24″N 8°01′29″E
  - elevation: ca. 574 m above sea level (NHN)
- Mouth
  - location: On the eastern edge of Alsdorf into the Heller
  - coordinates: 50°46′54″N 7°53′34″E
  - elevation: ca. 196 m above sea level (NHN)
- Length: 16.029 km (9.960 mi)
- Basin size: 53.283 km^{2} (20.573 sq mi)

Basin features
- Progression: Heller→ Sieg→ Rhine→ North Sea

The Daade (also called the Daadenbach) is the largest tributary of the Heller, in the district of Altenkirchen in the northeast of the German state of Rhineland-Palatinate. It flows through the northeastern part of the Westerwald. It is 16.027 kilometres (9.959 mi) long and has a catchment area of 53.28 km^{2} (20.57 sq mi).

The Daade Valley Railway runs along the Daade from Daaden via Alsdorf to Betzdorf, on the main line from Cologne to Siegen.

== Villages ==
The villages on the Daade are:

- Emmerzhausen
- Daaden (largest settlement on the Daade)
- Biersdorf (part of Daaden)
- Niederdreisbach
- Schutzbach
- Alsdorf

== Tributaries ==
The tributaries of the Daade (in downstream order) are the:

- Derscherbach (left, 3.9 km, 9.3 km²) (GKZ 272282)
- Birenbach (right, 2.0 km, 2.3 km²) (GKZ 2722832)
- Friedewalderbach (left, 4.9 km, 8.1 km²) (GKZ 272284)
- Dreisbach (left, 5.6 km, 8.4 km²) (GKZ 272286)
- Schutzbach (left, 3.1 km, 3.6 km²) (GKZ 272288)

All left tributaries have their sources on the Neunkhausen-Weitefeld Plateau, but cut deep valleys in the Heller Upland.

== See also ==
- List of rivers of Rhineland-Palatinate
