= Gutenbach (Wildenbach) =

River in Germany

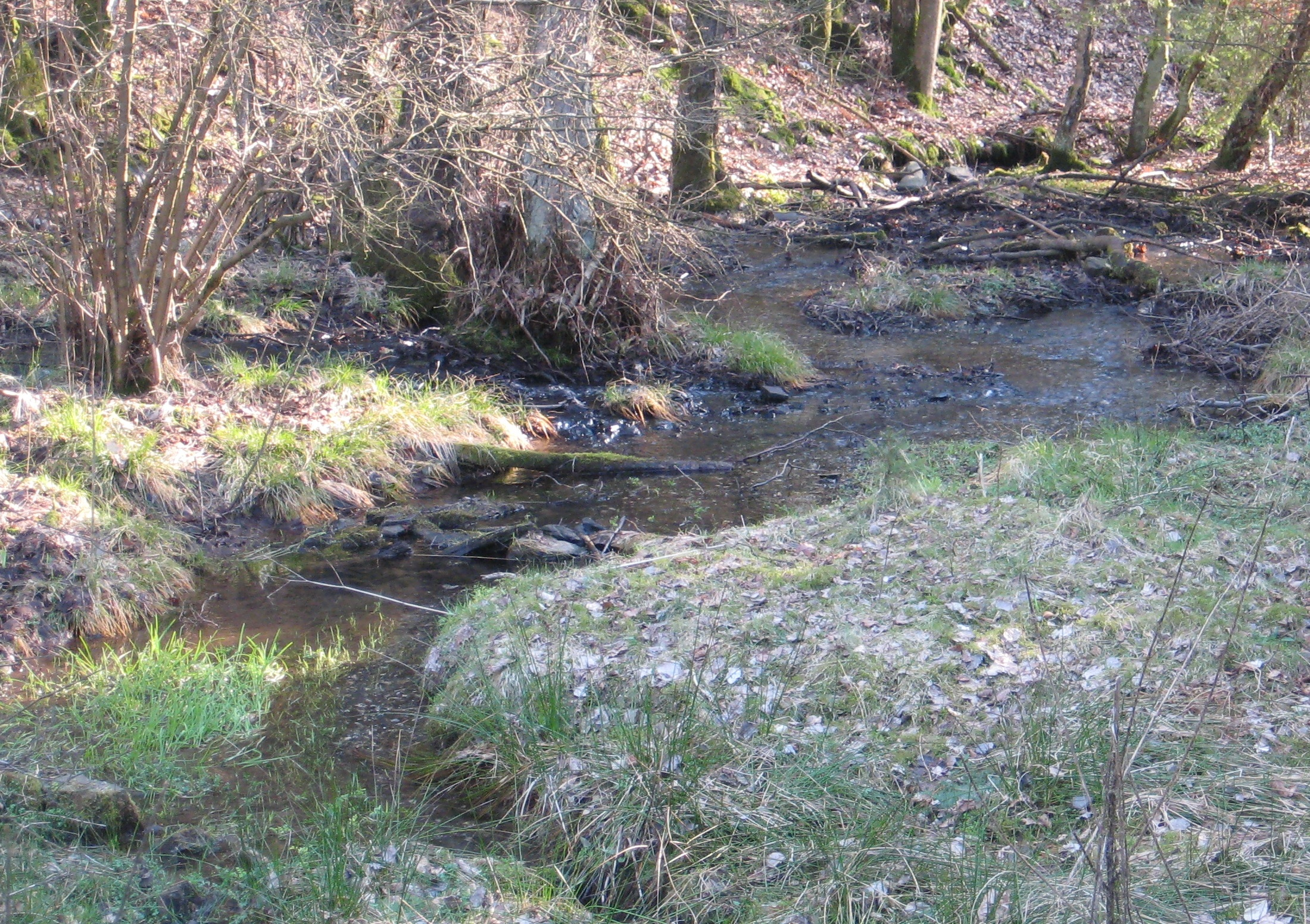

Location
- Country: Germany
- State: North Rhine-Westphalia

Physical characteristics
- Source
  - coordinates: 50.8121°N 8.0433°E
- Mouth
  - location: into the Wildenbach
  - coordinates: 50.7950°N 8.0263°E

Basin features
- Progression: Wildenbach→ Heller→ Sieg→ Rhine→ North Sea

Gutenbach is a river of North Rhine-Westphalia, Germany. It springs north of Unterwilden, a district of Wilnsdorf. It is a right tributary of the Wildenbach in Salchendorf, a district of Neunkirchen.

== See also ==
- List of rivers of North Rhine-Westphalia
