= Kleiner Wildenbach =

River in Germany

Location
- Country: Germany
- State: North Rhine-Westphalia

Physical characteristics
- Source
  - elevation: 409 m (1,342 ft)
- Mouth
  - location: Wildenbach
  - coordinates: 50.8072°N 8.0820°E
  - elevation: 330 m (1,080 ft)
- Length: 1.9 km (1.2 mi)

Basin features
- Progression: Wildenbach→ Heller→ Sieg→ Rhine→ North Sea

Kleiner Wildenbach is a small river of North Rhine-Westphalia, Germany. It flows into the Wildenbach in Wilnsdorf-Wilden.

== See also ==
- List of rivers of North Rhine-Westphalia
