= Wiebelhäuser Bach =

River in Germany

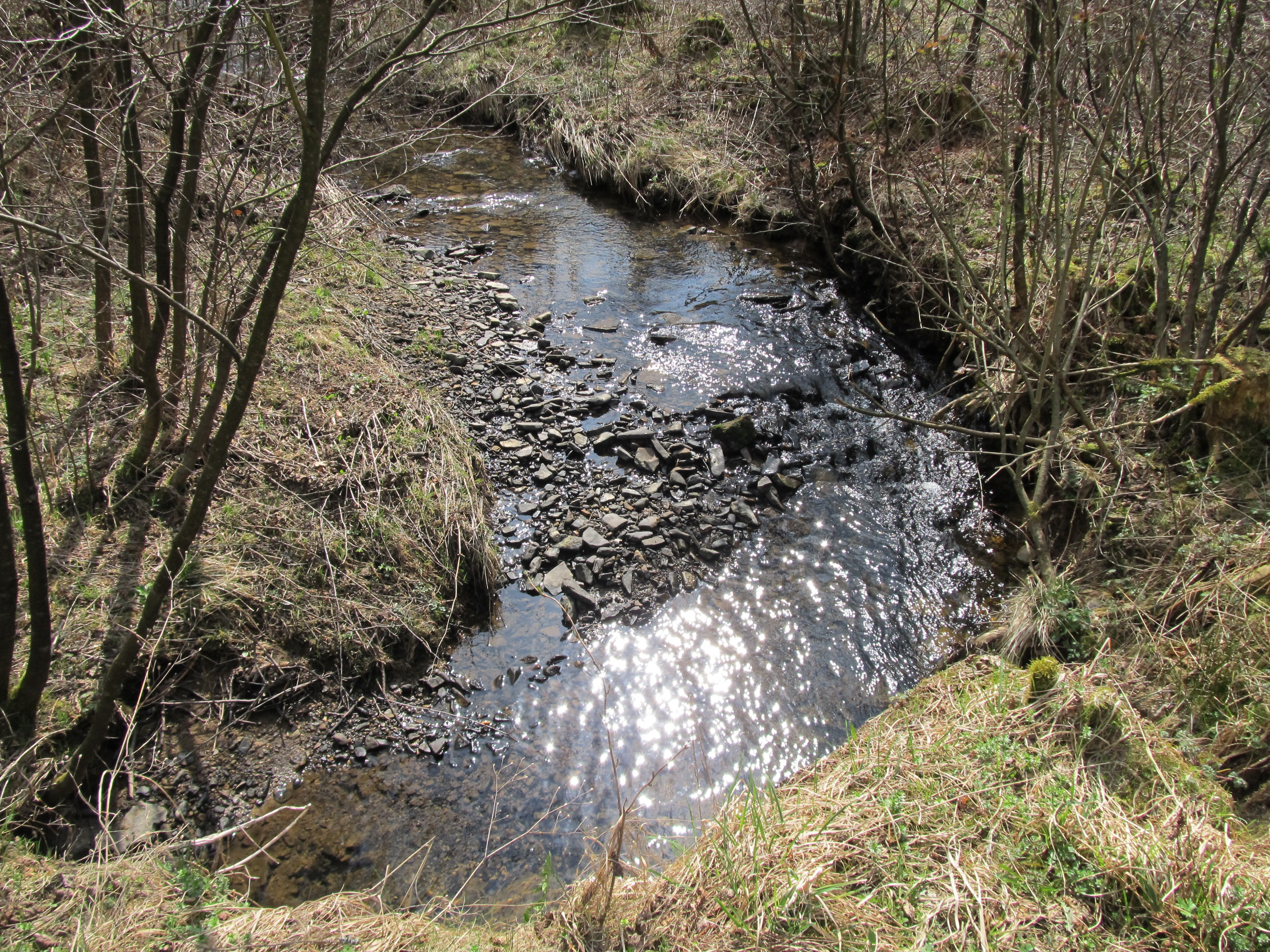

Location
- Country: Germany
- State: North Rhine-Westphalia

Physical characteristics
- Mouth
  - location: Wildenbach
  - coordinates: 50.7909°N 8.1050°E

Basin features
- Progression: Wildenbach→ Heller→ Sieg→ Rhine→ North Sea

Wiebelhäuser Bach is a small river of North Rhine-Westphalia, Germany. It is 3.9 km (2.4 mi) long and is a left tributary of the Wildenbach near Wilnsdorf.

== See also ==
- List of rivers of North Rhine-Westphalia
