= Weiß (Sieg) =

River in Germany

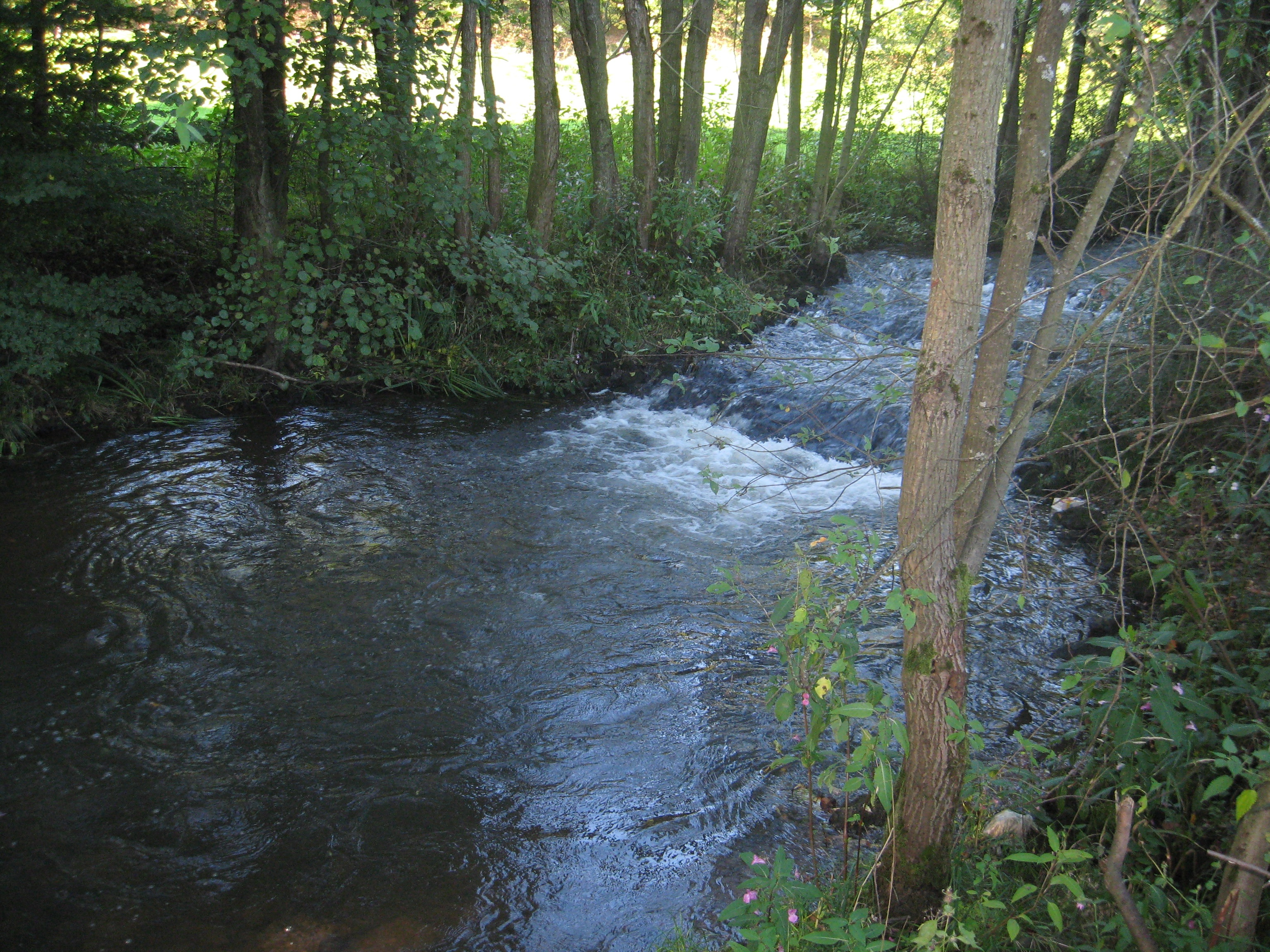

Location
- Country: Germany
- State: North Rhine-Westphalia

Physical characteristics
- Source
  - location: near the mountain Kalteiche
  - elevation: 493 m (1,617 ft)
- Mouth
  - location: Sieg
  - coordinates: 50.8739°N 8.0178°E
  - elevation: 247 m (810 ft)
- Length: 18.1 km (11.2 mi)
- Basin size: 71.463 km^{2} (27.592 sq mi)

Basin features
- Progression: Sieg→ Rhine→ North Sea
- River system: Rhine

The Weiß is a river of North Rhine-Westphalia, Germany, which is 18.1 kilometers (11.2 mi) in length. Its source is near the mountain Kalteiche, at a height of 493 meters (1,617 ft) above sea level. Then it flows through the villages Wilgersdorf, Rudersdorf, Anzhausen, Niederdielfen, Kaan-Marienborn, and the city Siegen. The Weiß flows into the Sieg in Siegen, at 247 meters elevation.

== Geography ==
=== Sources ===
The source of the Weiß, is located within North Rhine-Westphalia, about 220 m north-west of the border with Hesse. It is located in Rothaargebirge at about 493 m above sea level, 1.6 km south of Wilgersdorf, 1.3 km east of the Kalteiche (579.3 m) and about 600 meters north of its eastern neighbor Hirschenstein (562.9 m). About 125 meters to the west of the source the state road L 904 runs from Wilnsdorf to the south. The source of the Weiß emerges from a rock.

=== Course ===
The Weiß runs in predominantly north-westerly direction. The river flows through Wilgersdorf, where it receives its tributary Goldschmiedsborn. After passing the Dill Railway the Weiß receives its largest tributary, the Bichelbach. Then it passes the Anzhäuser mill and reaches the village Anzhausen . After subsequent passing of the commercial area Klabach-Mühlengraben and southern passage of Flammersbach, it runs past Niederdielfen. A little further it flows through the industrial area Weißtal. Then the White reaches the town of Siegen. After a short underground section the river Weiß flows into the Sieg in the lower part of Siegen.

== See also ==
- List of rivers of North Rhine-Westphalia
