= Volkersbach =

River in Germany

Location
- Country: Germany
- State: North Rhine-Westphalia

Physical characteristics
- Mouth
  - location: Heller
  - coordinates: 50.7807°N 8.0396°E

Basin features
- Progression: Heller→ Sieg→ Rhine→ North Sea

Volkersbach is a small river of North Rhine-Westphalia, Germany. It is 3.2 km (2.0 mi) long and flows as a right tributary into the Heller near Neunkirchen.

== See also ==
- List of rivers of North Rhine-Westphalia
