= Arbach (Wildenbach) =

River in North Rhine-Westphalia, Germany

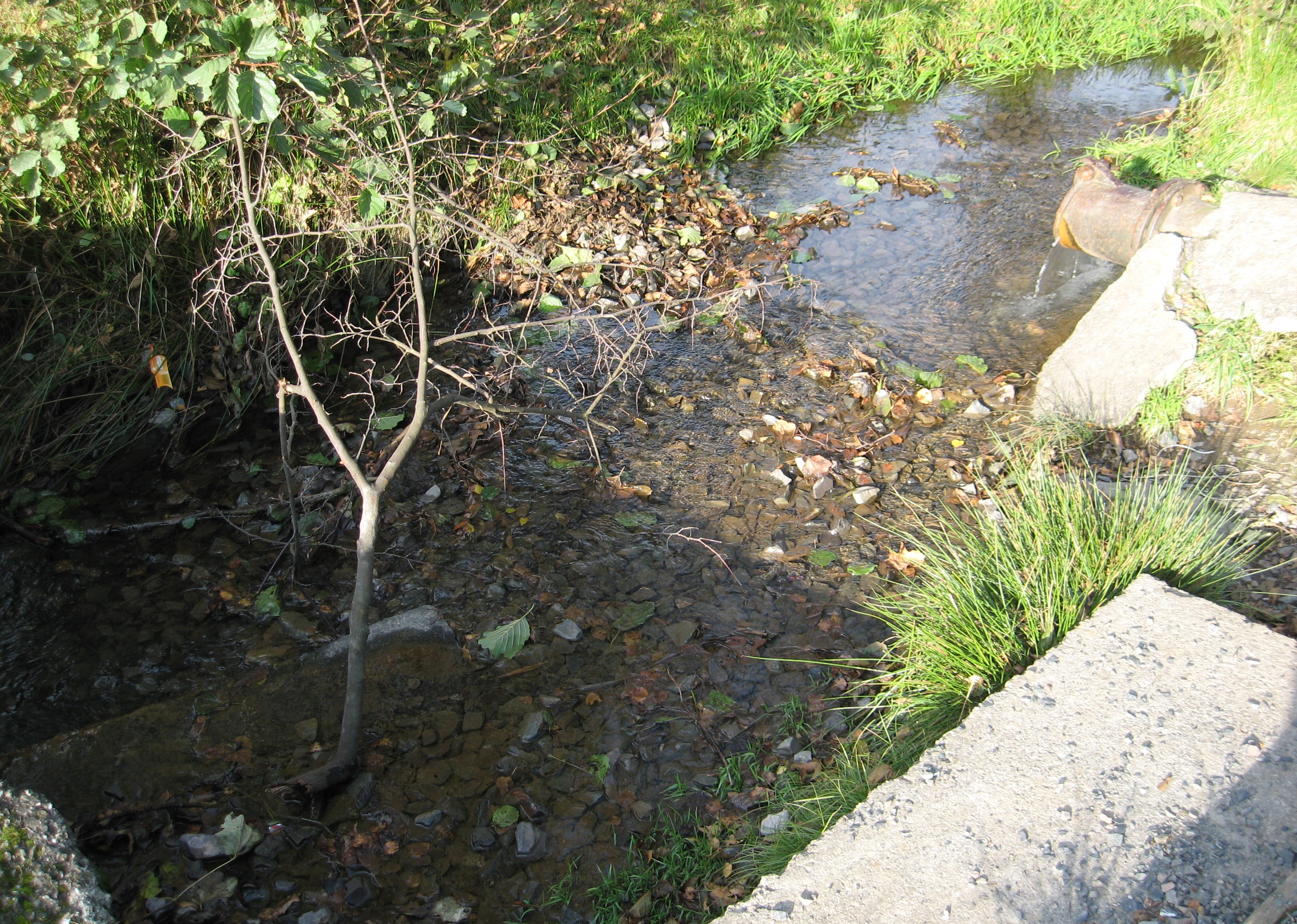

Location
- Country: Germany
- State: North Rhine-Westphalia

Physical characteristics
- Mouth
  - location: Wildenbach
  - coordinates: 50.7933°N 8.0157°E
- Length: 3.774 km (2.345 mi)

Basin features
- Progression: Wildenbach→ Heller→ Sieg→ Rhine→ North Sea

Arbach is a river of North Rhine-Westphalia, Germany. It is a right tributary of the Wildenbach.

== See also ==
- List of rivers of North Rhine-Westphalia
