= Krah (surname) =

Krah is a German surname. Notable people with the surname include:

- the Krah family of entrepreneurs
- Maximilian Krah (born 1977), German lawyer and politician

== See also ==
- Mareen Kräh (born 1984), German judoka
