= Bachseifen =

River of North Rhine-Westphalia, Germany

Location
- Country: Germany
- State: North Rhine-Westphalia

Physical characteristics
- Mouth
  - location: Heller
  - coordinates: 50°45′27″N 8°06′57″E

Basin features
- Progression: Heller→ Sieg→ Rhine→ North Sea

Bachseifen is a small river of North Rhine-Westphalia, Germany. It flows into the Heller near Burbach.

== See also ==
- List of rivers of North Rhine-Westphalia
