= Herdorf =

- Town
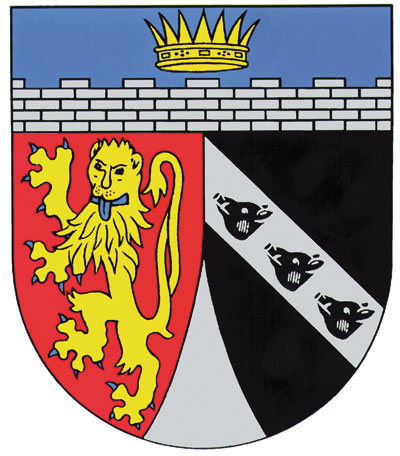
- Coat of arms

- Location of Herdorf within Altenkirchen district
- Interactive map of Herdorf
- Location within Germany Location within Rhineland-Palatinate
- Coordinates: 50°46′39″N 7°57′17″E
- Country: Germany
- State: Rhineland-Palatinate
- District: Altenkirchen
- Municipal assoc.: Daaden-Herdorf
- Subdivisions: 3 Ortsteile

Government
  - Mayor (2019–24): Uwe Erner

Area
  - Total: 17.99 km^{2} (6.95 sq mi)
- Elevation: 290 m (950 ft)

Population (2025-12-31)
  - Total: 6,522
  - Density: 362.5/km^{2} (939.0/sq mi)
- Time zone: UTC+01:00 (CET)
  - Summer (DST): UTC+02:00 (CEST)
- Postal codes: 57562
- Dialling codes: 02744
- Vehicle registration: AK
- Website: www.herdorf.de

Herdorf (German pronunciation: [ˈhɛʁdɔʁf]) is a town in the district of Altenkirchen, in Rhineland-Palatinate, Germany. It is situated on the river Heller, approx. 20 km south-west of Siegen.

== Transport ==
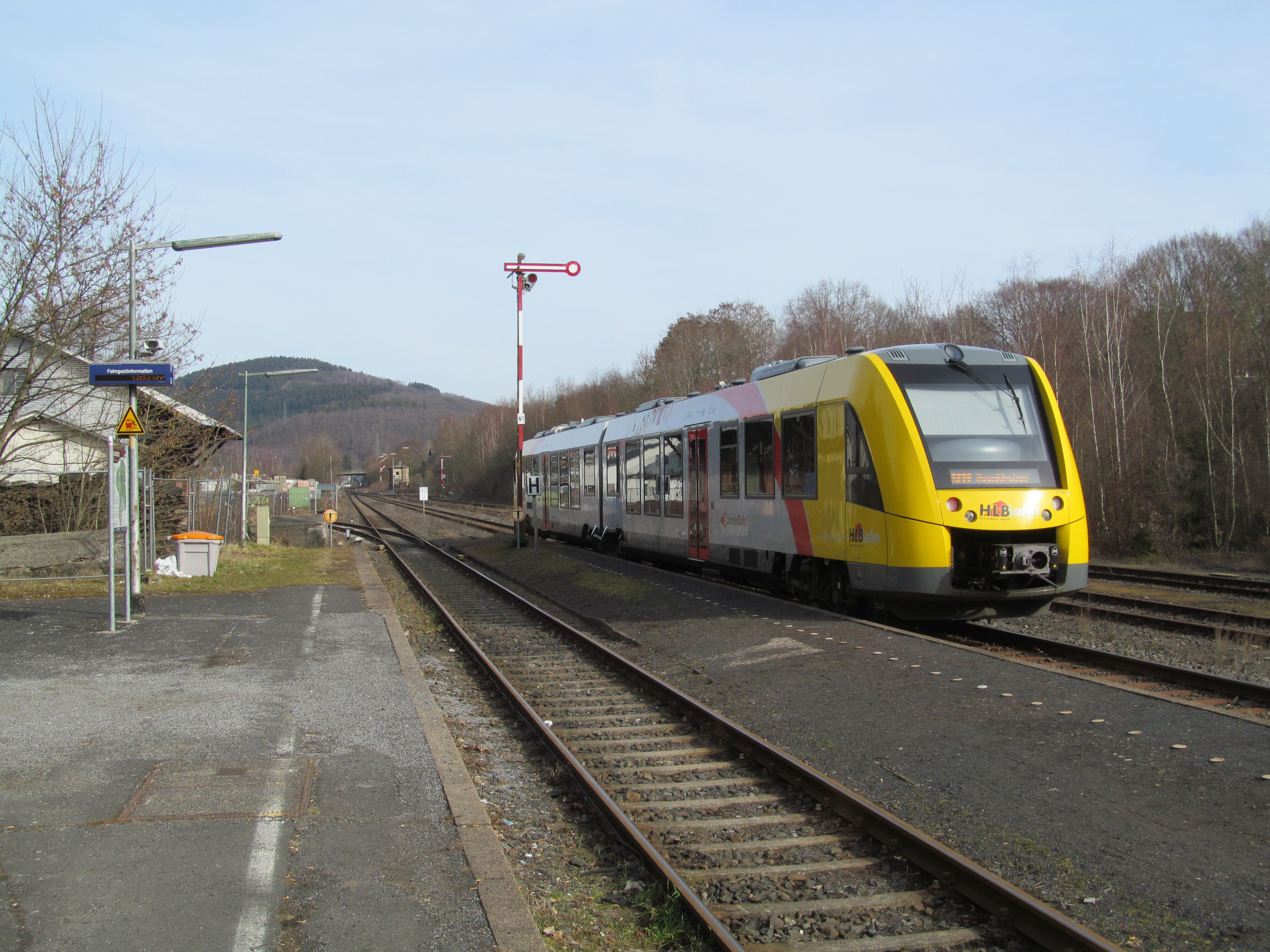
Herdorf train station

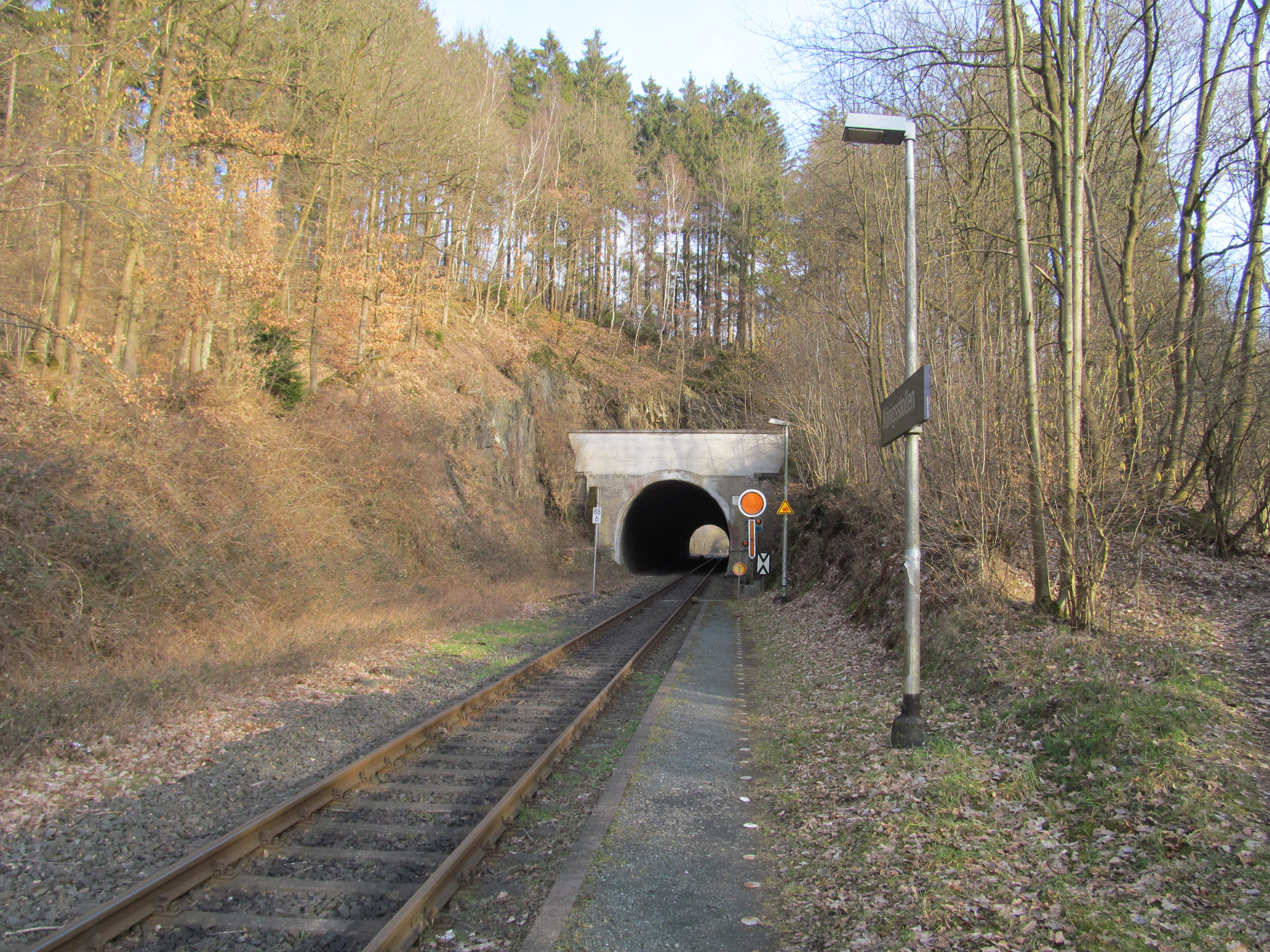
Königsstollen stop at RB96 line

The Herdorf station and the Sassenroth stop and the Königsstollen stop are located on the Betzdorf–Haiger railway (RB96) of DreiLänderBahn, a section of Hessische Landesbahn (HLB).

There also was a service of a branch line from Herdorf via Neunkirchen to Unterwalden which is out of service today.

Herdorf also has access to the public local bus transport through the lines 278, 295, R23 and N73.

The town is located in the area of the transport association Verkehrsverbund Rhein-Mosel (VRM), in the fare zone number 931.

== Twin towns — sister cities ==
Herdorf is twinned with:

- Saint-Laurent-du-Pont, France (1982)
