= Stegskopf =

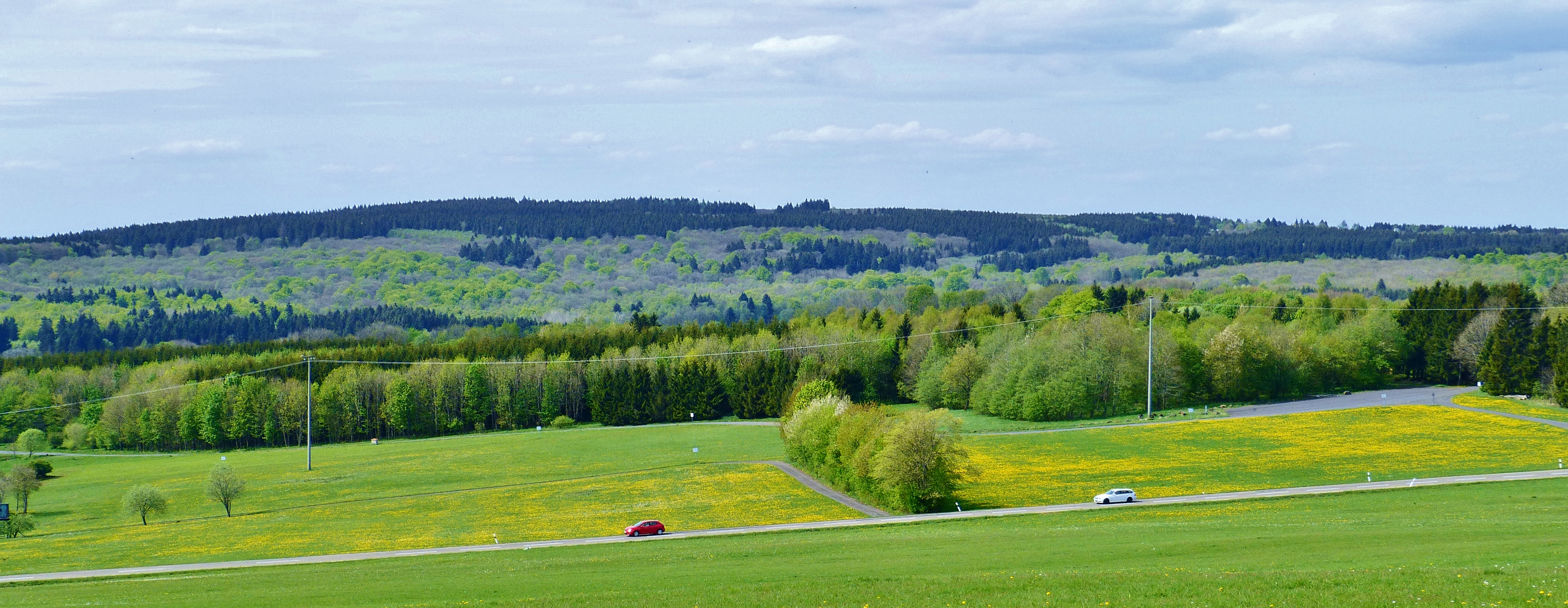
- View from the Galgenberg over the K 34 (Stein–Hof) looking NNW to the southern side of the Stegskopf

Highest point
- Elevation: 654.4 m above sea level (NHN) (2,147 ft)
- Listing: Second highest mountain in the Westerwald
- Coordinates: 50°42′6.2″N 8°1′26.6″E

Geography
- Location within Rhineland-Palatinate
- Location: Near Emmerzhausen; Altenkirchen, Rhineland-Palatinate (Germany)
- Parent range: Westerwald

Geology
- Mountain type: Extinct volcano
- Rock type: Basalt

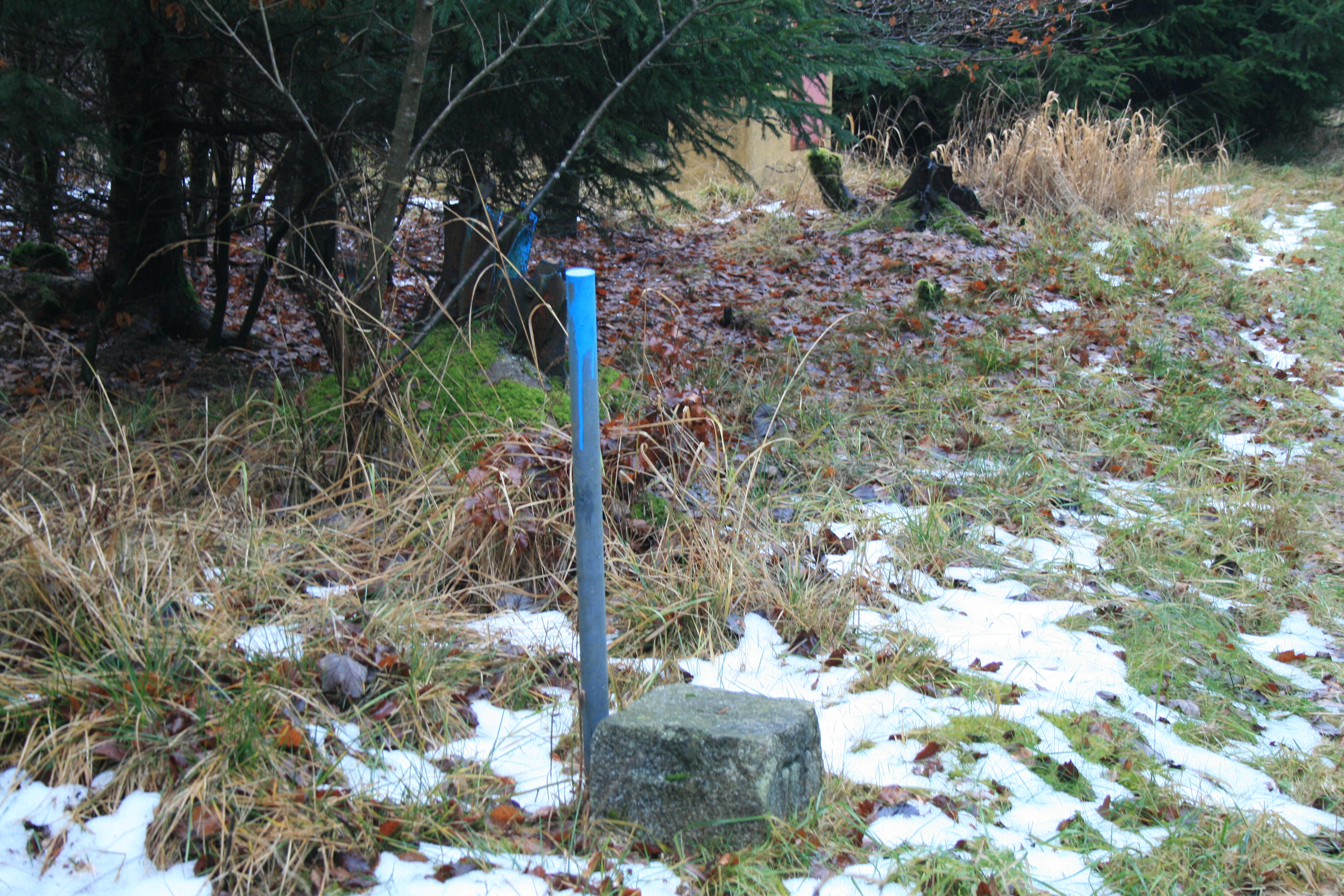
Trigonometric point on the summit of the Stegskopf

The Stegskopf, at 654.4 m above sea level (NHN), is the second highest mountain in the Westerwald range in Germany after the Fuchskaute. It is an extinct volcano in the municipality of Emmerzhausen in the county of Altenkirchen in the state of Rhineland-Palatinate.

== Geography ==
=== Location ===
The Stegskopf is part of the High Westerwald (the highest region in the Westerwald) in the eastern part of the county of Altenkirchen about 2 km south of Emmerzhausen and immediately west-northwest of the village of Stegskopf. To the northwest the land descends via the Kleines Steinchen (587.3 m) to Derschen. Just over 1 km east of the Stegskopf runs a section of the border with the state of North Rhine-Westphalia, in within which is the village of Lippe, part of Burbach, to the northeast. To the southeast the terrain descends to Stein-Neukirch.

On the Stegskopf, where there are several abandoned quartzite and basalt quarries, is thick pine forest.

== Daaden Training Area ==
The Stegskopf was well known for Daaden Training Area (Lager Stegskopf), a military training area first mentioned in 1914 and taken over by the Bundeswehr in 1958, which formed a military area south of Derschen and Emmerzhausen; the mountain being on its northern edge. In the first quarter of 2015, Lager Stegskopf was closed by the Bundeswehr in the wake of their 'new orientation'. The radar units, Prinz Eugen - Tegetthoff (1943–1945), called themselves the Stegskopfer, because they went to Lager Stegskopf for special training in Radio-frequency engineering. To these units belonged several well known telecommunications engineers and physicists, for example, Alfred Fettweis, Wolf Häfele, Herbert Daniel and Walter Mayer.
