= Schutzbach =

- Municipality
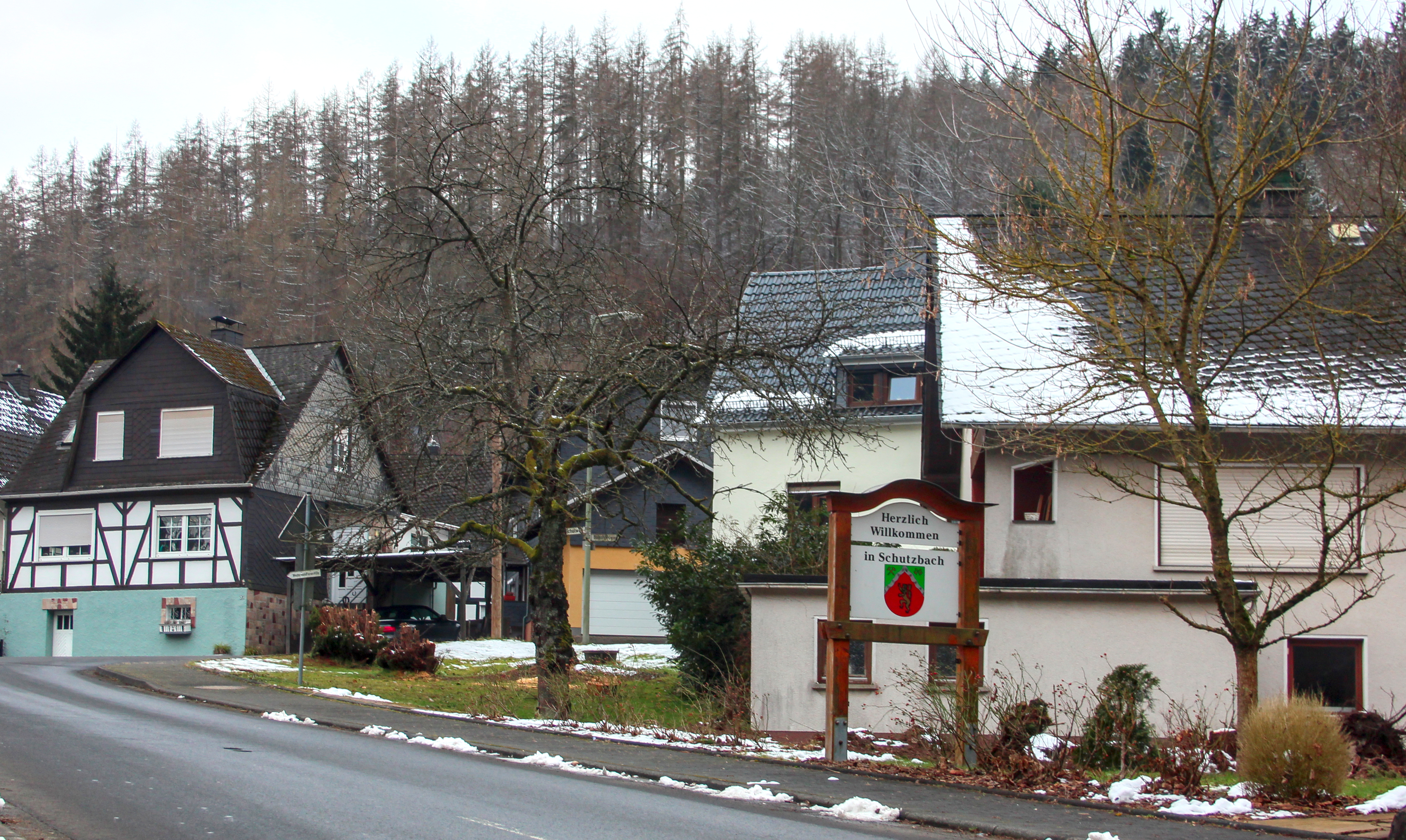

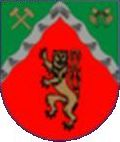
- Coat of arms

- Location of Schutzbach within Altenkirchen (Westerwald) district
- Interactive map of Schutzbach
- Location within Germany Location within Rhineland-Palatinate
- Coordinates: 50°45′24″N 7°54′11″E
- Country: Germany
- State: Rhineland-Palatinate
- District: Altenkirchen (Westerwald)
- Municipal assoc.: Daaden-Herdorf

Government
  - Mayor (2019–24): Detlef Faikus

Area
  - Total: 1.26 km^{2} (0.49 sq mi)
- Elevation: 260 m (850 ft)

Population (2025-12-31)
  - Total: 358
  - Density: 284/km^{2} (736/sq mi)
- Time zone: UTC+01:00 (CET)
  - Summer (DST): UTC+02:00 (CEST)
- Postal codes: 57520
- Dialling codes: 02741
- Vehicle registration: AK
- Website: www.daaden.de

Schutzbach is a municipality in the district of Altenkirchen, in Rhineland-Palatinate, in western Germany. It is home to the pipe manufacturer Krah AG.

== Transport ==
The town is located on the line RB97 (Betzdorf - Daaden railway) as well as the local bus lines 274 and N73 and located in the area of the transport association Verkehrsverbund Rhein-Mosel (VRM), fare zone number 903.
