= Mauden =

- Municipality
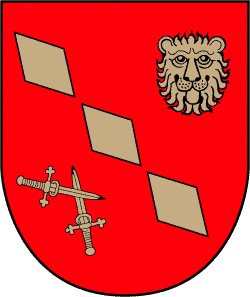
- Coat of arms

- Location of Mauden within Altenkirchen district
- Interactive map of Mauden
- Location within Germany Location within Rhineland-Palatinate
- Coordinates: 50°43′04″N 8°0′11″E
- Country: Germany
- State: Rhineland-Palatinate
- District: Altenkirchen
- Municipal assoc.: Daaden-Herdorf

Government
  - Mayor (2019–24): Achim Reeh

Area
  - Total: 1.74 km^{2} (0.67 sq mi)
- Elevation: 400 m (1,300 ft)

Population (2025-12-31)
  - Total: 125
  - Density: 71.8/km^{2} (186/sq mi)
- Time zone: UTC+01:00 (CET)
  - Summer (DST): UTC+02:00 (CEST)
- Postal codes: 57520
- Dialling codes: 02743
- Vehicle registration: AK
- Website: www.mauden.org

Mauden is a municipality in the district of Altenkirchen, in Rhineland-Palatinate, in western Germany.

== Transport ==
In Mauden was a stop of the trains of the Westerwald railway, but it is currently out of service.
