= Kalteiche =

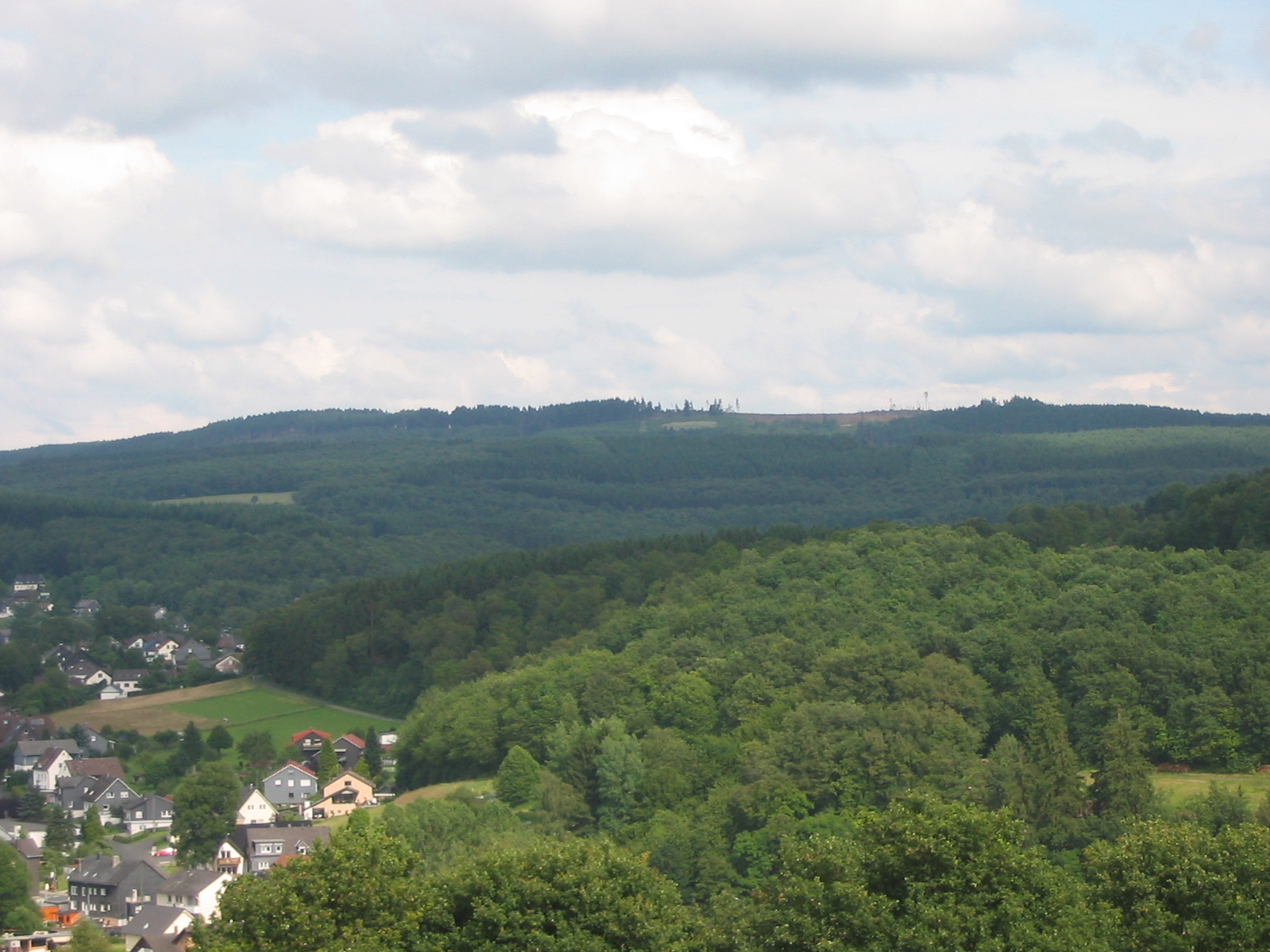
- The Kalteiche seen from Wilden (Jun 2007); clearly visible is the windthrow after Hurricane Kyrill (Jan 07)

Highest point
- Elevation: 579.9 m above sea level (NHN) (1,903 ft)
- Coordinates: 50°48′00″N 8°08′09″E

Geography
- Location within North Rhine-Westphalia
- Location: near Wilgersdorf; Kreis Siegen-Wittgenstein, Nordrhein-Westfalen (Deutschland)
- Parent range: Rothaar

The Kalteiche near Wilgersdorf is a hill, 579.9 m above sea level (NHN), in the German state of North Rhine-Westphalia. It lies within the county of Siegen-Wittgenstein and is one of the higher summits in the Rothaar Mountains and the highest point in the municipality of Wilnsdorf.
