= Daaden-Herdorf =

- Verbandsgemeinde
- Coat of arms

- Location of Daaden-Herdorf within Landkreis Altenkirchen district
- Interactive map of Daaden-Herdorf
- Location within Germany Location within Rhineland-Palatinate
- Coordinates: 50°44′24″N 7°57′54″E
- Country: Germany
- State: Rhineland-Palatinate
- District: Landkreis Altenkirchen
- Subdivisions: 10 Gemeinden

Government
  - Mayor (2022–30): Helmut Stühn

Area
  - Total: 79.03 km^{2} (30.51 sq mi)

Population (2025-12-31)
  - Total: 17,546
  - Density: 222.0/km^{2} (575.0/sq mi)
- Time zone: UTC+01:00 (CET)
  - Summer (DST): UTC+02:00 (CEST)
- Vehicle registration: AK
- Website: www.daaden.de

Daaden-Herdorf (before January 2017: Herdorf-Daaden ) is a Verbandsgemeinde ("collective municipality") in the district of Altenkirchen, in Rhineland-Palatinate, Germany. It was formed on 1 July 2014, when the town Herdorf joined the former Verbandsgemeinde Daaden. The seat of the Verbandsgemeinde is in Daaden.

The Verbandsgemeinde Daaden-Herdorf consists of the following 10 Ortsgemeinden ("local municipalities"):

Municipality	Area (km²)	Population
Daaden *	19.56	4257
Derschen	7.10	1020
Emmerzhausen	7.07	636
Friedewald	7.10	1073
Herdorf	18.01	6522
Mauden	1.74	125
Niederdreisbach	4.16	868
Nisterberg	4.54	374
Schutzbach	1.26	358
Weitefeld	8.49	2313
Verbandsgemeinde Daaden-Herdorf	79.03	17546

^{*} seat of the Verbandsgemeinde
