= Nisterberg =

- Municipality
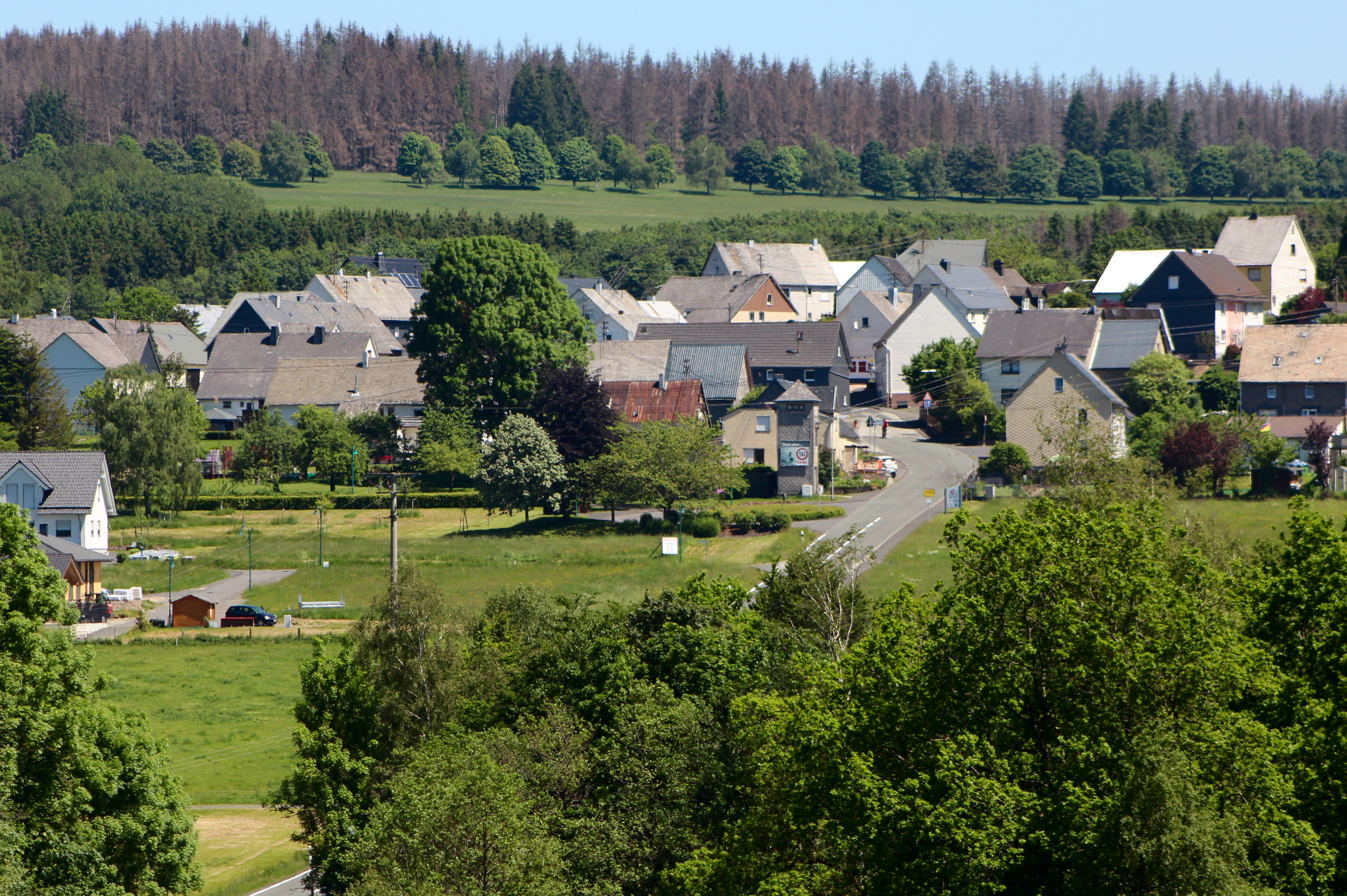

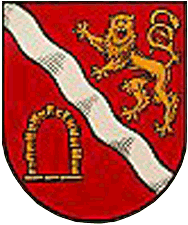
- Coat of arms

- Location of Nisterberg within Altenkirchen district
- Interactive map of Nisterberg
- Location within Germany Location within Rhineland-Palatinate
- Coordinates: 50°40′57″N 7°58′42″E
- Country: Germany
- State: Rhineland-Palatinate
- District: Altenkirchen
- Municipal assoc.: Daaden-Herdorf

Government
  - Mayor (2019–24): Kirstin Höfer

Area
  - Total: 4.54 km^{2} (1.75 sq mi)
- Elevation: 520 m (1,710 ft)

Population (2025-12-31)
  - Total: 374
  - Density: 82.4/km^{2} (213/sq mi)
- Time zone: UTC+01:00 (CET)
  - Summer (DST): UTC+02:00 (CEST)
- Postal codes: 56472
- Dialling codes: 02661
- Vehicle registration: AK
- Website: www.daaden.de

== Transport ==
The village is connected to the public transport through the local bus lines 277, 455, 483 and 960, it is located on the area of the transport association Verkehrsverbund Rhein-Mosel (VRM).

Nisterberg is a municipality in the district of Altenkirchen, in Rhineland-Palatinate, in western Germany.
