= Derschen =

- Municipality
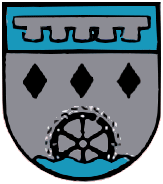
- Coat of arms

- Location of Derschen within Altenkirchen district
- Interactive map of Derschen
- Location within Germany Location within Rhineland-Palatinate
- Coordinates: 50°42′46″N 7°59′6″E
- Country: Germany
- State: Rhineland-Palatinate
- District: Altenkirchen
- Municipal assoc.: Daaden-Herdorf

Government
  - Mayor (2019–24): Volker Wisser

Area
  - Total: 7.10 km^{2} (2.74 sq mi)
- Elevation: 400 m (1,300 ft)

Population (2025-12-31)
  - Total: 1,020
  - Density: 144/km^{2} (372/sq mi)
- Time zone: UTC+01:00 (CET)
  - Summer (DST): UTC+02:00 (CEST)
- Postal codes: 57520
- Dialling codes: 02743
- Vehicle registration: AK
- Website: www.daaden.de

Derschen is a municipality in the district of Altenkirchen, in Rhineland-Palatinate, Germany.

Its highest point is at 400 meters above sea level.

== Transport ==
Derschen was connected to the Westerwald railway, which is currently out of service.
