= Niederdreisbach =

- Municipality
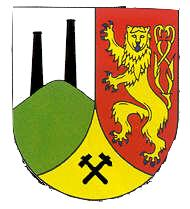
- Coat of arms

- Location of Niederdreisbach within Altenkirchen district
- Interactive map of Niederdreisbach
- Location within Germany Location within Rhineland-Palatinate
- Coordinates: 50°44′55″N 7°55′33″E
- Country: Germany
- State: Rhineland-Palatinate
- District: Altenkirchen
- Municipal assoc.: Daaden-Herdorf

Government
  - Mayor (2019–24): Udo Bender

Area
  - Total: 4.16 km^{2} (1.61 sq mi)
- Elevation: 296 m (971 ft)

Population (2025-12-31)
  - Total: 868
  - Density: 209/km^{2} (540/sq mi)
- Time zone: UTC+01:00 (CET)
  - Summer (DST): UTC+02:00 (CEST)
- Postal codes: 57520
- Dialling codes: 02743
- Vehicle registration: AK
- Website: www.daaden.de

Niederdreisbach is a municipality in the district of Altenkirchen, in Rhineland-Palatinate, in western Germany.

== Transport ==
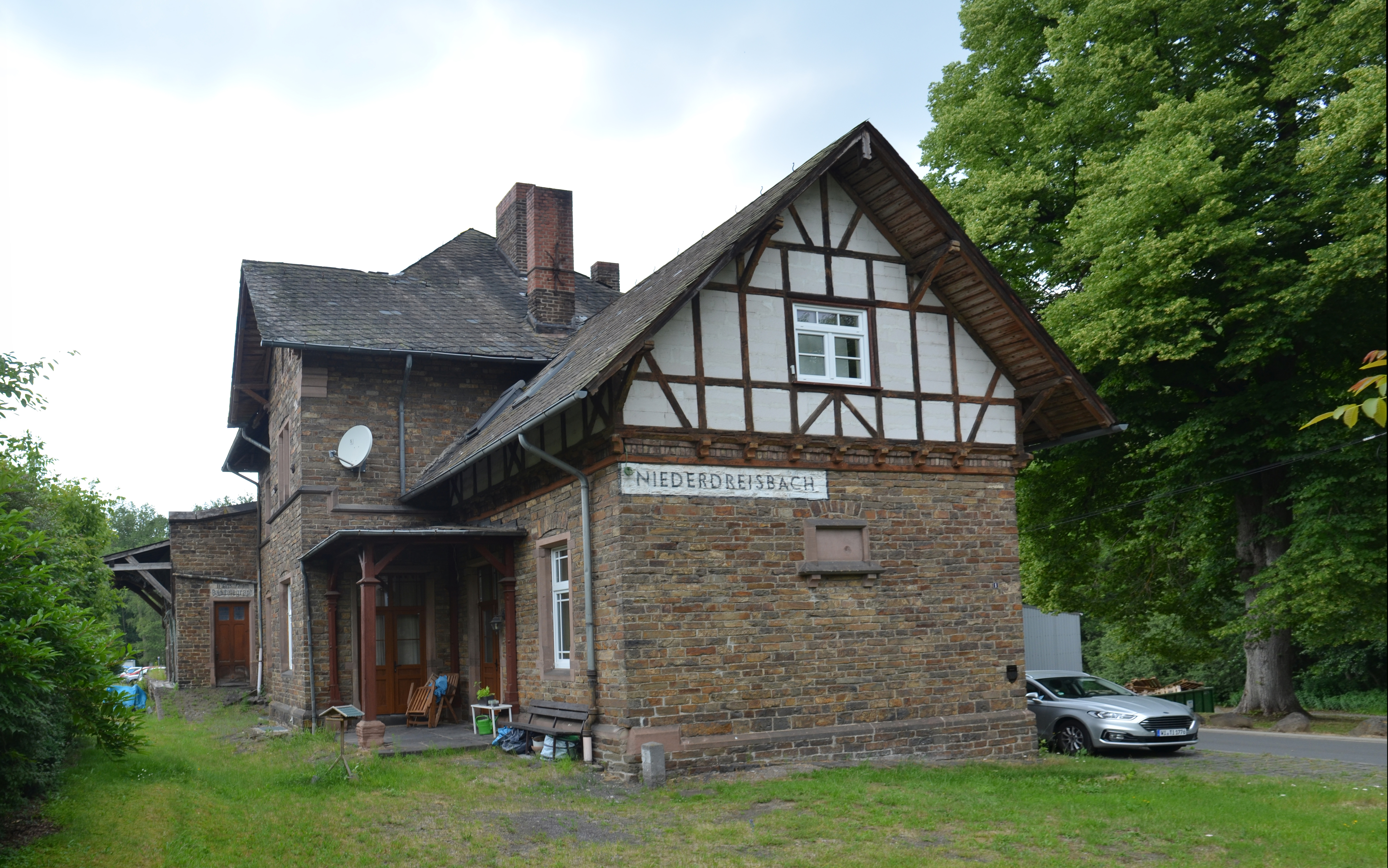
Niederdreisbach train station

Niederdreisbach has a train station at Daade valley railway (RB97) which goes from Betzdorf to Daaden as well as access to the public local bus lines 274 and N73. The village is located in the fare zone number 925 of the transport association Verkehrsverbund Rhein-Mosel (VRM).
