= Neunkirchen (Siegerland) =

- Municipality
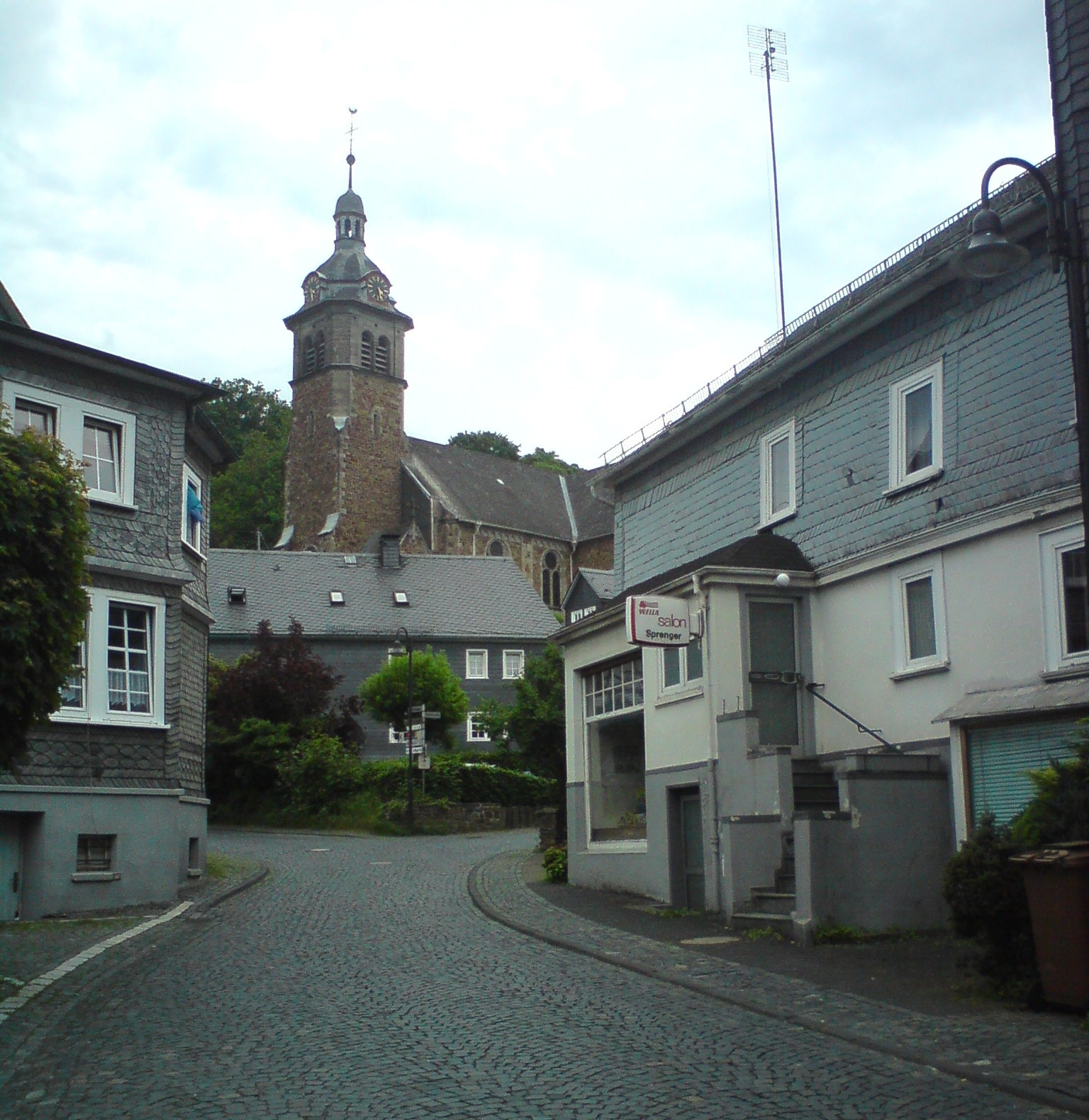

- Coat of arms

- Location of Neunkirchen within Siegen-Wittgenstein district
- Interactive map of Neunkirchen
- Location within Germany Location within North Rhine-Westphalia
- Coordinates: 50°47′59″N 08°00′00″E
- Country: Germany
- State: North Rhine-Westphalia
- Admin. region: Arnsberg
- District: Siegen-Wittgenstein
- Subdivisions: 6

Government
  - Mayor (2020–25): Bernhard Baumann

Area
  - Total: 39.81 km^{2} (15.37 sq mi)
- Elevation: 242–510 m (794–1,673 ft)

Population (2025-12-31)
  - Total: 12,628
  - Density: 317.2/km^{2} (821.6/sq mi)
- Time zone: UTC+01:00 (CET)
  - Summer (DST): UTC+02:00 (CEST)
- Postal codes: 57290
- Dialling codes: 02735
- Vehicle registration: SI
- Website: www.neunkirchen-siegerland.de

Neunkirchen (German: [ˈnɔʏnkɪʁçn̩]; English: "New Church") is a municipality in the Siegen-Wittgenstein district, in North Rhine-Westphalia, Germany.

== History ==
Neunkirchen had its first documentary mention on 23 August 1288.

== Geography ==
Neunkirchen lies on the river Heller, about 10 km south of Siegen.

=== Neighbouring communities ===
Neunkirchen neighbours the communities of Burbach, Wilnsdorf, Herdorf and Daaden.

=== Constituent communities ===
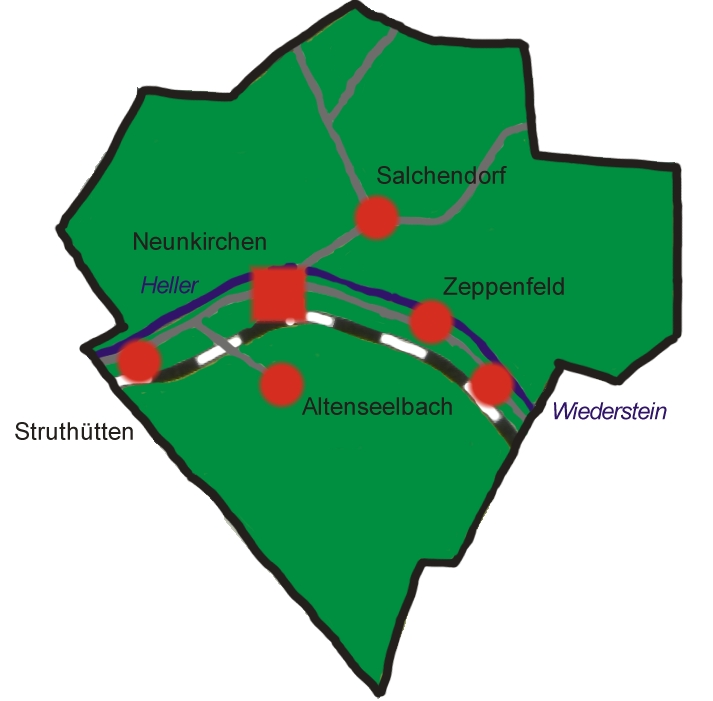
Constituent communities

Neunkirchen consists of the following centres:

- Altenseelbach
- Neunkirchen
- Salchendorf
- Struthütten
- Wiederstein
- Zeppenfeld

Until 1 January 1969, all these places were independent municipalities, before they were all merged to form today's greater community of Neunkirchen.

=== Climate ===
Neunkirchen's climate is classified as oceanic (Köppen: Cfb; Trewartha: Dobk). The average annual temperature in Neunkirchen is 10.0 °C (50.0 °F). The average annual rainfall is 1,006.7 mm (39.63 in) with December as the wettest month. The temperatures are highest on average in July, at around 18.3 °C (64.9 °F), and lowest in January, at around 2.3 °C (36.1 °F).

The Neunkirchen weather station has recorded the following extreme values:

- Highest Temperature 38.4 °C (101.1 °F) on 25 July 2019.
- Warmest Minimum 22.2 °C (72.0 °F) on 2 July 2015.
- Coldest Maximum −11.2 °C (11.8 °F) on 8 January 1985.
- Lowest Temperature −21.6 °C (−6.9 °F) on 18 January 1963.
- Highest Daily Precipitation 68.7 mm (2.70 in) on 14 September 1998.
- Wettest Month 239.1 mm (9.41 in) in December 1965.
- Wettest Year 1,335.4 mm (52.57 in) in 1966.
- Driest Year 666.7 mm (26.25 in) in 1971.
- Earliest Snowfall: 4 November 1966.
- Latest Snowfall: 4 May 1979.
- Longest annual sunshine: 1,909.4 hours in 2018.
- Shortest annual sunshine: 1,418 hours in 2013.

Climate data for Neunkirchen (1991−2020 normals, extremes 1962–present (Note: The data from 1 August 1962 to 29 February 1992 are from the Neunkirchen-Seelscheid-Meisenbach weather station, and the data from 1 September 1992 to the present are from the Neunkirchen-Seelscheid-Krawinkel weather station. There are no meteorological observations for the six months in between.))
Month	Jan	Feb	Mar	Apr	May	Jun	Jul	Aug	Sep	Oct	Nov	Dec	Year
Record high °C (°F)	15.4 (59.7)	20.5 (68.9)	25.3 (77.5)	29.2 (84.6)	32.5 (90.5)	35.0 (95.0)	38.4 (101.1)	36.8 (98.2)	32.3 (90.1)	26.1 (79.0)	20.0 (68.0)	17.2 (63.0)	38.4 (101.1)
Mean maximum °C (°F)	11.8 (53.2)	13.3 (55.9)	18.1 (64.6)	23.5 (74.3)	26.8 (80.2)	30.2 (86.4)	31.5 (88.7)	30.8 (87.4)	25.9 (78.6)	21.0 (69.8)	15.5 (59.9)	12.0 (53.6)	33.3 (91.9)
Mean daily maximum °C (°F)	4.8 (40.6)	6.1 (43.0)	10.2 (50.4)	14.8 (58.6)	18.5 (65.3)	21.5 (70.7)	23.5 (74.3)	23.2 (73.8)	19.1 (66.4)	14.0 (57.2)	8.7 (47.7)	5.4 (41.7)	14.1 (57.4)
Daily mean °C (°F)	2.3 (36.1)	2.8 (37.0)	5.9 (42.6)	9.7 (49.5)	13.4 (56.1)	16.4 (61.5)	18.3 (64.9)	17.7 (63.9)	14.1 (57.4)	10.1 (50.2)	6.0 (42.8)	3.1 (37.6)	10.0 (50.0)
Mean daily minimum °C (°F)	−0.3 (31.5)	−0.3 (31.5)	1.8 (35.2)	4.5 (40.1)	8.0 (46.4)	11.0 (51.8)	13.1 (55.6)	12.6 (54.7)	9.7 (49.5)	6.6 (43.9)	3.2 (37.8)	0.6 (33.1)	5.9 (42.6)
Mean minimum °C (°F)	−8.8 (16.2)	−8.0 (17.6)	−5.3 (22.5)	−2.7 (27.1)	0.8 (33.4)	5.0 (41.0)	7.4 (45.3)	6.8 (44.2)	4.0 (39.2)	0.0 (32.0)	−3.3 (26.1)	−6.7 (19.9)	−11.8 (10.8)
Record low °C (°F)	−21.6 (−6.9)	−18.0 (−0.4)	−12.8 (9.0)	−8.0 (17.6)	−1.6 (29.1)	−0.5 (31.1)	3.0 (37.4)	2.4 (36.3)	−0.4 (31.3)	−5.1 (22.8)	−10.4 (13.3)	−16.4 (2.5)	−21.6 (−6.9)
Average precipitation mm (inches)	93.9 (3.70)	80.8 (3.18)	77.6 (3.06)	56.6 (2.23)	75.3 (2.96)	88.5 (3.48)	87.5 (3.44)	93.9 (3.70)	79.3 (3.12)	83.2 (3.28)	88.3 (3.48)	101.8 (4.01)	1,006.7 (39.63)
Average extreme snow depth cm (inches)	5.7 (2.2)	5.8 (2.3)	2.2 (0.9)	0.1 (0.0)	0 (0)	0 (0)	0 (0)	0 (0)	0 (0)	0 (0)	0.9 (0.4)	3.6 (1.4)	9.2 (3.6)
Average precipitation days (≥ 0.1 mm)	18.7	17.5	16.9	13.2	15.1	15.0	16.2	14.8	14.7	17.0	18.9	20.3	198.2
Average relative humidity (%)	85.1	81.5	76.6	70.2	71.7	73.5	74.0	76.1	80.8	84.4	87.0	87.3	79.0
Mean monthly sunshine hours	50.5	70.6	128.8	185.5	202.2	209.0	215.2	191.0	153.9	104.7	47.3	41.3	1,599.9
Source: DWD Open Data

== Population ==
Historical population

Year	Pop.	±% p.a.
1965	13,084	—
1970	13,973	+1.32%
1975	14,632	+0.93%
1980	14,560	−0.10%
1985	13,861	−0.98%
1990	14,461	+0.85%
1995	14,717	+0.35%

Year	Pop.	±% p.a.
2000	14,501	−0.30%
2005	14,072	−0.60%
2010	13,691	−0.55%
2015	13,717	+0.04%
2020	13,075	−0.95%
2025	12,628	−0.69%

Source: Landesdatabank Nordrhein-Westfalen

== Politics ==
=== Municipal council ===
The council's 28 seats are apportioned thus, in accordance with municipal elections held on 26 September 2004:

	CDU	SPD	Greens	FDP	UWG	total
2004	8	11	1	3	5	28

Note: UWG is a citizens' coalition.

=== Coat of arms ===
Neunkirchen's civic coat of arms might be described thus: Or three lozenges in bend sable.

The greater community's current arms are the same as those formerly borne by Altenseelbach before amalgamation. They were adopted as Neunkirchen's arms in 1969. The charge of the three lozenges comes from the arms borne by the Lords of Seelbach in the Middle Ages. A similar charge – in the same colours – can be seen in nearby Burbach's arms.

=== Partnerships ===
- (Germany) Pausa, Saxony, since 1990
- Gainsborough, United Kingdom, friendship links since 1972; partnership since 1991
- (Germany) Falkensee, Brandenburg

== Economy and infrastructure ==
=== Transport links ===
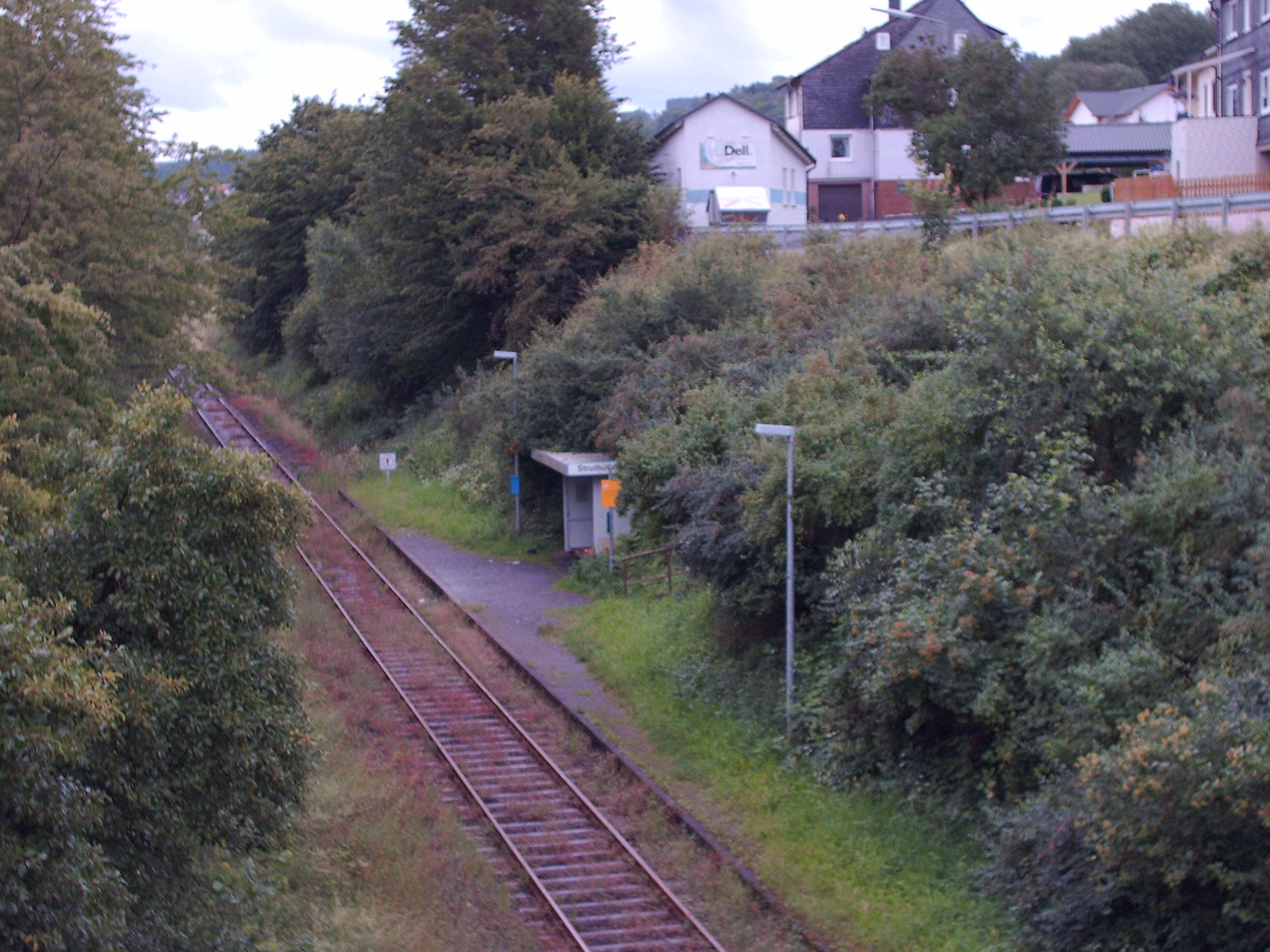
Struthütten stop

Neunkirchen has five stations along the Betzdorf–Haiger railway, which are Struthuetten, Altenseelbach, Neunkirchen (Kr. Siegen), Zeppenfeld and Wiederstein, they are served by the local train line number RB96 of Hessische Landesbahn (HLB), section DreiLänderBahn. Neunkirchen is located in the fare association Westfalen-Tarif, in the zone number 81900. Also local bus lines connect Neunkirchen to the public transport.

=== Established businesses ===
- Heinrich Baumgarten KG – special plant for making handles for the cookware industry
- Baumgarten automotive technics GmbH
- Schäfer Werke
- EMW Eisen- und Metallhandel
- Karl Sauer GmbH
- K. Sauer GmbH - lamps and contents
- F. WEIDT GMBH Logistics Consulting

== Literature ==
Otto Braun: 700 Jahre Neunkirchen. Neunkirchen 1988.
