= Emmerzhausen =

- Municipality
- Coat of arms

- Location of Emmerzhausen within Altenkirchen district
- Interactive map of Emmerzhausen
- Location within Germany Location within Rhineland-Palatinate
- Coordinates: 50°43′14″N 8°1′31″E
- Country: Germany
- State: Rhineland-Palatinate
- District: Altenkirchen
- Municipal assoc.: Daaden-Herdorf

Government
  - Mayor (2020–24): Hans-Joachim Fries

Area
  - Total: 7.07 km^{2} (2.73 sq mi)
- Elevation: 480 m (1,570 ft)

Population (2025-12-31)
  - Total: 636
  - Density: 90.0/km^{2} (233/sq mi)
- Time zone: UTC+01:00 (CET)
  - Summer (DST): UTC+02:00 (CEST)
- Postal codes: 57520
- Dialling codes: 02743
- Vehicle registration: AK
- Website: www.daaden.de

Emmerzhausen is a municipality in the district of Altenkirchen, in Rhineland-Palatinate, Germany.

== Transport ==
Emmerzhausen in the past was served by trains on the Westerwald railway, which is currently out of service.
