= Daaden =

- Town
- Coat of arms

- Location of Daaden within Altenkirchen district
- Interactive map of Daaden
- Location within Germany Location within Rhineland-Palatinate
- Coordinates: 50°44′23″N 7°58′06″E
- Country: Germany
- State: Rhineland-Palatinate
- District: Altenkirchen
- Municipal assoc.: Daaden-Herdorf

Government
  - Mayor (2019–24): Walter Strunk

Area
  - Total: 19.58 km^{2} (7.56 sq mi)
- Elevation: 427 m (1,401 ft)

Population (2025-12-31)
  - Total: 4,257
  - Density: 217.4/km^{2} (563.1/sq mi)
- Time zone: UTC+01:00 (CET)
  - Summer (DST): UTC+02:00 (CEST)
- Postal codes: 57567
- Dialling codes: 02743
- Vehicle registration: AK
- Website: www.daaden.org

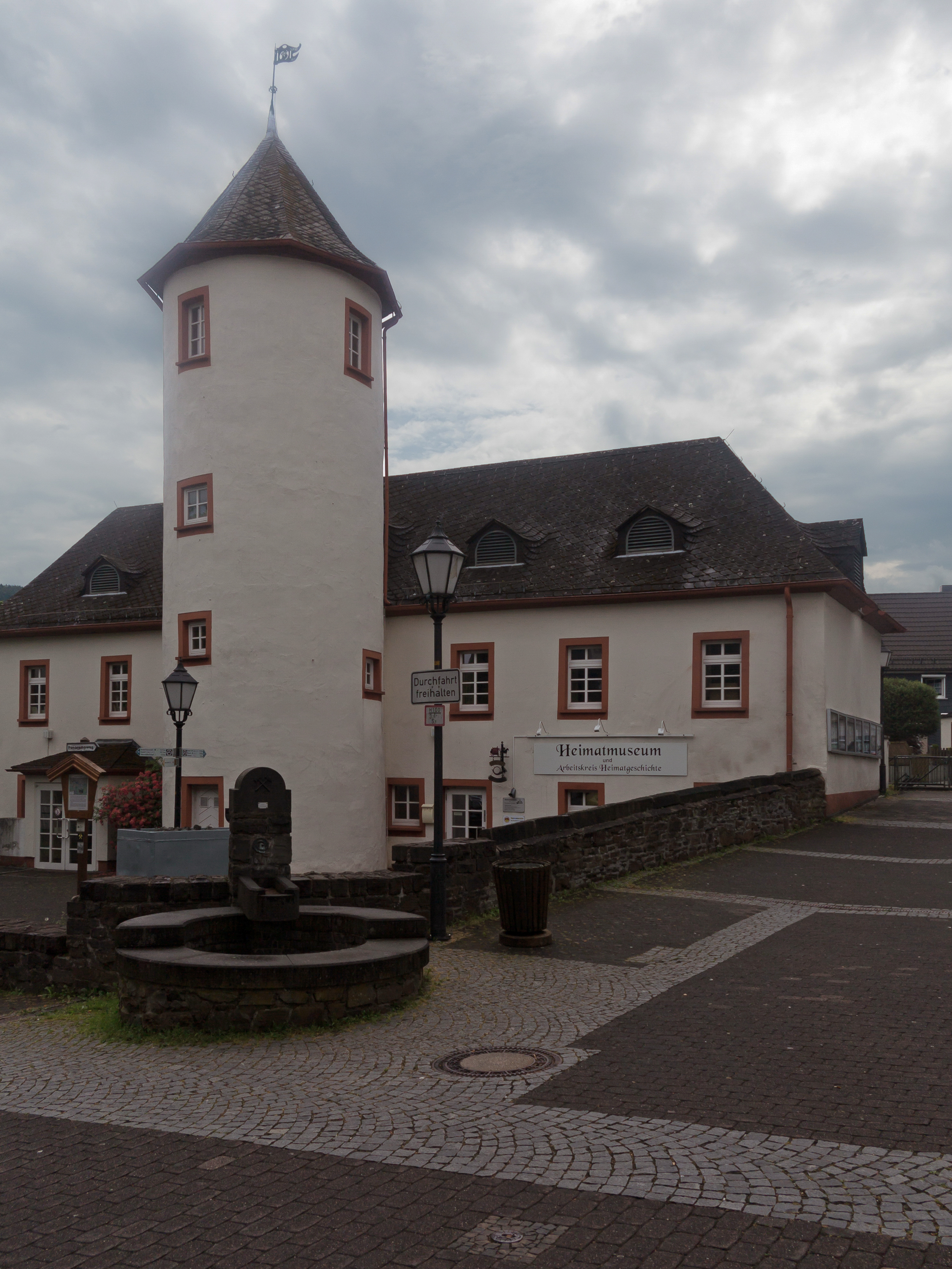
Daaden, the Heimat Museum

Daaden (German pronunciation: [ˈdaːdn̩]) is a town in the district of Altenkirchen, Rhineland-Palatinate, Germany. It is situated in the Westerwald, approx. 15 km south-west of Siegen.

Daaden is the seat of the Verbandsgemeinde ("collective municipality") Daaden-Herdorf.

== Traffic ==
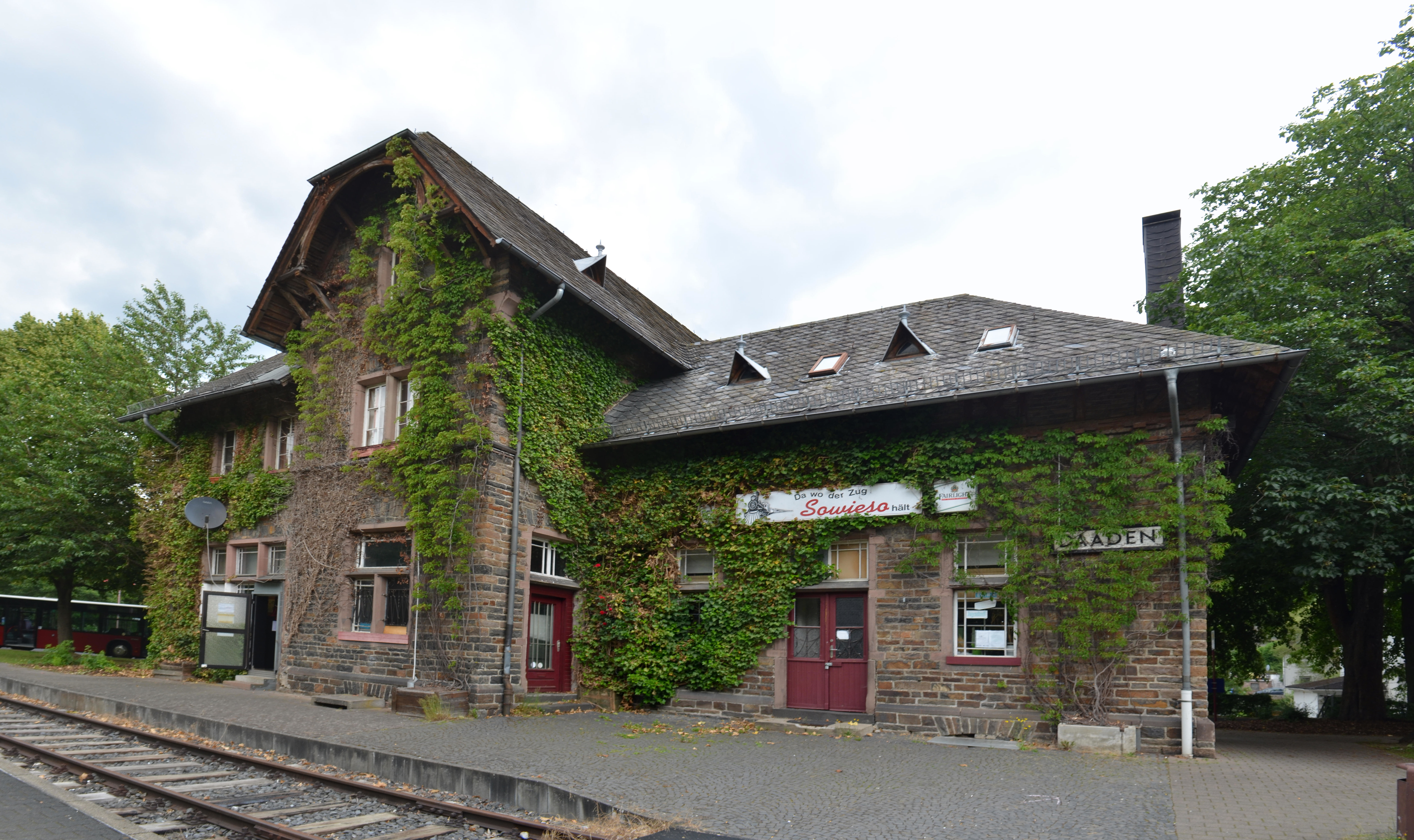
Daaden train station

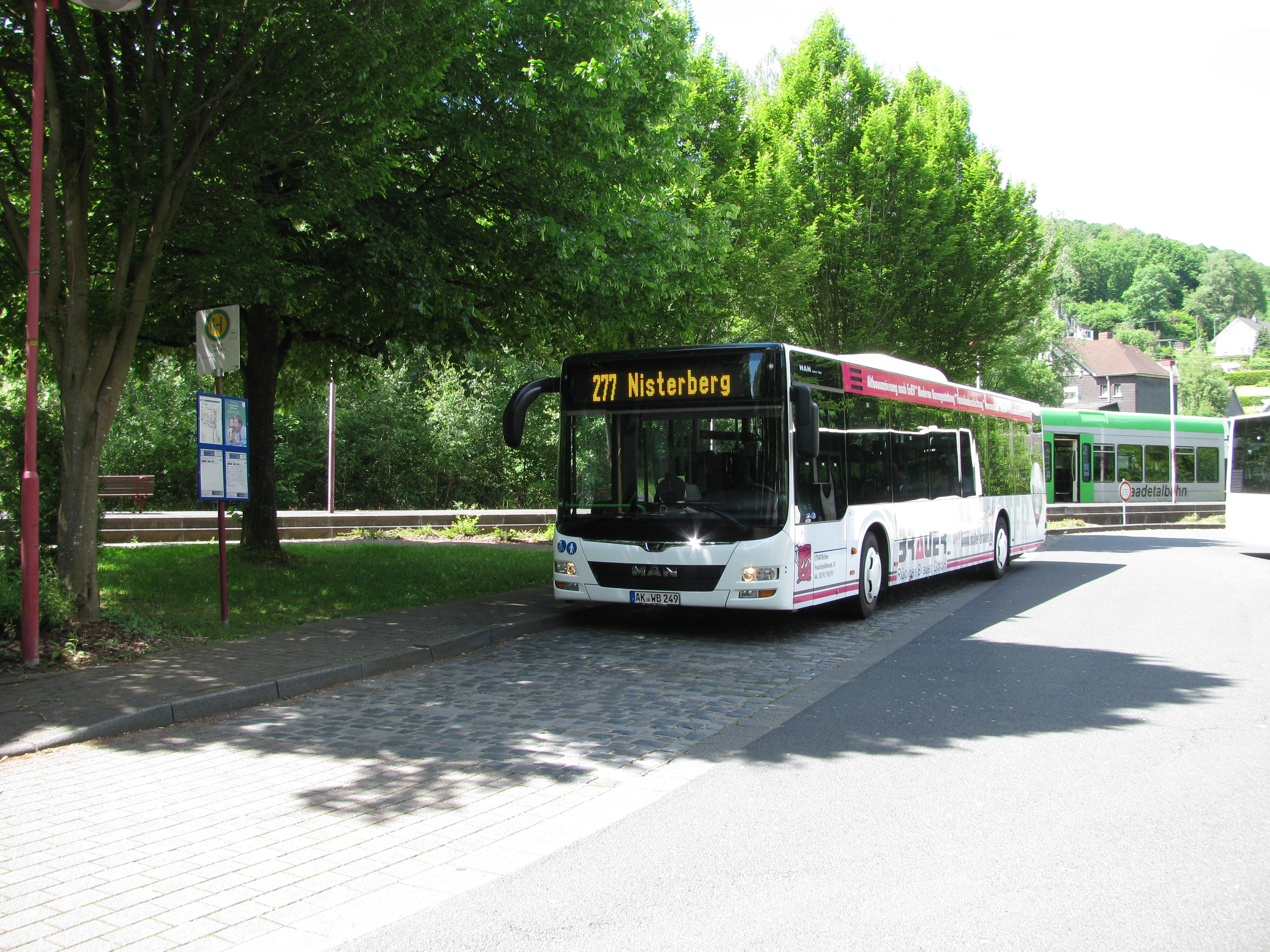
Local bus in Daaden

Daaden is located on the end of the Betzdorf -Daaaden railway line (RB97), which is served by Westerwaldbahn GmbH since 1994 and in the area of the transport association Verkehrsverbund Rhein-Mosel (VRM), in the zone number 930. There's also access to the public local bus lines 265, 276, 277, 455, 295, R23 and N73.
