= Wildenbach =

River in Germany

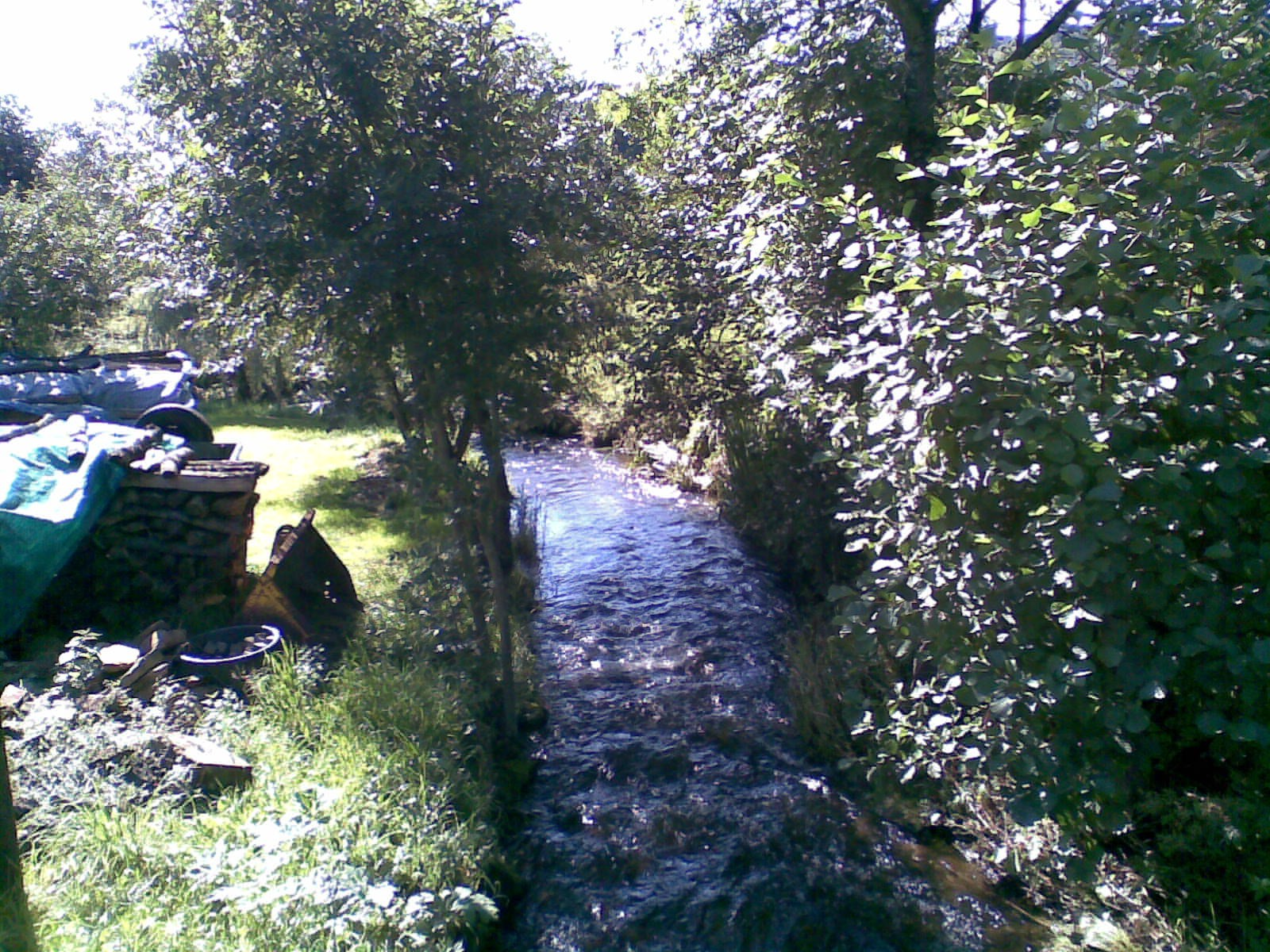

Location
- Country: Germany
- State: North Rhine-Westphalia

Physical characteristics
- Mouth
  - location: Heller
  - coordinates: 50.7874°N 7.9989°E
- Length: 11.7 km (7.3 mi)

Basin features
- Progression: Heller→ Sieg→ Rhine→ North Sea

Wildenbach (also called Wildebach) is a river of North Rhine-Westphalia, Germany. It flows into the Heller in Neunkirchen.

== See also ==
- List of rivers of North Rhine-Westphalia
