= Wilgersdorf =

- Village of Wilnsdorf
- Interactive map of Wilgersdorf
- Location within Germany Location within North Rhine-Westphalia
- Coordinates: 50°48′54″N 08°08′54″E
- Country: Germany
- State: North Rhine-Westphalia
- Admin. region: Arnsberg
- District: Siegen-Wittgenstein
- Municipality: Wilnsdorf

Area
  - Total: 11.54 km^{2} (4.46 sq mi)
- Elevation: 380 m (1,250 ft)

Population
  - Total: 2,977
  - Density: 258.0/km^{2} (668.1/sq mi)
- Time zone: UTC+01:00 (CET)
  - Summer (DST): UTC+02:00 (CEST)
- Postal codes: 57234
- Dialling codes: 02739
- Vehicle registration: SI

Wilgersdorf is a village in the district Siegen-Wittgenstein in North Rhine-Westphalia, Germany.
Apart from that, it is also the biggest part (by area) of the municipality Wilnsdorf.

== Geography ==
Wilgersdorf is located in a rich forestregion in the Rothaargebirge (see Rothaarsteig for the nearby hiking trail). Highest elevations of the area are the Kalteiche (579.3 m | 1900.6 ft) and the Tiefenrother Höhe (552.3 m | 1812 ft). In the southern part of the village arises the Weiss, which joins the river Sieg after 18.1 km (11.2 mi). Wilgersdorf has a total area of 11.54 km² (4.46 sq mi).

== History ==
Wilgersdorf had its first documentary mention in 1377 under the name Vylgirstorff.

In 1491, the villages were completely destroyed by a major fire. In 1563, the plaque killed 10 of the 204 inhabitants, in 1636 45% died of hunger or disease. From 1579 onwards the village belonged to the parish of Haiger, since 1595 to Wilnsdorf. 1716 started with the construction of a Simultaneum in the village. The place fell under the control of John of Nassau in 1621. Wilgersdorf was united to one municipality with Wilnsdorf and Rödgen in 1648 and assigned to the Amt of Wilnsdorf in 1818. Big fires destroyed many houses in 1857 and 1920. Piped water supply was available by 1906 and by 1911 the local mill provided electricity for the village. The fire service was established in 1927. In 1953 a Protestant community house was built. A Catholic church was consecrated in 1957, followed by a Protestant church in the 60's.

In 1963 dwelling and smelting places of the La Tène culture (500 B.C., Iron Age) were found on the territory.

The Amt of Wilnsdorf was disbanded in 1969 and Wilgersdorf was integrated into the new municipality of Wilnsdorf.

=== Mines ===
The mine Neue Hoffnung (transl.: new hope) was operated with 300 workers from 1883 to 1913 with a total depth of 440 m (1443 ft). Zinc-, Lead- and Silverores and also Ironore was mined. Other mines were Neues Jerusalem, Viktoria and Bomkutte.

== Trivia ==
- In the local tongue, the people of Wilgersdorf call themselves 'Wiljerschdorfer' (roughly pronounced 'Will'+'Yeah'+'R'+Shh+'Dwarf'+'R' for an English speaker - rolling the R's is required)
- Like in other place of the district people may greet each other with the term 'Schur', sounding like the English 'sure', meaning 'Hi' or 'Good day'
- From an observation deck on top of the Tiefenrother Höhe hill 50°49′3.96″N 8°10′23.44″E, a regional famous view over the whole nearby uplands is possible (part of the Rothaarsteig hiking trail)

== Literature ==
- Herbert Wiesner: 600 Jahre Wilgersdorf 1377-1977 (transl.: 600 years Wilgersdorf 1377-1977) – Chronicle and Festschrift, author's edition, published by the local associations in 1977
- Kurt Becker: Unsere Väter - die Bergleute der Grube Bautenberg zwischen Gilsbach und Wilden, Dill und Westerwald (transl.: Our fathers: the miners of the mine Bautenberg between Gilsbach and Wilden, Dill and Westerwald), Dillbrecht 1994
