= Krah =

German electronic component company

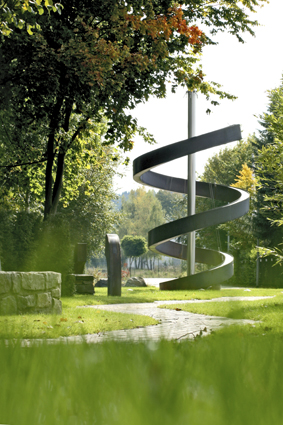
Sculptures in the company's park

The Krah Group is a German medium-sized, family-run company producing electronic components. Started in Drolshagen, Germany, in 1970 with 20 employees, the company grew to become the world market leader for resistors in the automotive industry with currently 2,000 employees in 16 sites across Europe, Asia and the Americas.

== History ==
The KRAH Group traces its origins to the foundation of M. KRAH Elektrotechnische Fabrik GmbH & Co. KG, established through a management buy-out by Theodor Hermann and Rainer Fiala. The company began with the production of wire-wound resistors for industrial applications, employing 20 people and generating a turnover of 600,000 DM in its early years.

In 1976, Eckhard Hermann joined as a managing partner, marking the beginning of a period of expansion. The company soon extended its operations to Italy, broadening its sales activities across Europe.

By 1980, KRAH entered the automotive sector, successfully completing its first development project for the Volkswagen Golf A1, followed by significant collaborations with Bosch for Holden Motors and the Golf A2. This diversification led to rapid growth in turnover.

The group continued its expansion in 1983 with the founding of Widap AG in Switzerland for the production and trade of resistors and resistor assemblies. That same year, KRAH acquired the wire resistor production of RWI (Rheinisch-Westfälische Isolatorenwerke) in Siegburg, leading to the foundation of RWI-Bauelemente GmbH + Co. KG, which later became KRAH-RWI Elektronische Bauelemente GmbH in Drolshagen. These developments laid the foundation for the modern KRAH Group.

The 1990s saw further growth, with approximately 250 employees and 1,000 home workers in Drolshagen, and the introduction of automated production lines. The company also founded WITEC Widerstandstechnik GmbH & Co. KG in Dömitz, Mecklenburg-West Pomerania, expanding its resistor production capabilities.

KRAH continued its international expansion by establishing Resistec UPR d.o.o. & Co. k.d. in Slovenia through the acquisition of Iskra's production facilities. The group also became a founding member of the Association of Innovative Automotive Suppliers (VIA) in South Westphalia, Germany, and was involved in the creation of the Automotive Center Südwestfalen e. V. (ACS Innovations), focusing on research and development in the automotive industry.

In 1999, KRAH acquired a majority stake in Holzschuh GmbH & Co. KG, entering the cable rewinding systems market with operations in Germany and Slovenia. The same year, KRAH-ICE-BRASIL was established in Brazil, and a joint venture was formed in Shanghai, China. By the end of the decade, the group employed over 1,000 people.

The early 2000s saw further organizational growth, including the foundation of Athos Elektrosysteme GmbH, a merger of cable-rewinder divisions, and the opening of a new plant in Knittlingen, Baden-Württemberg. The group also expanded into India through joint ventures for resistor production, and into Brazil with the acquisition of Hightech, adding spark-plug connectors to its portfolio.

By 2010, the KRAH Group employed over 1,500 people and achieved a turnover exceeding €100 million. In 2012, Christian Hermann joined the management, and the group established a joint venture in India with Woory (Korea) for automotive resistor production. The group also formed a joint venture with KSI and WIDAP for the Indian market.

Further expansion included the acquisition of WIKO in Klötze, Saxony-Anhalt, to enhance suppressor production, and the foundation of Widap electronic components in Munich as a distributor. By 2015, the group’s turnover surpassed €150 million.

In 2017, Katarina Brück assumed technical management within the board. That year, the group, together with South Korean partner HyoSeong, founded HKR Automotive GmbH through the takeover of HKR Seuffer Automotive GmbH & Co. KG, focusing on the development and production of complex controllers for automotive air conditioning systems.
