= Wilnsdorf =

- Municipality
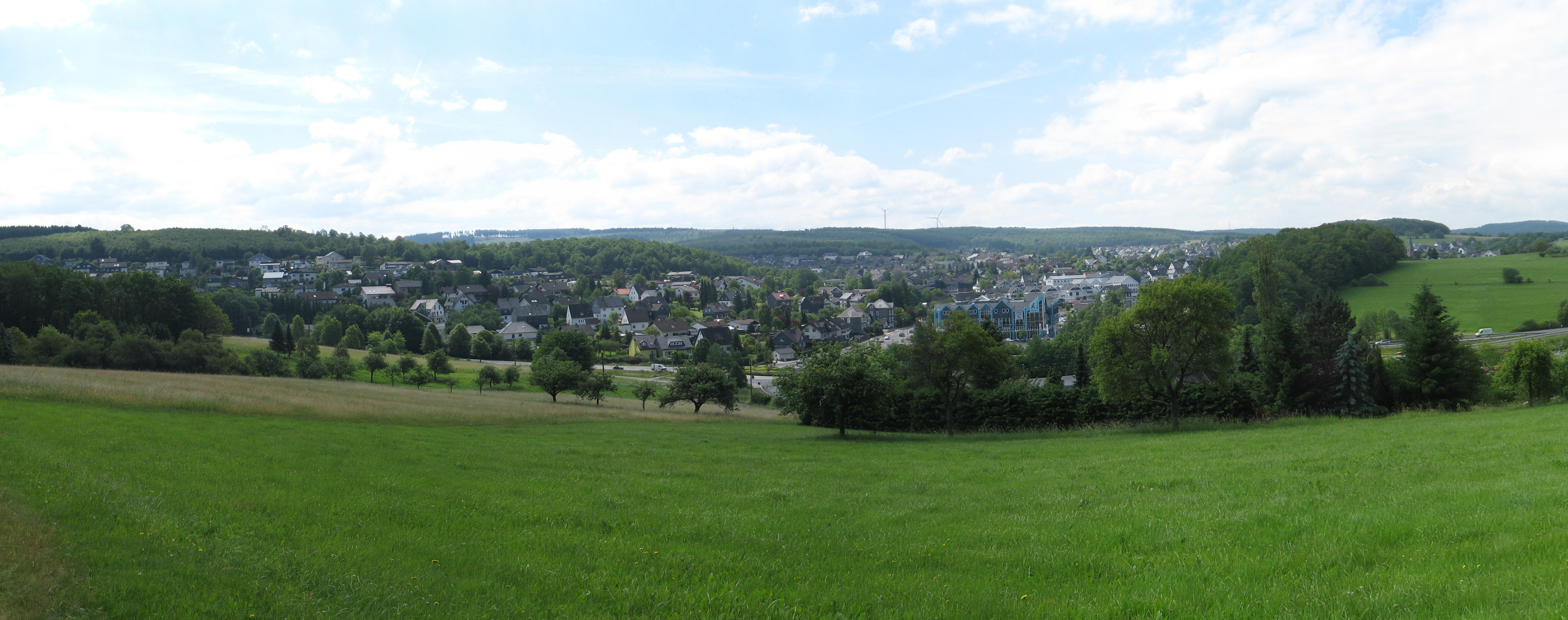

- Coat of arms

- Location of Wilnsdorf within Siegen-Wittgenstein district
- Interactive map of Wilnsdorf
- Location within Germany Location within North Rhine-Westphalia
- Coordinates: 50°49′00″N 08°06′00″E
- Country: Germany
- State: North Rhine-Westphalia
- Admin. region: Arnsberg
- District: Siegen-Wittgenstein

Government
  - Mayor (2020–25): Hannes Gieseler

Area
  - Total: 72.04 km^{2} (27.81 sq mi)
- Elevation: 350 m (1,150 ft)

Population (2025-12-31)
  - Total: 19,936
  - Density: 276.7/km^{2} (716.7/sq mi)
- Time zone: UTC+01:00 (CET)
  - Summer (DST): UTC+02:00 (CEST)
- Postal codes: 57234
- Dialling codes: 02739, 02737
- Vehicle registration: SI
- Website: www.wilnsdorf.de

Wilnsdorf (German pronunciation: [ˈvɪlnsˌdɔʁf]) is a municipality in the district of Siegen-Wittgenstein, in North Rhine-Westphalia, Germany.

== Geography ==
The southern municipal limits, with the Kalteiche peak, part of the Rothaargebirge, form not only the community's highest point, at 579 m above sea level, but also the boundary between Hesse (Lahn-Dill-Kreis) and North Rhine-Westphalia. The heights lie between 290 m above sea level and 579 m at the Kalteiche.

=== Constituent communities ===
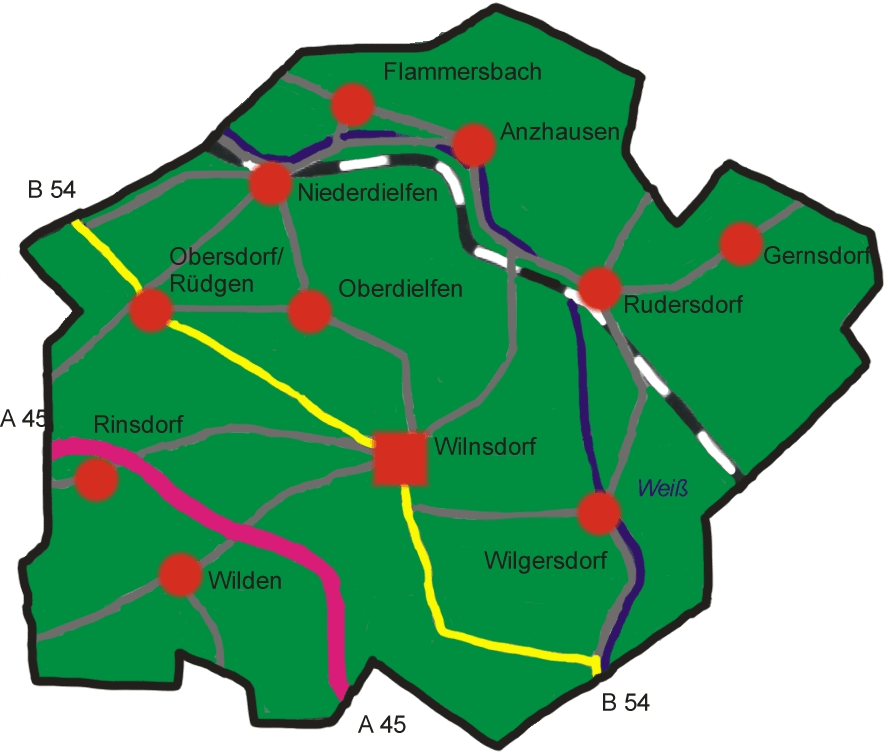
Constituent communities

- Anzhausen
- Flammersbach
- Gernsdorf
- Niederdielfen
- Oberdielfen
- Obersdorf/Rödgen
- Rinsdorf
- Rudersdorf
- Wilden
- Wilgersdorf
- Wilnsdorf

Niederdielfen and Oberdielfen are named for the River Dielfe, which flows through them. Niederdielfen was the home of the painter Adolf Saenger, after whom the street Adolf-Saenger-Weg in Niederdielfen is named.

== Population ==
Historical population

Year	Pop.	±% p.a.
1965	14,668	—
1970	16,451	+2.32%
1975	17,696	+1.47%
1980	19,125	+1.57%
1985	19,693	+0.59%
1990	20,497	+0.80%
1995	21,630	+1.08%

Year	Pop.	±% p.a.
2000	21,637	+0.01%
2005	21,405	−0.22%
2010	20,752	−0.62%
2015	20,512	−0.23%
2020	19,975	−0.53%
2025	19,936	−0.04%

Source: Landesdatabank Nordrhein-Westfalen

== History ==
Wilnsdorf had its first documentary mention in 1185 under the name Willelmesdorf. A further form of the community's name is also recorded, Wielandisdorf, which is based on a local legend about a blacksmith named Wieland (also known as Weyland in English) who, according to local lore, lived nearby. It is true that iron mining and smelting had their beginnings in Wilnsdorf, and throughout the Siegerland, many centuries ago. History first mentions a mine in what is today the community's municipal area in 1298.

Between the late 12th century and the mid 17th century, the castle and stately home of the Knights of Kolbe were to be found in Wilnsdorf. They were at this time the Vögte ( ≈ reeves) of the Princes of Nassau-Siegen over broad parts of the Siegerland. In Napoleonic Times, Wilnsdorf, like the rest of the Siegerland, lay under the rule of the Grand Duchy of Berg.

In the early 19th century, the communities of Eisern, Obersdorf-Rödgen, Rinsdorf, Wilgersdorf, Wilnsdorf, Niederdielfen and Oberdielfen, by now all in Prussia, were united under the Amt of Wilnsdorf. Later, the community of Wilden, formerly part of the Amt of Burbach, was also included in the Amt of Wilnsdorf.

In 1957, mining in Wilnsdorf came to an end, and the last iron mine was shut down. On 1 January 1969, the formerly independent municipalities in the Amt were united to form the greater community of Wilnsdorf, the only exception being Eisern, which went to the town (now city) of Siegen. The municipal head from 1969 until 2004, first as community director and then as mayor, was Karl Schmidt, who after retiring was made the community's first honorary citizen.

=== Gernsdorf ===
Gernsdorf was likely first settled sometime about 800 or 900. About 1300, Gernsdorf had its first documentary mention under the name "Gernstorff". About six years later, likewise through a document, the name "Herman von Gernstorf" crops up.

== Politics ==
=== Municipal council ===
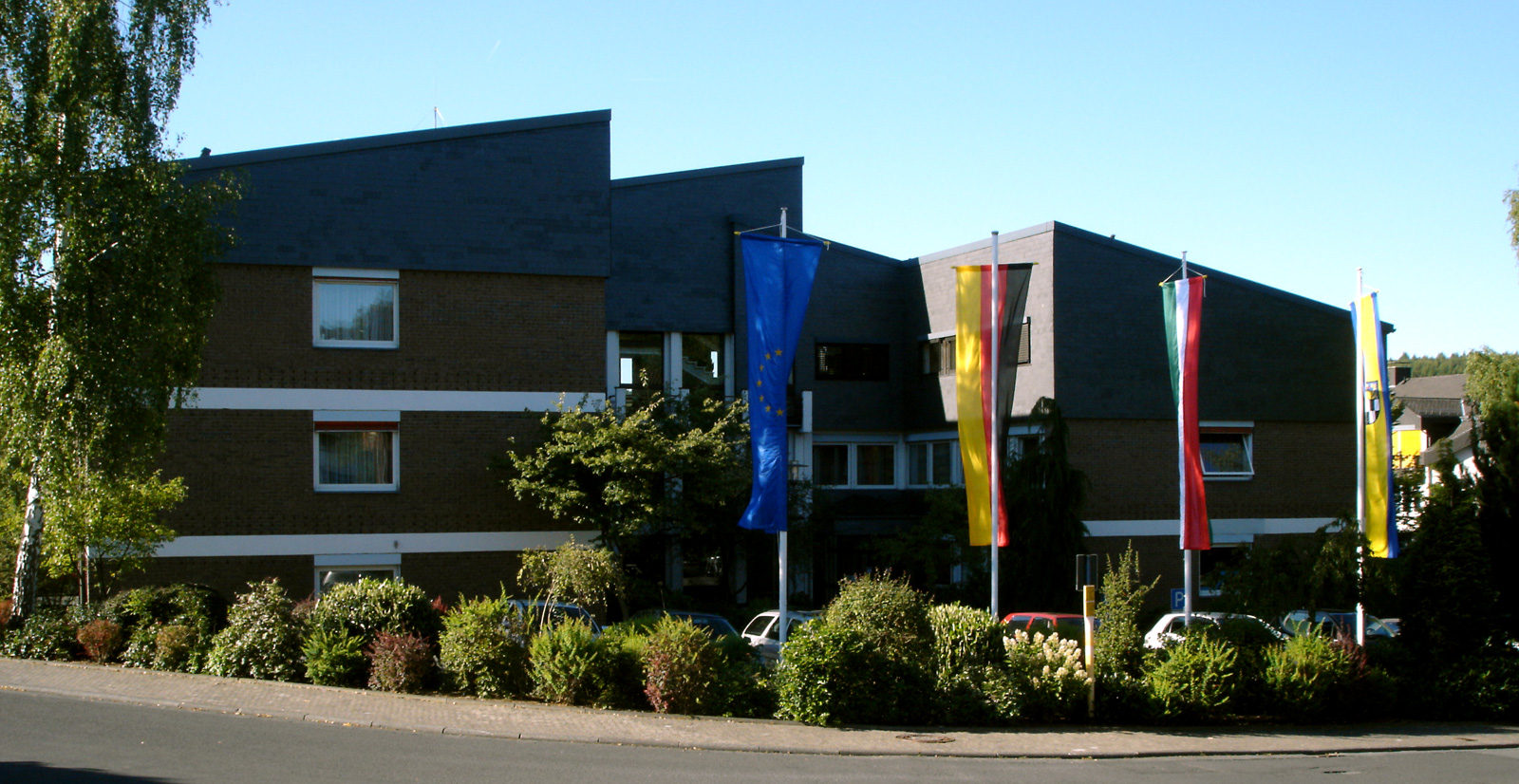
Wilnsdorf Town Hall

The council's 36 seats are apportioned thus, in accordance with municipal elections held on 26 September 2004:

	CDU	SPD	Greens	FDP	UWG	total
2004	22	8	2	4	0	36

Note: UWG is a citizens' coalition.

=== Coat of arms ===
Wilnsdorf's old arms

Wilnsdorf's old coat of arms showed a crescent in the chief, but these arms were dropped in 1969 after amalgamation, losing their legal validity , and the current coat of arms, identical to that formerly borne by the now abolished Amt of Wilnsdorf, might heraldically be described thus: Party per fess, above, in azure a lion rampant Or armed and langued gules with seven billets Or, below, party per fess, above in argent two pallets sable, below, in sable two pallets argent.

The lion is from Nassau's arms, the colours blue and gold (or yellow) being Nassau's colours. The lower part of the shield comes from the arms of the Knights of Kolbe.

=== Partnerships ===
- (Germany) Steinbach-Hallenberg, Thuringia, since 2 October 1992

== Culture ==
=== forum kultur wilnsdorf ===
Near the municipal hall is the forum kultur wilnsdorf – customarily written with lowercase initial letters – consisting of a folklore museum and a cultural history meeting place. The folklore museum offers, on two floors, realistic looks into many fields of life and work in the southern Siegerland in the early 20th century. A separate exhibition recalls mining times in the Siegerland. A nature study cabinet exposes the visitor to the Siegerland's insect and plant life.

The cultural history meeting place affords one a "trip through time": from geology through the Stone Age and the ancient civilizations and into the Middle Ages and modern times. Changing special exhibitions deepen and broaden the range of offerings.

== Sightseeing ==
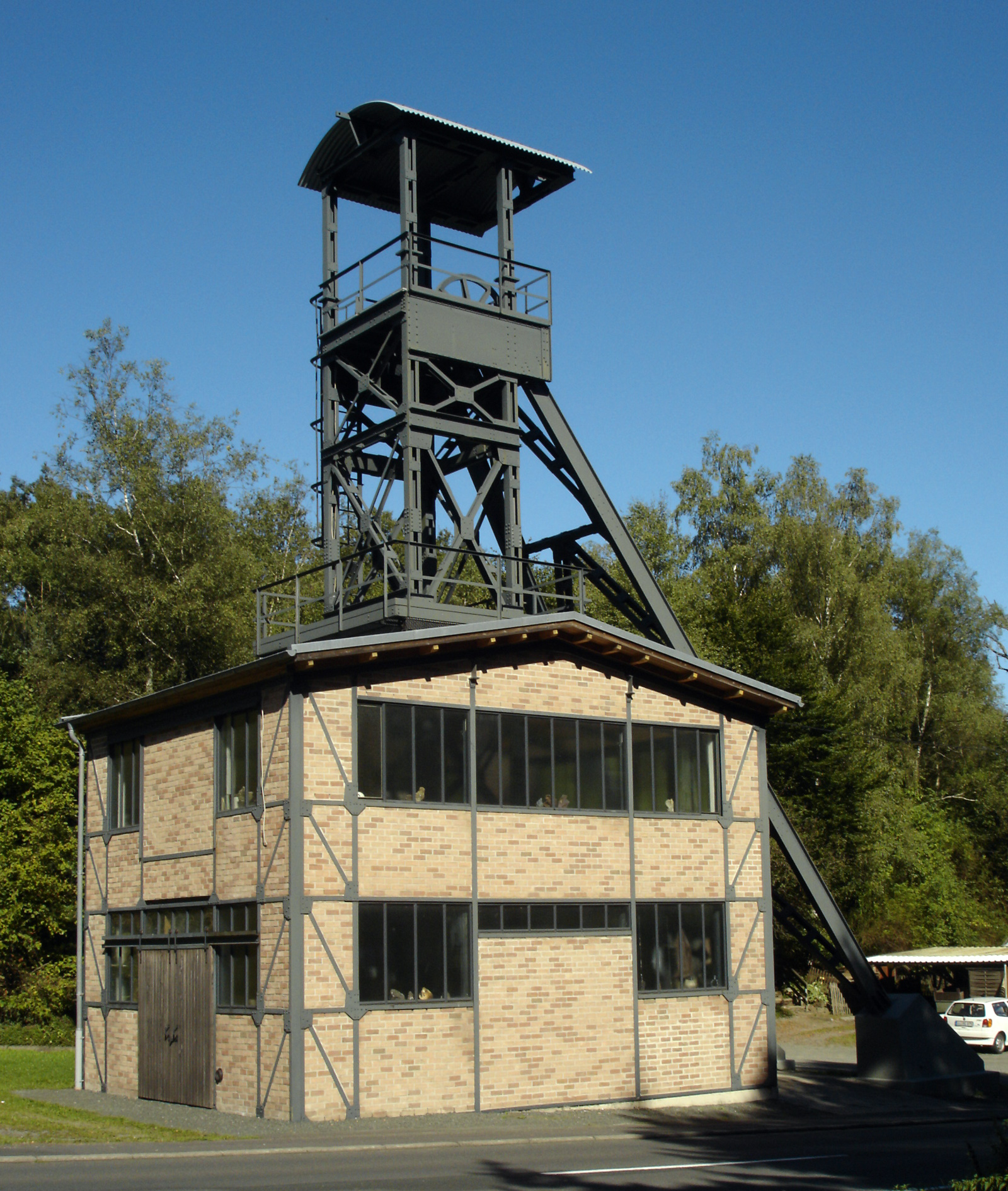
Niederdielfen headframe

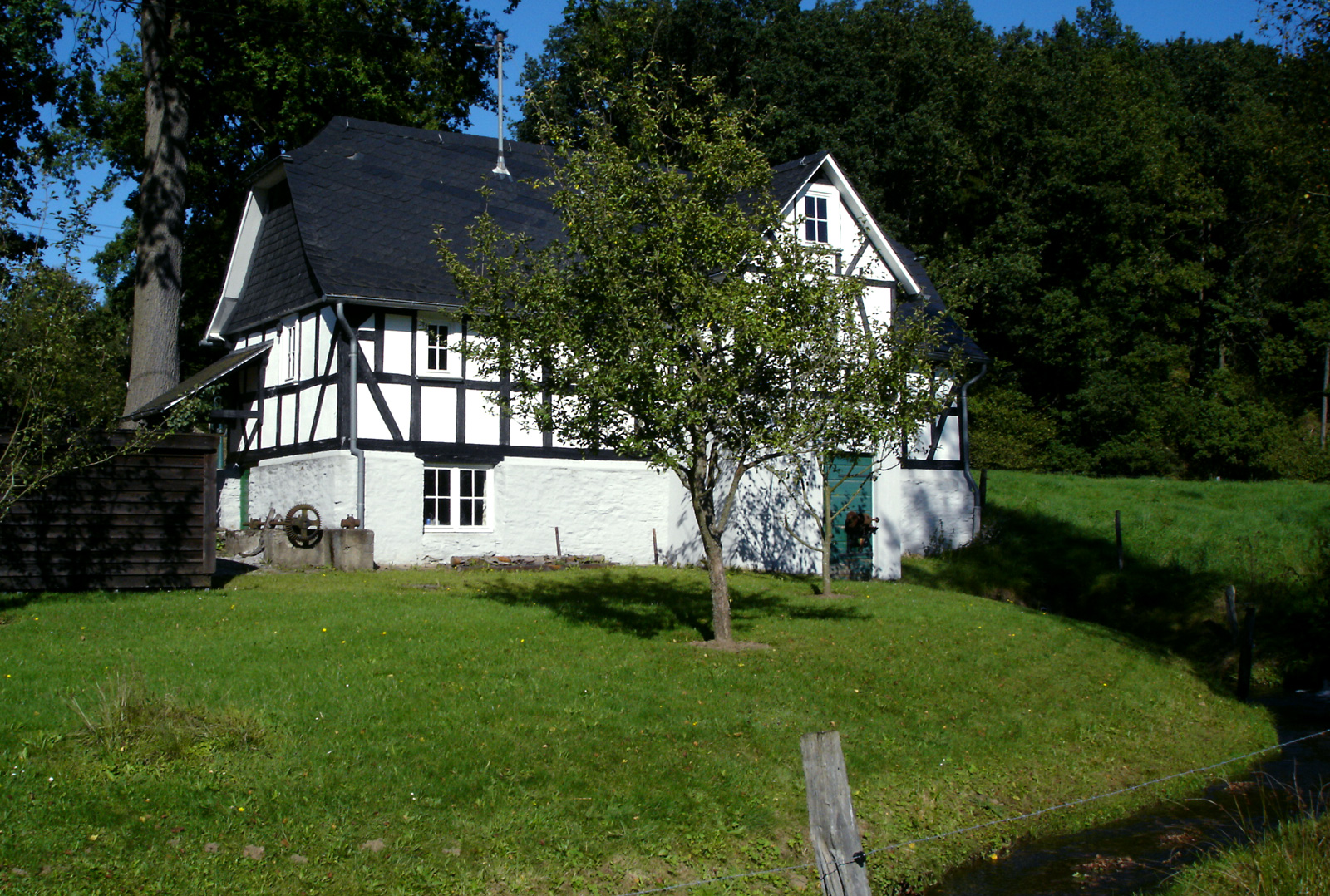
Niederdielfen watermill

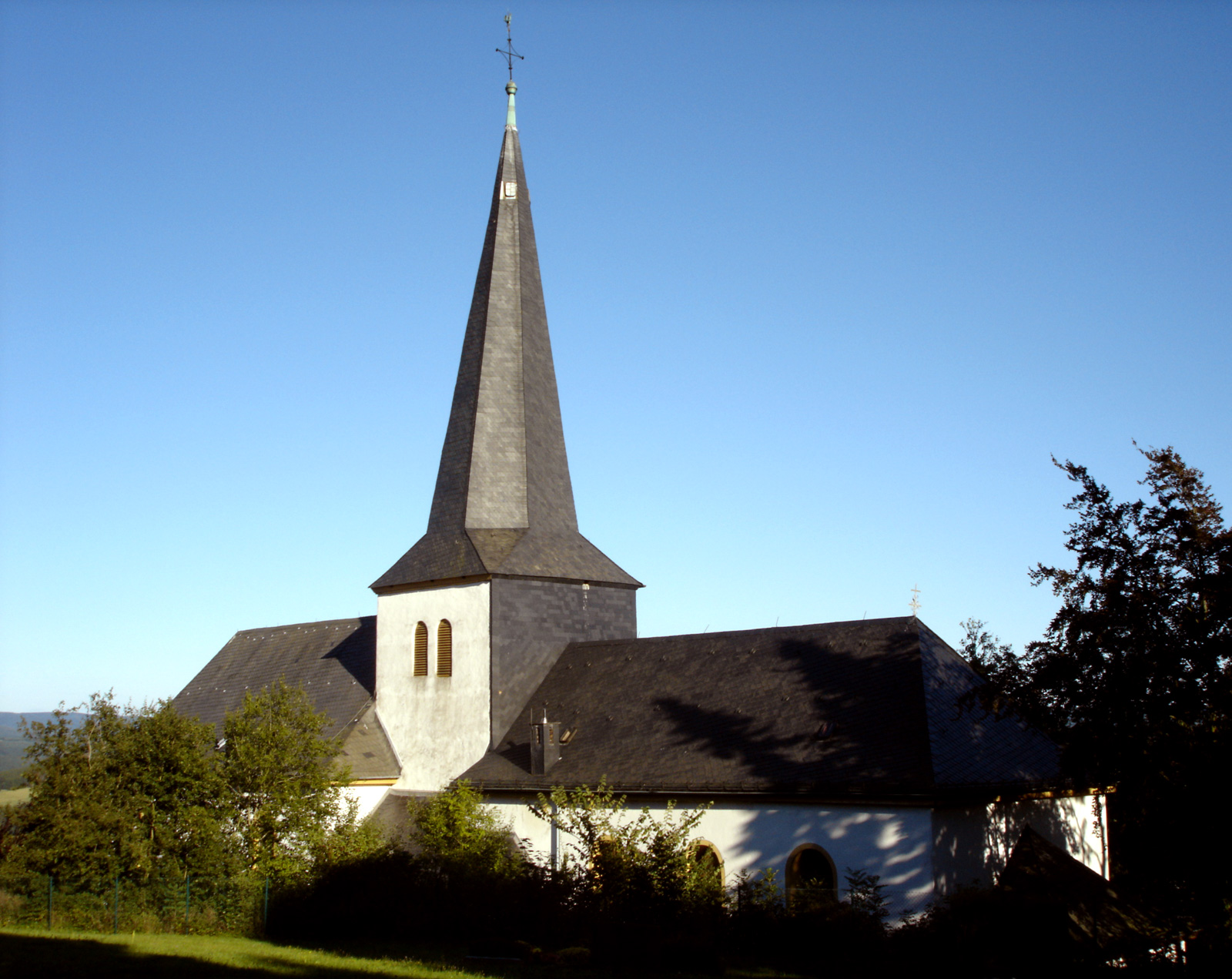
Rödgen parish church

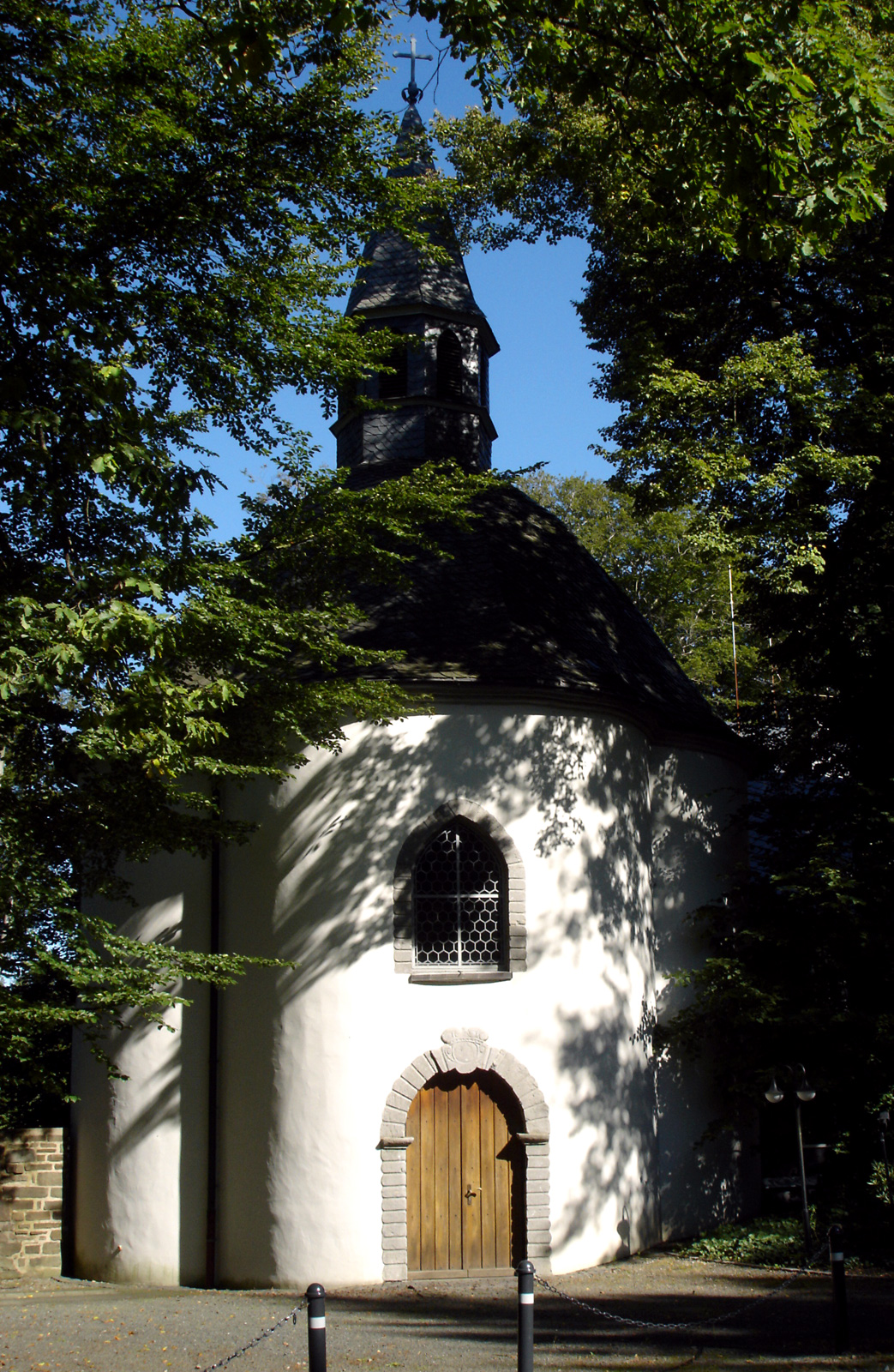
Chapel at the Eremitage pilgrimage place

=== Obersdorf Iron-Age smelting furnace ===
Since iron ore was to be found quite near the surface and recovered without complicated mining procedures, the era of iron smelting in the Siegerland goes right back to La Tène times (500 BC). Witness thereto is the Iron-Age blast furnace called Silberquelle ("Silver Source") on the Homberg in Wilnsdorf-Obersdorf.

=== Niederdielfen headframe ===
Within today's community of Wilnsdorf, eight mines were in operation into the early 20th century. The original headframe at the 'Grimberg' mine in Niederdielfen was torn down in 1911 when the mine shut down. In 1995, the headframe from the Julianschacht in Bensberg was reconstructed on the old mine's lands, thereby recalling the region's almost 2500-year mining and smelting history. The 16 m-high tower with its shaft building is regarded as typical of mining works in the Siegerland, even though it is from outside the region.

=== Niederdielfen watermill ===
The mill, lying on the Filsbachtälchen ("small Filsbach valley") and built in the first half of the 18th century, was restored to working condition in 1992-1993 and can be visited while it is working several times a year. The mill's grinding gear, including mechanical works made partly of wrought iron and partly of cast iron, is wholly preserved. The building date, however, is not exactly clear. It is documented that the mill was built in the first half of the 18th century, and local oral history holds that it was built in 1729.

=== Heimatstube Rinsdorf ===
In the "Rinsdorf Local History Parlour", built in 1791, originally as a chapel school, documents and tools from the region's mining history and Siegerland handicraft artistry are exhibited. Moreover, there is a 19th-century schoolroom built true to the original. Before the building stands a statue of a miner and his mining cart. In an outbuilding, many agricultural devices are to be seen.

=== Wilden village smithy ===
This smithy from the mid 19th century is almost fully preserved thanks to the Wildener Heimatverein's efforts and can even be seen working on special occasions. The smithy originally stood in the Köhlerweg ("Charcoal Maker Way"), but was moved to the middle of Wilden and reconstructed there in 1984.

=== Wilnsdorf Arrest Building ===
The Arrestgebäude is one of the very few fully preserved buildings of its kind and is a good example of police work in the 19th century. Between 1839 and 1959, the building was used as an arrest building and offers a glimpse into penal enforcement in those days.

=== Rödgen parish church ===
The parish church in Rödgen was first mentioned in a document on 4 March 1328. The old church was torn down in 1778 because it had become run down, and between 1779 and 1782 it was built anew in its current form. Owing to a dispute between Catholics and Protestants, a new church was built in 1787-1788 west of the tower, putting the church tower in the middle of the building, where it could be used by both denominations, standing as a symbol of a readiness between the two groups to compromise.

- Church tower – The church tower itself stands on a Romanesque foundation. At the tower is a memorial plaque from 1765 with a Latin inscription. The tower's base covers an area of 4.7 × 4.7 m. The carillon consists of three bells. The oldest, from 1515, is rung to call worshippers to the Angelus, weighs 723 kg, and has no particular name. There is also a verse by the Oberdorf poet Wilhelm Schmidt inscribed on the bell.
- Evangelical part – The building of the older, Evangelical church is 23 m long and about 13 m wide. The building is shaped by the slender, high windows. The original organ, built in 1680, was installed in the newer church building in 1782, but was replaced with a new one in 1858. The Röver organ in the church at the moment, from 1899, is a rarity in Westphalia.
- Catholic part – The wing built in 1788 exhibits a clear rectangular base 18.2 m long and 9.2 m wide. It was extended by a fourth window shaft in 1938.

=== Eremitage ===
The Eremitage pilgrimage place comes from the year 1684. To this pilgrimage place belong a chapel, a saint's cottage with a hermit's grave, a way of the Cross, a forest altar and a hermitage. In the chapel is an altar from 1736. The hermitage is among the Siegerland's oldest half-timbered houses.

The Eremitage pilgrimage place was expanded in 1953 with the founding of an Order of Poor Ladies convent.

=== Rieselwiese ===
In Rinsdorf on state road (Landesstraße) L 907 is the Rieselwiese, a meadow dating from 1996. As making charcoal was so important to iron smelting and woods could therefore not be cleared, there was a dearth of hay meadows for growing livestock fodder. For this reason, the few meadows on the valley floors were watered by the Siegerland farmers using a complex system so as to make them more fruitful with the suspended matter and minerals in the water. By doing this, they raised winter fodder yields by a third.

== Economy and infrastructure ==
=== Transport ===
Wilnsdorf lies on Federal Highway (Bundesstraße) B 54 and has at its disposal its own Autobahn interchange on the A45 right near which, in September 2005, a service centre – an Autohof, meaning one that does not have its own on- and off-ramps – with a filling station, a hotel and several restaurants opened. Wilnsdorf has a station on the Dill railway, served by line RB95 of Hessische Landesbahn, section DreiLänderBahn. Wilnsdorf is located in the area of the fare association Westfalen-Tarif.

== Notable people ==
- Gerhard Neuser, former football player with Sportfreunde Siegen and FC Schalke 04
- Karl Schmidt, honorary citizen of Wilnsdorf, community director and later mayor from 1969 to 2004
