= Heller (river) =

River in Germany

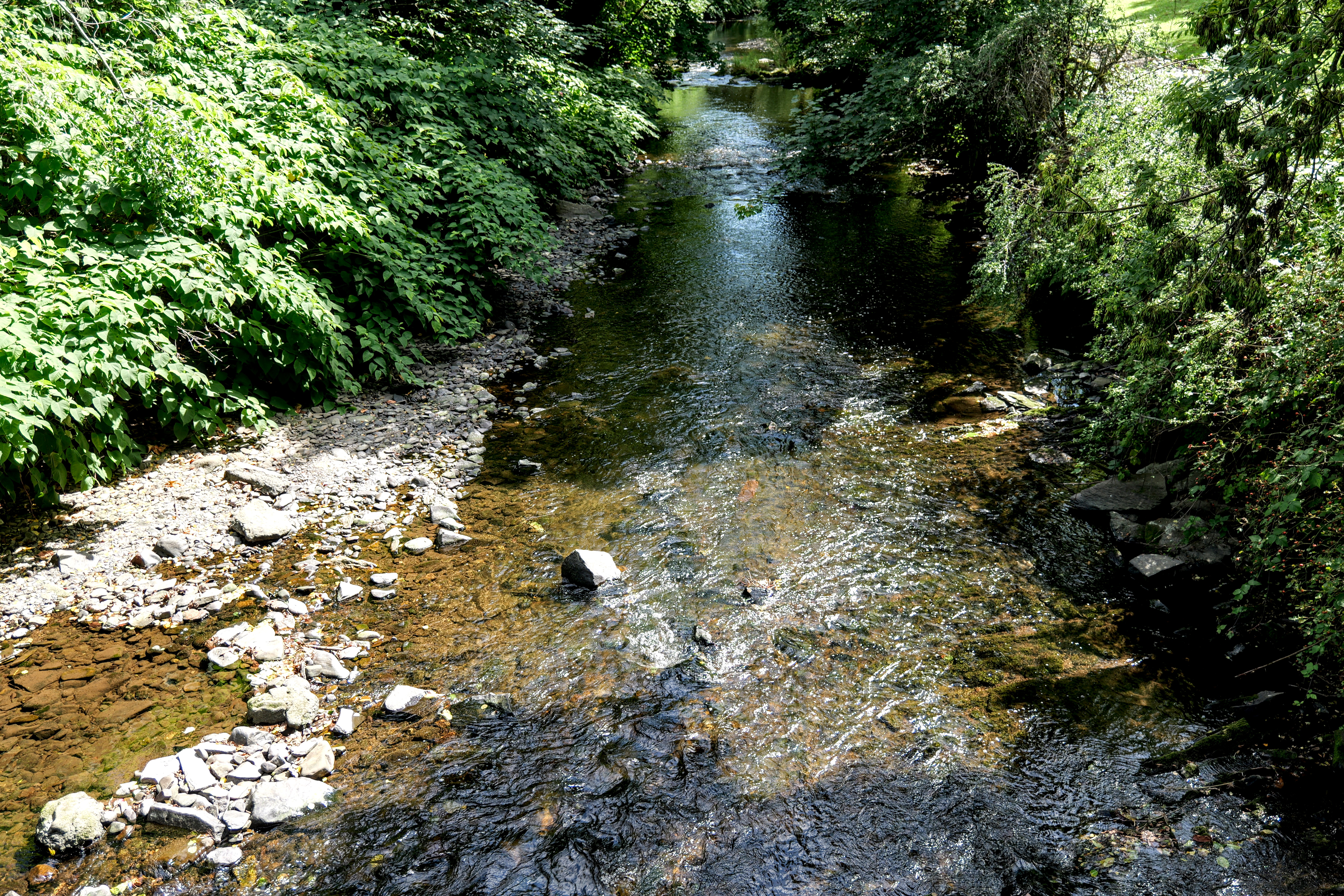
- The Heller in Alsdorf

Location
- Country: Germany
- States: Hesse; North Rhine-Westphalia; Rhineland-Palatinate

Physical characteristics
- Mouth
  - location: Sieg
  - coordinates: 50.7894°N 7.8713°E
- Length: 30.1 km (18.7 mi)
- Basin size: 204 km^{2} (79 sq mi)

Basin features
- Progression: Sieg→ Rhine→ North Sea

The Heller is a 30 km long river in western Germany. It is a left tributary of the Sieg. The source is located near Haiger in Hesse. It flows through Burbach and Neunkirchen in North Rhine-Westphalia. It flows into the river Sieg in Betzdorf, Rhineland-Palatinate. Its basin area is 204 km².

== See also ==
- List of rivers of North Rhine-Westphalia
- List of rivers of Rhineland-Palatinate
- List of rivers of Hesse
