= List of mountains and hills of the Westerwald =

This list of mountains and hills of the Westerwald contains a selection of the mountains, hills and high points of the Westerwald range which lies in the German states of Hesse, North Rhine-Westphalia and Rhineland-Palatinate. The Westerwald is, in turn, part of the Rhenish Massif and includes some or all of the nature parks of Bergisches Land, Nassau, Rhine-Westerwald and Siebengebirge.

See also these lists:
Mountains and hills of the Rhenish Massif / Mountains and hills of Hesse / Mountains and hills of North Rhine-Westphalia / Mountains and hills of Rhineland-Palatinate

The table is arranged in order of height in metres (m) above Normalhöhennull (NHN; unless otherwise stated). By clicking on the symbols at the head of each column, it can be resorted . In the column "Mountain or hill", alternative names are given in brackets, italics and small lettering. In this column, where there are two or more mountains or hills with the same name they are distinguished by their location in brackets and small lettering.

The abbreviations used in the table are explained below.

Mountain or hill	Height (m)	Natural region(s) or nature park	Location (in/near)	County or counties (see abbreviations below)	State (see abbreviations below)	Comment/s	Image
Fuchskaute	657.3	High Westerwald	Willingen	WW	RP	Highest mountain in the Westerwald; S: Nister; Ex-Viewing tower; Inn; NSG Fuchskaute (0.4 km²; 1984)	The Fuchskaute from the west: North top (left) and South Top (right); foreground: part of Bretthausen; behind: Willingen
Stegskopf	654.4	High Westerwald	Emmerzhausen-Stegskopf	AK	RP	S: Daade, S: Kleiner Nister; S: Black Nister; Ex-Viewing tower; Daaden Training Area	
Salzburger Kopf	654.2	High Westerwald	Bretthausen, Salzburg, Stein-Neukirch	WW	RP	Ski piste, transmission tower and wind farm	View from the SSW along the Kreisstraße 54 between Hellenhahn-Schellenberg and Neustadt/Westerwald to the Salzburger Kopf
Altenberg	651.4	High Westerwald	Waigandshain, Waldaubach	WW, LDK	RP, HE	Wind farm	View from the der B 414 bei Nister-Möhrendorf ostsüdostwärts to the Altenberg
Galgenberg	649.7	High Westerwald	Salzburg, Stein-Neukirch, Hof	WW	RP		View from the west
Höllberg (Höllkopf)	642.8	High Westerwald	Hohenroth	LDK	HE	Telecommunication tower, Ski lift	View from the Driedorf to the Höllberg; highest hill of the Westerwald in Hesse
Kühfelder Stein	637.7	High Westerwald	Stein-Neukirch	WW	RP	near: Siegerland Airport; NSG Buchheller source region (2.03 km²; 2002); Daaden Training Area	
Homberg	635.3	High Westerwald	Homberg, Waigandshain	WW	RP	S: Breitenbach; S: Rehbach near: Breitenbach Viaduct, NSG Breitenbach Viaduct (0.49 km²; 1988)	
Großefeld	621.25	High Westerwald	Hohenroth	LDK	HE		
Auf der Baar	615.0	High Westerwald	Heisterberg, Waldaubach	LDK	HE	Near: NSG Rückerscheid mit Aubachtal (0.78 km²; 1994); NSG Bermershube bei Heisterberg (0.44 km²; 1984)	Auf der Baar from the west
Bartenstein (Barstein)	614	High Westerwald	Gusternhain	LDK	HE	NSG Viehweide am Barstein (0.2 km²; 1984)	Bartenstein from the NW
Trödelsteine	613.0	High Westerwald	Emmerzhausen, Burbach	AK, SI	RP, NW	ND Trödelsteine (rock formation)	
Alsberg	612.6	High Westerwald	Rehe, Rennerod, Waigandshain	WW	RP	Rennerod Training Area near: Breitenbach Viaduct, NSG Breitenbach Viaduct (0.49 km²; 1988) and Krombach Viaduct mit NSG Krombach Viaduct (0.43 km²; 1981)	View from the SW over Rennerod to the Alsberg
Hahn	611.7	High Westerwald	Stein-Neukirch	WW	RP		
Ketzerstein	610.1	High Westerwald	Liebenscheid-Weißenberg	WW	RP	ND Ketzerstein	Die Basaltgruppe auf dem Ketzerstein
Nenkersberg	610.3	High Westerwald	Burbach	SI	NW		
Knoten	605.4	High Westerwald	Arborn	LDK	HE	S: Kallenbach; S: Ulmbach	View from the Knoten summit over the Lahn Westerwald
Heimerich	604.5	High Westerwald	Nisterberg	AK	RP	Daaden Training Area	
Backofen	602.3	High Westerwald	Hof	WW	RP	Daaden Training Area	
Gallpüsch	594.0	High Westerwald	Westernohe	WW	RP	NSG Wacholderheide Westernohe (0.13 km²; 1967)	
Höh	586.9	High Westerwald	Hof	WW	RP		
Rother Berg	571.9	High Westerwald	Heiligenborn	LDK	HE		View from the Nordwesten
Marienberg Heights	570	High Westerwald	Bad Marienberg, Bölsberg, Kirburg, Unnau	WW	RP	ND Großer Wolfstein (555 m above NHN) and Kleiner Wolfstein (557 m above NHN); On SSW flank: Bad Marienberg Wildlife Park with the Hedwigturm (AT)	View from the southeast over Bad Marienberg to the Marienberg Heights
Löh	566.6	High Westerwald	Oberroßbach	WW	RP		
Funkenhahn	559.7	High Westerwald	Rennerod, Westernohe	WW	RP		
Alarmstange	545.2	Lower Westerwald (Montabaur Heights); NP Nassau	Hillscheid, Horressen	WW	RP	Telecommuication tower	Telecommunication towers on the Alarmstange
Köppel	540.2	Lower Westerwald (Montabaur Heights); NP Nassau	Dernbach, Horressen	WW	RP	Viewing tower	The Köppel with viewing and telecommunication towers
Kackenberger Stein (Neuhochsteiner Berg)	525	High Westerwald	Neuhochstein, Hahn bei Marienberg	WW	RP	Hochstein (Hohenstein; basalt rock formation; ND)	
Hohenseelbachskopf	517.5	Southern Hellerbergland	Altenseelbach, Biersdorf, Daaden, Herdorf, Struthütten	SI, AK	NW, RP		
Röhrshahn	517	High Westerwald	Langenhahn-Hölzenhausen, Ailertchen	WW	RP		
Hinstein (Hindstein)	514.7		Greifenstein	LDK	HE	ND Hinstein, NSG Am Hinstein bei Greifenstein (0.13 km²; 1986)	View from Volkersbach services on the A 45 near Katzenfurt westwards over the Dill valley and past Greifenstein Castle to the Hinstein (half right)
Gräbersberg	513.1	Upper Westerwald	Alpenrod	WW	RP	Viewing tower with transmitters	The Gräbersberg from the NE
Großer Weißenstein	509.8	Upper Westerwald	Lochum	WW	RP	near: Westerwald Lakes	
Mahlscheid (Malscheid)	509.3	Southern Heller Upland	Altenseelbach, Biersdorf, Daaden, Herdorf, Struthütten	SI, AK	NW, RP		
Götzenberg	501.0		Stockum-Püschen	WW	RP	Natural monument	
Stöffel	498		Enspel, Nistertal-Büdingen, Stockum-Püschen	WW	RP	Basalt quarry; Stöffel Park	
Helleberg	491.3	Upper Westerwald	Weidenhahn	WW	RP	Viewing tower	View from the NNE to the Helleberg with the K 61 (Rotenhain–Wölferlingen)
Beulsstein	483.1	Upper Westerwald	Ettinghausen, Sainerholz	WW	RP	S: Ahrbach; S: Aubach	
Hartenfelser Kopf	478.5	Upper Westerwald	Hartenfels	WW	RP	near: Westerwald Lakes	
Watzenhahn	475.4		Berzhahn, Girkenroth, Weltersburg, Willmenrod	WW	RP	near: basalt quarry mit ND Kranstein (372 m above NHN)	
Wölferlinger Kopf	467.5	Upper Westerwald	Wölferlingen	WW	RP	near: Westerwald Lakes	
Höchst	443.5	Lower Westerwald (Eppenrod Plateau); NP Nassau	Giershausen; Hirschberg; Horhausen; Isselbach; Langenscheid	EMS	RP	highest hill of the Esterau; Schaumburg Forest	
Asberg	441.0	Lower Westerwald (Rhine Westerwald Volcanic Ridge); Rhine-Westerwald NP	Erpel, Unkel	NR	RP	Basalt quarry, near: NSG Siebengebirge (42.72 km²; 1922)	View from the Birkig NE to the Asberg
Meerberg (Mehrberg, Düstemich)	430.5	Lower Westerwald (Rhine Westerwald Volcanic Ridge); Rhine-Westerwald NP	Linz am Rhein	NR	RP	Basalt quarry (formerly: 448 m above NN)	View from Birkig ESE to the Meerberg
Dernbacher Kopf	427.0	Lower Westerwald (Sayn-Wied-Hochfläche); Rhine-Westerwald NP	Dernbach, Rüscheid	NR	RP	S: Dernbach, Iserbach (Isenbach), Siehrsbach	
Kohlhau	426		Waldernbach, Fussingen	LM	HE	near: S: Kerkerbach	
Malberg (Moschheim)	422.0	Lower Westerwald (Montabaurer Senke)	Moschheim	WW	RP	Ringwall, NSG Malberg (0.96 km²; 1961)	View from the Staudt in the S to the Malberg
Minderberg	417.4	Lower Westerwald (Rhine Westerwald Volcanic Ridge); Rhine-Westerwald NP	Linz am Rhein	NR	RP	basalt quarry	
Hummelsberg	411	Lower Westerwald (Rhine Westerwald Volcanic Ridge); Rhine-Westerwald NP	Linz am Rhein, Hargarten	NR	RP	former circular rampart lost due to basalt quarrying; the hill lost 34 metres in height due to quarrying	View of the Hummelsberg and village of Hargarten from the ENE
Eichberg	407.5	Upper Westerwald	Molsberg	WW	RP		
Heidenhäuschen	397.9		Elbtal-Heidenhäuschen, Oberzeuzheim, Hintermeilingen	LM	HE	Ringwalls, Pilgrimage site, NSG Heidenhäuschen (1.1 km²; 1927)	View of the Heidenhäuschen from the Merenberg in the ENE
Stümperich	396	Vorderwesterwald; Rhine-Westerwald NP	Dattenberg	NR	RP	Former basalt quarry	
Dornburg	393.5	südlicher Westerwald	Wilsenroth	LM	HE	Oppidum, NSG Dornburg (0.53 km²; 1927)	
Hoher Schaden (Schaden)	388.3	Leuscheid, Bergisches Land NP	Rodder	SU	NW	S: Mühlenbach; S: Wohmbach, NSG Wälder auf dem Leuscheid (13.84 km²; 2004)	Summit of the Hoher Schaden
Beulskopf	388.2	Leuscheid	Birkenbeul, Beul, Heupelzen-Beul	AK	RP	Raiffeisen Tower (AT)	View from the SSE of the Beulskopf, Busenhausen and the Raiffeisen Tower
Römerich	386.4	Vorderwesterwald; Rhine-Westerwald NP	Dattenberg	NR	RP	Former basalt quarry	
Ginsterhahner Kopf	377	Rhine-Westerwald NP	Ginsterhahn	NR	RP	Linz am Rhein Transmitter	
Himmerich	366.4	Lower Westerwald (Rhine Westerwald Volcanic Ridge); Siebengebirge NP	Bad Honnef	SU	NW	NSG Siebengebirge (42.72 km²; 1922)	Rocky slopes (Latitkuppe) on the Himmerich
Köppel	364.4	Lower Westerwald (Altenkirchen Plateau)	Berod, Borod, Gieleroth, Herpteroth, Wahlrod	AK, WW	RP	S: Almersbach, Q: Boroder Bach, Q: Freudenberger Bach, Q: Gielerother Bach	
Willscheider Berg	363	Lower Westerwald (Rhine Westerwald Volcanic Ridge); Rhine-Westerwald NP	Vettelschoß	NR	RP		
Dachsberg	360.7	Lower Westerwald (Asbach Plateau); Siebengebirge NP	Orscheid	SU	NW	Basalt quarry	The Dachsberger See on the Dachsberg
Malberg (Mahlberg) (Hausen)	360	Rhine-Westerwald NP	Bad Hönningen, Hausen-Hähnen, Rheinbrohl	NR	RP	Malbergsee (Mahlbergsee)	
Leyberg	358.8	Lower Westerwald (Rhine Westerwald Volcanic Ridge); Siebengebirge NP	Bad Honnef	SU	NW	NSG Siebengebirge (42.72 km²; 1922)	View of the Siebengebirge from the Leyberg
Rennenberg	353.6	Rhine-Westerwald NP	Linz am Rhein	NR	RP	Rennenberg Castle	Ruins of the Rennenburg on the Rennenberg
Pfahlenberg (Pfahlberg)	346.2	Lower Westerwald (Kannenbäck Plateau); Rhine-Westerwald NP	Caan	WW	RP		
Herrenlay (Herrenlei)	320	NP Nassau	Dausenau	EMS	RP		
Roßbacher Häubchen	313	Lower Westerwald (Sayn-Wied-Hochfläche)	Breitscheid, Roßbach	NR	RP	Former basalt quarry	
Birkig	306.0	Lower Westerwald (Rhine Westerwald Volcanic Ridge); Rhine-Westerwald NP	Erpel, Bruchhausen	NR	RP		
Harmorgenberg (Hormorgenberg)	297.0	Lower Westerwald (Sayn-Wied-Hochfläche); Rhine-Westerwald NP	Heimbach-Weis	NR	RP	Upper Germanic-Rhaetian Limes (east slope)	
Eischeider Kopf	293	Lower Westerwald (Rhine Westerwald Volcanic Ridge); Rhine-Westerwald NP	Unkel, Rheinbreitbach	NR	RP		

== Abbreviations ==
The abbreviations used in the table (in alphabetical order) mean:

Districts or counties:

- AK = Altenkirchen (district)
- EMS = Rhein-Lahn-Kreis
- LDK = Lahn-Dill-Kreis
- LM = Limburg-Weilburg
- NR = Neuwied (district)
- SI = Siegen-Wittgenstein
- SU = Rhein-Sieg-Kreis
- WW = Westerwaldkreis

Federal states:

- HE = Hesse
- NW = North Rhine-Westphalia
- RP = Rhineland-Palatinate

Features:

- AT = Viewing tower
- Ex = former
- km² = square kilometres
- ND = natural monument
- NP = Nature Park
- NSG = Naturschutzgebiet (here: given with area and year designated)
- S = river source
- Mil trg area = Military training area
