= Rheinwesterwald Volcanic Ridge =

The Rheinwesterwald Volcanic Ridge (German: Rheinwesterwälder Vulkanrücken), or more rarely, the Asberg Plateau (Asberg-Hochfläche) is a hill ridge and natural region, roughly 13 kilometres long and 3 to 4 kilometres wide, in the north of the German state of Rhineland-Palatinate and south of North Rhine-Westphalia east of the Rhine, which is adjoined in the north by the Siebengebirge. The name was introduced in the late 1950s together with the natural regional major unit of Niederwesterwald.

The ridge or plateau also bears the regional name of Linzer Höhe ("Linz Hills") south of the Asberg. This name was being used by the 17th century to refer to the area outside the town walls of the church parish of Linz and on the side facing the hills.

== Hills ==
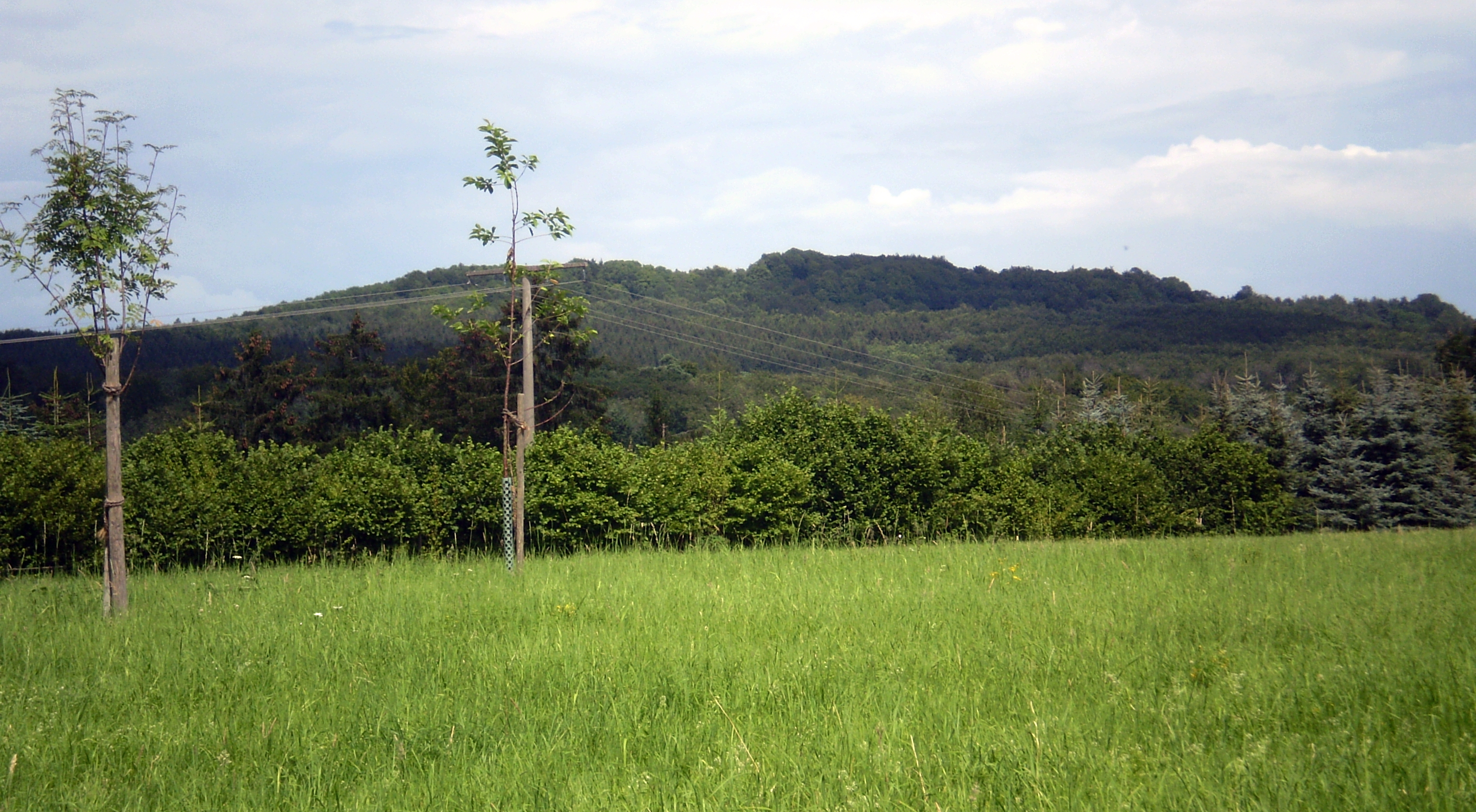
The Asberg, the highest point of the volcanic ridge

The hills of the region include the Asberg (441 m above NN), the Meerberg (431 m above NN), the Minderberg (417 m above NN), the Hummelsberg (411 m above NN), the Römerich (386 m above NN), the Willscheider Berg (360 m above NN) and the Himberg (335 m above NN). In the Siebengebirge Nature Park on the North Rhine-Westphalian side are also the Leyberg (359 m above NN), the Himmerich (366 m above NN), the Broderkonsberg (378 m above NN) and the Zickelburg (182 m above NN) (see also complete list). A majority of the area is counted as part of the forests of Erpeler Kirchspielwald, Dattenberger Wald and Leubsdorfer Wald.

== Places ==
The settlements of the natural region are Ginsterhahn, Grendel, Hargarten, Kaimig (municipality of St. Katharinen), Kretzhaus (borough of Linz am Rhein), Ober- and Untererl (municipality of Kasbach-Ohlenberg), (southwestern part of) Vettelschoß, Oberkalenborn (municipality of Vettelschoß), Ronigerhof (borough of Linz am Rhein) and Rothe Kreuz (municipality of Leubsdorf).

== Literature ==
- Bruno P. Kremer: Landschaften und Landschaftsformen im Kreis Neuwied. In: Heimat-Jahrbuch des Landkreises Neuwied 2007, pp. 305–310.
