= Trödelsteine =

Trödelsteine refers to the following geographical features near Emmerzhausen in the German state of Rhineland-Palatinate:

- Trödelsteine (mountain) (613.0 m)
- Trödelsteine (rock formation), rock formation and natural monument
