= Ockenfels (disambiguation) =

Ockenfels is a municipality Rhineland-Palatinate, Germany

Ockenfels may also refer to:

People:

- Axel Ockenfels (born 1969), German economist
- Frank W. Ockenfels III, American photographer
- Wolfgang Ockenfels, German Catholic priest and professor of Social Ethics

Other:

- SS Ockenfels, German cargo ship built in 1910
