= Notscheid =

Village in Germany

Coordinates: 50°36′04″N 7°20′14″E

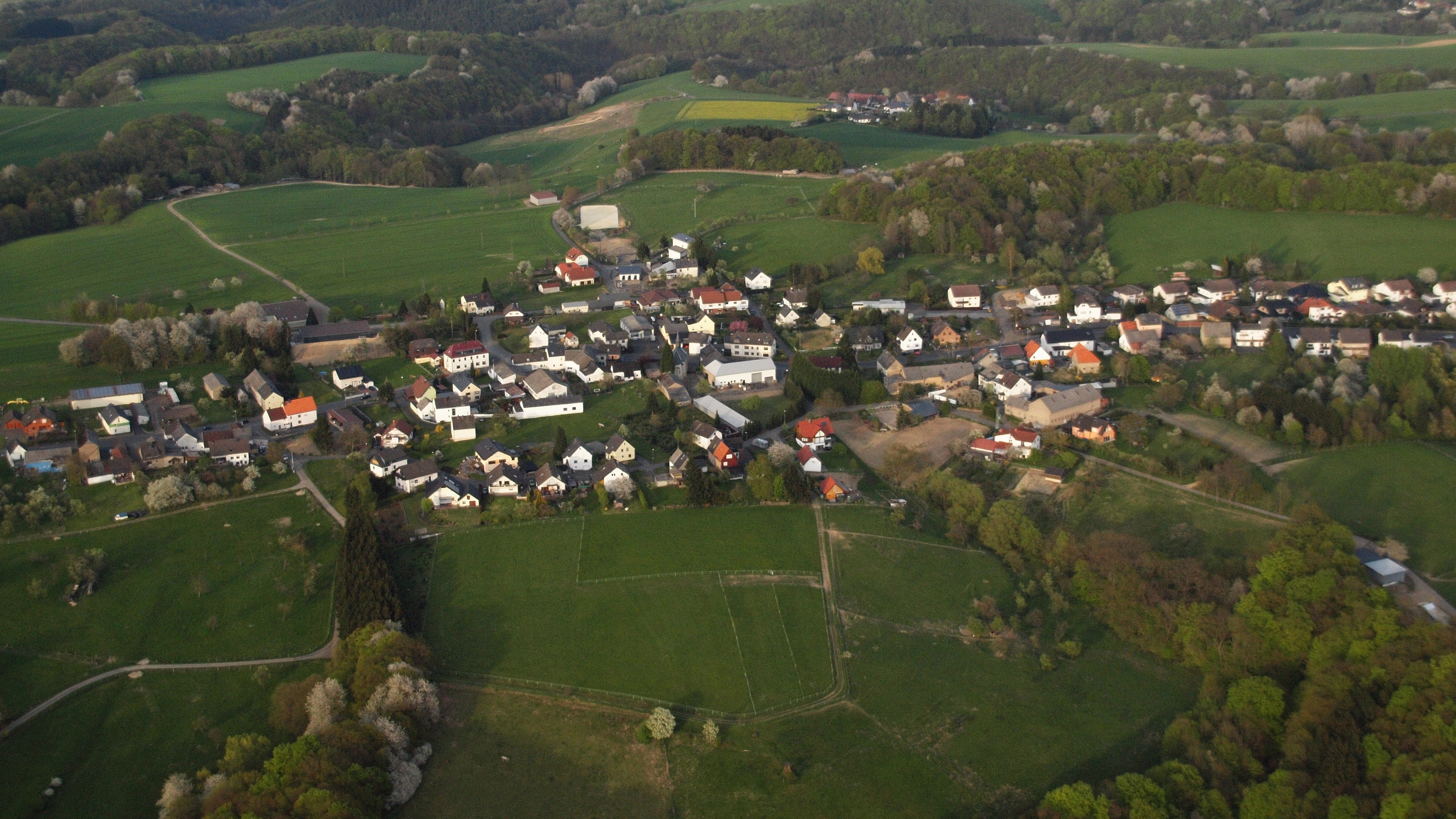
Notscheid

Notscheid is a locality in the municipality Sankt Katharinen in the district of Neuwied in Rhineland-Palatinate, Germany.

== Geography ==
The village lies on the watershed between the valleys of the Rhine and the Wied in low Westerwald northeast of the center of Sankt Katharinen. North of the village is the district boundary to local Vettelschoß, west is the district boundary of the municipality of Linz am Rhein.

== History ==
Notscheid probably dates back to the high medieval period of deforestation. The name appeared in numerous different versions, including Nodscheidt, Noschiedt, Noscheid, Noschet, Noschot, Noschit, Norscheid, and Noschoß. It is attributed to the location of Notscheid on a trunk road that was used in distress (German: Not) in case other roads were flooded.

Bürgermeisters of Notscheid:

1620–?	Johan Mertens
1662–?	Peter (Gemeinsmann of Hilkerscheid)
1708–1720	Servas Kortenbach
1720–?	Heinrich Weiß
1794–1813	Ägidius Kröll
1813–1851	Wilhelm Kröll
1851–1878	Johann Mohr jun.
1878–1888	Peter Ditscheid
1888–1915	Lorenz Mohr II
1915–1924	Wilhelm Jünger
1925–1936	Peter Nassen
1936–1943	Philipp Probst
1943–1946	Peter Nassen
1947–1956	Josef Frings
1956–1968	Willi Kröll
1968–1969	Ludwig Engels
