= Asberg (Westerwald) =

Hill of the Westerwald

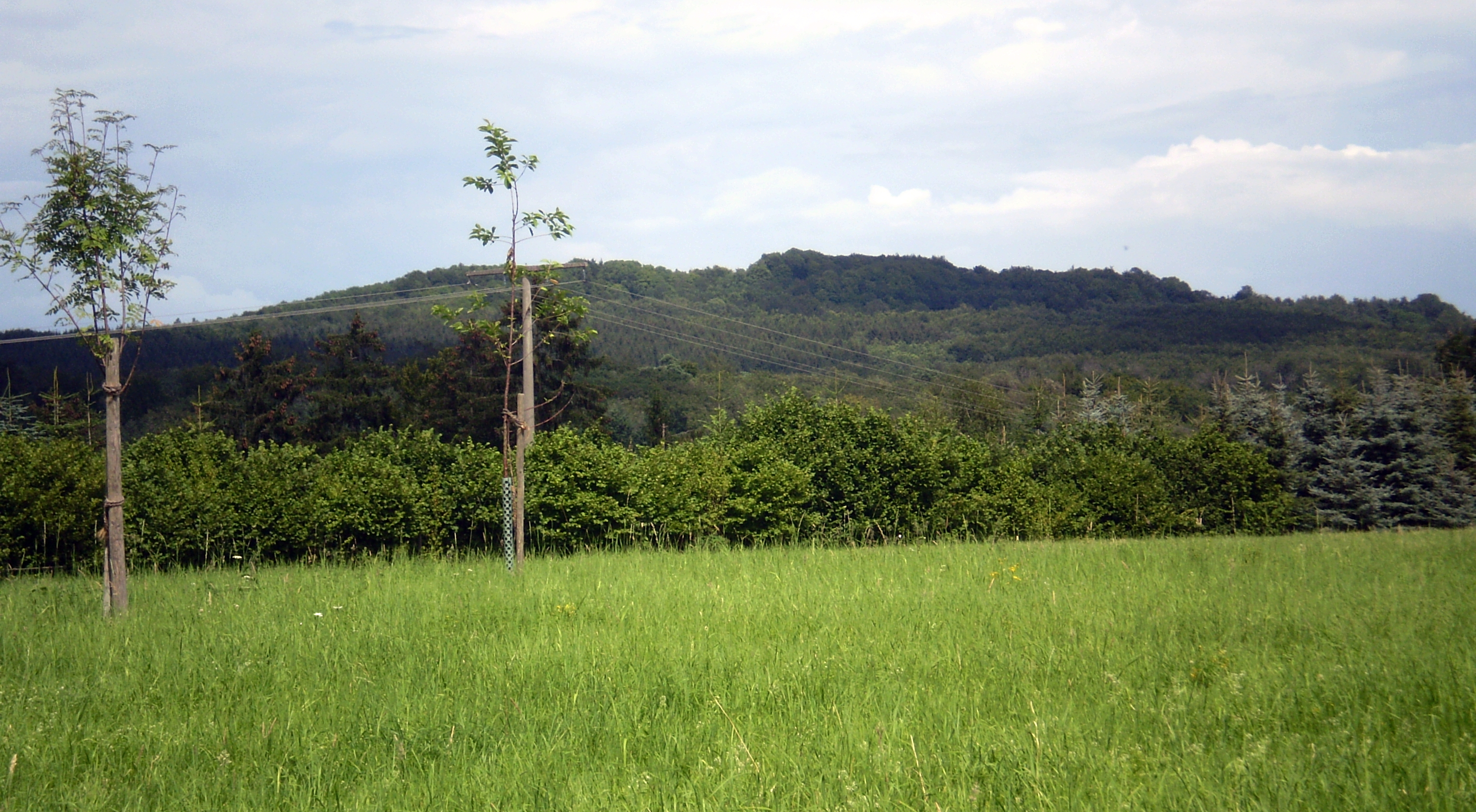
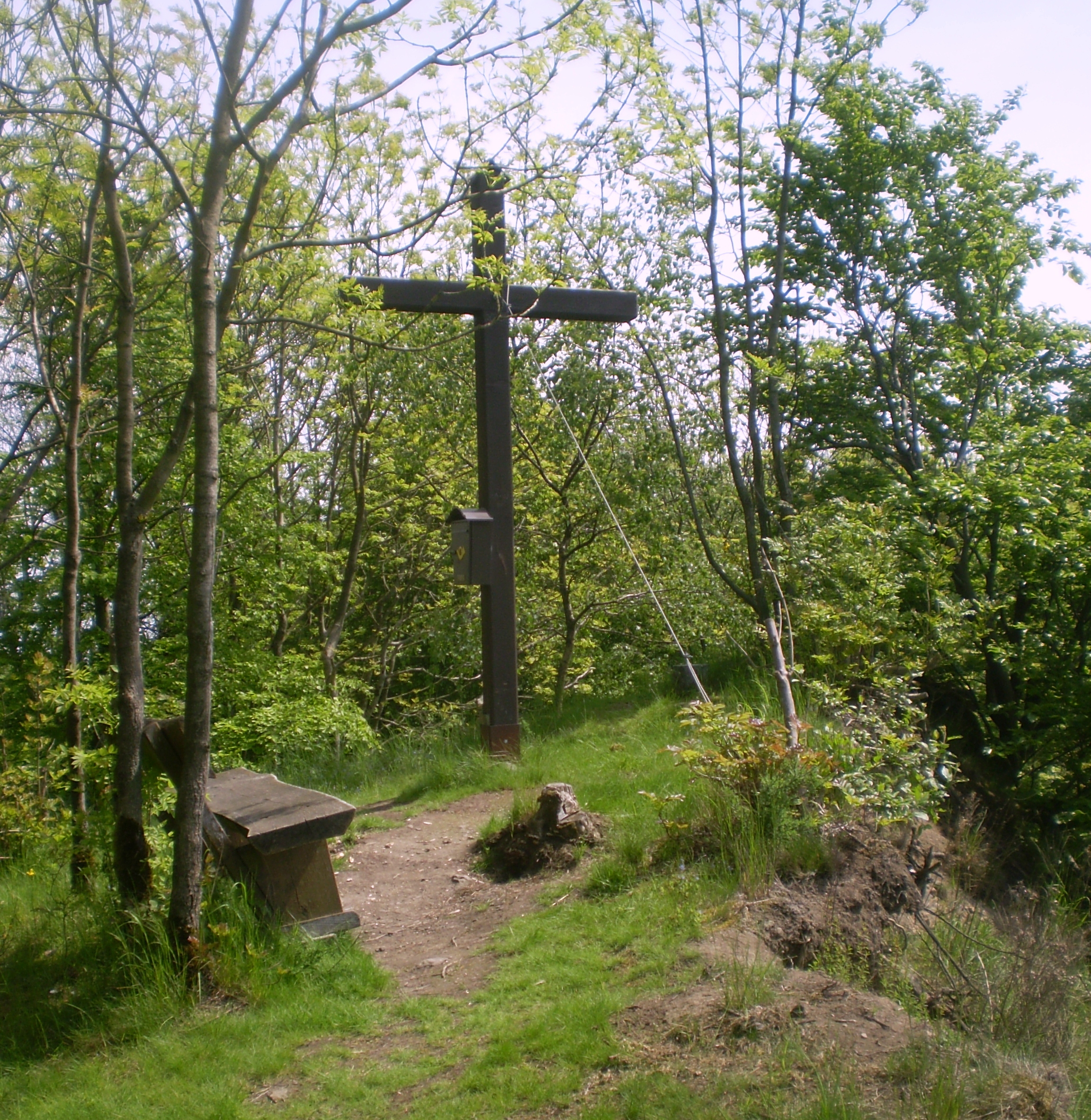
- The Asberg seen from the Birkig Summit of the Asberg Summit of the Asberg

Highest point
- Elevation: 441 m above sea level (NHN) (1,446.9 ft)
- Coordinates: 50°37′31″N 7°17′46″E

Geography
- Location within Rhineland-Palatinate
- Parent range: Rheinwesterwald Volcanic Ridge, Niederwesterwald

Geology
- Rock type: basalt

The Asberg is a hill, 441 m above sea level (NHN), on the Rheinwesterwald Volcanic Ridge on the northern edge of the Linz Heights (Linzer Höhe). Until the 1970s it was the site of a basalt quarry.

== Geography ==
The Asberg lies in the east of the borough of Unkel (central section and summit) and the municipalities of Rheinbreitbach (northern section) and Erpel (southern section) and is highest point of each district. The stumpy dome (kuppe) of the Asberg rises above the surrounding plateau of the volcanic ridge by around 80 metres. Three flooded pits, with a total area of two hectares, are distributed over a distance of 500 metres to the west and east of the summit, the easternmost and largest lake containing zones of silting.

== Literature ==
- Jürgen Fuchs: Basalt vom Asberg. In: Heimat-Jahrbuch des Landkreises Neuwied 2008, ISBN 978-3-935690-61-4, S. 231–236.
