= Unkel (Verbandsgemeinde) =

Municipality in Rhineland-Palatinate, Germany

- Verbandsgemeinde
- Location of Unkel within Neuwied district
- Interactive map of Unkel
- Location within Germany Location within Rhineland-Palatinate
- Coordinates: 50°36′N 7°13′E
- Country: Germany
- State: Rhineland-Palatinate
- District: Neuwied
- Seat: Unkel
- Subdivisions: 4 municipalities

Area
  - Total: 26.53 km^{2} (10.24 sq mi)

Population (2025-12-31)
  - Total: 12,900
  - Density: 486/km^{2} (1,260/sq mi)
- Time zone: UTC+01:00 (CET)
  - Summer (DST): UTC+02:00 (CEST)
- Website: www.vgvunkel.de

Unkel is a Verbandsgemeinde ("collective municipality") in the district of Neuwied, in Rhineland-Palatinate, Germany. The seat of the Verbandsgemeinde is in Unkel.

The Verbandsgemeinde Unkel consists of the following Ortsgemeinden ("local municipalities"):

1. Bruchhausen
2. Erpel
3. Rheinbreitbach
4. Unkel
