= Sengenau =

Sengenau is a locality in the municipality Sankt Katharinen in the district of Neuwied in Rhineland-Palatinate, Germany.
