= Rheinbreitbach =

- Municipality
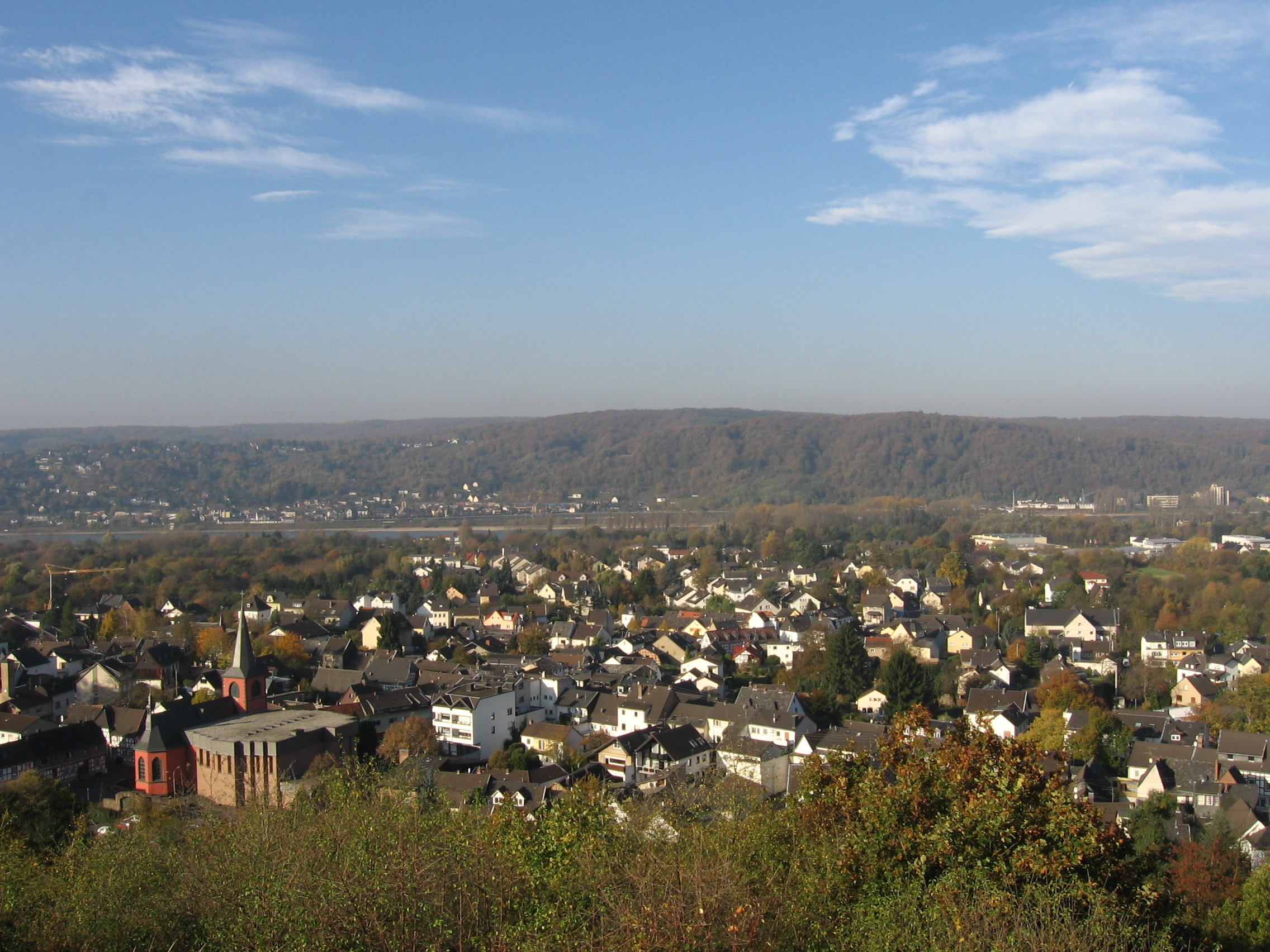

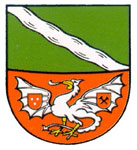
- Coat of arms

- Location of Rheinbreitbach within Neuwied district
- Interactive map of Rheinbreitbach
- Location within Germany Location within Rhineland-Palatinate
- Coordinates: 50°37′13″N 7°13′51″E
- Country: Germany
- State: Rhineland-Palatinate
- District: Neuwied
- Municipal assoc.: Unkel

Government
  - Mayor (2019–24): Roland Thelen (CDU)

Area
  - Total: 6.58 km^{2} (2.54 sq mi)
- Elevation: 75 m (246 ft)

Population (2025-12-31)
  - Total: 4,388
  - Density: 667/km^{2} (1,730/sq mi)
- Time zone: UTC+01:00 (CET)
  - Summer (DST): UTC+02:00 (CEST)
- Postal codes: 53619
- Dialling codes: 02224
- Vehicle registration: NR
- Website: www.rheinbreitbach.de

Rheinbreitbach is a municipality in the district of Neuwied, in north of Rhineland-Palatinate, bordering North Rhine-Westphalia in Germany. Administratively it belongs to the municipality (Verbandsgemeinde) of Unkel. The town is an officially recognized Fremdenverkehrsort (touristic locality).

== Geography ==
Rheinbreitbach is located at the north end of the Middle Rhine and at the southern edge of the Siebengebirge. As a whole it is part of the Rhine Westerwald Volcanic Ridge (Rheinwesterwälder Vulkanrücken). The dimensions of its territory are approximately 7 (east–west) by 2 kilometres, its highest point is 375 m, near the summit of the Asberg. Most of the 6,58 km^{2} area is forested (56.6%) and only a small portion is used agriculturally (8.5%).

== History ==
The town, presumably founded in Frankish times is first mentioned in official documents in 966 under the name Breitenbach, but finds of coins dated from 150 to 350 AD near the mining operation Virneberg (or Firneberg) shows Roman presence in the region, presumably mining copper. In the Middle Ages the town was surrounded by a wall and moat and sported four fortified gates. The town is first called "Rheinbreitbach" in 1604.

=== Mining ===
The mining of copper-ore and subsequent extraction of the copper is attested by various finds since mediaeval times in near the Virneberg, in Breite Heide. In 1604, one Bartholomäus Brück reopens the royal copper mines. In 1720 the complex had nearly a kilometer of shafts, and in 1744 eighty employees are registered. In this time the mine is renamed St. Jozefsstollen. In 1756 a document mentions the use of 8000 pounds of Breitbacher kupfer to cast the bells of the Bonn Minster. The mines are visited by a young Alexander von Humboldt during a study trip in 1789. In 1794 production was temporarily halted, but a new shaft, started in 1800 to a depth of 85 meters rendered the mine productive again. In 1840 the 51 miners produced 8500 tons of ore. In 1867 production came to a standstill once again at a depth of 138 meters. Another new shaft was drilled in 1870 reaching a depth of 255 meters, 117 meters below the Rhine, in 1880 but the operation was abandoned in 1886.

=== Viticulture ===
Apart from mining, viticulture was a large part of the local economy. The first vineyard to be mentioned is that of Kloster Rolandswerth, the current Nonnenwerth in 1143. The monasteries of Marienstatt and Schwarz-Rheindorf also grew wine here, as did the churches of St. Aposteln, St. Severin, St. Maria ad Gradus, St. Gereon and St. Martin. Also the local gentry, the, Freiherrn von Breidbach and even the Counts of Berg owned vineyards here.

The populace was employed on these estates as tenants, the so-called halfen, who owed half or a third of the produce to their landlords, the clergy and the nobility. To prevent the stealing of grapes, special Traubenhüter (grape guards) were employed by the community. In 1661 110 vineyards are registered. The year 1889 is still remembered as a top year, grossing an estimated 100,000 Marks. In the 20th century, however, viticulture in the community went into decline due to infestations of Reblaus. Currently there are no vineyards in Rheinbreitbach.

== See also ==
- Breite Heide, a locality of Rheinbreitbach
