= Stephan Fahrig =

German rower

Personal information
- Born: 20 November 1968 Unkel
- Died: 23 January 2017 (aged 48)
- Occupation: Sports scientist
- Height: 183 cm (6 ft 0 in)

Sport
- Sport: Rowing
- Club: RTHC Bayer Leverkusen
Medal record
Men's rowing
World Rowing Championships
Representing West Germany
Gold medal – first place	1989 Bled	Lwt men's four
Gold medal – first place	1990 Tasmania	Lwt men's four
Representing Germany
Bronze medal – third place	1992 Montreal	Lwt men's quad sculls
Bronze medal – third place	1993 Račice	Lwt men's pair
Bronze medal – third place	1994 Indianapolis	Lwt men's four

Stephan Fahrig (20 November 1968 – 23 January 2017) was a German lightweight rower and a sports scientist.

Fahrig was born in 1968 in Unkel in West Germany. He took up rowing aged 14 and over his career, he won 15 national titles. Initially rowing for WSV Bad Honnef, he later changed to RTHC Bayer Leverkusen. He attended all World Rowing Championships between 1988 and 1995. He was regarded as a leader among his rowing colleagues, had a disciplined training regime, and an aim for perfection.

At the 1988 World Rowing Championships in Milan, he competed with the lightweight men's eight and came fourth. He won a gold medal at the 1989 World Rowing Championships in Bled with the lightweight men's four. He retained his world championship title with the lightweight men's four at the 1990 World Rowing Championships in Tasmania.

After the German reunification, he competed at the 1991 World Rowing Championships with the lightweight men's four in Vienna and came sixth. At the 1992 World Rowing Championships in Montreal, he won bronze with the lightweight men's quad scull. Changing back to sweep rowing, he competed at the 1993 World Rowing Championships in Račice in the lightweight men's pair, and he won a bronze medal together with Herbert Vogt. At the 1994 World Rowing Championships in Indianapolis, he competed with the lightweight men's four and won bronze. His final international competition was the 1995 World Rowing Championships, where he came fourth with the lightweight men's eight.

In 2010, he obtained a doctorate in sports science, with the title of his thesis "Interaktionsproblematik im Riemenzweier der Sportart Rudern" (Problematic of the interaction of paired sweep rowers in the sport of rowing). He lived in Berlin, where he was distribution manager for medical equipment and competed in cycling. He died in 2017 from leukemia.
