= Linz am Rhein (Verbandsgemeinde) =

- Verbandsgemeinde
- Location of Linz am Rhein within Neuwied district
- Interactive map of Linz am Rhein
- Location within Germany Location within Rhineland-Palatinate
- Coordinates: 50°34′N 7°17′E
- Country: Germany
- State: Rhineland-Palatinate
- District: Neuwied
- Seat: Linz am Rhein
- Subdivisions: 7 municipalities

Area
  - Total: 64.72 km^{2} (24.99 sq mi)

Population (2025-12-31)
  - Total: 18,978
  - Density: 293.2/km^{2} (759.5/sq mi)
- Time zone: UTC+01:00 (CET)
  - Summer (DST): UTC+02:00 (CEST)
- Website: www.vg-linz.de

Linz am Rhein is a Verbandsgemeinde ("collective municipality") in the district of Neuwied, in Rhineland-Palatinate, Germany. The seat of the eponymously named Verbandsgemeinde is in the town of Linz am Rhein.

The Verbandsgemeinde Linz am Rhein consists of the following Ortsgemeinden ("local municipalities"):

1. Dattenberg
2. Kasbach-Ohlenberg
3. Leubsdorf
4. Linz am Rhein
5. Ockenfels
6. Sankt Katharinen
7. Vettelschoß
