= Steinshardt =

Coordinates: 50°35′N 7°23′E

Steinshardt is a locality in the municipality Sankt Katharinen in the district of Neuwied in Rhineland-Palatinate, Germany.
