= Unkel =

- Town
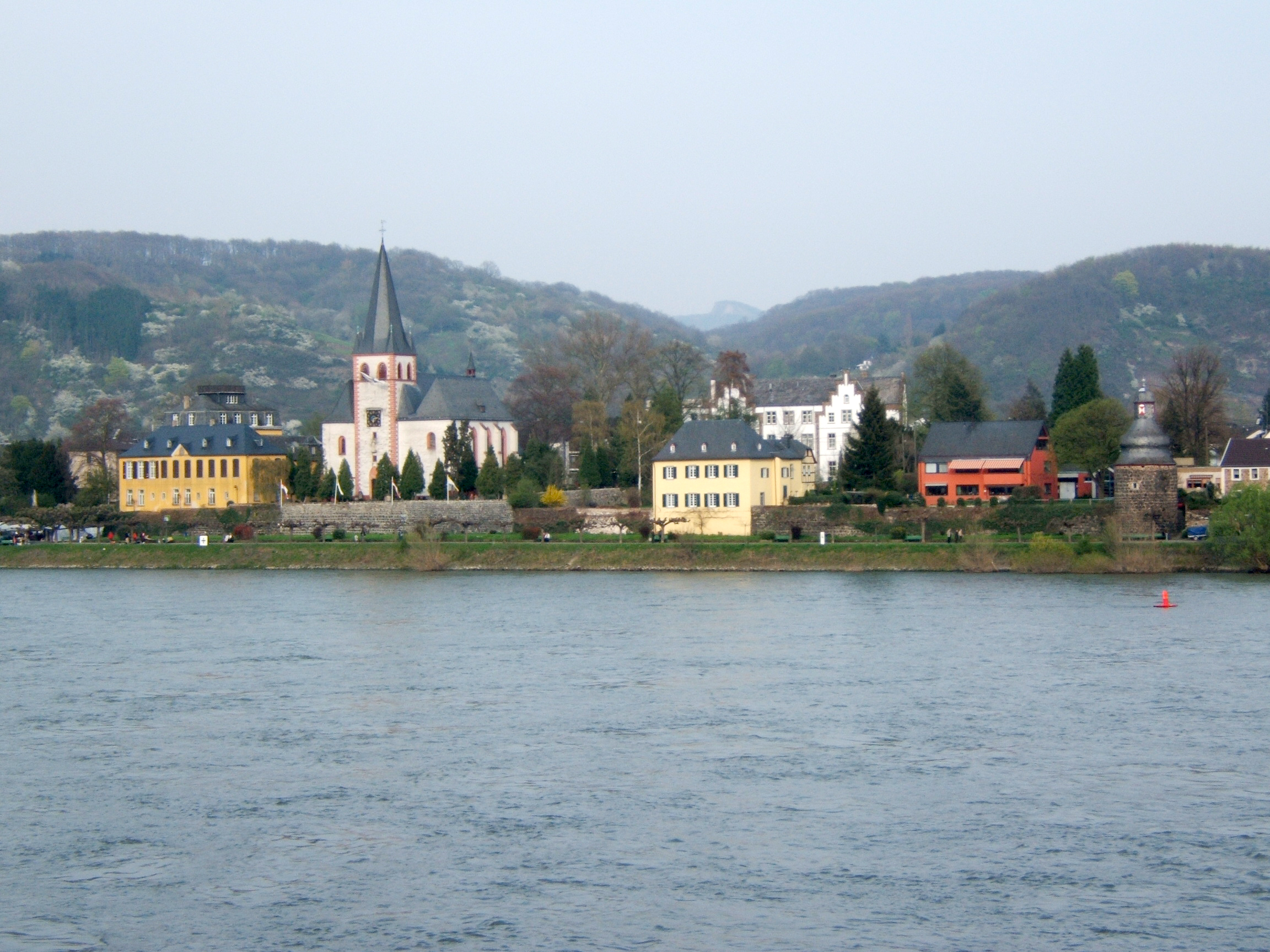
- Unkel seen from the left bank of the Rhine

- Coat of arms

- Location of Unkel within Neuwied district
- Interactive map of Unkel
- Location within Germany Location within Rhineland-Palatinate
- Coordinates: 50°36′03″N 07°12′54″E
- Country: Germany
- State: Rhineland-Palatinate
- District: Neuwied
- Municipal assoc.: Unkel
- Subdivisions: 3

Government
  - Mayor (2024–2029): Alfons Mußhoff (CDU)

Area
  - Total: 8.16 km^{2} (3.15 sq mi)
- Elevation: 56 m (184 ft)

Population (2025-12-31)
  - Total: 5,008
  - Density: 614/km^{2} (1,590/sq mi)
- Time zone: UTC+01:00 (CET)
  - Summer (DST): UTC+02:00 (CEST)
- Postal codes: 53572
- Dialling codes: 02224
- Vehicle registration: NR
- Website: www.unkel.de (in English)

Unkel (German pronunciation: [ˈʊŋkl̩]) is a town in the district of Neuwied, in Rhineland-Palatinate, Germany. It is situated on the right bank of the Rhine, near Remagen, about 20 km southeast of Bonn.

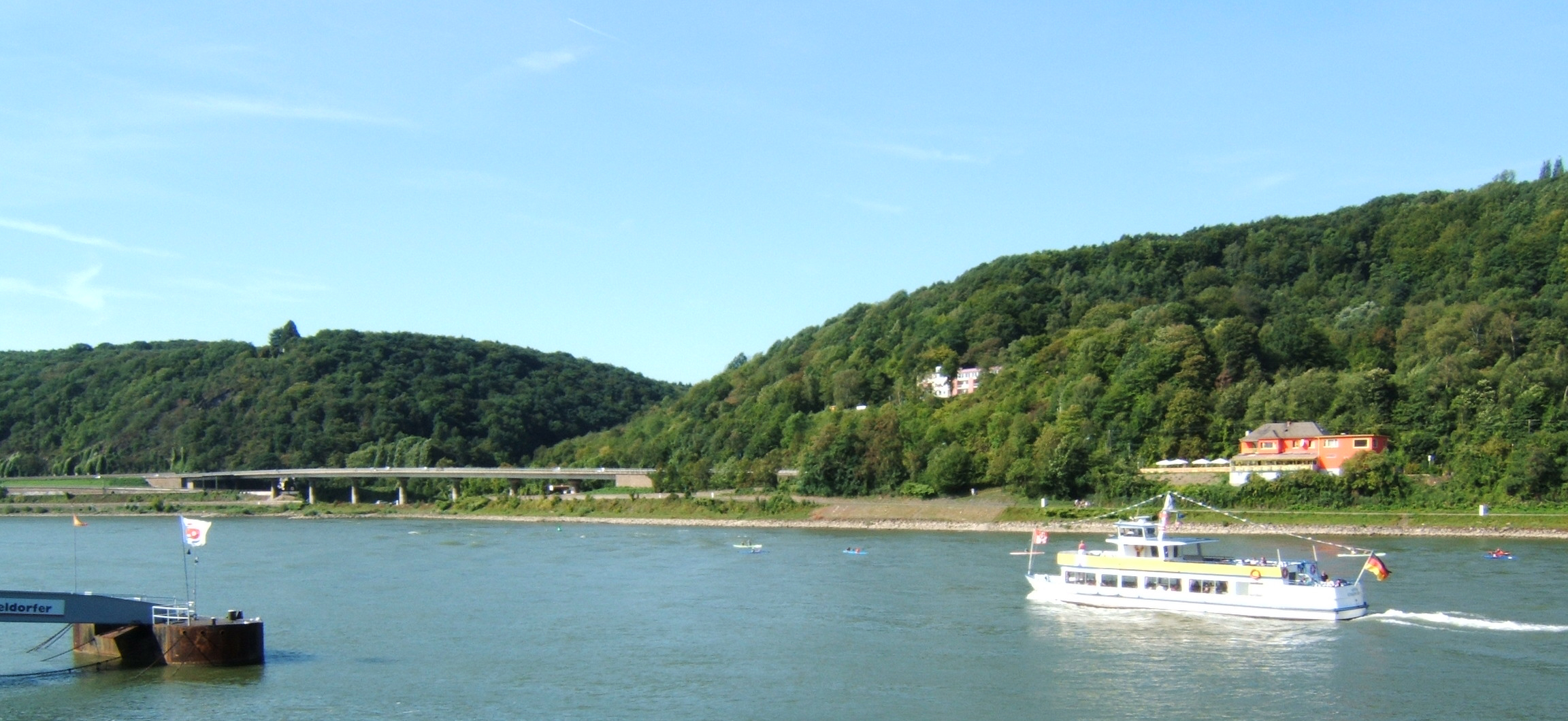
Rhine in Unkel, view towards Remagen

Unkel is the seat of the Verbandsgemeinde ("collective municipality") Unkel.

== Religion ==
Unkel is mainly Roman Catholic. Approximately 55% of the inhabitants are Roman Catholic, and 15% Protestant. 18% of the residents do not belong to a religious denomination, 8% are Muslim.

== Geography ==
=== Location ===
The town is located at the edge of the Rhine-Westerwald Nature Park in the middle of the Rhine Valley, its centre is about 4 km away from the border to North Rhine-Westphalia.

=== Neighbouring settlements ===
Unkel is surrounded from north to south by the settlements of Rheinbreitbach, Bruchhausen, Windhagen, Linz, Erpel, and Remagen.

=== Subdivisions ===
Unkel has three subdistricts: Unkel, Scheuren and Heister.

== Sights ==
The most important sight is the "Freiligrathaus", which is located at the Rhine promenade. It is a baroque palace, built in 1760. Ferdinand Freiligrath lived there from 1839 until 1841.

The rich-featured Catholic parish church "St. Pantaleon" accommodates a feretory (a receptacle for the relics of saints). Additionally, most of the old town wall is well preserved.

The Willy Brandt Forum offers an exhibition and program on the life and legacy of Willy Brandt. The longtime resident ranks among Germany's principal politicians of the twentieth century. He opposed Nazism in exile, served as Chancellor and received the Nobel Peace Prize.

== Twin town ==
- Kamen, Germany
- Ushuaia, Argentina

== Famous residents ==
- Stefan Andres, author of the novella We Are Utopia.
- Konrad Adenauer (1876–1967), who became first Chancellor of West Germany, found refuge in Unkel during the time of national socialism.
- Willy Brandt (1913–1992), former Chancellor of Germany, spent the last years of his life, from 1979 until 1992, in Unkel. Many famous politicians visited him there, like Helmut Kohl and Mikhail Gorbachev. The market place is named after him.
- Stephan Fahrig (1968–2017), lightweight rower and a sports scientist
- Ferdinand Freiligrath (1810–1876), a German writer, started his literary career in Unkel. The house he lived in is now called Freiligrathhaus.
- Fritz Henkel (1875–1930), son of Friedrich Karl Henkel (1848–1930), the inventor of Persil (laundry detergent) and founder of the Henkel Company, had his summer home in Unkel. He donated a fire-brigade car and a park, which was named after him.
- Leonhard Reinirkens, a writer, is honorary citizen of Unkel.
- Anne Bierwirth, contralto, was born here.
- Markus Wagner (born 1964), politician
