= Strödt =

Locality in Sankt Katharinen, Rhineland-Palatinate, Germany

Coordinates: 50°36′N 7°22′E

Strödt is a locality in the municipality Sankt Katharinen, in the district of Neuwied in Rhineland-Palatinate, Germany.
