= Breite Heide =

Locality in Rheinbreitbach, Germany

Coordinates: 50.6213°N 7.26079°E

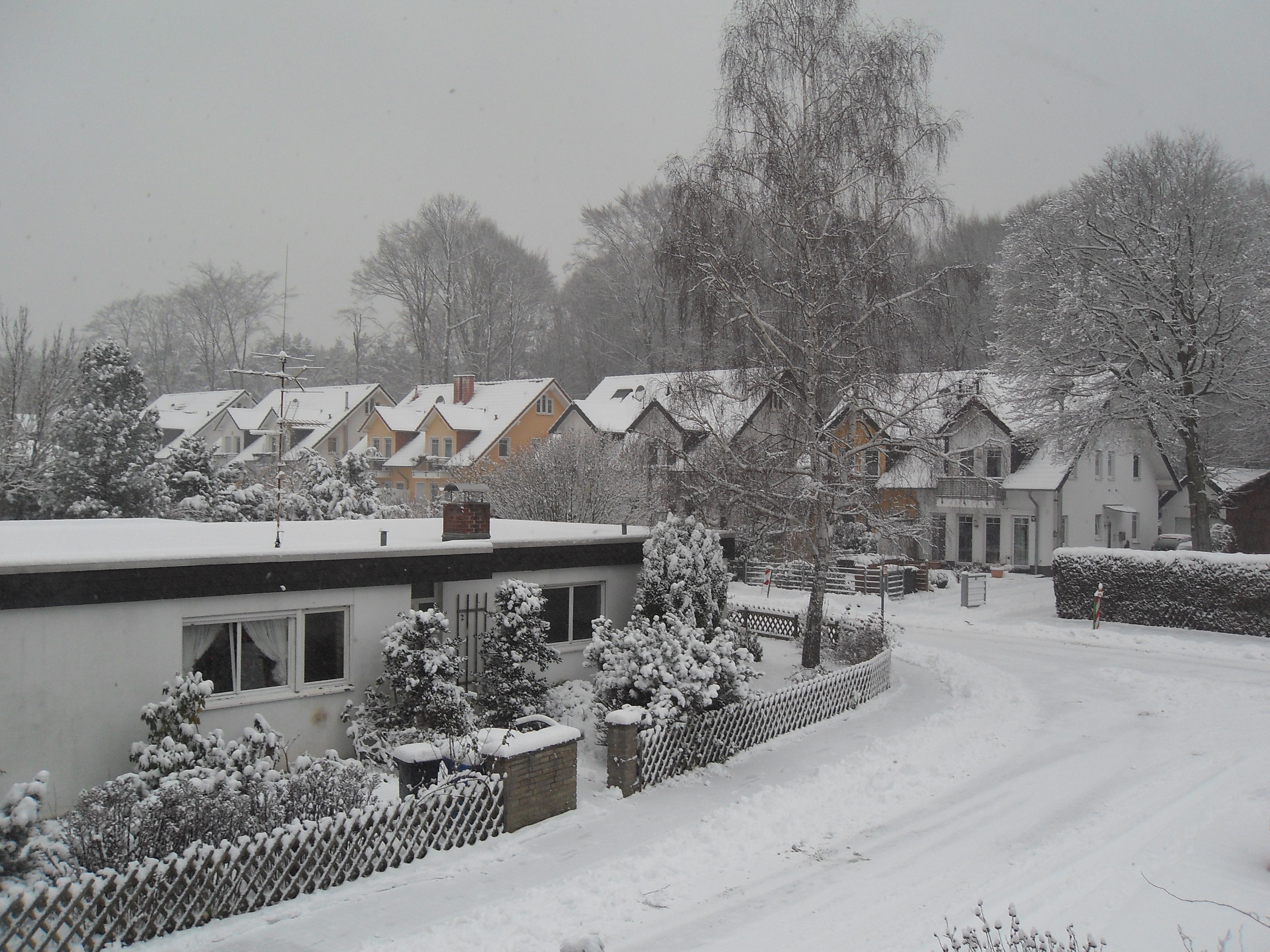
Breite Heide in Winter

Breite Heide is a locality in the municipality Rheinbreitbach in the district of Neuwied in Rhineland-Palatinate, Germany.
