= Dattenberg =

- Municipality
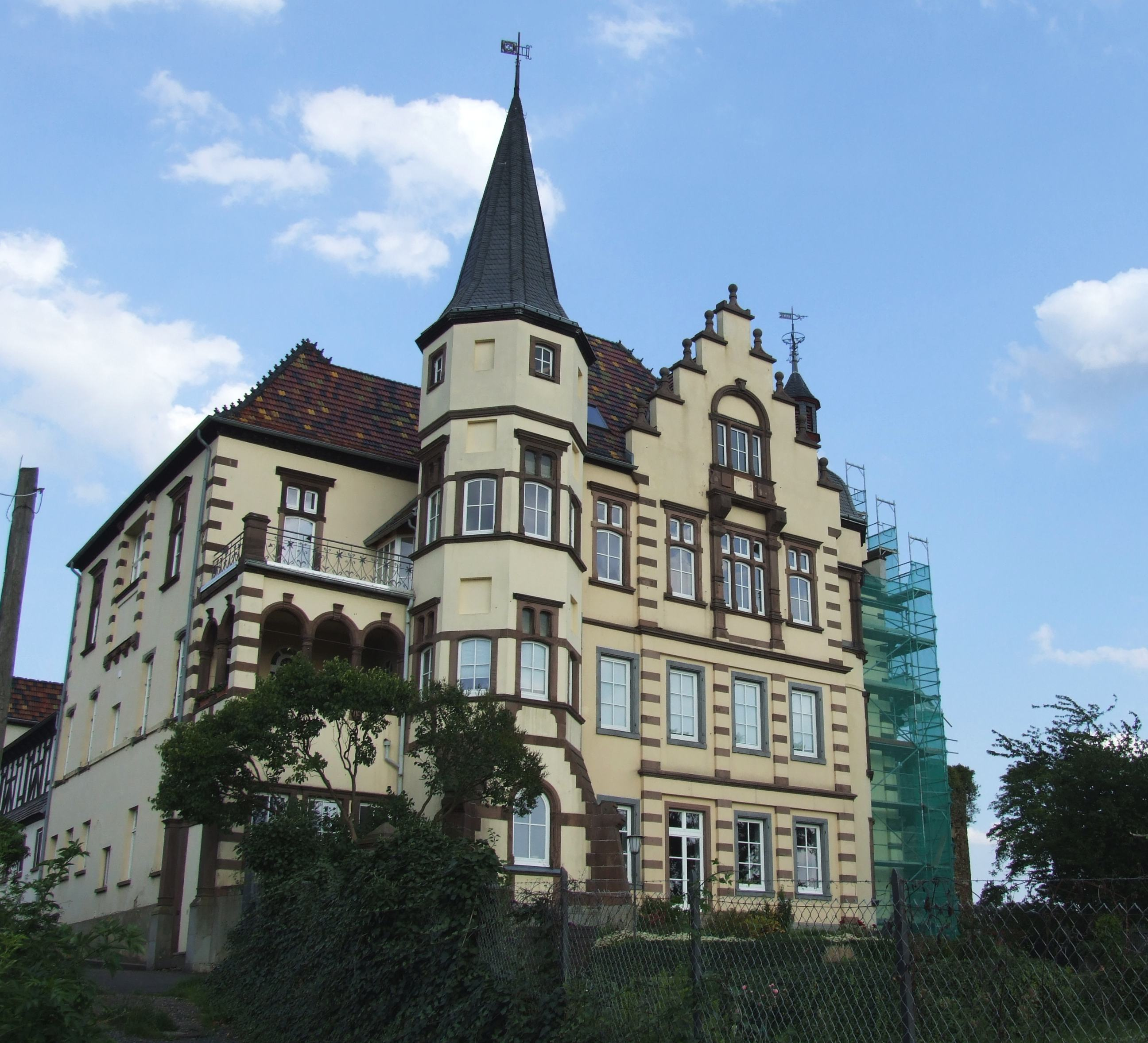
- Landhaus Burg Dattenburg

- Coat of arms

- Location of Dattenberg within Neuwied district
- Interactive map of Dattenberg
- Location within Germany Location within Rhineland-Palatinate
- Coordinates: 50°33′18″N 7°17′39″E
- Country: Germany
- State: Rhineland-Palatinate
- District: Neuwied
- Municipal assoc.: Linz am Rhein
- Subdivisions: 6

Government
  - Mayor (2019–24): Stefan Betzing (CDU)

Area
  - Total: 9.33 km^{2} (3.60 sq mi)
- Elevation: 61–388 m (200–1,273 ft)

Population (2025-12-31)
  - Total: 1,517
  - Density: 163/km^{2} (421/sq mi)
- Time zone: UTC+01:00 (CET)
  - Summer (DST): UTC+02:00 (CEST)
- Postal codes: 53547
- Dialling codes: 02644
- Vehicle registration: NR
- Website: dattenberg.eu

Dattenberg (German pronunciation: [ˈdatn̩bɛʁk]) is a municipality in the district of Neuwied, in Rhineland-Palatinate, Germany.
