= Stefan Andres =

German novelist (1906–1970)

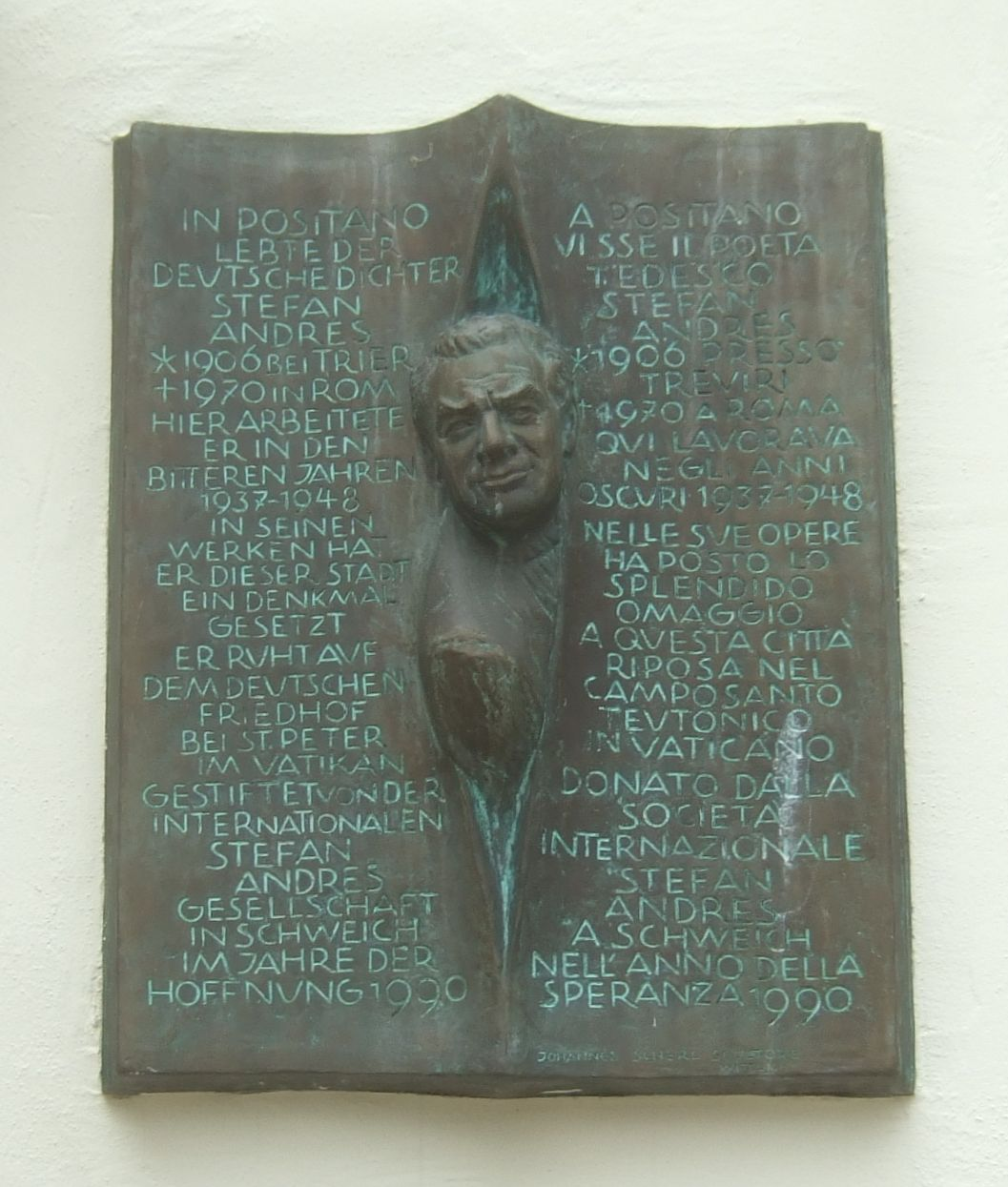
- Born: 26 June 1906; Dhrönchen, Trittenheim, Germany
- Died: 29 June 1970 (aged 64); Rome, Italy
- Occupation: Novelist

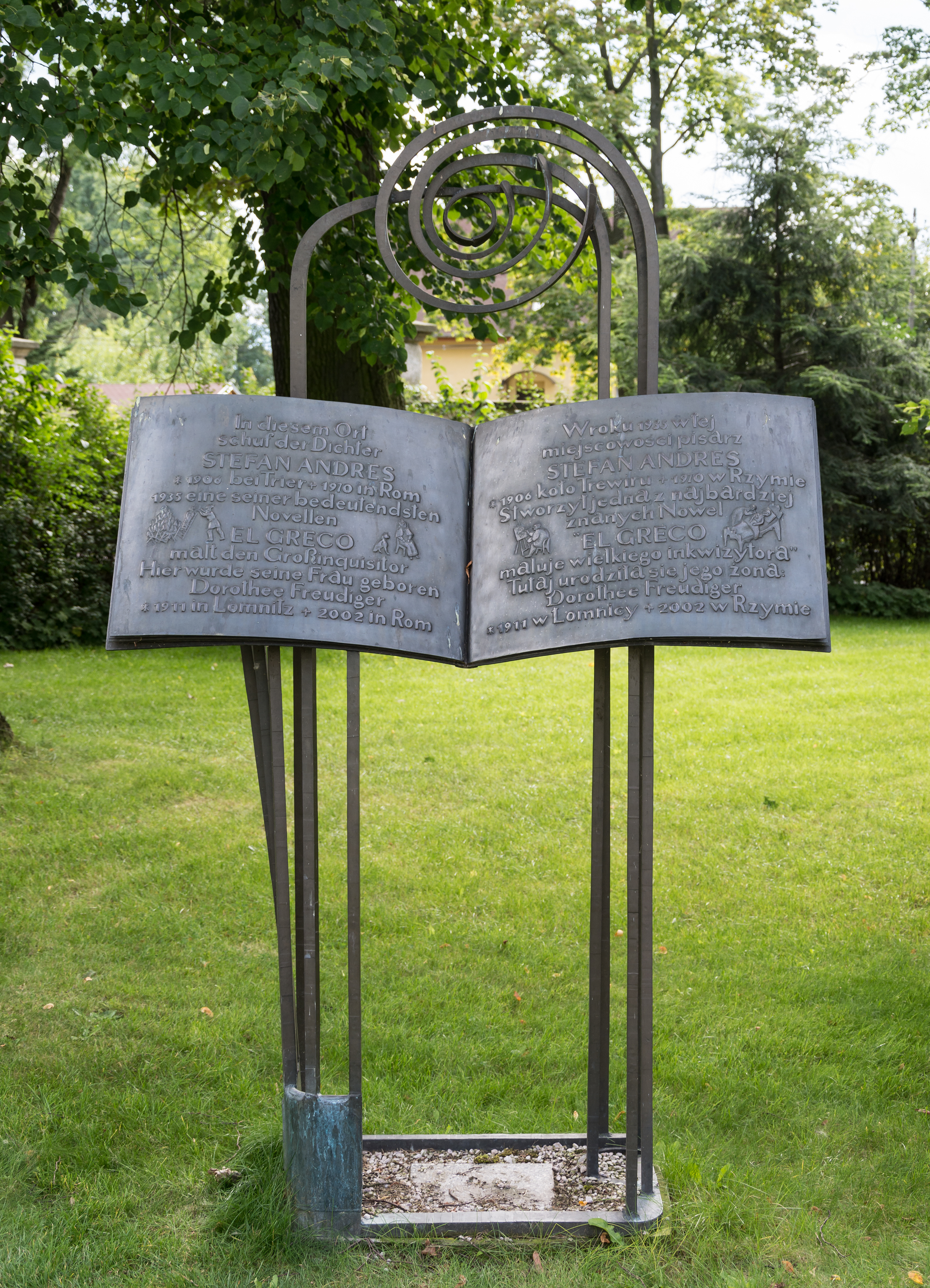
Memorial plaque of Stefan Andres

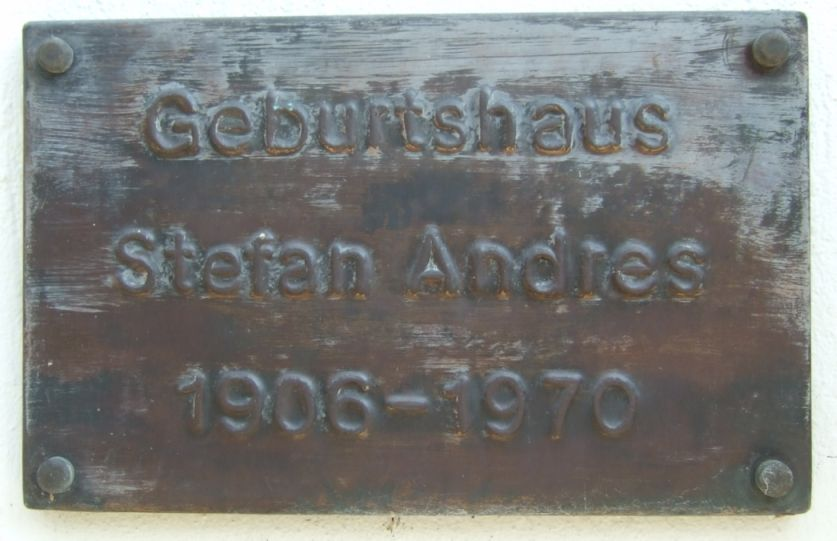
Memorial plaque at the birthplace of Stefan Andres

Stefan Paul Andres (26 June 1906 – 29 June 1970) was a German novelist.

Being opposed to Hitler's regime, Andres moved away to Italy in 1937, returning to Germany 13 years later. He was a widely read German writer in the post-World War II period. His most famous works are the novellas El Greco Paints the Grand Inquisitor (1936) and We Are Utopia (1942).

He was nominated for the Nobel Prize in Literature.

== Works ==
- Bruder Lucifer (1932)
- Eberhard im Kontrapunkt (1933)
- Die Löwenkanzel (1933)
- Die unsichtbare Mauer (1934)
- Vom heiligen Pfäfflein Domenico (1936)
- Utz, der Nachfahr (1936)
- El Greco malt den Großinquisitor* (1936)
- Moselländische Novellen (1937)
- Der Mann von Asteri (1939)
- Das Grab des Neides (1940)
- Der gefrorene Dionysos (1942)
- Wir sind Utopia* (1942)
- Wirtshaus zur weiten Welt (1943)
- Ein Herz wie man braucht (1946)
- Die Söhne Platons (1946)
- Die Hochzeit der Feinde (1947)
- An Freund und Feind (1947)
- Ritter der Gerechtigkeit (1948)
- Tanz durchs Labyrinth (1948)
- Das Tier aus der Tiefe (1949)
- Der Granatapfel (1950)
- Die Arche (1952)
- Der Knabe im Brunnen (1953)
- Die Rache der Schmetterlinge (1953)
- Die Reise nach Portiuncula (1954)
- Positana, Geschichten aus einer Stadt am Meer (1957)
- Der graue Regenbogen (1959)
- Die großen Weine Deutschlands (1961)
- Der Mann im Fisch (1963)
- Die biblische Geschichte* (1965)
- Der Taubenturm (1966)
- Ägyptisches Tagebuch (1967)
- Noah und seine Kinder (1968)
- Die Dumme (1969)
- Die Versuchung des Synesios (1970)

*indicates a work that has been translated into English
