= Trödelsteine (mountain) =

Mountain in Germany

- Location within Rhineland-Palatinate

Highest point
- Elevation: 613 m above sea level (NHN) (2,011.2 ft)
- Listing: Rock formation Trödelsteine
- Coordinates: 50°43′42.1″N 8°2′13.8″E

Geography
- Location: Near Emmerzhausen; Altenkirchen, Rhineland-Palatinate (Germany)
- Parent range: Heller Upland

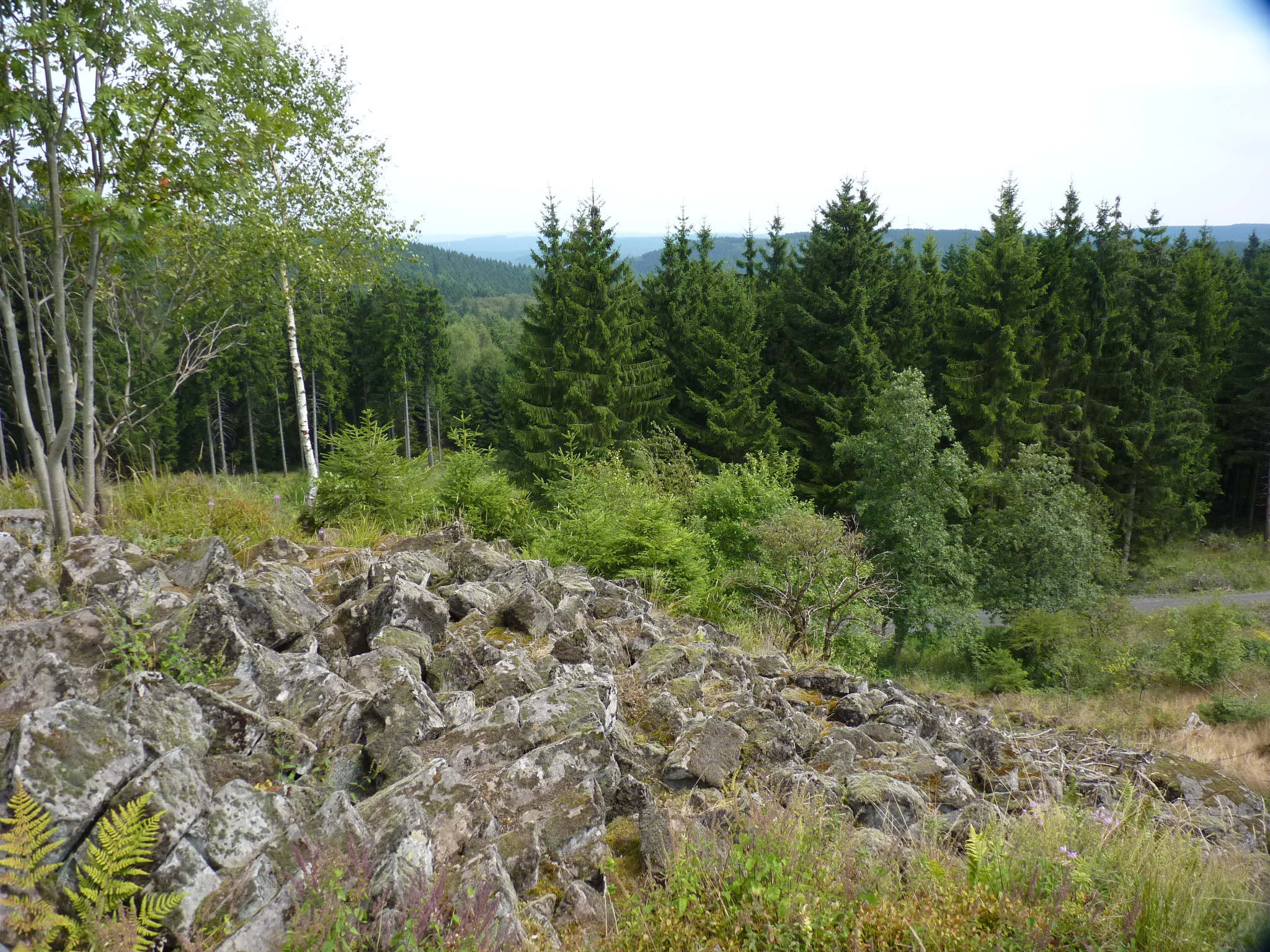
View from the Trödelsteinen looking NE (Aug 2014)

The Trödelsteine is the name of a mountain, 613 m above sea level (NHN), in the Heller Upland near Emmerzhausen in the county of Altenkirchen in the German state of Rhineland-Palatinate and the county of Siegen-Wittgenstein in the state of North Rhine-Westphalia with its summit area in Rhineland-Palatinate.

== Geography ==
=== Location ===
The Trödelsteine lies about 1.2 kilometres northeast of Emmerzhausen, 3.6 km southwest of Burbach and 2.6 km northwest of Lippe, which are both in the neighbouring county of Siegen-Wittgenstein. The state border between Rhineland-Palatinate and North Rhine-Westphalia runs about 50 metres northeast of the summit – roughly along the lower part of the eponymous rock formation. On the Rhineland-Palatinate side a tributary of the Daaderises in the west on an area called Am Zollstock and, on the North Rhine-Westphalian side, the Buchheller tributary, the Nenkersbach, rises in the east. Neighbouring mountains are: to the north, the Nenkersberg (610.3 m) and, to the south-southeast, the Lipper Nürr (616.9 m).

According to the Deutsche Grundkarte, the summit of the Trödelsteine is 613.0 m; on the topographical maps a height of 612.8 m is given.

=== Natural regions ===
The Trödelsteine belongs to the natural region major unit group of the Süder Uplands (no. 33), to the major unit of the Siegerland (331), the subunit of the Heller Upland (331.3) and the natural region of the Southern Heller Upland (331.32).

== The Trödelsteine ==
In the summit region of the mountain are the rocks of the same name, the Trödelsteine, which comprise several basalt crags and, below them, a column and blockfield of feldspar basalt. The rocks are protected as a natural monument.

== Transport and hiking ==
The axis of the Landesstraßen 280 and 911 runs south past the Trödelsteine from Emmerzhausen in Rhineland-Palatinate to Lippe in North Rhine-Westphalia. The E1 European long distance path runs over the mountain, crossing the road at the state border. On the Trödelsteine is a narrow footpath, which is part of the Trödelstein Path (Trödelsteinpfad), a 10.2-kilometre-long branch of the Rothaarsteig. The Heller Ridgeway (Hellerhöhenweg, waymark "H") and the Siegerland High Ring (Siegerland-Höhenring) run over the mountain.
