= Wolfgang Ockenfels =

German Catholic priest, theologian and social ethicist

Wolfgang Ockenfels, OP (born 25 January 1947 in Honnef, West Germany), is a Catholic priest, theologian and professor of social ethics.

== Life ==
In 1967, he joined the order of the Dominicans. Between 1968 and 1974, he studied at the philosophy at the College of the order in Walberberg, later he studied Catholic theology at the University of Bonn, as well as social ethics and economics in Fribourg (Switzerland). After his PhD in 1978, he became an editor of the Catholic conservative weekly newspaper Rheinischer Merkur for three years.

From 1985 to 2015, he was a professor for Christian Social Ethics at the University of Trier in West Germany. He was also an advisor to the papal council "Iustitia et Pax" in Rome.

Since 1992, he is editor-in-chief of the Christian journal Die Neue Ordnung. He frequently writes for the Catholic newspaper Die Tagespost. Ockenfels has edited many books on ethics, theology and politics. He received several awards, among them the Joseph-Höffner-Prize. Since 2018, he sits on the advisory council of the Desiderius-Erasmus-Stiftung, a foundation close to the Alternative for Germany party (AfD). He is a member of the Christian Democratic Union of Germany (CDU), but critical of chancellor Angela Merkel.

== Books and publications ==
- Ockenfels, Wolfgang (1980). Gewerkschaften und Staat : zur Reformdiskussion des Deutschen Gewerkschaftsbundes (in German). Walberberg: Institut für Gesellschaftswissenschaften Walberberg. ISBN 3-922183-00-X. OCLC 6852682.
- Ockenfels, Wolfgang (1985). Wohin steuern die Gewerkschaften? kritische Anfragen an den DGB (in German). Köln. ISBN 978-3-7616-0799-2. OCLC 75781849.
- Ockenfels, Wolfgang (2009). Das hohe C wohin steuert die CDU? (in German). Augsburg. ISBN 978-3-86744-111-7. OCLC 444872962.
- Ockenfels, Wolfgang (2011). Was kommt nach dem Kapitalismus? (in German). Augsburg. ISBN 978-3-86744-177-3. OCLC 725116872.
