= Leubsdorf =

- Municipality
- Coat of arms

- Location of Leubsdorf within Neuwied district
- Interactive map of Leubsdorf
- Location within Germany Location within Rhineland-Palatinate
- Coordinates: 50°32′50″N 7°17′35″E
- Country: Germany
- State: Rhineland-Palatinate
- District: Neuwied
- Municipal assoc.: Linz am Rhein

Government
  - Mayor (2023–24): Heiko Glätzner (CDU)

Area
  - Total: 10.22 km^{2} (3.95 sq mi)
- Elevation: 75 m (246 ft)

Population (2025-12-31)
  - Total: 1,615
  - Density: 158.0/km^{2} (409.3/sq mi)
- Time zone: UTC+01:00 (CET)
  - Summer (DST): UTC+02:00 (CEST)
- Postal codes: 53547
- Dialling codes: 02644
- Vehicle registration: NR
- Website: www.leubsdorf-rhein.de

Leubsdorf (German pronunciation: [ˈlɔʏpsdɔʁf]) is a municipality of Rhineland-Palatinate, Germany, in the district of Neuwied.

== Geography ==
The village of Leubsdorf consists of the four parts Leubsdorf, Hesseln, Rothe Kreuz and Krumscheid.

== History ==
First known documents about Leubsdorf date back to 1250. Much older documents of the year 640 are existent under "Lupstorf". The first church in Leubsdorf was built in the 13th century.

== Sightseeing ==
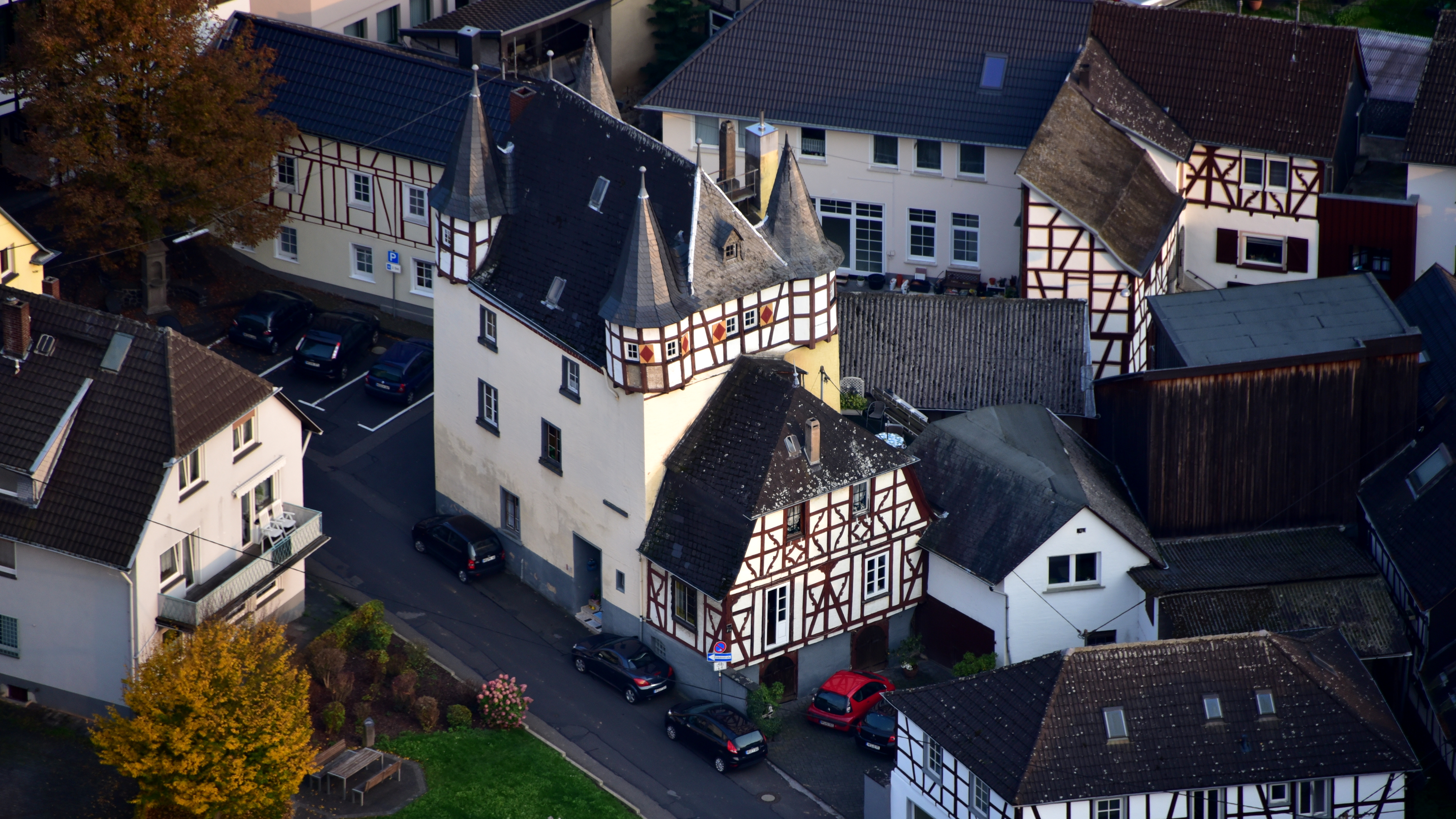
Leubsdorf Castle

Besides the impressive castle many half-timbered houses and old crosses are telling about history. The construction of the castle is to be mentioned in the 13th century. The most important celebration in Leubsdorf is the Walpurgis-Kirmes, which is organized by the Katholischer Junggesellenverein (The Catholic Youth).
