= Leuscheid =

Highest point
- Peak: Hoher Schaden, Beulskopf
- Elevation: 388 m (1,273 ft)

Geography
- State(s): Rhein-Sieg-Kreis, North Rhine-Westphalia, and Altenkirchen, Rhineland-Palatinate
- Range coordinates: 50°44′19″N 7°33′44″E
- Parent range: Mittelsieg Upland and Westerwald

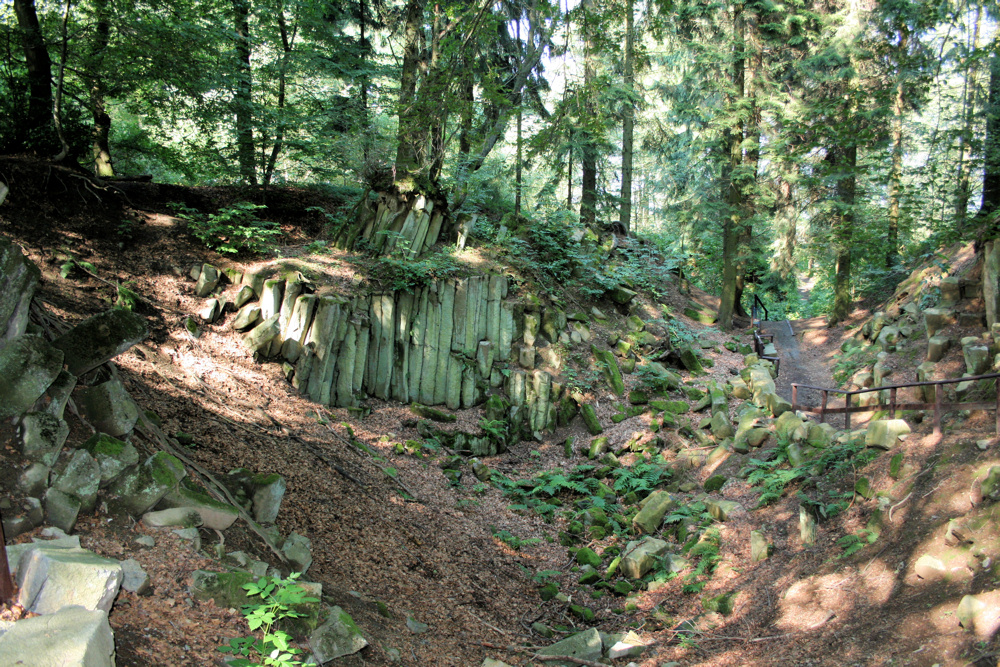
The basalt quarry of Blauer Stein near Kuchhausen

The Leuscheid is a mainly wooded hill ridge on the border between the German states of North Rhine-Westphalia and Rhineland-Palatinate in the extreme north of the Westerwald range. From a natural region perspective, however, it is not seen as part of the Westerwald natural region but belongs to the Mittelsieg Upland (major unit 330) and thus to the Süderbergland (major unit group 33).
