= Ockenfels =

- Municipality
- Coat of arms

- Location of Ockenfels within Neuwied district
- Interactive map of Ockenfels
- Location within Germany Location within Rhineland-Palatinate
- Coordinates: 50°34′43″N 07°16′25″E
- Country: Germany
- State: Rhineland-Palatinate
- District: Neuwied
- Municipal assoc.: Linz am Rhein

Government
  - Mayor (2024–29): Torsten Müller (SPD)

Area
  - Total: 1.66 km^{2} (0.64 sq mi)
- Elevation: 136 m (446 ft)

Population (2025-12-31)
  - Total: 1,037
  - Density: 625/km^{2} (1,620/sq mi)
- Time zone: UTC+01:00 (CET)
  - Summer (DST): UTC+02:00 (CEST)
- Postal codes: 53545
- Dialling codes: 02644
- Vehicle registration: NR
- Website: www.gemeinde-ockenfels.de

Ockenfels (German pronunciation: [ˈɔkn̩fɛls]) is a municipality in the district of Neuwied, in Rhineland-Palatinate, Germany.

Ockenfels lies in the Rhine-Westerwald Nature Park in the North of Rhineland-Palatinate. The municipality was founded in 13th century.
