= Stockum-Püschen =

- Municipality
- Coat of arms

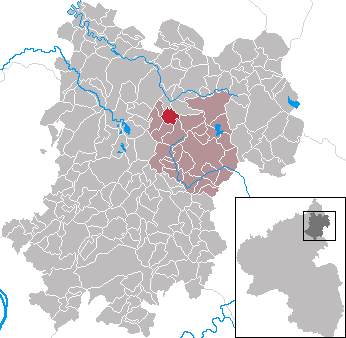
- Location of Stockum-Püschen within Westerwaldkreis district
- Interactive map of Stockum-Püschen
- Location within Germany Location within Rhineland-Palatinate
- Coordinates: 50°36′17″N 7°54′13″E
- Country: Germany
- State: Rhineland-Palatinate
- District: Westerwaldkreis
- Municipal assoc.: Westerburg

Government
  - Mayor (2019–24): Pierre Frank Held

Area
  - Total: 3.54 km^{2} (1.37 sq mi)
- Elevation: 452 m (1,483 ft)

Population (2025-12-31)
  - Total: 644
  - Density: 182/km^{2} (471/sq mi)
- Time zone: UTC+01:00 (CET)
  - Summer (DST): UTC+02:00 (CEST)
- Postal codes: 56459
- Dialling codes: 02661
- Vehicle registration: WW
- Website: www.stockum-pueschen.de

Stockum-Püschen is an Ortsgemeinde – a community belonging to a Verbandsgemeinde – in the Westerwaldkreis in Rhineland-Palatinate, Germany.

== Geography ==
Stockum-Püschen lies on the southern slope of the natural monument, the Götzenberg, 9 km from Westerburg and is an important basalt-mining centre. Since 1972 it has belonged to what was then the newly founded Verbandsgemeinde of Westerburg, a kind of collective municipality. Its seat is in the like-named town.

== History ==
In 1235, Stockum-Püschen had its first documentary mention.

The Ortsgemeinde came into being on 1 January 1969 with the union of the two former municipalities of Stockum and Püschen.

== Politics ==
The municipal council is made up of 13 council members, including the extraofficial mayor (Bürgermeister), who were elected in a majority vote in a municipal election on 13 June 2004.

== Economy and infrastructure ==
There is access to the public transport through the local bus lines 959 and 965. South of the community runs Bundesstraße 255, leading from Montabaur to Herborn. The nearest Autobahn interchange is Montabaur on the A 3 (Cologne–Frankfurt). The nearest InterCityExpress stop is the railway station at Montabaur on the Cologne-Frankfurt high-speed rail line.
