= Bruchhausen =

- Municipality
- Coat of arms

- Location of Bruchhausen within Neuwied district
- Interactive map of Bruchhausen
- Location within Germany Location within Rhineland-Palatinate
- Coordinates: 50°36′14″N 7°15′11″E
- Country: Germany
- State: Rhineland-Palatinate
- District: Neuwied
- Municipal assoc.: Unkel

Government
  - Mayor (2019–24): Markus Fischer (CDU)

Area
  - Total: 2.58 km^{2} (1.00 sq mi)
- Elevation: 200 m (660 ft)

Population (2025-12-31)
  - Total: 957
  - Density: 371/km^{2} (961/sq mi)
- Time zone: UTC+01:00 (CET)
  - Summer (DST): UTC+02:00 (CEST)
- Postal codes: 53572
- Dialling codes: 02224
- Vehicle registration: NR
- Website: www.bruchhausen.net

Bruchhausen (German pronunciation: [bʁʊxˈhaʊzn̩]) is a municipality in the district of Neuwied, in Rhineland-Palatinate, Germany.
