= Salzburger Kopf =

Summit in Rhineland-Palatinate, Germany

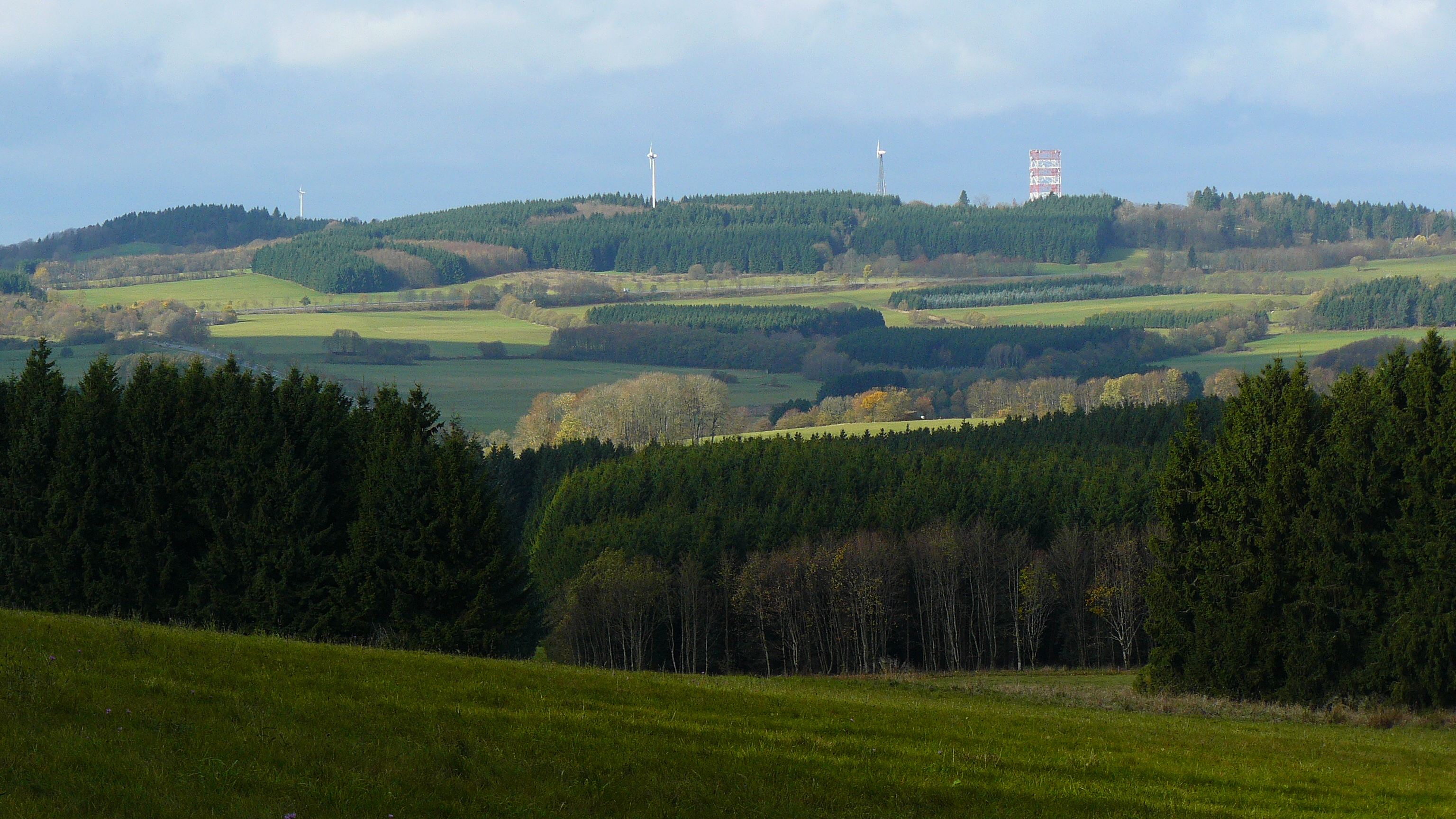
- The Salzburger Kopf with the Galgenberg (left) • View from the Homberg to the SE

Highest point
- Elevation: 654.2 m above sea level (NN) (2,146 ft)
- Listing: third highest summit of the Westerwald
- Coordinates: 50°40′18.5″N 8°3′18″E

Geography
- Location within Rhineland-Palatinate
- Location: Rhineland-Palatinate, Germany
- Parent range: Westerwald

Geology
- Rock type: Basalt

The Salzburger Kopf, at a height of 654.2 m above sea level (NN), is the third highest summit of the Westerwald after the Fuchskaute and the Stegskopf.

The north side of the mountain ridge is almost treeless; in the south strips of woodland alternate with open areas.

The mountain is easily identified by the transmission tower which is in the shape of a red and white, cuboid, steel frame at its summit.

== Geography ==
=== Location ===
The mountain lies 7 km north of Rennerod and 4 km west of the Fuchskaute, immediately by the crossing of the B 414 (south) and B 54 (east) federal roads.
It is framed by the villages of Salzburg to the south, Stein-Neukirch to the north (whose municipal territory runs over the crest), Hof to the west and Bretthausen to the east.

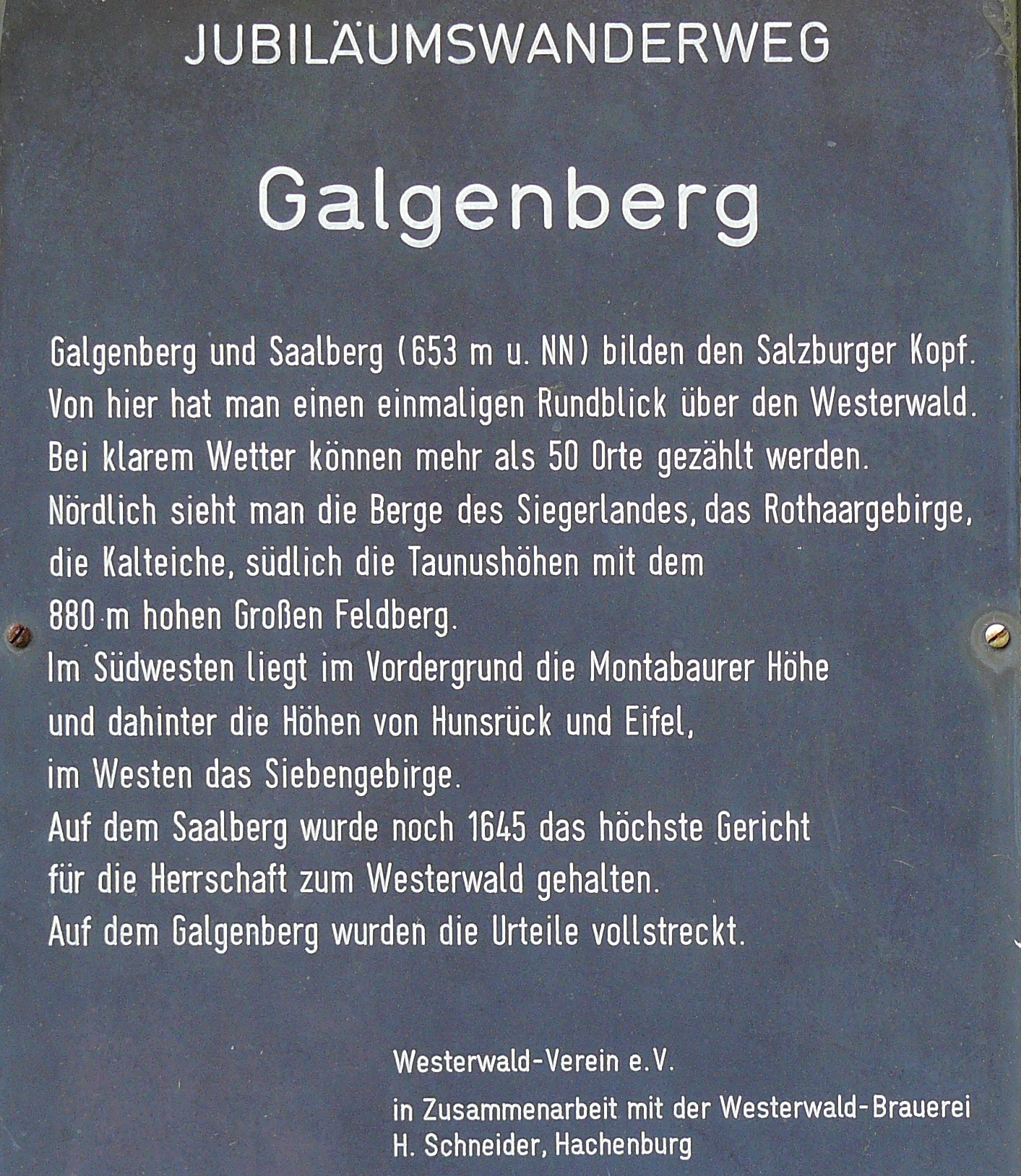
Information board about the Salzburger Kopf on the Galgenberg

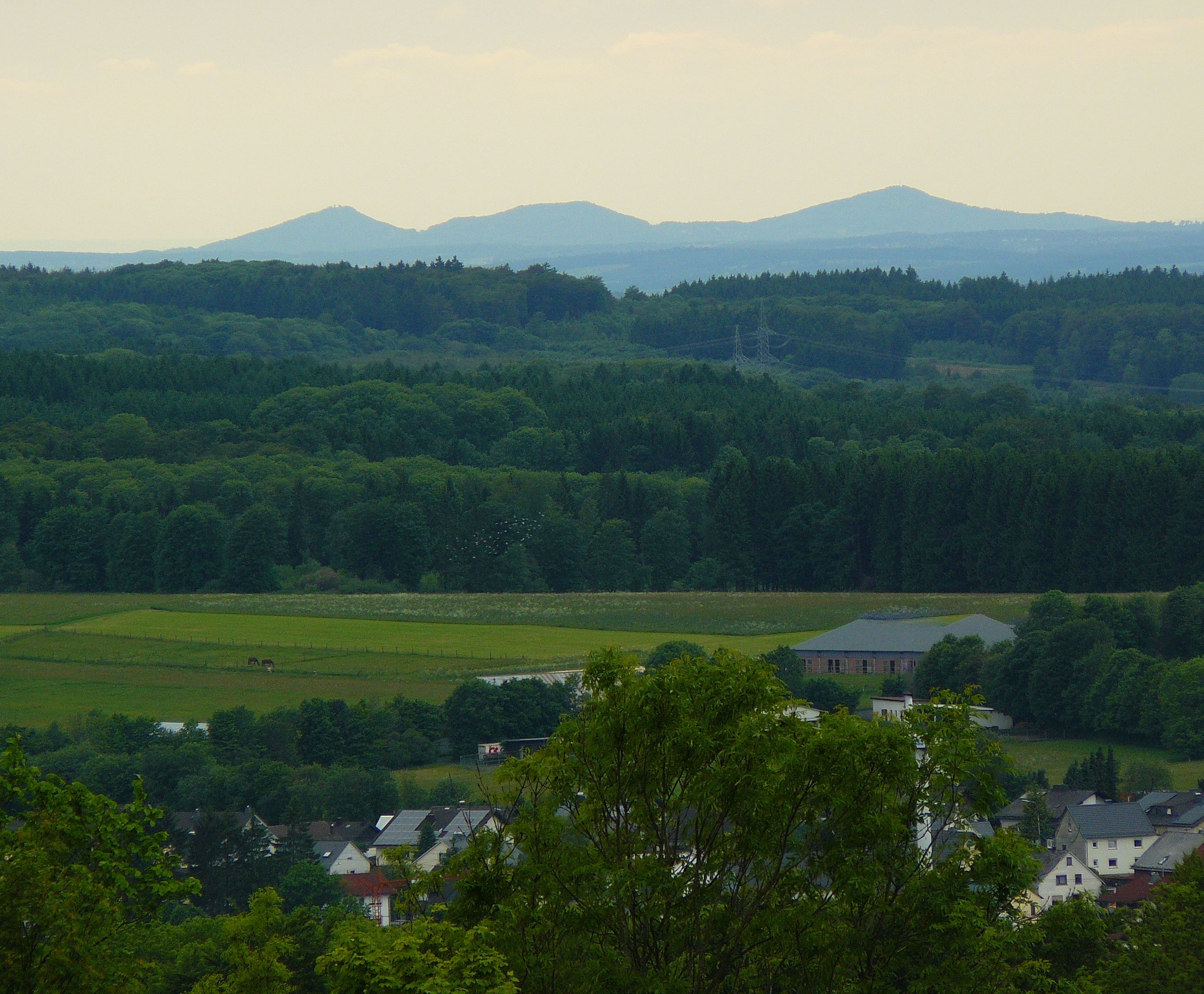
Telescopic view from the Galgenberg looking west to the Siebengebirge

=== Galgenberg ===
In a wider sense, the 649.7-metre high Galgenberg belongs to the Salzburger Kopf. This is where the mountain ridge ends 900 metres to the west-southwest.

The Kreisstraße from Salzburg to Stein runs over the (635 m).

South of the kuppe the Westerwald Club has erected a memorial for those members who fell in the Second World War.

The Galgenberg is notable for outstanding long distance views that open up to the west and south.

=== Watersheds ===
The Salzburger Kopf is part of the watershed between the Dill and Sieg. The waters of the Erlenbach, which rises on its northeast flank, reach the Dill via the Haigerbach. A brook, which rises southeast of the summit, flown into the Sieg tributary, the Nister, 2 km to the east. Another brook, whose source is on the northwest flank of the Galgenberg empties into the Nister tributary, the Black Nister (Schwarze Nister).

== History ==
In 1788, the summit was still the site of the three courts of Marienberg, Emmerichenhain and Neukirch.

The transmission tower was operated by US Forces during the Cold War. Today it is owned by Vodafone.

== Tourism ==
Due to its easy access (from the north) and its extensive views, the mountain is popular with visitors.
It is also the end of a stage for hikers. The main hiking trails, I (Königswinter – Hachenburg – Herborn) and 6 (Burbach – Rennerod – Limburg) of the Westerwald Club, as well as the E1 European long distance path, run along the ridge.

On the eastern mountainside there is a ski piste and lift suitable for beginners and more advanced skiers. Since 2011 a further attraction has been a snowtube facility.
