= Sankt Katharinen =

- Municipality
- Coat of arms

- Location of Sankt Katharinen within Neuwied district
- Interactive map of Sankt Katharinen
- Location within Germany Location within Rhineland-Palatinate
- Coordinates: 50°35′28″N 7°20′35″E
- Country: Germany
- State: Rhineland-Palatinate
- District: Neuwied
- Municipal assoc.: Linz am Rhein
- Subdivisions: 16

Government
  - Mayor (2019–24): Willi Knopp (CDU)

Area
  - Total: 13.84 km^{2} (5.34 sq mi)
- Elevation: 319 m (1,047 ft)

Population (2025-12-31)
  - Total: 3,433
  - Density: 248.0/km^{2} (642.4/sq mi)
- Time zone: UTC+01:00 (CET)
  - Summer (DST): UTC+02:00 (CEST)
- Postal codes: 53562
- Dialling codes: 02645
- Vehicle registration: NR
- Website: www.st-Katharinen.de

Sankt Katharinen (German pronunciation: [zaŋkt kataˈʁiːnən]) is a municipality in the district of Neuwied, in Rhineland-Palatinate, Germany.

== Geography ==
The districts landscape covers the Westerwald mountains, east of the Rhine river valley. The Rhine forms the western boundary of the district.

=== Localities ===
- Ginsterhahn
- Notscheid
- Sengenau
- Steinshardt
- Strödt
