= Stein-Neukirch =

- Municipality
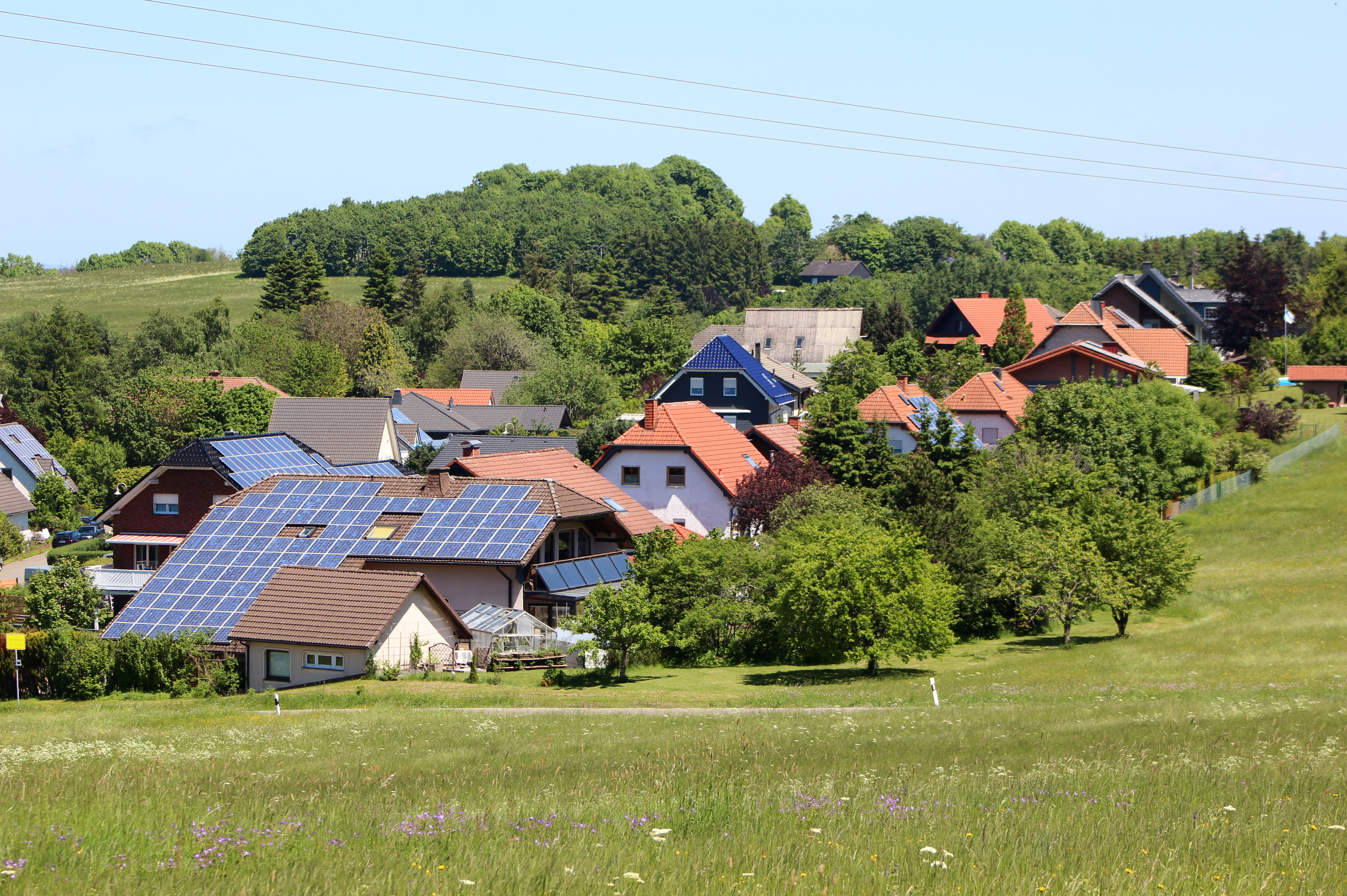

- Coat of arms

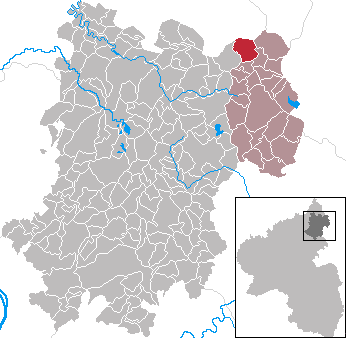
- Location of Stein-Neukirch within Westerwaldkreis district
- Interactive map of Stein-Neukirch
- Location within Germany Location within Rhineland-Palatinate
- Coordinates: 50°40′34″N 8°3′17″E
- Country: Germany
- State: Rhineland-Palatinate
- District: Westerwaldkreis
- Municipal assoc.: Rennerod

Government
  - Mayor (2019–24): Daniel Haas

Area
  - Total: 7.15 km^{2} (2.76 sq mi)
- Elevation: 615 m (2,018 ft)

Population (2025-12-31)
  - Total: 448
  - Density: 62.7/km^{2} (162/sq mi)
- Time zone: UTC+01:00 (CET)
  - Summer (DST): UTC+02:00 (CEST)
- Postal codes: 56479
- Dialling codes: 02667
- Vehicle registration: WW
- Website: www.rennerod.de

Stein-Neukirch is an Ortsgemeinde – a community belonging to a Verbandsgemeinde – in the Westerwaldkreis in Rhineland-Palatinate, Germany.

== Geography ==
The community of Stein-Neukirch lies in the Westerwald between Siegen in the north and Limburg in the south. At 605 m above sea level, it is the Westerwald's highest community. The Stegskopf and Salzburger Kopf are, at 654 m and 653 m respectively, Stein-Neukirch's landmark mountains.

== History ==
The church in the constituent community of Neukirch had its first documented mention in 1231. The "new church" (neue Kirche in German) originally functioned as a fortified church. Later it was the community's ecclesiastical-cultural hub on the high plateau of the Westerwald. In the Middle Ages, Neukirch was a court seat, and formed with the High Westerwald's two other court regions, Marienberg and Emmerichenhain, the "Lordship over the Westerwald", long governed by the House of Nassau.

== Politics ==
=== Community council ===
The council is made up of eight council members, most recently elected in a majority vote in a municipal election on 26 May 2019.

=== Coat of arms ===
The basalt columns in the community's arms stand for the constituent community of Stein (whose name in German means "stone"), and the churches stand for the constituent community of Neukirch, making this an example of canting arms (that is, the charges in the arms suggest the community's name, Stein-Neukirch).

== Regular events ==
Until 2015, the Stein-Neukirch kermis was held on the first weekend of each August. Neukirch Market was very popular in the surrounding area and was celebrated traditionally.

== Economy and infrastructure ==
The local bus lines 463, 477, 480 and 971 connect the village to the public transport, it is located in the area of the transport association Verkehrsverbund Rhein-Mosel (VRM), zone number 457. Bundesstraßen 54, linking Limburg an der Lahn with Siegen, and 414, leading from Driedorf-Hohenroth to Hachenburg, cross each other near the community. The nearest Autobahn interchange is Haiger/Burbach on the A 45 (Dortmund–Hanau), some 14 km away. The nearest InterCityExpress stop is the railway station at Montabaur on the Cologne-Frankfurt high-speed rail line.
