= We Are Utopia =

1942 novella by Stefan Andres

- Title page for Wir sind Utopia (1951)
- Author: Stefan Andres
- Original title: Wir sind Utopia
- Translator: Cyrus Brooks (UK); Elita Walker Caspar (US)
- Language: German
- Publisher: Ulrich Riemerschmidt Verlag
- Publication date: 1942
- Publication place: Germany
- English publication date: 1950
- Pages: 91

We Are Utopia (German: Wir sind Utopia), published as We Are God's Utopia in the United States, is a 1942 novella by the German writer Stefan Andres.

== Plot ==
The story is set during the Spanish Civil War and takes place in a monastery transformed into a war prison after the monks were killed. One of the prisoners, Paco, had been a monk at the same monastery 20 years earlier, before he was excommunicated and went to work as a sailor. The lieutenant Pedro, who is responsible for having the monks killed and for planning to execute all the prisoners, struggles with guilt and discusses this with Paco, asking him for absolution.

== Publication ==
The book was published in Germany by Ulrich Riemerschmidt Verlag in 1942, when Stefan Andres lived in exile in Italy with his Jewish wife. Because of his particular situation, Andres has been described as an author who lived in inner emigration abroad. We Are Utopia was published in English in 1950, in a translation by Cyrus Brooks in the United Kingdom and by Elita Walker Caspar, as We Are God's Utopia, in the United States.

Along with the 1936 novella El Greco Paints the Grand Inquisitor, it is Andres' most famous work and became widely read in Germany in the period after World War II. It was adapted into the West German television film Wir sind Utopia, directed by Dagmar Damek and starring Michael König and Alexander Radszun, which premiered on ZDF on 23 February 1987.
