= Erpel =

- Municipality
- Coat of arms

- Location of Erpel within Neuwied district
- Interactive map of Erpel
- Location within Germany Location within Rhineland-Palatinate
- Coordinates: 50°35′07″N 7°14′24″E
- Country: Germany
- State: Rhineland-Palatinate
- District: Neuwied
- Municipal assoc.: Unkel

Government
  - Mayor (2019–24): Günter Hirzmann (CDU)

Area
  - Total: 9.21 km^{2} (3.56 sq mi)
- Elevation: 56 m (184 ft)

Population (2025-12-31)
  - Total: 2,547
  - Density: 277/km^{2} (716/sq mi)
- Time zone: UTC+01:00 (CET)
  - Summer (DST): UTC+02:00 (CEST)
- Postal codes: 53579
- Dialling codes: 02644
- Vehicle registration: NR
- Website: www.erpel.net

Erpel (German pronunciation: [ˈɛʁpl̩]) is a municipality in the district of Neuwied, in Rhineland-Palatinate, Germany.
