= Trödelsteine (rock formation) =

Coordinates: 50°43′42.1″N 8°2′13.8″E

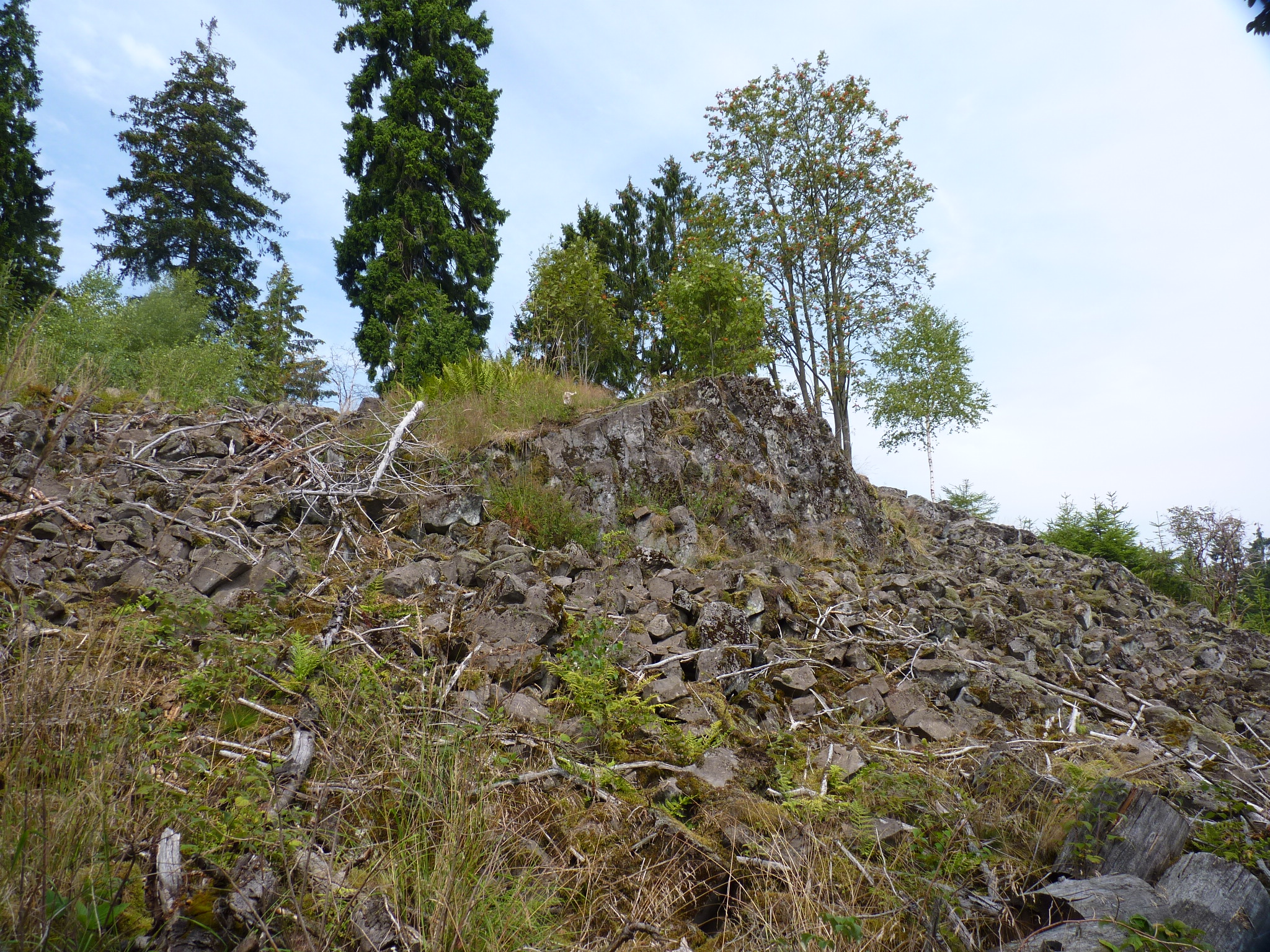
Part of the Trödelsteine (August 2014)

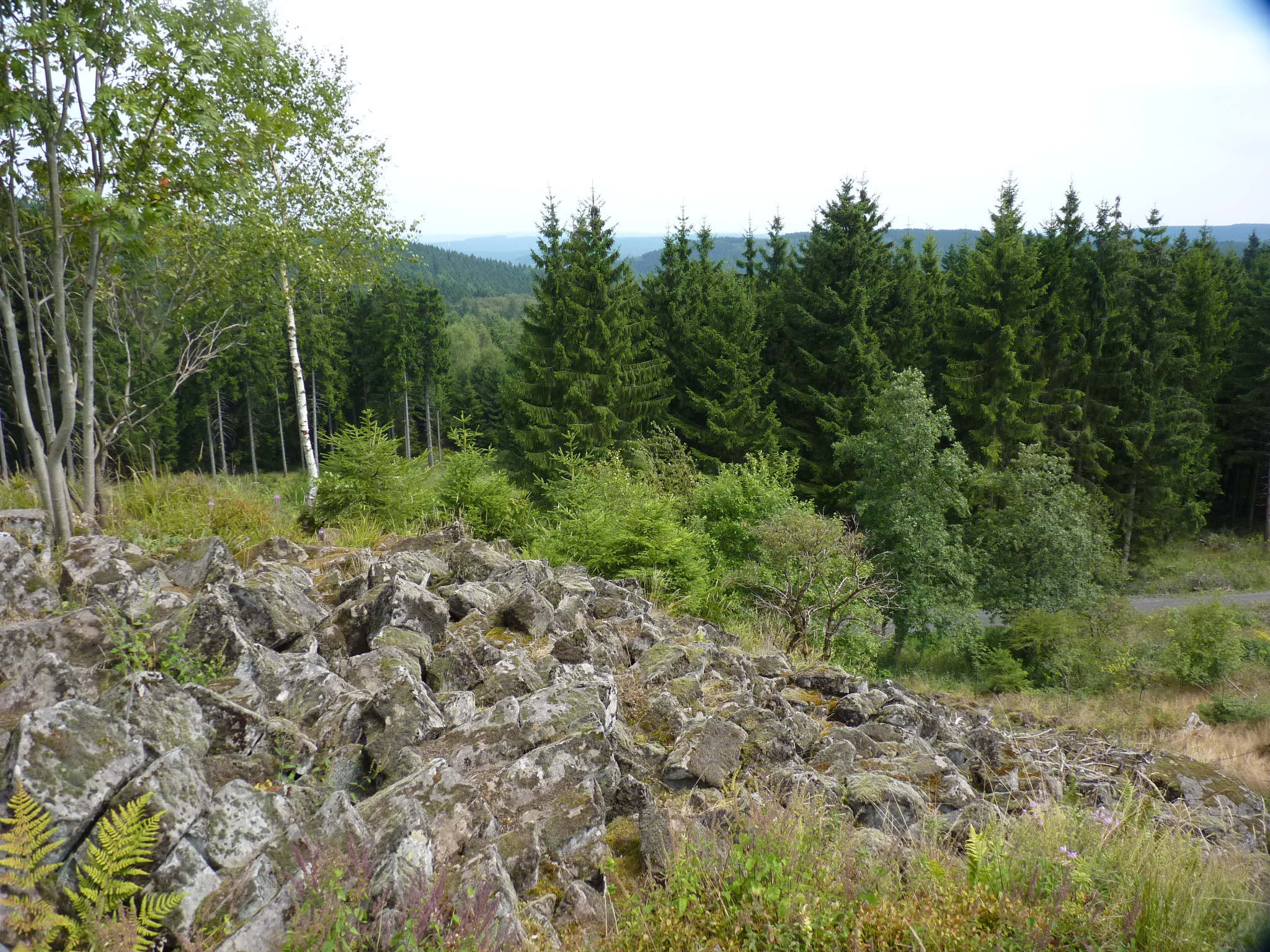
View from the Trödelsteine looking NE (August 2014)

The Trödelsteine, also called the Trödelstein, is a rock formation near Emmerzhausen in the county of Altenkirchen in the German state of Rhineland-Palatinate. It consists of columnar basalt and a basaltic blockfield in the Heller Upland. The rock formation has been designated as a natural monument, about 0.3 hectares in area.

== Geography ==
=== Location ===
The Trödelsteine lies about 1.2 kilometres northeast of Emmerzhausen, 3.6 km southwest of Burbach and 2.6 km northwest of Lippe, which are both in the neighbouring county of Siegen-Wittgenstein in North Rhine-Westphalia. The rocks extend up to the summit of the mountain on which they are found which is also called the Trödelsteine and is 613 m above sea level (NHN).

=== Rock formations in the vicinity ===
In the vicinity of the Trödelsteine are the basalt formations of Druidenstein near Herkersdorf, the Großer and Kleiner Stein near Burbach (two basalt blockfields), and the Teufelskanzel near Bad Laasphe.

== Description and geology ==
The Trödelsteine form several small basalt crags and, below them, a column and blockfield of feldspar basalt, which was broken here during the Tertiary by the basement.

The Trödelsteine are basaltic, volcanic domes (lava domes). Unlike the Westerwald, where an unbroken basalt layer formed, here only individual lava domes formed (cryptodomes). From the type of rock groups one can clearly reconstruct three different eruptions (vulcanite) , which were pushed up by the underlying Devonian basement.

On the northeastern slopes of the Trödelsteine there are several trees, the southwestern mountainside is completed forested.

== Hiking ==
On the Trödelsteine is a narrow footpath, which is part of the Trödelstein Path (Trödelsteinpfad), a 10.2-kilometre-long branch of the Rothaarsteig. The E1 European long distance path runs over the mountain, crossing the road at the state border. On the E1, about 250 metres from the rocks, stands a refuge hut, An den Trödelsteinen, which was erected in 2004 by members of the Westerwald Club. Also running past the rocks are the Heller Ridgeway (Hellerhöhenweg, waymark "H") and Siegerland High Ring (Siegerland-Höhenring).
