= Ginsterhahn =

Coordinates: 50°35′N 7°21′E

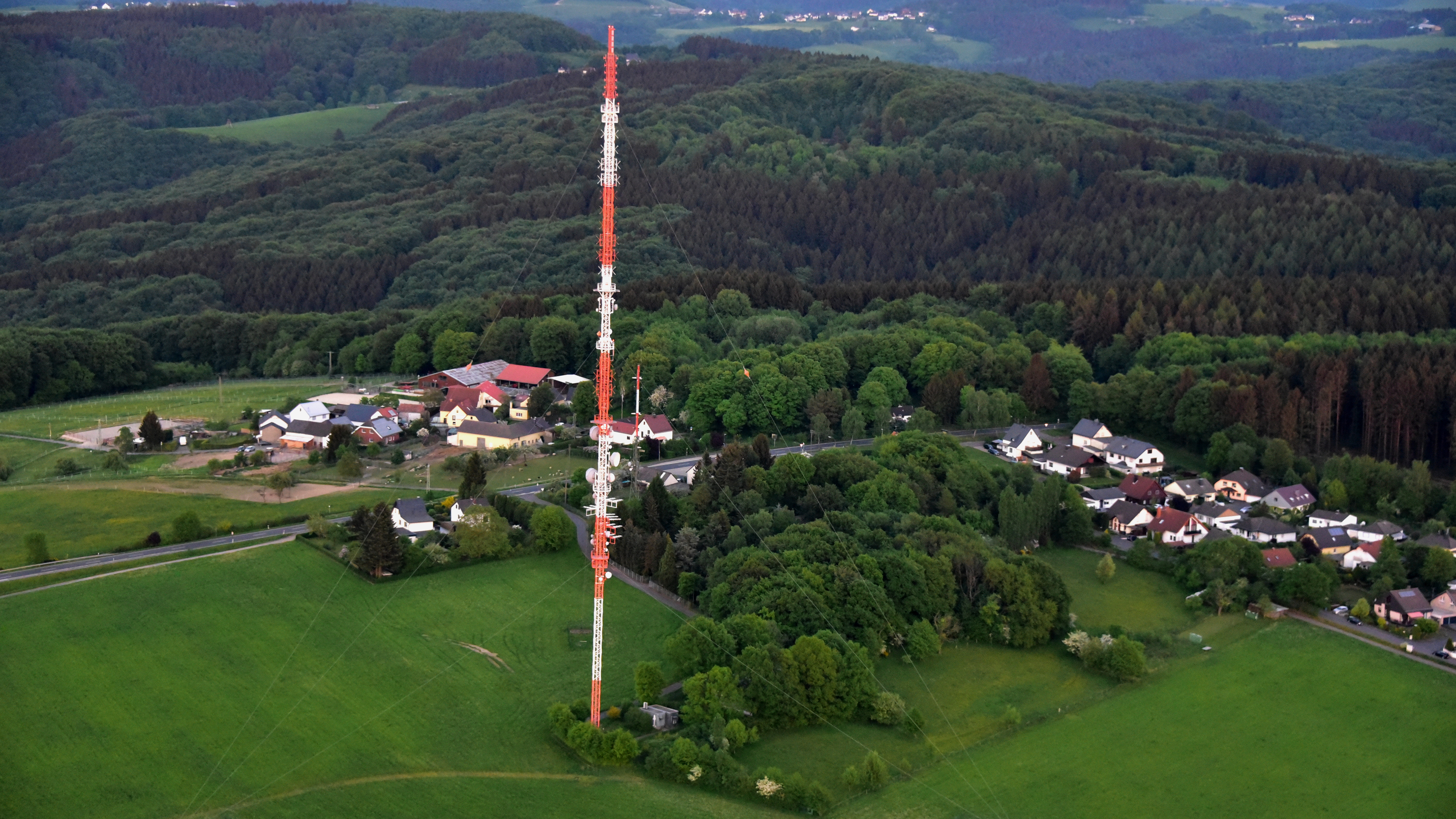
Ginsterhahn behind the Linz am Rhein transmitter

Ginsterhahn is an Ortschaft in the municipality Sankt Katharinen in the district of Neuwied in Rhineland-Palatinate, Germany. It lies on the Landesstraße 254 in the vicinity of Grendel, Kaimig, and the Linz am Rhein transmitter.
