= Buchheller =

River in Germany

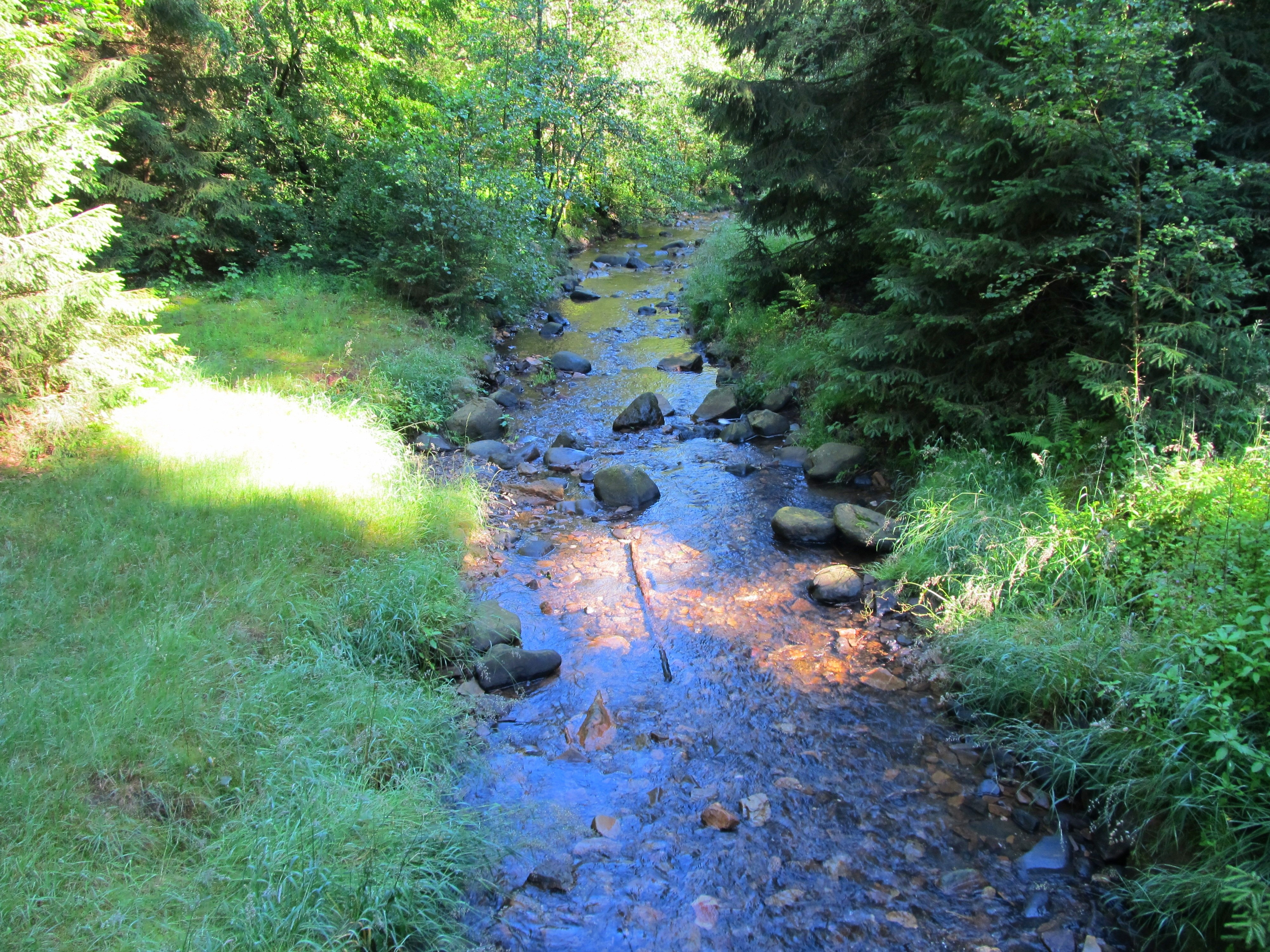

Location
- Country: Germany
- State: North Rhine-Westphalia

Physical characteristics
- Mouth
  - location: Heller
  - coordinates: 50.7588°N 8.0608°E

Basin features
- Progression: Heller→ Sieg→ Rhine→ North Sea

Buchheller is a river of North Rhine-Westphalia, Germany. It is 8.9 km long and flows into the Heller near Burbach.

== See also ==
- List of rivers of North Rhine-Westphalia
