= Vettelschoß =

- Municipality
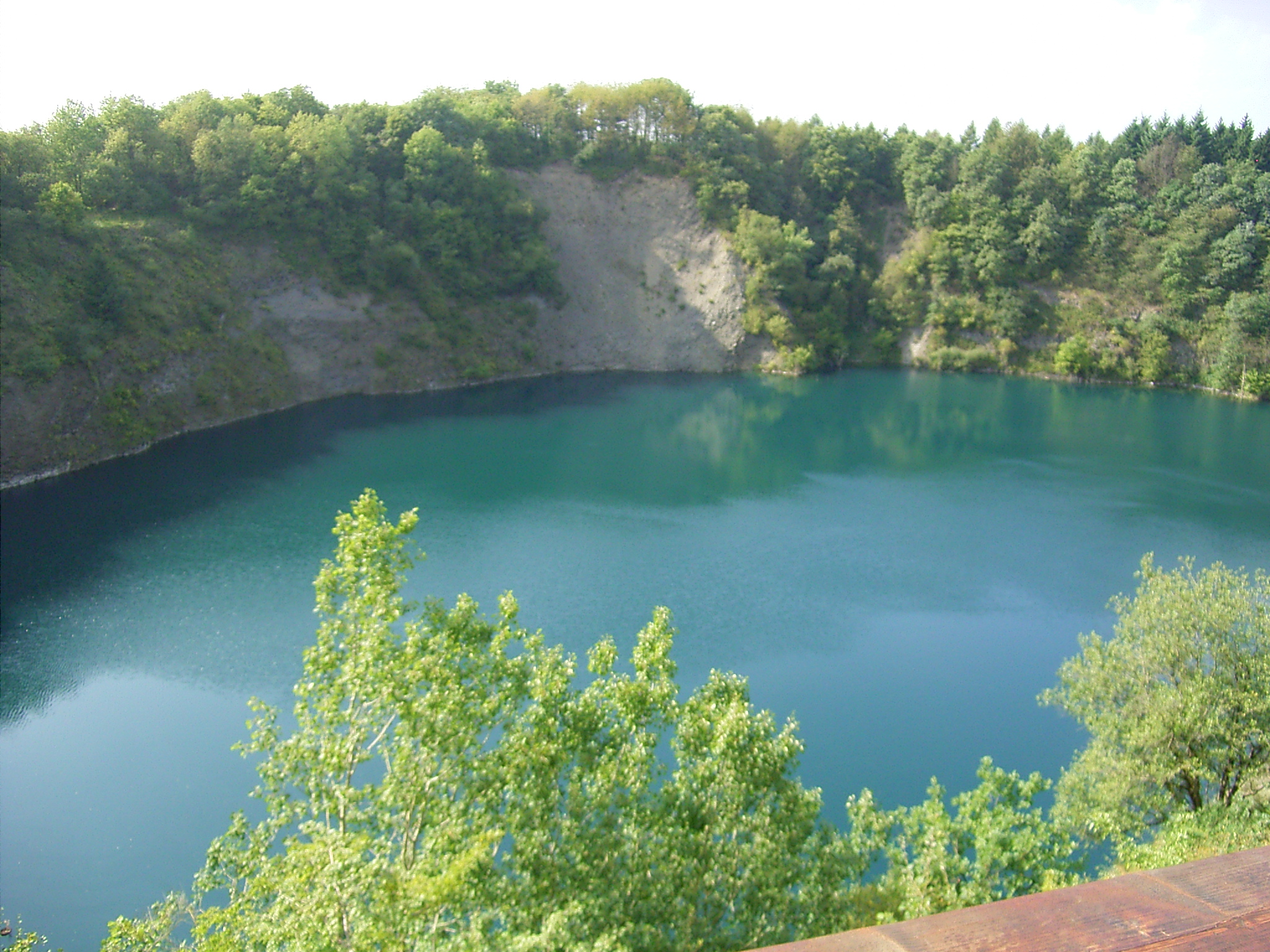

- Coat of arms

- Location of Vettelschoß within Neuwied district
- Interactive map of Vettelschoß
- Location within Germany Location within Rhineland-Palatinate
- Coordinates: 50°37′05″N 7°20′53″E
- Country: Germany
- State: Rhineland-Palatinate
- District: Neuwied
- Municipal assoc.: Linz am Rhein
- Subdivisions: 5

Government
  - Mayor (2019–24): Heinrich Freidel (CDU)

Area
  - Total: 6.91 km^{2} (2.67 sq mi)
- Elevation: 210–364 m (689–1,194 ft)

Population (2025-12-31)
  - Total: 3,686
  - Density: 533/km^{2} (1,380/sq mi)
- Time zone: UTC+01:00 (CET)
  - Summer (DST): UTC+02:00 (CEST)
- Postal codes: 53560
- Dialling codes: 02645
- Vehicle registration: NR
- Website: www.vettelschoss.de

Vettelschoß (German pronunciation: [ˈfɛtl̩ʃoːs]) is a municipality in the district of Neuwied in Rhineland-Palatinate, Germany. It includes the localities of Kalenborn, Kau, Oberwillscheid, and Willscheid, and forms part of the Verbandsgemeinde (collective municipality) of Linz am Rhein.

The municipality is written with an ß, which may be replaced by ss if not available (Vettelschoss).

Vettelschoß's coat of arms was adopted in 1983.

The shoe-manufacturing company Birkenstock had its head office in Vettelschoß from the 1990s until the beginning of 2014, when it was moved to the nearby Neustadt (Wied).

== Transport ==
The municipality is located in the transport association Verkehrsverbund Rhein-Mosel (VRM), in the fare zone number 286 and served by the public local bus lines 179, 180 and 182.

In the past there also was access to the local trains of the former Linz - Flammersfeld railway.
