= Barony of Westerwald =

The Barony of Westerwald (German: Herrschaft zum Westerwald) was a Vogtei created in the 15th century from the royal estate (Königshof) of Herborn in the German hill region of the High Westerwald.

== History ==
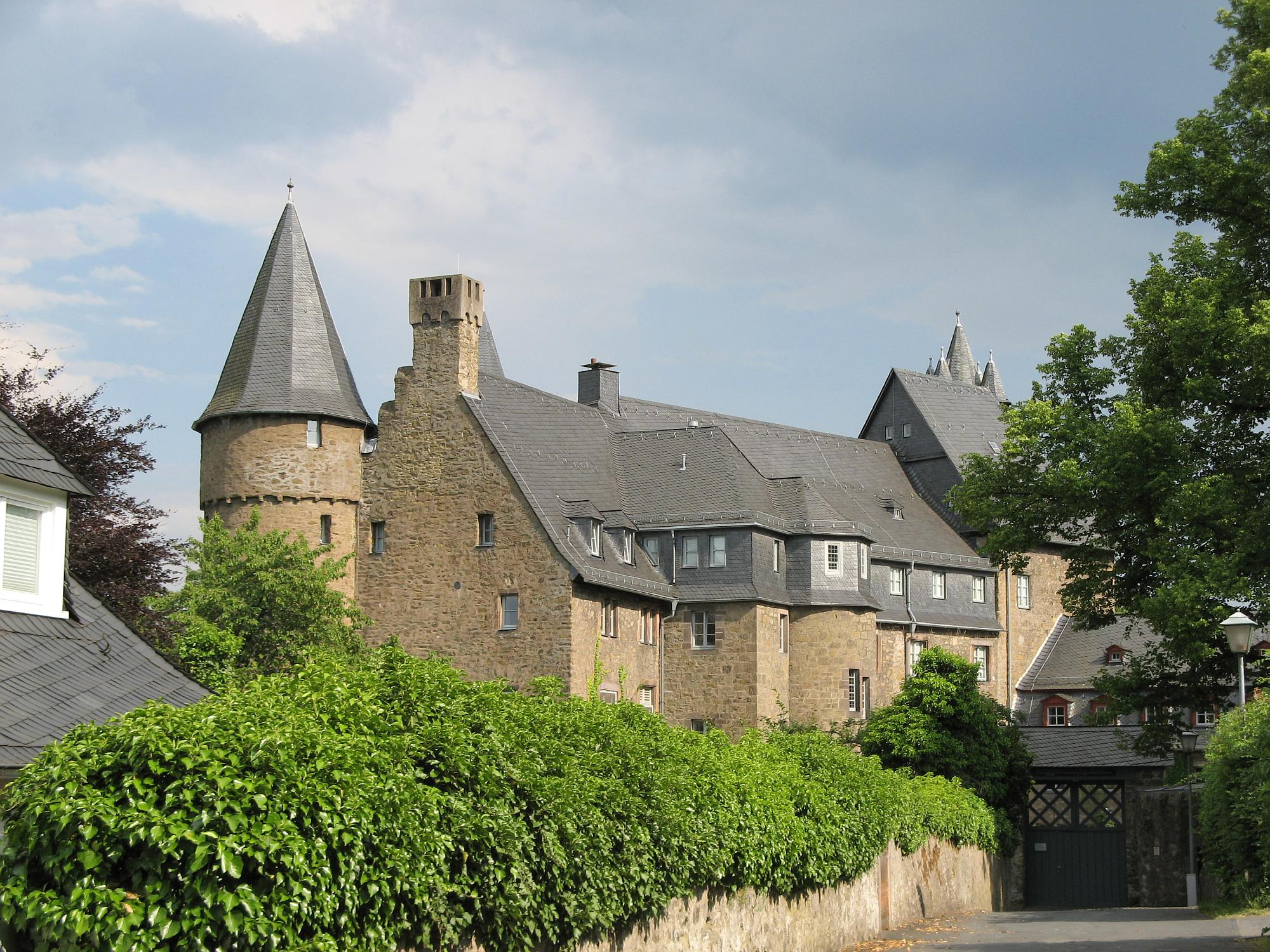
Schloss Herborn

The region, which lay west of Königshof Herborn, had originally been settled from the Chattian (Hessian) area. The barony covered the church parishes and their associated local magistracies (Zentgerichte) of Marienberg, Neukirch and Emmerichenhain. These three parishes in the High Westerwald first appear in a document dating to the year 1048. (Note: Roth, p. 9.)

Originally the Herrschaft zum Westerwald, which lay within the Herboremarca (March of Herborn), belonged to the counts of Gleiberg; but at the end of the 12th century it went to the counts of Nassau. As a fief of the Electorate of Cologne, the latter had the long-term possession of the Herrschaft zum Westerwald, exercising criminal jurisdiction (Gerichtsbarkeit) and territorial lordship rights. The parish of Marienberg had been emancipated by 1231 from Herborn. (Note: Roth, p. 103.) In a document of the regional magistracy (Landgericht) at Emmerichenhain in 1524, the appointment of a court with jurors from the three local jurisdictions (Gerichte, then the administrative units) of Marienberg, Emmerichenhain and Neukirch was decreed by the regional magistrate (Zentgraf). Instead of a count of Nassau-Beilstein, an Amtmann presided over the court. It was publicly declared that the Count of Nassau was not to be paid the Vogtland tax in the form of 'cow money' (Kuhgeld). (Note: Heyn, pp. 185 f.)

The border of the barony was protected in the north and northeast by a thick, impenetrable hedge (Heeg or Landheeg), and, in many places, also by a wide ditch and bank known as a Landwehr (border). In some places, gaps were made which had portcullises. One such passageway was supposed to have been on the border at the Großer Wolfstein west of Obermarienberg. In a protocol it said:

"Von dem Grenzstein auf dem hintersten Galgenpüsch die Mauer entlang, forters auf die Lücke zu, welche ober dem Wolfstein in der Mauer ist, allwo vor alters ein Thor gehangen hat." ("From the boundary stone on the rearmost gallows footing, along the wall, continuing to the gap which is in the wall above the Wolf Rock, from which a gate has been hung since time immemorial.")

— From the protocol of a border crossing, 1692 (Note: Heyn, p. 186.)

In the many settlements in the south of the Barony along the river Nister, such special defensive measures were not needed. The occupants of the Westerwald marches, as free vogts, had the same status as nobility. Duties and service were rendered to the territorial overlords; but the vogts dealt with their own affairs independently at the regional magistracy of Emmerichenhain and at the individual magistracies (Zentgerichte), so their overlords, the princes, were not involved in the administration of justice (Rechtspflege). Each parish had free rein over the village land (the Dorfmark) and looked after its own defences; forest and pasture were commonly owned by all members of the Barony.

From the 15th century, however, even in the marches of Westerwald, the princes began to intervene in the management of the march and, for example, issue decrees about the use of the forests, using the pretext that there had been abuses. Nevertheless, the Westerwald vogts continued to enjoy freedom in disposing of their own property and person; they could leave the Westerwald without the consent of the lords and only paid for the protection they had enjoyed so far, the "holiday bounty" (Urlaubsschatz). (Note: Heyn, p. 187.) Even forms of serfdom - such as Besthaupt and Buwetheil - did not exist.

"Auch sall off Westerwalde kein Besteheudt sin noch noch nemen und nit Buwetheile, darum ist auch keyn Bosem off Westerwalde und ist diß alle wegen zo Westerwalde Recht gewest und noch ist und daby blyben soll." ("Also, no Besthaupt exists or shall be imposed in the Westerwald, nor Buwetheil, therefore there is also no serfdom in the Westerwald and this is so everywhere that the Westerwald rights have existed and still do and so shall remain.")

— Legal decision of the regional magistracy of Emmerichenhein in 1456.

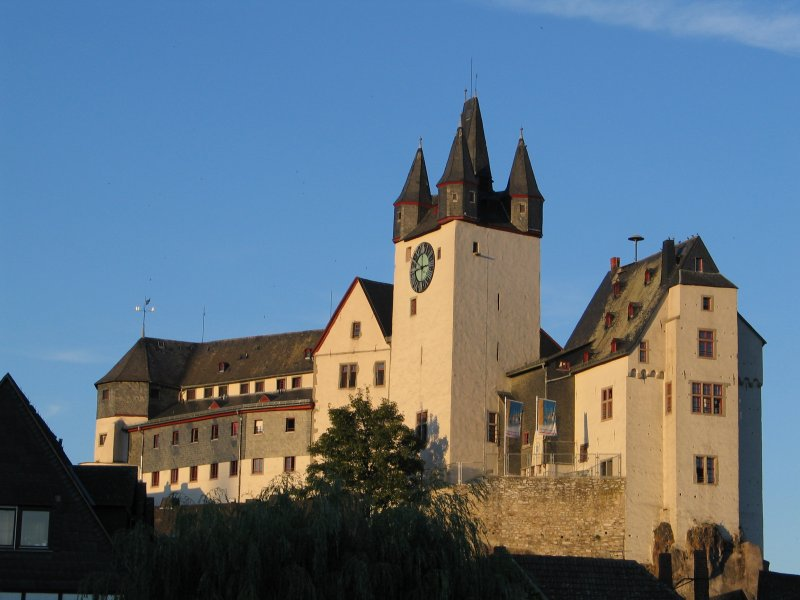
The comital schloss above Diez

The Bosem (or Busen), the 'right of serfdom' (Leibeigenschaftsrecht), also did not exist in the Westerwald. Ordinarily this meant that children of a marriage between a free man and woman in serfdom had to accept the feudal obligations of the mother; but in the Westerwald even these children were free Vogtleute. Even the so-called Wiltfang was only exercised in a restricted way; whoever entered the Westerwald, usually became a free Vogtmann and enjoyed all the rights of the villagers in whose village he settled, as long as no-one protested against his settlement there within a year.

Nevertheless, there were forms of serfdom, because the so-called "five free hands" (fünf Freihänden), the Count of Diez, the Count of Wied, and the Lords of Weidenhahn, Schönhals and Greifenstein had the right of settlement (Einzugsrecht). That meant that they could settle a certain number of their own people in the baronial territory and impose taxes and service on them. Because there was no Wiltfang and Busen, these serfs became fewer and fewer. In 1567 Count John did away with the rights of serfdom entirely. In a report by the Amtmann in Beilstein there were three groups of people were listed in the Westerwald:

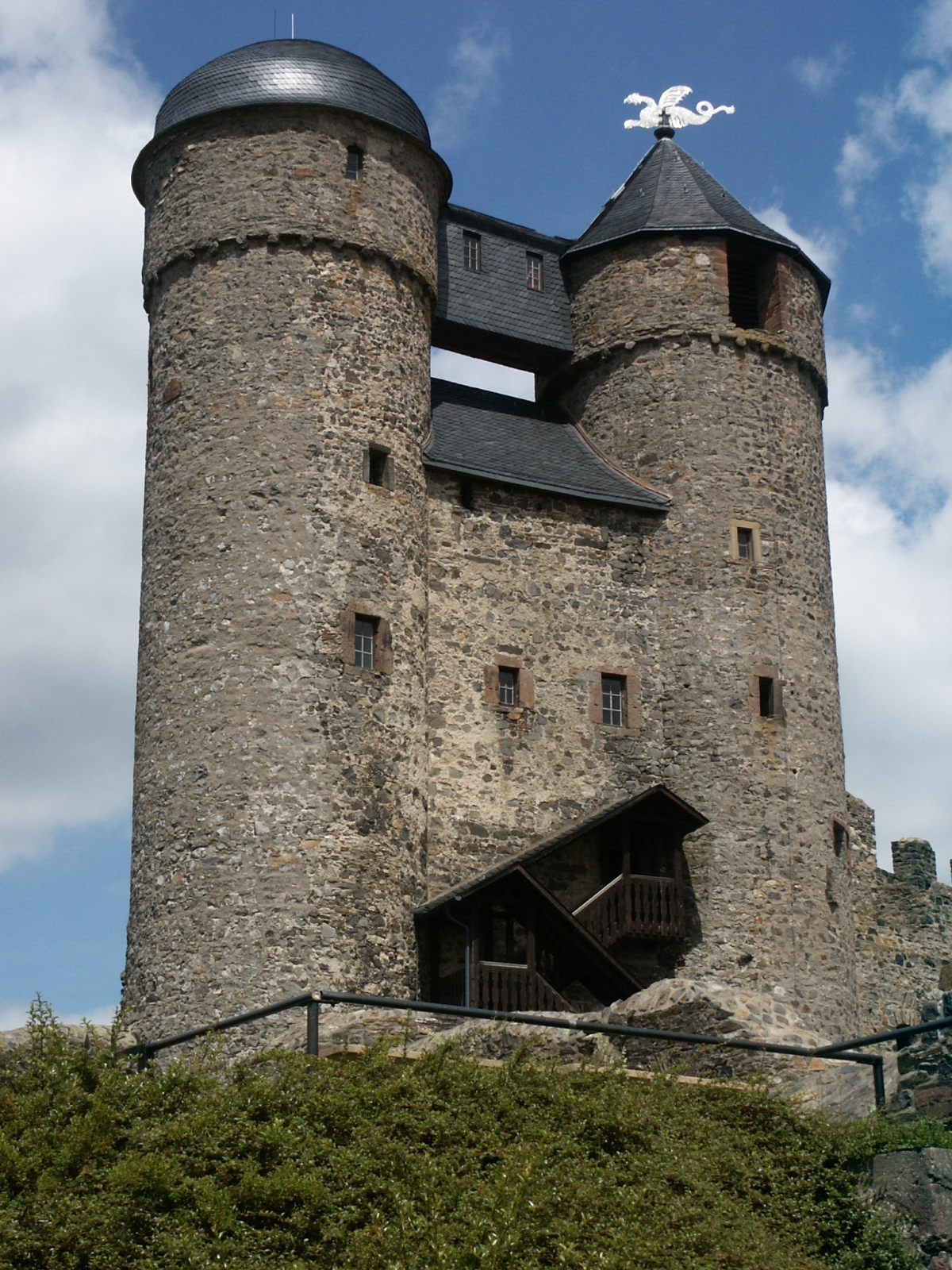
Greifenstein Castle

1. Eigenleute ("independent people") and their houses, the Egenhöf. These are "obliged to pay taxes to no-one" "there is the house owned by the occupant (Eigenhaus) or the group of 30 houses (Höf 30 Haus)";
2. Vogtleute ("Vogt people") and their houses, Vogthöfe; half the taxes went to the Nassau overlords and half to Westerburg and Wied; the report states that there are "in Emmerichenhain 54 houses, Mergenberg (Marienberg) 45 houses, Neukirchen (Stein-Neukirch) 30 houses";
3. Mönchsleute ("monks", three houses), their taxes go to the Abbey of Mergenstatt (Marienstatt Abbey); in addition interest and economic surpluses, as with the Westerburg Eigenleute, of which the report did not list any in the Westerwald. (Note: Heyn, p. 188.)

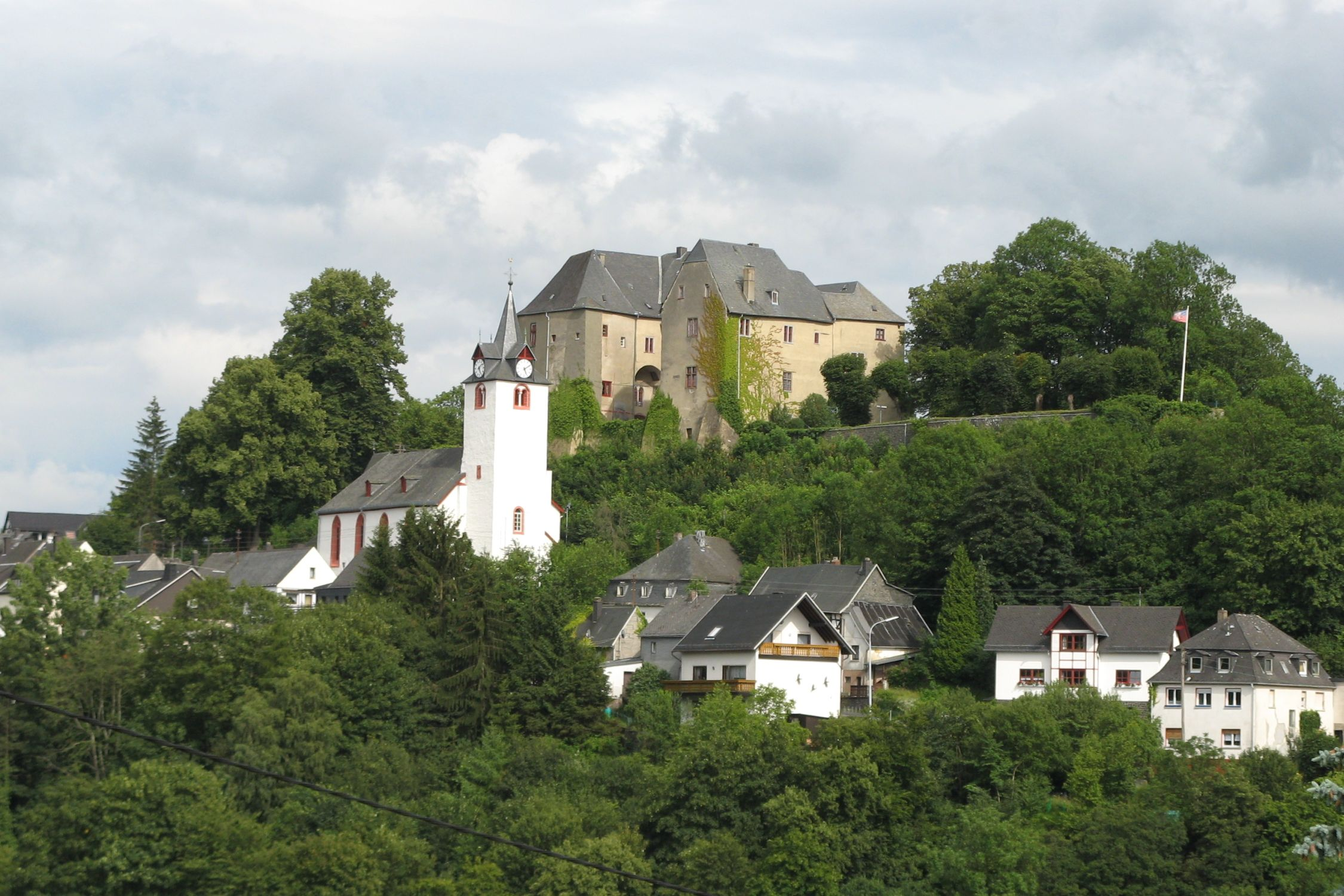
Westerburg's schloss

The oldest document, in which the rights of the Barony are described, dates to 1396. This records a treaty between Henry, Count of Nassau-Beilstein and Reynard, Count of Westerburg. In this treaty, Nassau is allocated water and pasture, Gebot und Verbot or the actual suzerainty with the church parishes of Marienberg, Neukirch and Emmerichenhain; Westerburg and Runkel retain eight marks a year of weregild (Manngelder) and rights over the mills, hunting and fishing; serfs (Wiltfänge) were divided. Other documents record, according to Heyn "that they enjoyed a high degree of independence through their own regional court, something that was not very common in German-speaking lands at that time." (Note: Heyn, p. 189.) The main duty to the overlords was the Bede; this was based on the yield and nature of the farmland, depending on how much was arable land or was ploughed by oxen or horses. In addition to the fixed estate duties the Westerwald also had unusual taxes, which the overlords could exact under certain circumstances. In addition, the Westerwald folk had to do some service, like that of serfs, but only where it was considered appropriate.

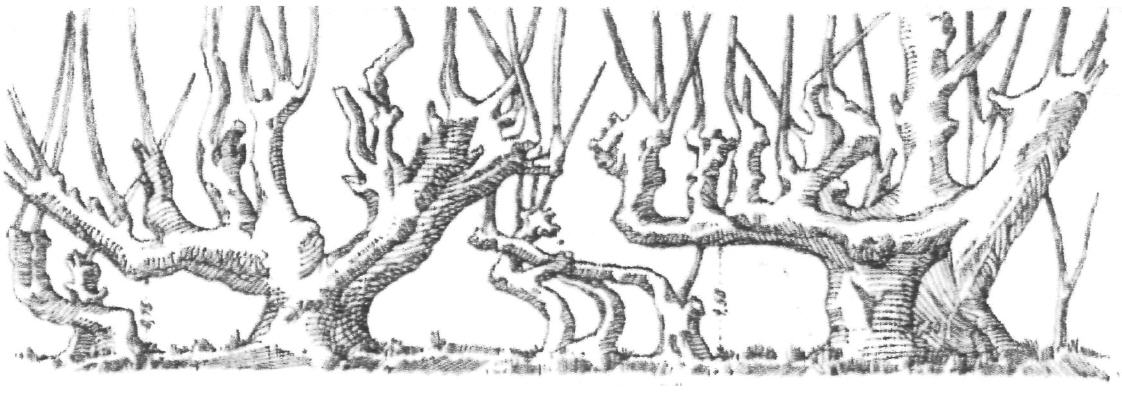
Remains of the Rheingauer Gebück around 1895 by Cohausen

All this was laid down in edicts (Gebote) which, for example, regulated that the Westerwald peoples had to transport grain and, every eight days, a wine shipment from the Rhine to the castles of Dillenburg, Herborn, Beilstein or Liebenscheid. Other services included escort duties or the taking of messages or documents as well as military service. Further services were the transport of dung, firewood and lumber, the building of hedges and Landwehren and ditches with gates to secure the country and the lord's castle (Landesburg). (Note: Heyn, p. 191.) The Salzburger Kopf, one of the highest points in the Westerwald, was the location of jurisdiction for the three courts of Marienberg, Emmerichenhain and Neukirch even in 1788.

== Territory ==
The territory of the Barony covered three church parishes which were simultaneously tithe districts or Zentbezirke. The list on which the following is based, dating from 1799, also lists the associated towns and villages, some of which had already disappeared in the Middle Ages, as well as old town names:

Zent Marienberg

- Bach
- Bölsberg
- Eichenstruth
- Erbach (Erlebach)
- Fehl (zum Felde)
- Giebelhausen (abandoned village)
- Gielhayn (Wüstung)
- Großseifen (Grauseiffen, Graensyffen)
- Hardt (Harth)
- Hinterhofen (abandoned village)
- Hof
- Illfurt (Elsfurt)
- Kaldenborn (abandoned village)
- Korb
- Langenbach
- Marienberg
- Pfuhl
- Ritzhausen (Rytzhusen)
- Rodenberg (abandoned village)
- Scheydongen (abandoned village)
- Stangenrod (Stangenroth)
- Stockhausen
- Unnau (Unna)
- Wartenberg (abandoned village)
- Zinhain (Zinnhayn, Zenen)

Zent Neukirch

- Bretthausen (Bredehusen)
- Kotzhausen (abandoned village)
- Kramphusen (abandoned village)
- Löhnfeld (Lynfeld, Lyntfeld)
- Neukirch (Neuenkirchen)
- Stein
- Willingen (Wildongen)

Zent Emmerichenhain

- Breidenbach (abandoned village)
- Emmerichenhain (Embirchenhagene)
- Homberg (Hoensberge, Hoembberg)
- Kindschue (Königshub, abandoned village)
- Mörendorf (Merendorf, Moverendorf)
- Murndorf (Wüstung)
- Niederroßbach
- Nister
- Oberroßbach
- Rehe (Rey)
- Salzburg (Salzperch)
- Waigandshain (Wynanzhayn)
- Zehnhausen

== Remarks and footnotes ==
- E. Heyn: Der Westerwald. 1893. Niederwalluf, Martin Sändig, Reprint 1970.
- Hermann-Josef Roth: Der Westerwald. DuMont, Cologne, 1981.

== Literature ==
- E. Heyn: Der Westerwald. 1893. Niederwalluf, Martin Sändig, Reprint 1970.
- Hermann-Josef Roth: Der Westerwald. Cologne, DuMont, 1981.
