= Neunkhausen =

- Municipality
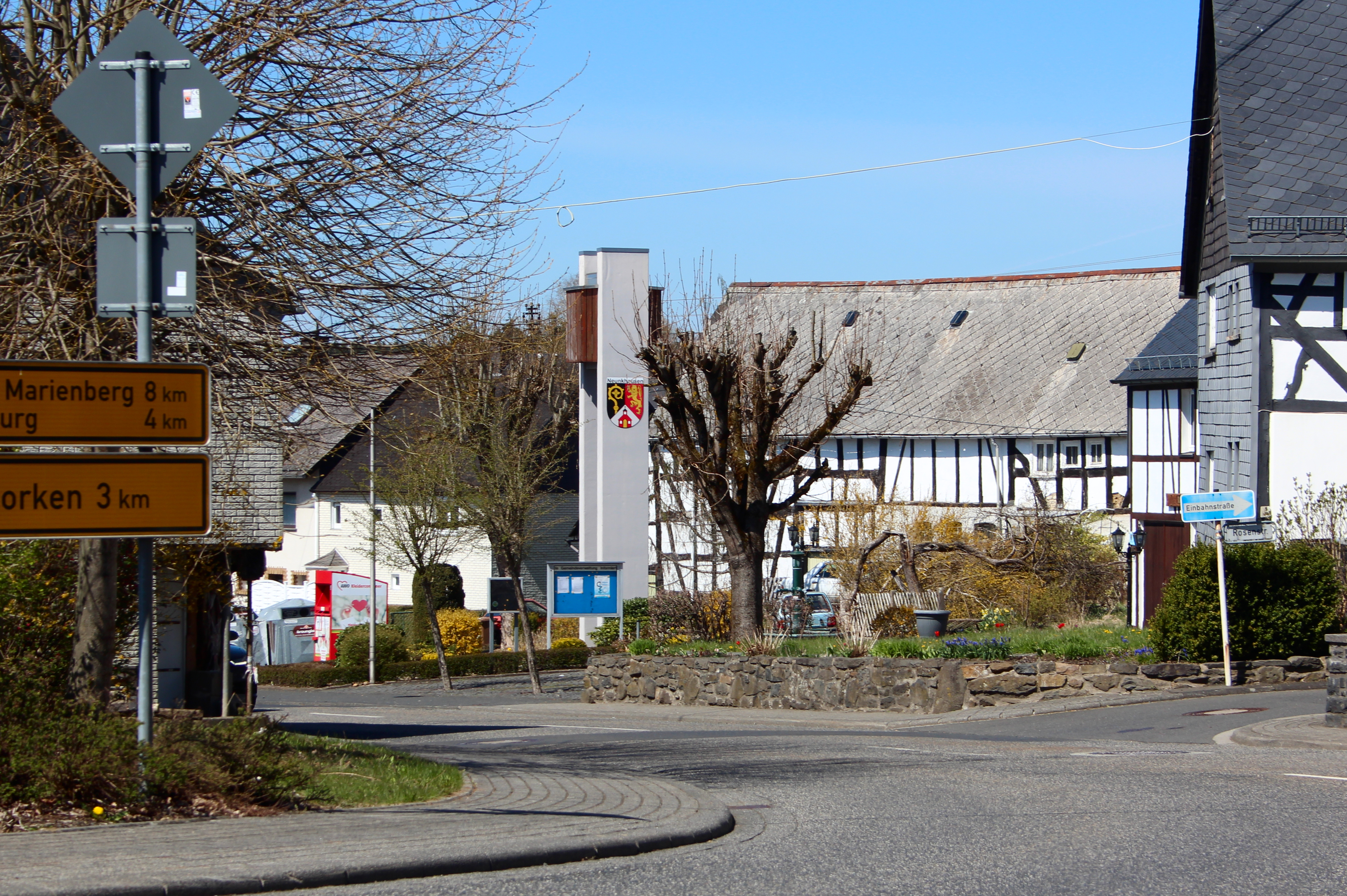

- Coat of arms

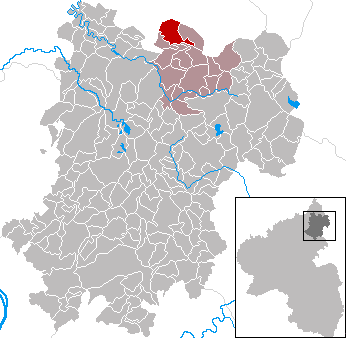
- Location of Neunkhausen within Westerwaldkreis district
- Interactive map of Neunkhausen
- Location within Germany Location within Rhineland-Palatinate
- Coordinates: 50°42′26″N 7°54′10″E
- Country: Germany
- State: Rhineland-Palatinate
- District: Westerwaldkreis
- Municipal assoc.: Bad Marienberg (Westerwald)

Government
  - Mayor (2019–24): Rudi Neufurth

Area
  - Total: 7.86 km^{2} (3.03 sq mi)
- Elevation: 455 m (1,493 ft)

Population (2025-12-31)
  - Total: 1,040
  - Density: 132/km^{2} (343/sq mi)
- Time zone: UTC+01:00 (CET)
  - Summer (DST): UTC+02:00 (CEST)
- Postal codes: 57520
- Dialling codes: 02661
- Vehicle registration: WW
- Website: www.neunkhausen.de

Neunkhausen is an Ortsgemeinde – a community belonging to a Verbandsgemeinde – in the Westerwaldkreis in Rhineland-Palatinate, Germany.

== Geography ==
The community lies in the Westerwald between Limburg and Siegen on the boundary with North Rhine-Westphalia. Neunkhausen belongs to the Verbandsgemeinde of Bad Marienberg, a kind of collective municipality. Its seat is in the like-named town.

== History ==
In 1215, Adelheit von Molsberg endowed the parish of Kirburg to found a monastery. On the spot, which is still called Zum Altenkloster (“At the Old Monastery”), a chapel brings the past to mind. It nowadays belongs to the Ortsgemeinde of Neunkhausen. For the monks living there then, the rough climate on the Neunkhäuser Plateau, as it was known, was too harsh. They moved to a spot on the river Nister where they built the Marienstatt Monastery.

In 1259, Neunkhausen had its first documented mention. All statistics and information about Neunkhausen in the Middle Ages stem from the Marienstatt Monastery's documents.

== Politics ==
=== Municipal council ===
The municipal council is made up of 16 council members who were elected in a majority vote in a municipal election on 13 June 2004.

=== Coat of arms ===
The community's arms show both its membership of the parish of Kirburg and the lion of the County of Sayn. The chapel in the lower field symbolizes the old monastery as well as the St.Wendelinuskapelle. This chapel had its first documented mention in 1447. It was found on what is today Neunkhausen's fountain square and was endowed by the Counts of Sayn. It stood until 1822.

== Economy and infrastructure ==
South of the community runs Bundesstraße 414, leading from Driedorf-Hohenroth to Hachenburg. The nearest Autobahn interchange is Haiger/Burbach on the A 45 (Dortmund–Hanau), some 25 km away. The nearest InterCityExpress stop is the railway station at Montabaur on the Cologne-Frankfurt high-speed rail line.
