= Joachim Hörster =

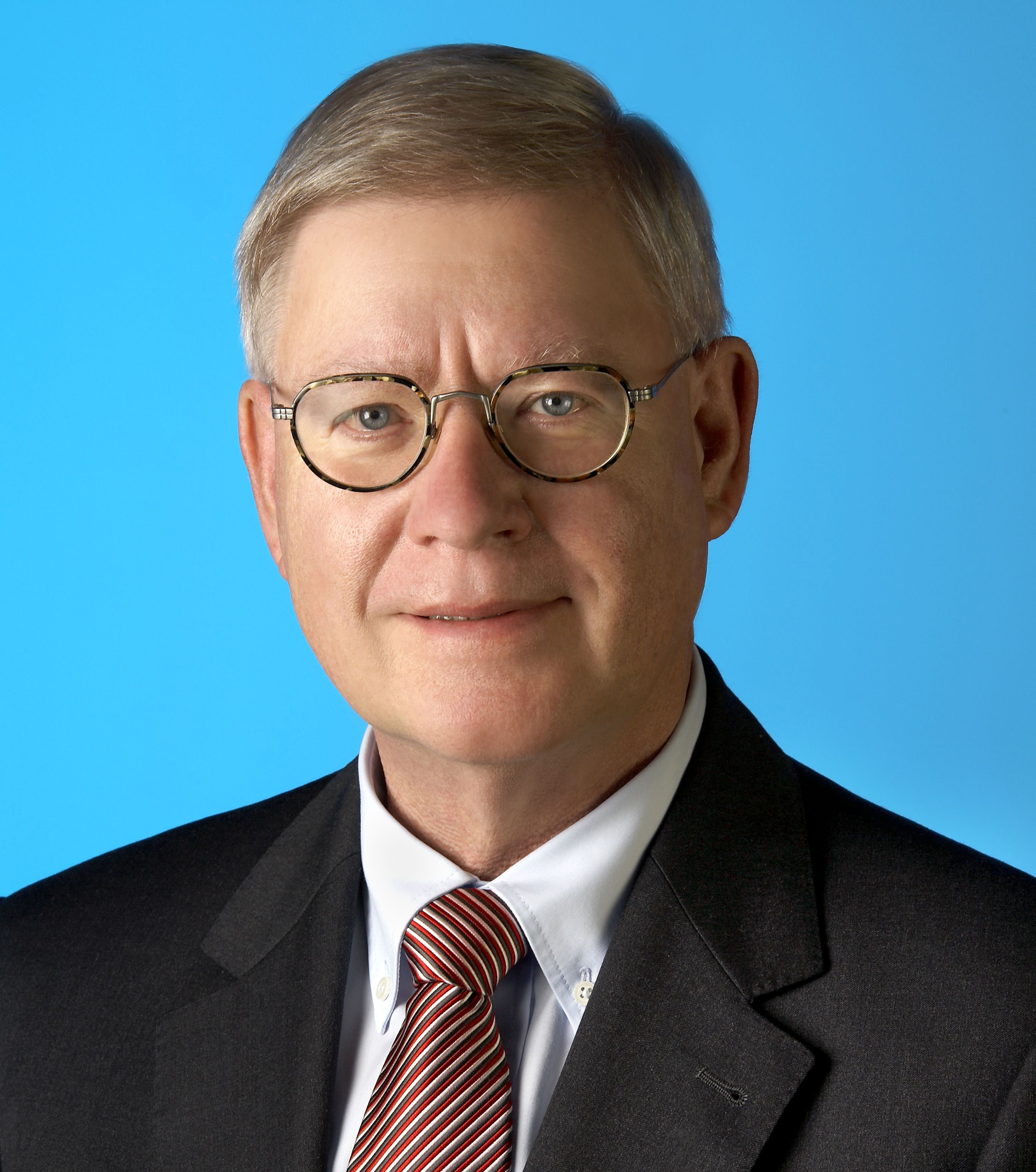
Joachim Hörster (2010)

Joachim Hörster (26 March 1945 – 30 December 2020) was a German lawyer and politician of the Christian Democratic Union of Germany (CDU). He served as a member of the Bundestag, the federal parliament of Germany, from 1987 to 2013, representing Rhineland-Palatinate. During his parliamentary career, he held several senior positions within the CDU/CSU parliamentary group, including Parliamentary Managing Director from 1992 to 2000 and chairman of the CDU state group of Rhineland-Palatinate. He also served as chairman of the Mediation Committee between the Bundestag and the Bundesrat from 2002 to 2009.

Before entering federal politics, Hörster was mayor of the Verbandsgemeinde Westerburg from 1972 to 1983 and a member of the Landtag of Rhineland-Palatinate from 1983 to 1987. He was known particularly for his work on parliamentary affairs and European cooperation. From 2003 to 2014 he was a member of the Parliamentary Assembly of the Council of Europe.

Born in Lautzenbrücken in the Westerwald region, Hörster studied state and legal sciences after completing his Abitur and worked as a lawyer. He joined the CDU in 1965, beginning his political career locally as the first mayor of the Verbandsgemeinde Westerburg from 1972 to 1983, a member of the Westerwaldkreis district council from 1974 to 1994 (serving as CDU faction leader from 1983 to 1991), and a member of the Rhineland-Palatinate state parliament from 1983 to 1987.

Hörster was recognized for his long service to parliamentary democracy and his home region with awards such as the Federal Cross of Merit, First Class in 1997, the Officer's Cross of the Hungarian Order of Merit in 2014, and the Konrad-Adenauer Commemorative Plaque from the CDU Westerwald in 2015. He was married with two children and died in Westerburg after a prolonged illness.

== Life and career ==
Hörster was born on 26 March 1945 in Lautzenbrücken, in the Westerwaldkreis district of Rhineland-Palatinate. After completing secondary education, he studied law and political science at the University of Freiburg and the Johannes Gutenberg University Mainz. He passed both state examinations in law and was admitted as a lawyer.

From 1972 to 1983, Hörster served as the first mayor of the newly established Verbandsgemeinde Westerburg. During this period, he gained experience in local government and became active in regional politics. He was a member of the Westerwaldkreis district council from 1974 to 1994 and served as chairman of the CDU parliamentary group in the district council from 1983 to 1987.

In 1983, Hörster was elected to the Landtag of Rhineland-Palatinate, where he served until 1987. He entered the Bundestag in 1987 and remained a member until his retirement from federal politics in 2013. Aabgeordnetenwatch

== Political party ==
Joachim Hörster joined the Christian Democratic Union (CDU) in 1965.

From 1969 to 1973, he served as chairman of the Oberwesterwald district association of the Junge Union, the youth organization affiliated with the CDU. From 1993 to 2005, he was chairman of the CDU district association of Koblenz-Montabaur.These internal party leadership positions in his regional base helped establish his standing within the CDU organization in Rhineland-Palatinate.

== Public Office ==
From 1972 to 1983, Hörster served as mayor of the Westerburg Verbandsgemeinde (a collective municipality). He was a member of the Foundation Advisory Board of Europahaus Marienberg and, since 2007, a board member of the DAFG (German-Arab Friendship Association).

== Member of parliament ==
Hörster served on the Westerwaldkreis district council from 1974 to 1994 and in the Rhineland-Palatinate state parliament from 1983 to 1987.

He was a member of the German Bundestag from 1987 to 2013. During this time, he served as a parliamentary whip for the CDU/CSU parliamentary group from May 1992 to March 2000, and as First Parliamentary Whip from November 1994 to October 1998.

Joachim Hörster entered the Bundestag via the Rhineland-Palatinate state party list in the 1998 federal election; in all other elections, he won a direct mandate for the Montabaur constituency. He secured 46.6% of the first-preference votes in that Electoral district in the 2005 federal election and 43.2% in the 2009 election. He did not run for re-election in 2013.

== Death ==
Joachim Hörster died on 30 December 2020 in Westerburg at the age of 75. The CDU in Rhineland-Palatinate and the Westerwald region mourned his passing, highlighting his decades of service in local, state, and federal politics, including his long tenure in the Bundestag from 1987 to 2013.
