= Langenbach bei Kirburg =

- Municipality
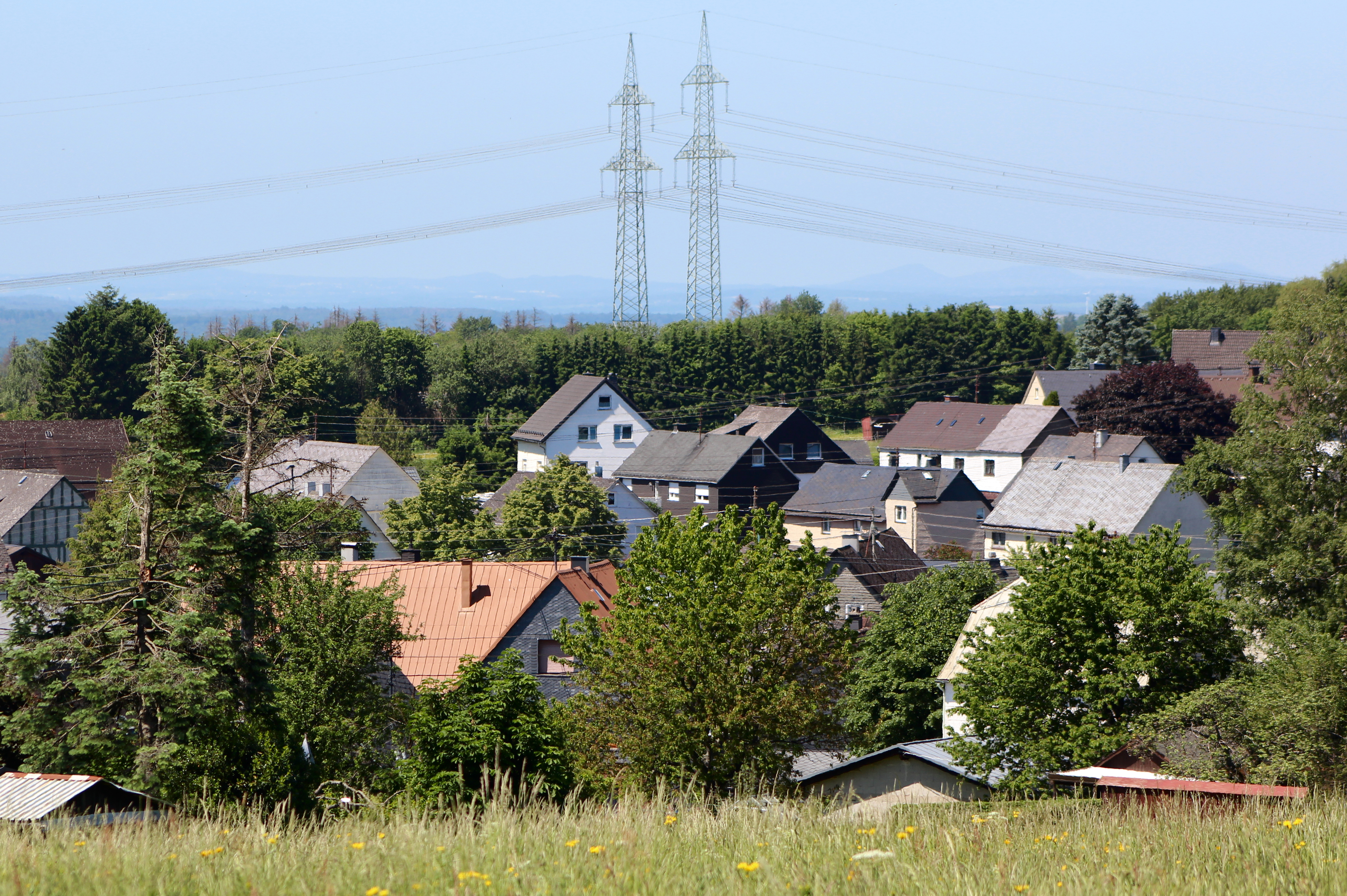

- Coat of arms

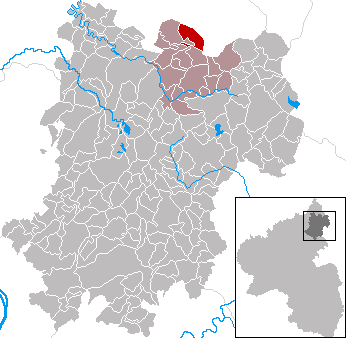
- Location of Langenbach bei Kirburg within Westerwaldkreis district
- Interactive map of Langenbach bei Kirburg
- Location within Germany Location within Rhineland-Palatinate
- Coordinates: 50°42′14″N 7°56′12″E
- Country: Germany
- State: Rhineland-Palatinate
- District: Westerwaldkreis
- Municipal assoc.: Bad Marienberg (Westerwald)

Government
  - Mayor (2019–24): Artur Schneider

Area
  - Total: 5.53 km^{2} (2.14 sq mi)
- Elevation: 500 m (1,600 ft)

Population (2025-12-31)
  - Total: 1,102
  - Density: 199/km^{2} (516/sq mi)
- Time zone: UTC+01:00 (CET)
  - Summer (DST): UTC+02:00 (CEST)
- Postal codes: 57520
- Dialling codes: 02661
- Vehicle registration: WW
- Website: www.bad-marienberg.de

Langenbach bei Kirburg (German pronunciation: [ˈlaŋənbax baɪ ˈkɪʁbʊʁk], lit. 'Langenbach near Kirburg') is an Ortsgemeinde – a municipality belonging to a Verbandsgemeinde – in the Westerwaldkreis in Rhineland-Palatinate, Germany.

== Geography ==
The community lies in the Westerwald between Limburg and Siegen on the boundary with North Rhine-Westphalia. The Langenbach, which belongs to the Sieg drainage basin, flows through the municipal area. Langenbach bei Kirburg belongs to the Verbandsgemeinde of Bad Marienberg, a kind of collective municipality. Its seat is in the like-named town.

== History ==
In 1261, Langenbach bei Kirburg had its first documentary mention.

== Politics ==
The municipal council is made up of 12 council members who were elected in a majority vote in a municipal election on 13 June 2004.

== Economy and infrastructure ==
=== Transport ===
South of the community runs Bundesstraße 414, leading from Hohenroth to Hachenburg. The nearest Autobahn interchanges are in Siegen and Wilnsdorf on the A 45 (Dortmund–Hanau), some 20 km away. The nearest InterCityExpress stop is the railway station at Montabaur on the Cologne-Frankfurt high-speed rail line.
