= Mörlen =

- Municipality
- Coat of arms

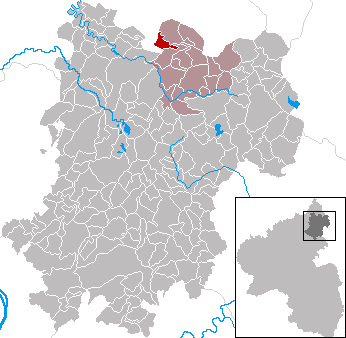
- Location of Mörlen within Westerwaldkreis district
- Interactive map of Mörlen
- Location within Germany Location within Rhineland-Palatinate
- Coordinates: 50°41′53″N 7°53′4″E
- Country: Germany
- State: Rhineland-Palatinate
- District: Westerwaldkreis
- Municipal assoc.: Bad Marienberg (Westerwald)

Government
  - Mayor (2019–24): Thomas Ax

Area
  - Total: 3.07 km^{2} (1.19 sq mi)
- Elevation: 416 m (1,365 ft)

Population (2025-12-31)
  - Total: 534
  - Density: 174/km^{2} (451/sq mi)
- Time zone: UTC+01:00 (CET)
  - Summer (DST): UTC+02:00 (CEST)
- Postal codes: 57583
- Dialling codes: 02661
- Vehicle registration: WW
- Website: www.bad-marienberg.de

Mörlen is an Ortsgemeinde – a community belonging to a Verbandsgemeinde – in the Westerwaldkreis in Rhineland-Palatinate, Germany.

== Geography ==
The community lies in the Westerwald between Limburg and Siegen on the boundary with North Rhine-Westphalia. The community lies in a hollow on a south slope on the course of the Kleine Nister, and is one of the richest communities in woodlands in the Westerwaldkreis. Mörlen belongs to the Verbandsgemeinde of Bad Marienberg, a kind of collective municipality. Its seat is in the like-named town.

== History ==
Mörlen is among the oldest settled centres in the Upper Westerwald. While the brook name Nigra Morlaha had already been mentioned in writings from 914 and 1048, the actual community had its first documentary mention on 13 November 1262 in a document from the Marienstatt Abbey. A church in Mörlen appears in a charter granted by Emperor Frederick II on 19 October 1213 to the Teutonic Knights.

== Politics ==
The municipal council is made up of 12 council members who were elected in a municipal election on 26 May 2019.

== Culture and sightseeing ==
=== Buildings ===
The community's centrepiece is the Catholic parish church, Maria Empfängnis (“Immaculate Conception”). It was built in 1866 and expanded in 1882 and 1949. In 2003, it was fundamentally renovated.

=== Regular events ===
The first weekend in July is when the traditional kermis is always held.

== Economy and infrastructure ==
South of the community runs Bundesstraße 414, leading from Hohenroth (Driedorf) to Hachenburg. The nearest Autobahn interchange is Haiger-Burbach on the A 45 (Dortmund–Gießen), some 27 km away. There is a bus line running through Mörlen which connects Mörlen to the railway stations of Betzdorf and Hachenburg. The nearest InterCityExpress stop is the railway station at Montabaur on the Cologne-Frankfurt high-speed rail line.
