= Bölsberg =

- Municipality
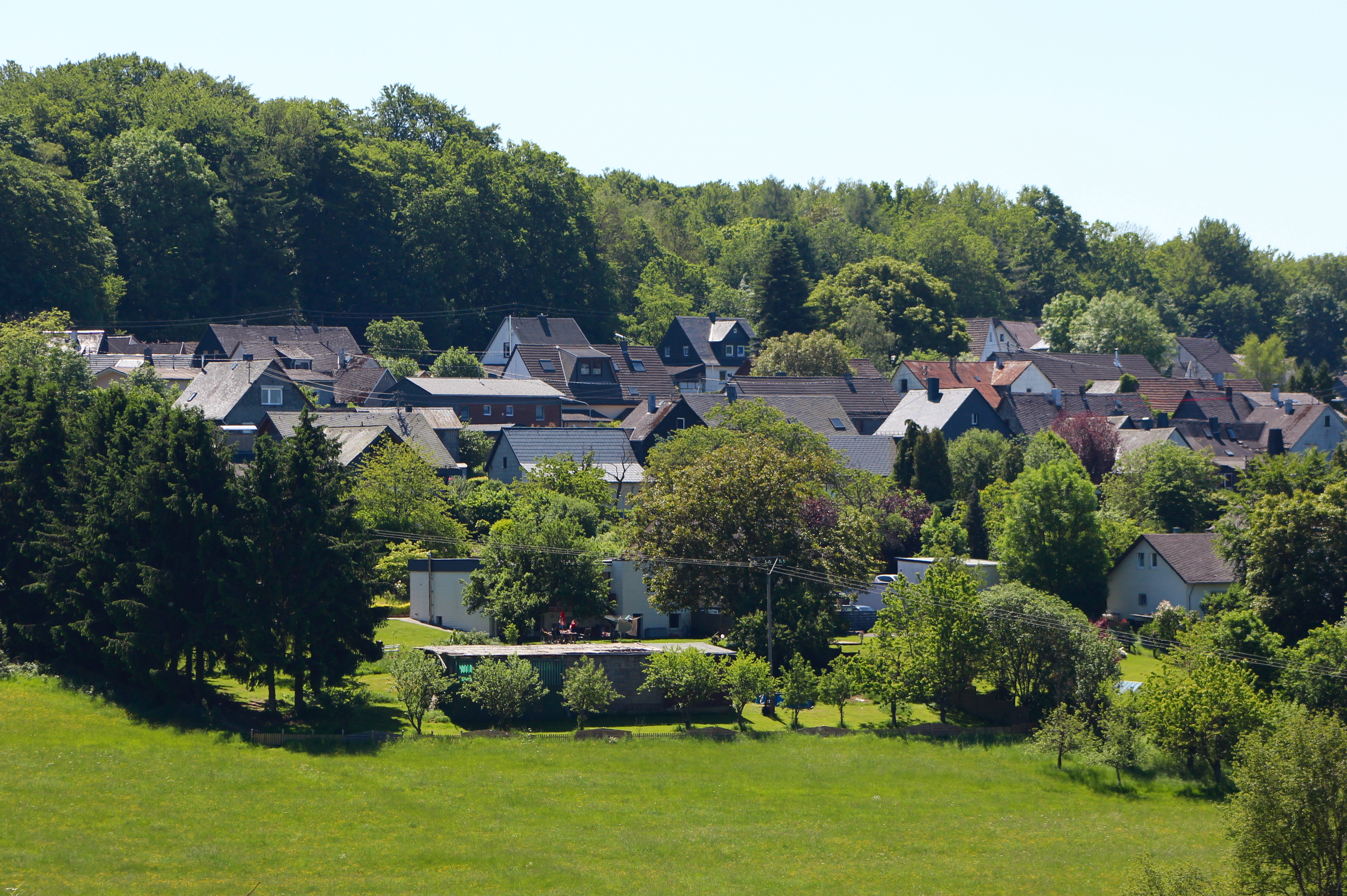

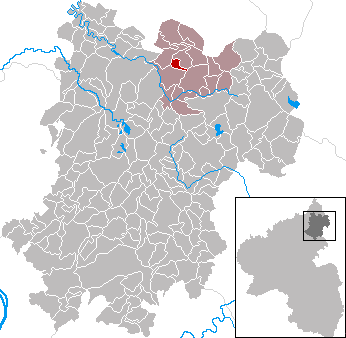
- Location of Bölsberg within Westerwaldkreis district
- Interactive map of Bölsberg
- Location within Germany Location within Rhineland-Palatinate
- Coordinates: 50°40′07″N 7°54′54″E
- Country: Germany
- State: Rhineland-Palatinate
- District: Westerwaldkreis
- Municipal assoc.: Bad Marienberg (Westerwald)

Government
  - Mayor (2019–24): Paul Gerhard Krüger

Area
  - Total: 1.46 km^{2} (0.56 sq mi)
- Elevation: 470 m (1,540 ft)

Population (2025-12-31)
  - Total: 221
  - Density: 151/km^{2} (392/sq mi)
- Time zone: UTC+01:00 (CET)
  - Summer (DST): UTC+02:00 (CEST)
- Postal codes: 57648
- Dialling codes: 02661
- Vehicle registration: WW
- Website: www.bad-marienberg.de

Bölsberg is an Ortsgemeinde – a municipality belonging to a Verbandsgemeinde – in the Westerwaldkreis in Rhineland-Palatinate, Germany.

== Geography ==
The municipality lies in the Westerwald between Limburg and Siegen. Bölsberg is the smallest municipality in the Verbandsgemeinde of Bad Marienberg, a kind of collective municipality. Its seat is in the like-named town.

== History ==
About 1300, Bölsberg had its first documentary mention.

== Politics ==
The municipal council is made up of 6 council members who were elected in a majority vote in a municipal election on 7 June 2009.

== Economy and infrastructure ==
=== Transport ===
North of the municipality runs Bundesstraße 414 leading from Driedorf-Hohenroth to Hachenburg. The nearest Autobahn interchange is Haiger/Burbach on the A 45 (Dortmund–Hanau), some 25 km away. The nearest InterCityExpress stop is the railway station at Montabaur on the Cologne-Frankfurt high-speed rail line.
