= Fehl-Ritzhausen =

- Municipality
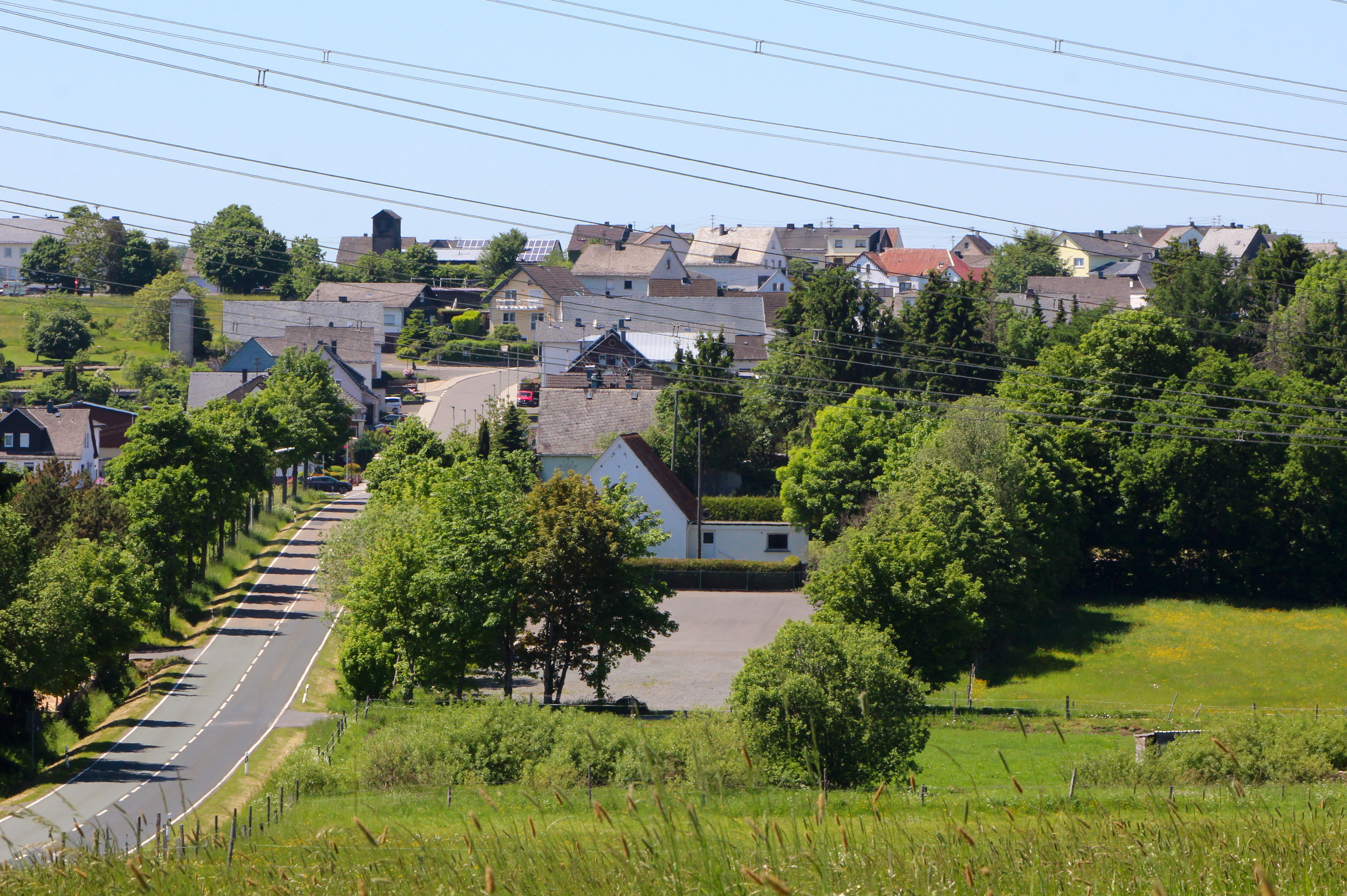

- Coat of arms

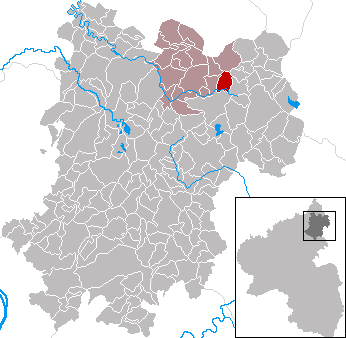
- Location of Fehl-Ritzhausen within Westerwaldkreis district
- Interactive map of Fehl-Ritzhausen
- Location within Germany Location within Rhineland-Palatinate
- Coordinates: 50°38′42″N 8°00′11″E
- Country: Germany
- State: Rhineland-Palatinate
- District: Westerwaldkreis
- Municipal assoc.: Bad Marienberg (Westerwald)

Government
  - Mayor (2019–24): Volker Uhr

Area
  - Total: 4.02 km^{2} (1.55 sq mi)
- Elevation: 498 m (1,634 ft)

Population (2025-12-31)
  - Total: 798
  - Density: 199/km^{2} (514/sq mi)
- Time zone: UTC+01:00 (CET)
  - Summer (DST): UTC+02:00 (CEST)
- Postal codes: 56472
- Dialling codes: 02661
- Vehicle registration: WW
- Website: Fehl-Ritzhausen

Fehl-Ritzhausen is an Ortsgemeinde – a municipality belonging to a Verbandsgemeinde – in the Westerwaldkreis in Rhineland-Palatinate, Germany.

== Geography ==
The municipality lies in the Westerwald between Limburg and Siegen. The river Nister, which is within the Sieg’s drainage basin, flows from east to west through the municipal area. Fehl-Ritzhausen belongs to the Verbandsgemeinde of Bad Marienberg, a kind of collective municipality. Its seat is in the like-named town.

== History ==
Fehl-Ritzhausen celebrated the 700th jubilee of its existence from 27 to 29 April 2007. The constituent municipality of Fehl had its first documentary mention on 6 January 1307 when Count Heinrich III of Nassau-Siegen and his wife Adelheid confirmed the existing revenue for the abbot and convent of the Marienstatt Cistercian Monastery in Velde (=Fehl) and Graynsiven (=Großseifen). The first mention by name of Roitzhusen comes from 27 October 1340; in his will, the knight Eberhard Daube von Selbach bequeathed to his widow Sophia a pension out of the village tithes that were owed him.

Both communities’ origins stretch, if anything, much further back into time, as the namings in the documents suggest. The placename ending –hausen hints at a possible founding in the 9th or 10th century. The Ritz – earlier also Roitz – part of the name most likely comes from Rode (“clearing” in German), which was often used as a word from the 9th to 12th centuries to describe settlements established on cleared woodland. Even older is Fehl. The name comes from the German word Feld (“field”), a word customarily used in the 6th century to describe settlements built on open land (“Gefilde”) or next to waterways. Indeed, Fehl’s inhabitants did settle on a waterway – the river Nister – whereas to the north, the Ritzhauseners lived under the Scheidchen castle’s protection, which shielded them from, among other things, the northwest wind which brought snow.

Belonging to the parish of Marienberg, 4 households were counted in Fehl in 1589 and 8 in Ritzhausen with all together some 50 persons. Towards the end of the Thirty Years' War, the population had sunk to 18. Fehl and Ritzhausen were first mentioned as two communities belonging together in 1592. In 1732, separate naming appears again, before an administrative reform within the County of Nassau-Beilstein once again united the two. Indeed, the Handbuch der Geographie und Statistik des Herzogthums Nassau from 1823 speaks explicitly of Fehl und Ritzhausen as zwei Dörfern, but nevertheless characterizes the two as a double municipality, listing their population figures as one – 213 Seelen (“souls”).

When brown coal pits opened in Höhn in 1746 and four years later in Stockhausen, Fehl-Ritzhauseners were offered another way to earn an income. Their home village was connected to the postal network in 1775, leading immediately to postal coaches and messengers making the village a base. Further important links to a broader civilization came with the municipality’s electrification in 1917 and, ten years earlier, the railway link through the Westerwaldquerbahn, which brought along with it a station in 1906-1907. The branchline from Fehl-Ritzhausen to Bad Marienberg, however, was abandoned in 1971. Exactly ten years later came the end for the Westerburg–(Fehl-Ritzhausen)–Rennerod stretch of the line. Since then, regular bus traffic has kept the municipality linked with the surrounding area.

Fehl-Ritzhausen managed to keep itself mostly unscathed by the destruction wrought by the Second World War. In late 1944 and early 1945, however, there were three Allied air raids on the municipality, their main target being the railway station. The enemy’s bombs only caused slight damage, and there was no loss of life among the officially reported 521 inhabitants (as of 1939). All the more painful was the loss of 38 men from Fehl-Ritzhausen, who as Wehrmacht soldiers fell in battle or went missing. Already in the First World War, the municipality had paid a high price in blood, losing 22 men. Some local families, such as Neeb, Schell, Schürg, Stalp and Steup were struck a second time in the Second World War. Owing to local men’s induction into the forces, there was a dearth of workers, and in both world wars, French and Russian prisoners of war were brought in to do labour.

On 27 March 1945, the municipality was occupied by United States troops without resistance.

== Politics ==
The municipal council is made up of 12 council members who were elected in a municipal election on 7 June 2009.

== Economy and infrastructure ==
=== Transport ===
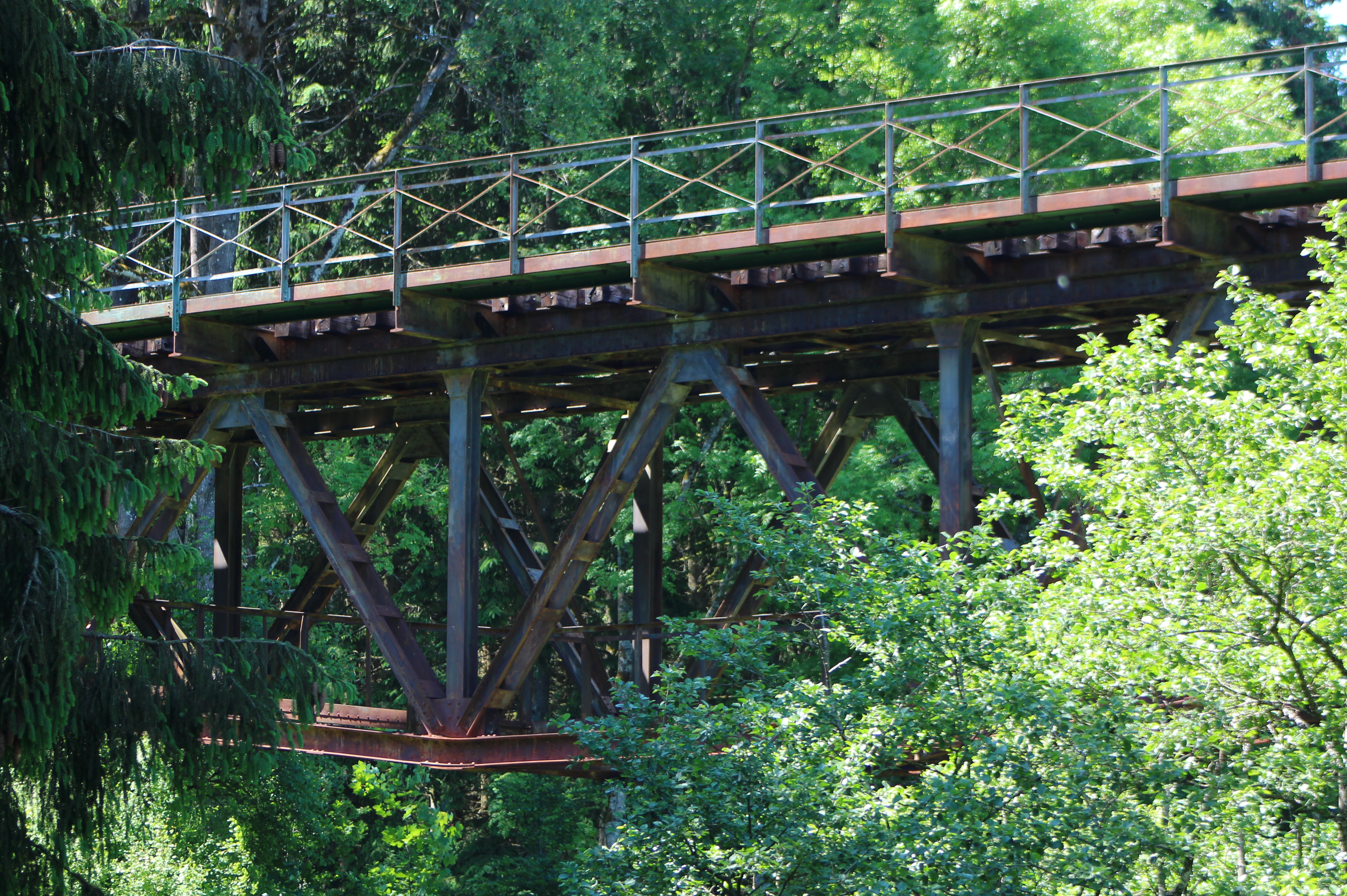
Bridge of former Cross Westerwald railway over the Nister

The local bus line 483, which runs from Bad Marienberg to Rennerod, connects Fehl-Ritzhausen to the public transport. The village is located in the zone number 456 of the transport association Verkehrsverbund Rhein-Mosel (VRM).

North of the municipality runs Bundesstraße 414 leading from Driedorf-Hohenroth to Hachenburg. The nearest Autobahn interchange is Haiger/Burbach on the A 45 (Dortmund–Hanau), some 22 km away.

Fehl-Ritzhausen train station, which nowadays is out of service, was located on the Cross Westerwald Railway (Montabaur - Wallmerod - Westerburg - Rennerod - Herborn) as well as the Erbach (Westerwald) - Fehl-Ritzhausen railway, now Erbach station is.renaimed to Nistertal-Bad Marienberg station. On Westerwaldquerbahn (Cross Westerwald railway) rides with railbikes take place organized by the interest group IG Westerwald Querbahn e. V., an extension to Höhn is in planning.

Nowadays local bus lines serve Fehl-Ritzhausen, it is located in the area of the transport association Verkehrsverbund Rhein-Mosel (VRM).

Access to the train service is on the stations Westerburg and Nsitertal / Bad Marienberg (RB90 / Westerwald-Sieg-Bahn, the nearest InterCityExpress stop is the railway station at Montabaur on the Cologne-Frankfurt high-speed rail line.
