= Nisterau =

- Municipality
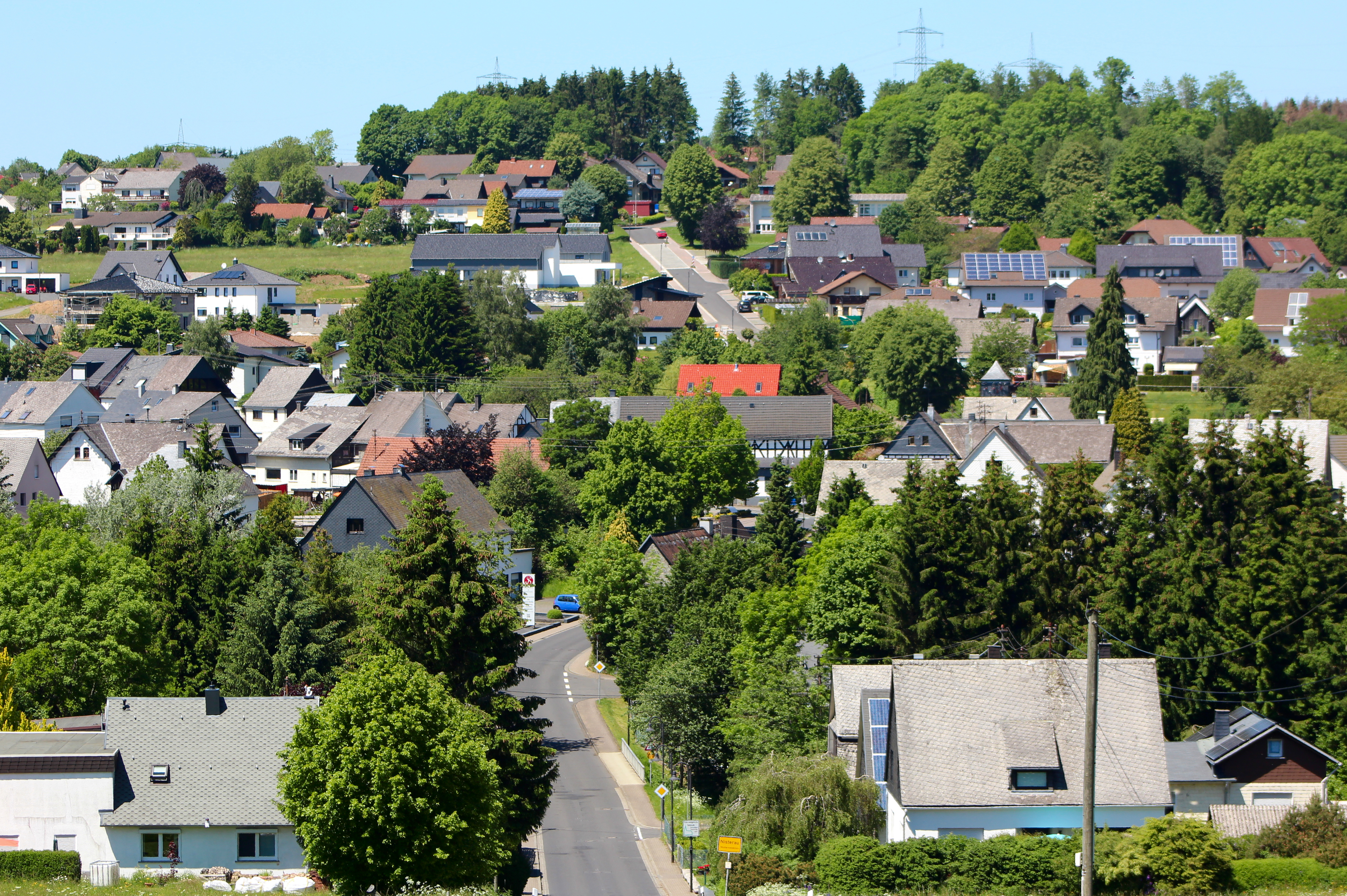

- Coat of arms

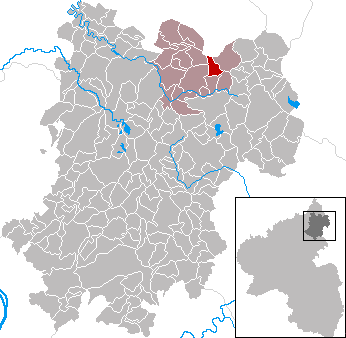
- Location of Nisterau within Westerwaldkreis district
- Interactive map of Nisterau
- Location within Germany Location within Rhineland-Palatinate
- Coordinates: 50°39′46″N 7°58′48″E
- Country: Germany
- State: Rhineland-Palatinate
- District: Westerwaldkreis
- Municipal assoc.: Bad Marienberg (Westerwald)
- Subdivisions: 2

Government
  - Mayor (2019–24): Markus Schell

Area
  - Total: 3.26 km^{2} (1.26 sq mi)
- Elevation: 500 m (1,600 ft)

Population (2025-12-31)
  - Total: 834
  - Density: 256/km^{2} (663/sq mi)
- Time zone: UTC+01:00 (CET)
  - Summer (DST): UTC+02:00 (CEST)
- Postal codes: 56472
- Dialling codes: 02661
- Vehicle registration: WW
- Website: www.nisterau.de

Nisterau is an Ortsgemeinde – a community belonging to a Verbandsgemeinde – in the Westerwaldkreis in Rhineland-Palatinate, Germany.

== Geography ==
=== Location ===
The community lies in the Westerwald between Limburg and Siegen. Nisterau belongs to the Verbandsgemeinde of Bad Marienberg, a kind of collective municipality. Its seat is in the like-named town.

=== Constituent communities ===
Nisterau's Ortsteile are Bach and Pfuhl.

== History ==
About 1300, Pfuhl had its first documentary mention, with Bach's name first appearing in writing in 1416. Both were once independent communities, but were united on 1 March 1969.

=== Religion ===
Fifty-six percent of Nisterauers are Evangelical and 14.7% are Catholic.

== Politics ==
=== Municipal council ===
The municipal council is made up of 12 council members who were elected in a majority vote in a municipal election on 13 June 2004.

=== Coat of arms ===
The tinctures and the charge of the lion in the community's arms refer to the community's former allegiance to the Duchy of Nassau and the later Prussian province of the same name. Also, the two waves symbolize the Große Nister and Kleine Nister, brooks that also form the community's natural boundaries.

== Economy and infrastructure ==
Nisterau is connected to the local bus lines 463, 470, 48 and 960. Running right near the community is Bundesstraße 414, leading from Driedorf-Hohenroth to Hachenburg. The nearest Autobahn interchange is Haiger/Burbach on the A 45 (Dortmund–Hanau), some 20 km away. The nearest InterCityExpress stop is the railway station at Montabaur on the Cologne-Frankfurt high-speed rail line.
