= Norken =

- Municipality
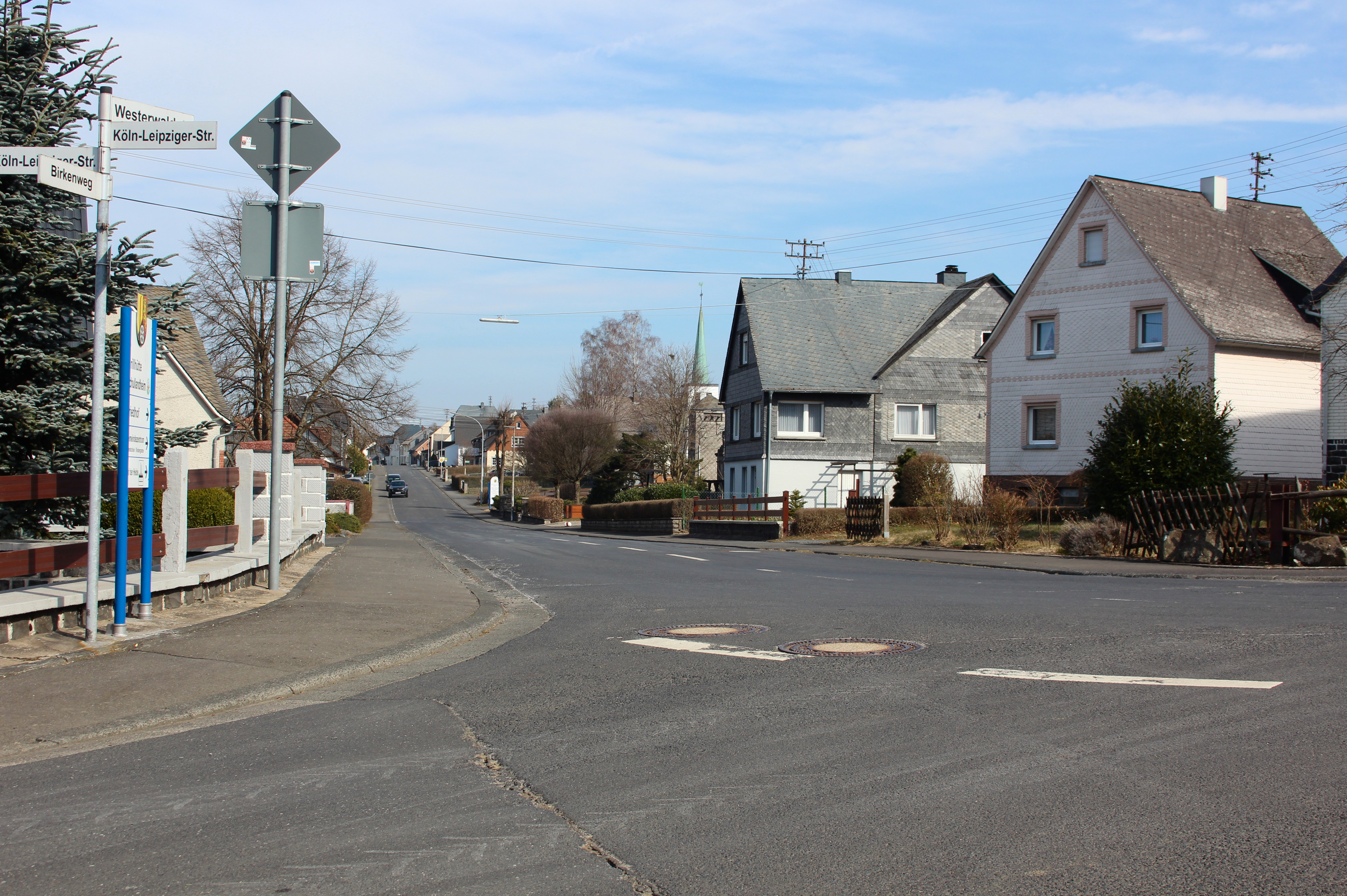

- Coat of arms

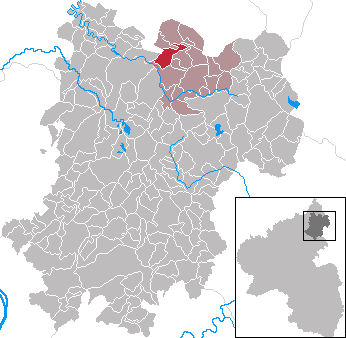
- Location of Norken within Westerwaldkreis district
- Interactive map of Norken
- Location within Germany Location within Rhineland-Palatinate
- Coordinates: 50°40′22″N 7°53′52″E
- Country: Germany
- State: Rhineland-Palatinate
- District: Westerwaldkreis
- Municipal assoc.: Bad Marienberg (Westerwald)

Government
  - Mayor (2019–24): Simone Jungbluth

Area
  - Total: 5.99 km^{2} (2.31 sq mi)
- Elevation: 458 m (1,503 ft)

Population (2025-12-31)
  - Total: 978
  - Density: 163/km^{2} (423/sq mi)
- Time zone: UTC+01:00 (CET)
  - Summer (DST): UTC+02:00 (CEST)
- Postal codes: 57629
- Dialling codes: 02661
- Vehicle registration: WW
- Website: www.norken.de

Norken is an Ortsgemeinde – a community belonging to a Verbandsgemeinde – in the Westerwaldkreis in Rhineland-Palatinate, Germany.

== Geography ==
The community lies in the Westerwald between Limburg and Siegen on the boundary with North Rhine-Westphalia. The community is also between the Große Nister and Kleine Nister. Norken belongs to the Verbandsgemeinde of Bad Marienberg, a kind of collective municipality. Its seat is in the like-named town.

== History ==
In 1262, Norken had its first documentary mention.

== Politics ==
The municipal council is made up of 16 council members who were elected in a majority vote in a municipal election on 13 June 2004.

== Regular events ==
At Easter, the traditional Eierschibbeln – a kind of Easter egg roll – is celebrated.

== Economy and infrastructure ==
Norken is connected to the public bus transport through the lines 455, 483, 960 and 962 and located in the area of the transport association Verkehrsverbund Rhein-Mosel (VRM). Running right near the community is Bundesstraße 414, leading from Herborn to Altenkirchen. The nearest Autobahn interchanges are in Siegen and Wilnsdorf on the A 45 (Dortmund–Hanau), some 26 km away. The nearest InterCityExpress stop is the railway station at Montabaur on the Cologne-Frankfurt high-speed rail line.
