= Bad Marienberg (Verbandsgemeinde) =

- Verbandsgemeinde
- Location of Bad Marienberg within Westerwaldkreis district
- Interactive map of Bad Marienberg
- Location within Germany Location within Rhineland-Palatinate
- Coordinates: 50°39′N 7°57′E
- Country: Germany
- State: Rhineland-Palatinate
- District: Westerwaldkreis
- Seat: Bad Marienberg
- Subdivisions: 18 municipalities

Area
  - Total: 83.16 km^{2} (32.11 sq mi)

Population (2025-12-31)
  - Total: 19,651
  - Density: 236.3/km^{2} (612.0/sq mi)
- Time zone: UTC+01:00 (CET)
  - Summer (DST): UTC+02:00 (CEST)
- Website: www.bad-marienberg.de

Bad Marienberg is a Verbandsgemeinde ("collective municipality") in the district Westerwaldkreis, in Rhineland-Palatinate, Germany. The seat of the Verbandsgemeinde is in Bad Marienberg.

The Verbandsgemeinde Bad Marienberg consists of the following Ortsgemeinden ("local municipalities"):

1. Bad Marienberg
2. Bölsberg
3. Dreisbach
4. Fehl-Ritzhausen
5. Großseifen
6. Hahn bei Marienberg
7. Hardt
8. Hof
9. Kirburg
10. Langenbach bei Kirburg
11. Lautzenbrücken
12. Mörlen
13. Neunkhausen
14. Nisterau
15. Nistertal
16. Norken
17. Stockhausen-Illfurth
18. Unnau
