= Dreisbach, Westerwaldkreis =

Dreisbach
- Municipality
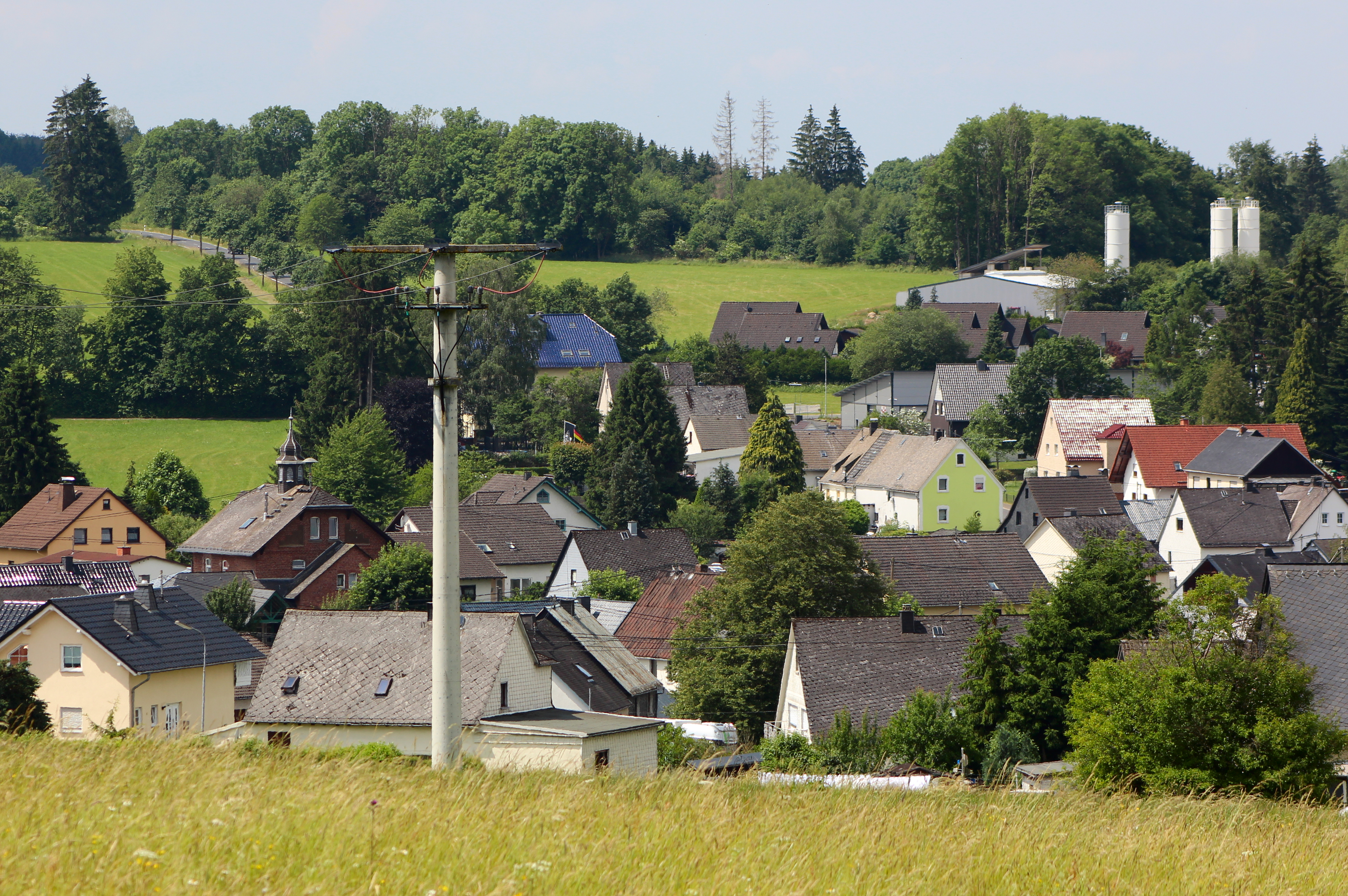

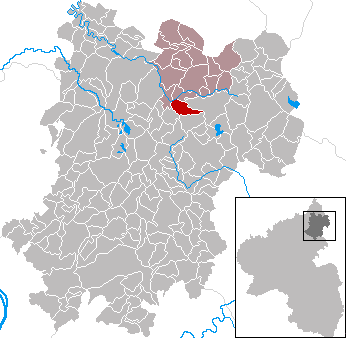
- Location of Dreisbach within Westerwaldkreis district
- Interactive map of Dreisbach
- Location within Germany Location within Rhineland-Palatinate
- Coordinates: 50°37′00″N 7°55′54″E
- Country: Germany
- State: Rhineland-Palatinate
- District: Westerwaldkreis
- Municipal assoc.: Bad Marienberg (Westerwald)

Government
  - Mayor (2019–24): Andrea Theis

Area
  - Total: 4.62 km^{2} (1.78 sq mi)
- Elevation: 440 m (1,440 ft)

Population (2025-12-31)
  - Total: 574
  - Density: 124/km^{2} (322/sq mi)
- Time zone: UTC+01:00 (CET)
  - Summer (DST): UTC+02:00 (CEST)
- Postal codes: 56472
- Dialling codes: 02661
- Vehicle registration: WW
- Website: www.bad-marienberg.de

Dreisbach is an Ortsgemeinde – a municipality belonging to a Verbandsgemeinde – in the Westerwaldkreis in Rhineland-Palatinate, Germany.

== Geography ==
The community lies in the Westerwald between Limburg and Siegen. The river Nister, which is part of the Sieg’s drainage basin flows from east to west through the municipal area. Dreisbach belongs to the Verbandsgemeinde of Bad Marienberg, a kind of collective municipality. Its seat is in the like-named town.

== History ==
In 1252, Dreisbach had its first documentary mention.

== Politics ==
The municipal council is made up of 12 council members who were elected in a majority vote in a municipal election on 7 June 2009.

== Economy and infrastructure ==
=== Transport ===
Dreisbach's connection to the public transport is through the local bus lines 463, 484, 960, 962, 965 and 967. South of the community runs Bundesstraße 255, which leads from Montabaur to Herborn. The nearest Autobahn interchange is Montabaur on the A 3 (Cologne–Frankfurt), some 22 km away. The nearest InterCityExpress stop is the railway station at Montabaur on the Cologne-Frankfurt high-speed rail line.
