= Lautzenbrücken =

- Municipality
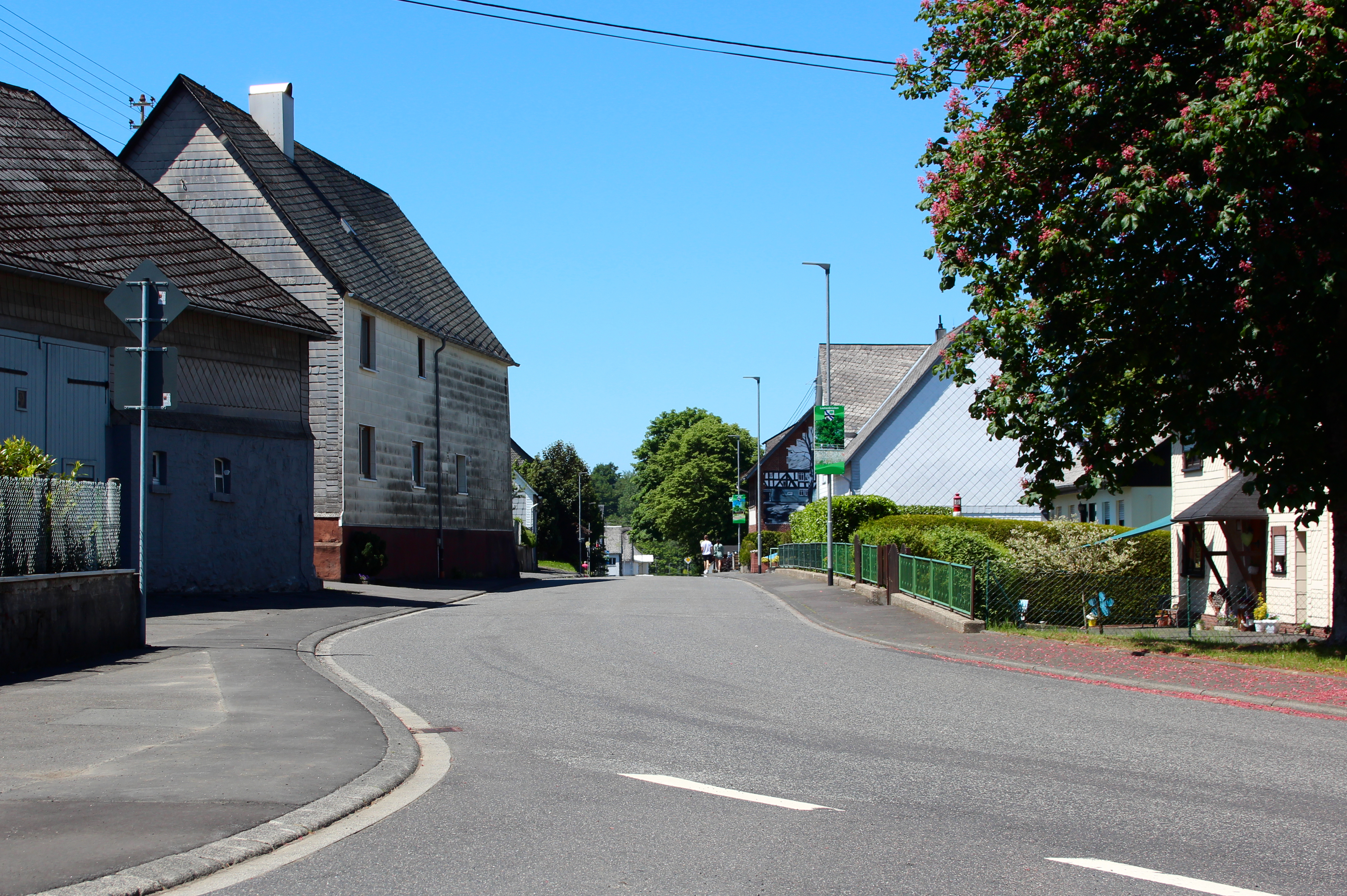

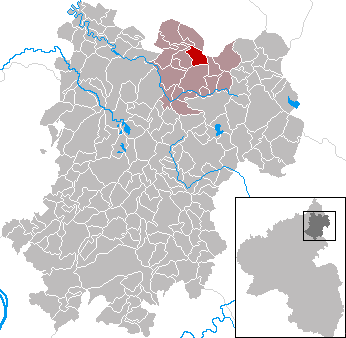
- Location of Lautzenbrücken within Westerwaldkreis district
- Interactive map of Lautzenbrücken
- Location within Germany Location within Rhineland-Palatinate
- Coordinates: 50°40′25″N 7°57′52″E
- Country: Germany
- State: Rhineland-Palatinate
- District: Westerwaldkreis
- Municipal assoc.: Bad Marienberg (Westerwald)
- Subdivisions: 2

Government
  - Mayor (2019–24): Karsten Lucke

Area
  - Total: 4.28 km^{2} (1.65 sq mi)
- Elevation: 501 m (1,644 ft)

Population (2025-12-31)
  - Total: 455
  - Density: 106/km^{2} (275/sq mi)
- Time zone: UTC+01:00 (CET)
  - Summer (DST): UTC+02:00 (CEST)
- Postal codes: 56472
- Dialling codes: 02661
- Vehicle registration: WW
- Website: Gemeinde Lautzenbrücken

Lautzenbrücken is an Ortsgemeinde – a community belonging to a Verbandsgemeinde – in the Westerwaldkreis in Rhineland-Palatinate, Germany.

== Geography ==
=== Location ===
The community lies in the Westerwald between Limburg and Siegen on the boundary with North Rhine-Westphalia. Lautzenbrücken belongs to the Verbandsgemeinde of Bad Marienberg, a kind of collective municipality. Its seat is in the like-named town.

=== Constituent communities ===
Lautzenbrücken has two outlying centres named Hohensayn und Eisenkaute.

== History ==
In 1262, Lautzenbrücken had its first documentary mention as Luytzebrucke.

== Politics ==
The municipal council is made up of 8 council members who were elected in a majority vote in a municipal election on 13 June 2004.

=== Federal elections ===
Results of the 2025 German federal election in Lautzenbrücken:

2025 German federal election
	percent
AfD	48.4%
CDU	17.6%
SPD	12.4%
BSW	7.2%
FDP	5.9%
Greens	3.9%
Die Linke	2.6%
others	2.0%

== Economy and infrastructure ==
South of the community runs Bundesstraße 414, leading from Driedorf-Hohenroth to Hachenburg. The nearest Autobahn interchanges are in Siegen and Wilnsdorf on the A 45 (Dortmund–Hanau), some 20 km away. The nearest InterCityExpress stop is the railway station at Montabaur on the Cologne-Frankfurt high-speed rail line.
