= Hahn bei Marienberg =

- Municipality
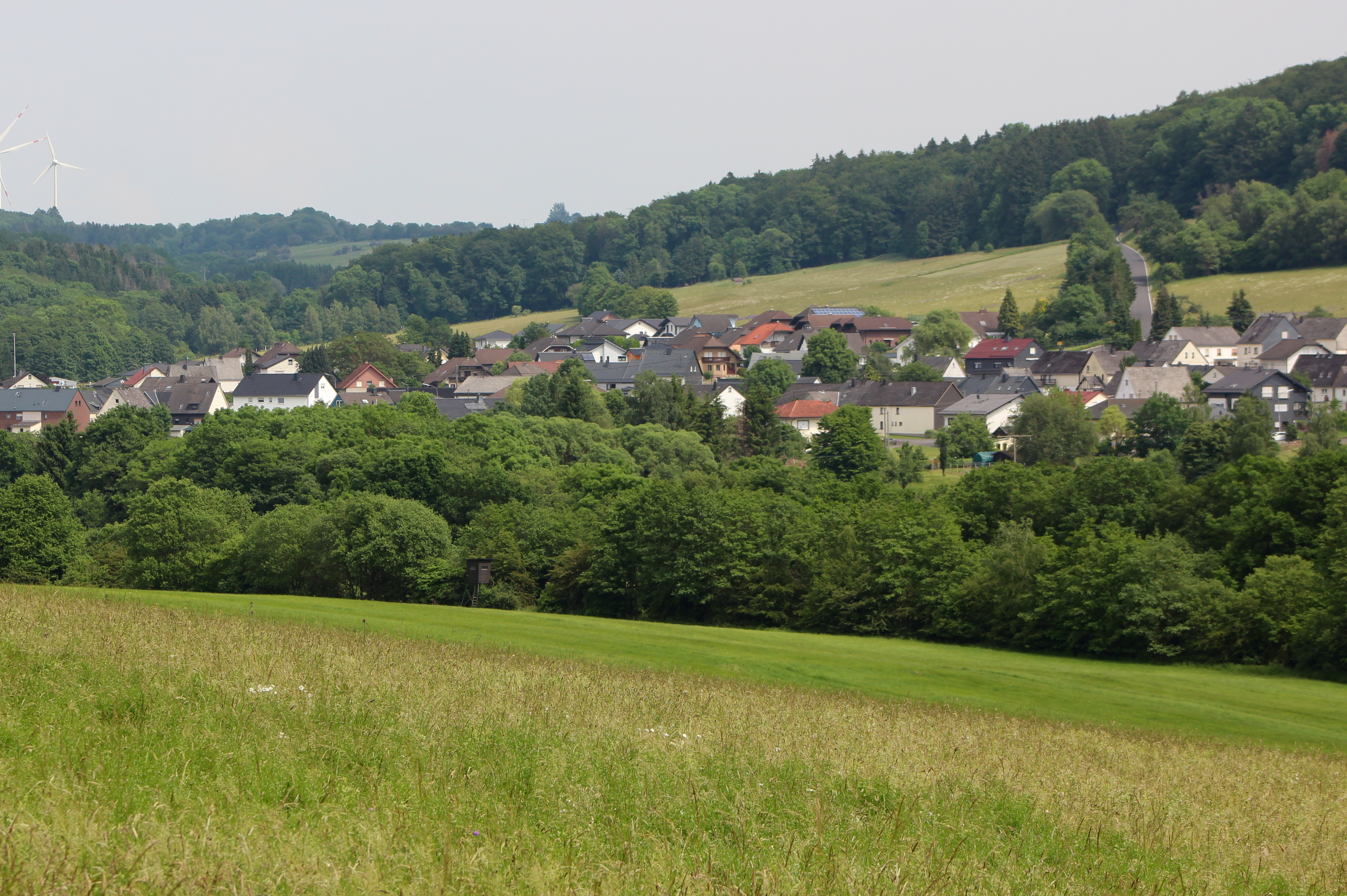

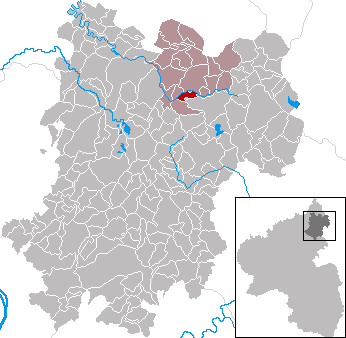
- Location of Hahn bei Marienberg within Westerwaldkreis district
- Interactive map of Hahn bei Marienberg
- Location within Germany Location within Rhineland-Palatinate
- Coordinates: 50°37′58″N 7°56′28″E
- Country: Germany
- State: Rhineland-Palatinate
- District: Westerwaldkreis
- Municipal assoc.: Bad Marienberg (Westerwald)

Government
  - Mayor (2019–24): Roland Reis

Area
  - Total: 2.20 km^{2} (0.85 sq mi)
- Elevation: 390 m (1,280 ft)

Population (2025-12-31)
  - Total: 453
  - Density: 206/km^{2} (533/sq mi)
- Time zone: UTC+01:00 (CET)
  - Summer (DST): UTC+02:00 (CEST)
- Postal codes: 56472
- Dialling codes: 02661
- Vehicle registration: WW
- Website: www.bad-marienberg.de

Hahn bei Marienberg is an Ortsgemeinde – a community belonging to a Verbandsgemeinde – in the Westerwaldkreis in Rhineland-Palatinate, Germany.

== Geography ==
The community lies in the Westerwald between Limburg und Siegen. The river Nister, which is part of the Sieg drainage basin, flows east to west through the municipal area. Hahn bei Marienberg belongs to the Verbandsgemeinde of Bad Marienberg, a kind of collective municipality. Its seat is in the like-named town.

== History ==
In the 9th century, Hahn bei Marienberg had its first documentary mention.

== Politics ==
The municipal council is made up of 10 council members who were elected in a majority vote in a municipal election on 7 June 2009.

== Economy and infrastructure ==
South of the community runs Bundesstraße 255, leading from Montabaur to Herborn. The nearest Autobahn interchange is Montabaur on the A 3 (Cologne–Frankfurt), some 22 km away. The nearest InterCityExpress stop is the railway station at Montabaur on the Cologne-Frankfurt high-speed rail line.
