= Hof, Rhineland-Palatinate =

Hof
- Municipality
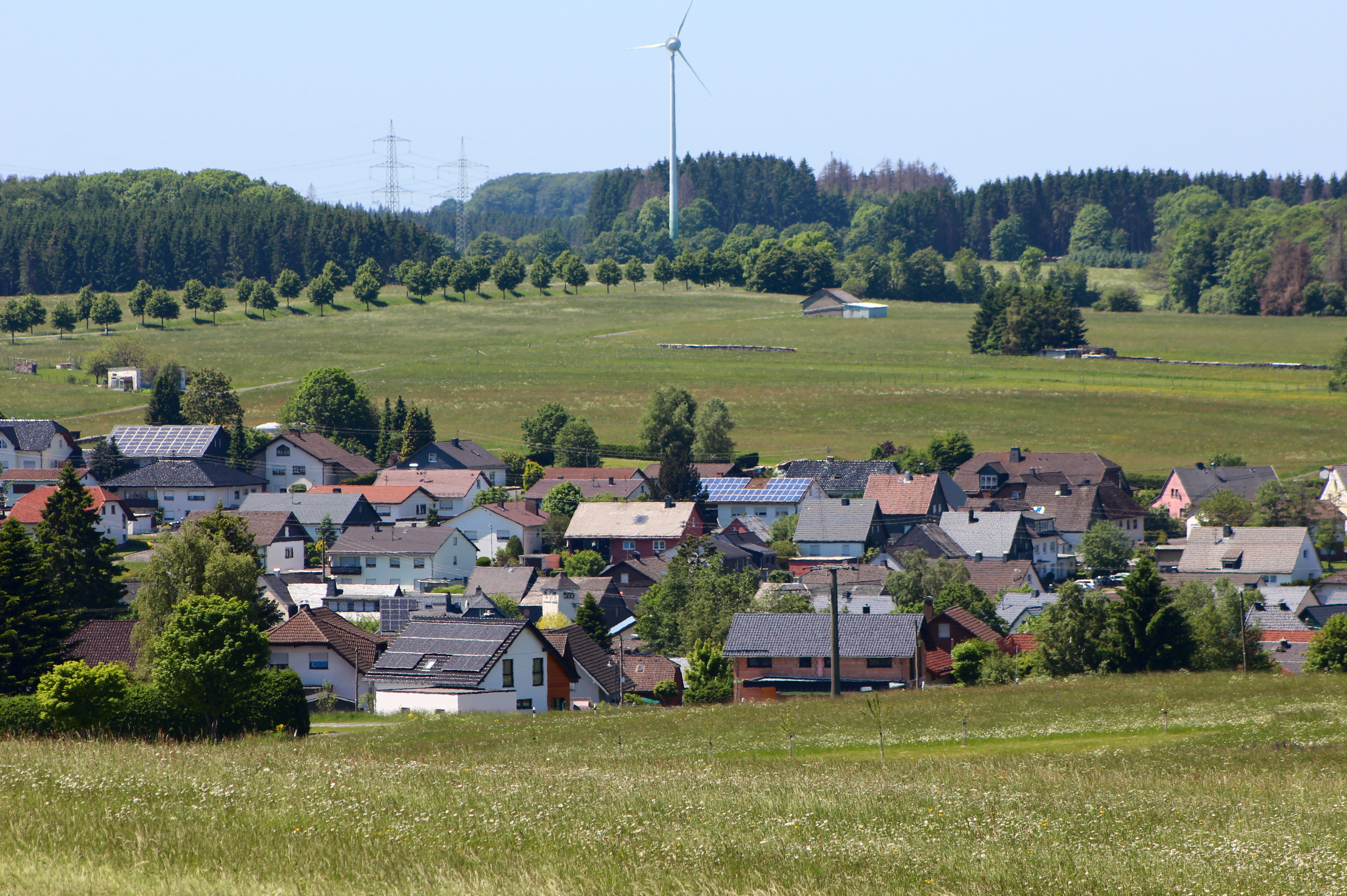

- Coat of arms

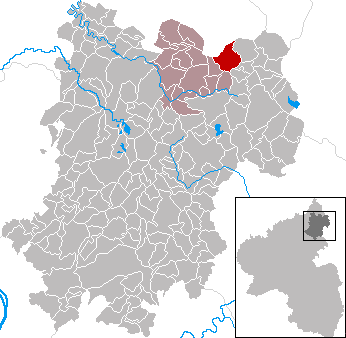
- Location of Hof within Westerwaldkreis district
- Interactive map of Hof
- Location within Germany Location within Rhineland-Palatinate
- Coordinates: 50°40′10″N 8°00′55″E
- Country: Germany
- State: Rhineland-Palatinate
- District: Westerwaldkreis
- Municipal assoc.: Bad Marienberg (Westerwald)

Government
  - Mayor (2019–24): Jochen Becker

Area
  - Total: 8.08 km^{2} (3.12 sq mi)
- Elevation: 525 m (1,722 ft)

Population (2025-12-31)
  - Total: 1,320
  - Density: 163/km^{2} (423/sq mi)
- Time zone: UTC+01:00 (CET)
  - Summer (DST): UTC+02:00 (CEST)
- Postal codes: 56472
- Dialling codes: 02661
- Vehicle registration: WW
- Website: www.bad-marienberg.de

Hof (German pronunciation: [hoːf]) is an Ortsgemeinde – a municipality belonging to a Verbandsgemeinde – in the Westerwaldkreis in Rhineland-Palatinate, Germany.

== Geography ==
The municipality lies in the Westerwald between Limburg and Siegen on the boundary with North Rhine-Westphalia. The Schwarze Nister, which belongs to the Sieg drainage basin, flows through the municipal area. Hof belongs to the Verbandsgemeinde of Bad Marienberg, a kind of collective municipality. Its seat is in the like-named town.

Hof lies in a hollow at the foot of the Westerwald's third highest elevation (Salzburger Kopf, 653 m) with a mean elevation of 550 m on the old Cologne-Leipzig trade road.

== History ==
The municipality that exists today, which had its first documentary mention in 1048, has grown over the last 50 years from a former agriculturally based place to a flourishing commercial centre.

From the 14th to the 19th century there was already an important chapel in Hof.

In 1589, there were 18 families in Hof, who had fallen in number by 1648 – after the Thirty Years' War – to only 3 families.

When Johann Baptista von Langenbach, called Sassenroth, donated a parcel of land to the village in the 16th century, the municipality's first school was built there.

By 1607, the number of families had risen once again to 15, and the 27 horses counted there in 1610 might point to a great number of coachmen in the village.

In 1825, the population figure was 537. Marienberg counted, on the other hand, only 388 inhabitants that same year.

At the turn of the 20th century, Hof counted 702 inhabitants, and in 1960, the one thousandth inhabitant was welcomed.

Today, Hof is a village with more than 1,400 people and more than 600 jobs.

== Politics ==
The municipal council is made up of 16 council members who were elected in a majority vote in a municipal election on 13 June 2004.

== Economy and infrastructure ==
=== Transport ===
Hof has access to the public transport through the local bus lines 470 and 966 and is located in the area of the transport association Verkehrsverbund Rhein-Mosel (VRM). Right through the municipality runs Bundesstraße 414, leading from Hohenroth to Hachenburg. The nearest Autobahn interchange is Haiger-Burbach on the A 45 (Dortmund–Gießen), some 17 km away. The nearest InterCityExpress stop is the railway station at Montabaur on the Cologne-Frankfurt high-speed rail line.
