= German-Arab Friendship Association =

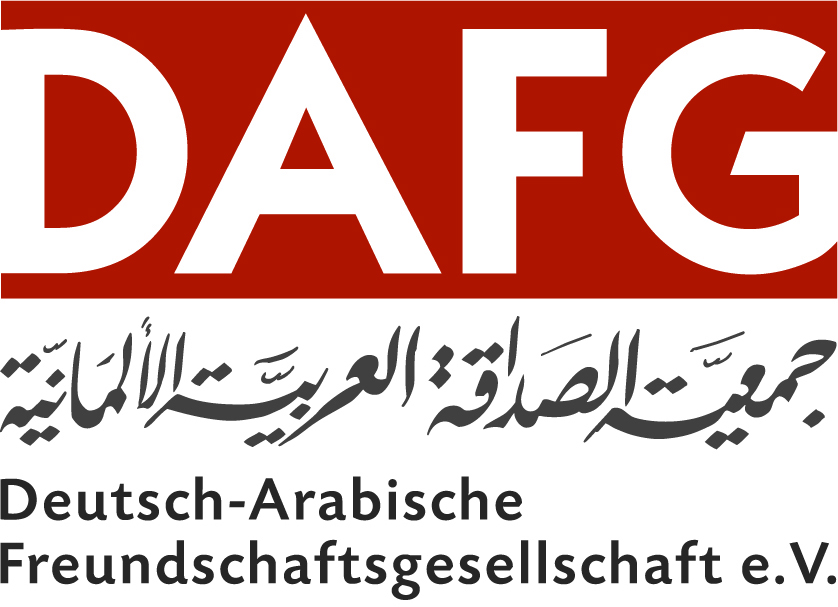
- Founded: 2007
- Purpose: Arab World, Politics, Culture, Economics
- Location: Berlin, Germany
- Region served: Germany, Arab World
- Key people: Dr. Otto Wiesheu (President)
- Website: www.dafg.eu

The German-Arab Friendship Association (DAFG) (German: DAFG - Deutsch-Arabische Freundschaftsgesellschaft e.V.) is a Berlin-based non-profit association established in 2007. It focuses on building economic, political, cultural and media bridges between Germany and countries in the Arab World. The DAFG is a non-partisan initiative and does not take a role as political actor or take sides in political conflicts. The DAFG works with civil society organisations, political foundations as well as government agencies and the Arab states’ embassies in Germany.
