= Kirburg =

- Municipality
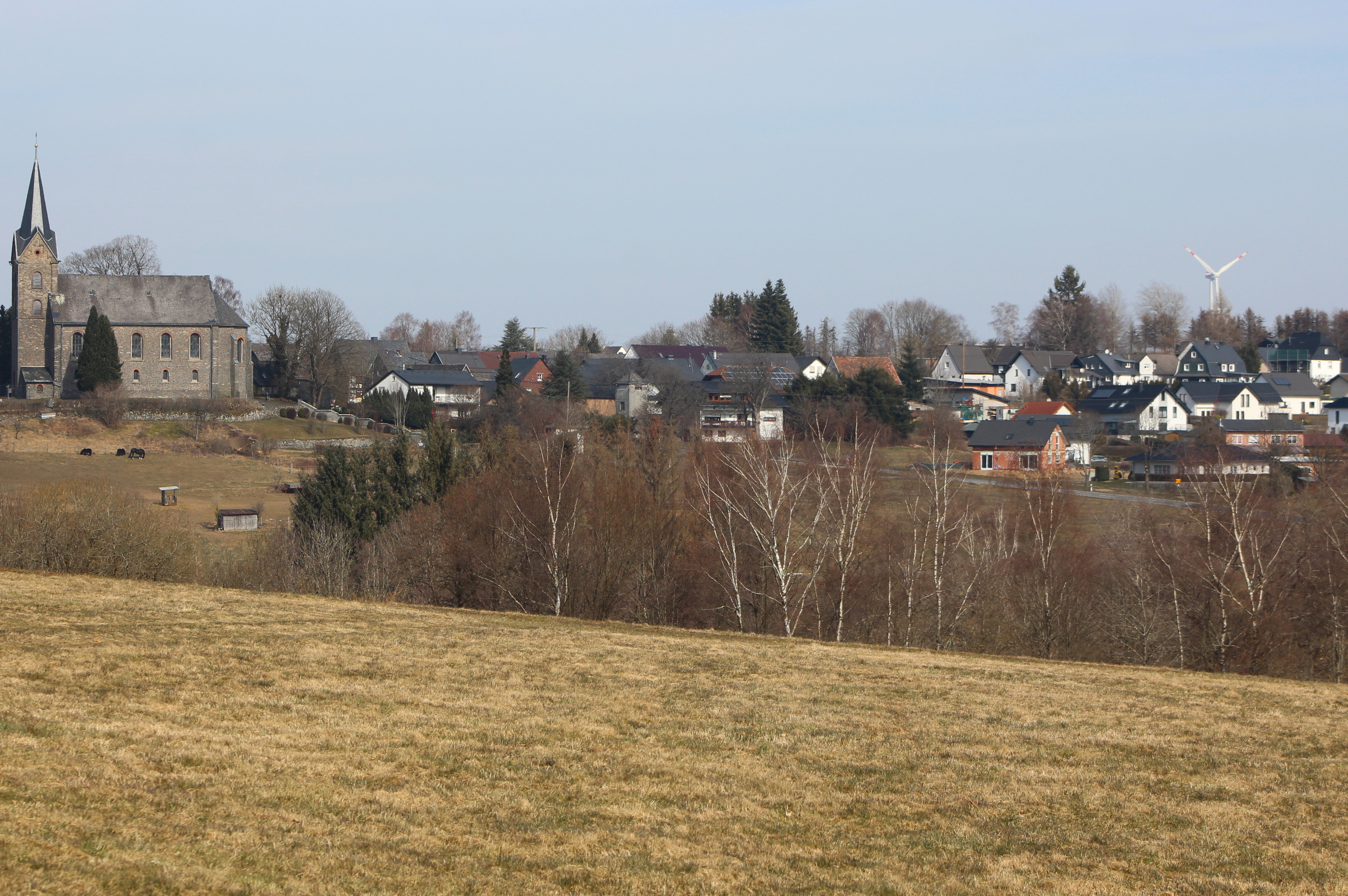

- Coat of arms

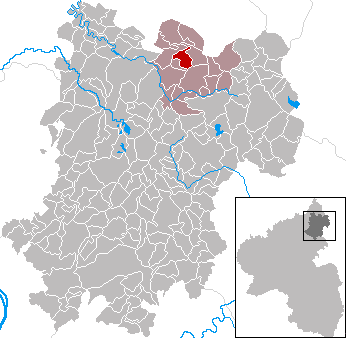
- Location of Kirburg within Westerwaldkreis district
- Interactive map of Kirburg
- Location within Germany Location within Rhineland-Palatinate
- Coordinates: 50°40′39″N 7°55′24″E
- Country: Germany
- State: Rhineland-Palatinate
- District: Westerwaldkreis
- Municipal assoc.: Bad Marienberg (Westerwald)

Government
  - Mayor (2019–24): Janosch Becker

Area
  - Total: 4.05 km^{2} (1.56 sq mi)
- Elevation: 482 m (1,581 ft)

Population (2025-12-31)
  - Total: 592
  - Density: 146/km^{2} (379/sq mi)
- Time zone: UTC+01:00 (CET)
  - Summer (DST): UTC+02:00 (CEST)
- Postal codes: 57629
- Dialling codes: 02661
- Vehicle registration: WW
- Website: www.bad-marienberg.de

Kirburg (German pronunciation: [ˈkɪʁbʊʁk]) is an Ortsgemeinde – a municipality belonging to a Verbandsgemeinde – in the Westerwaldkreis in Rhineland-Palatinate, Germany.

== Geography ==
The municipality lies in the Westerwald between Limburg und Siegen. The Wäschebach, which belongs to the Sieg drainage basin, flows through the municipal area. Kirburg belongs to the Verbandsgemeinde of Bad Marienberg, a kind of collective municipality. Its seat is in the like-named town.

== History ==
In 1215, Kirburg had its first documentary mention.

== Politics ==
The municipal council is made up of 12 council members who were elected in a majority vote in a municipal election on 13 June 2004.

== Economy and infrastructure ==
Running right through the municipality is Bundesstraße 414, leading from Driedorf-Hohenroth to Hachenburg. The nearest Autobahn interchange is Haiger/Burbach on the A 45 (Dortmund–Hanau), some 25 km away. The nearest InterCityExpress stop is the railway station at Montabaur on the Cologne-Frankfurt high-speed rail line.
