= Unnau =

- Municipality
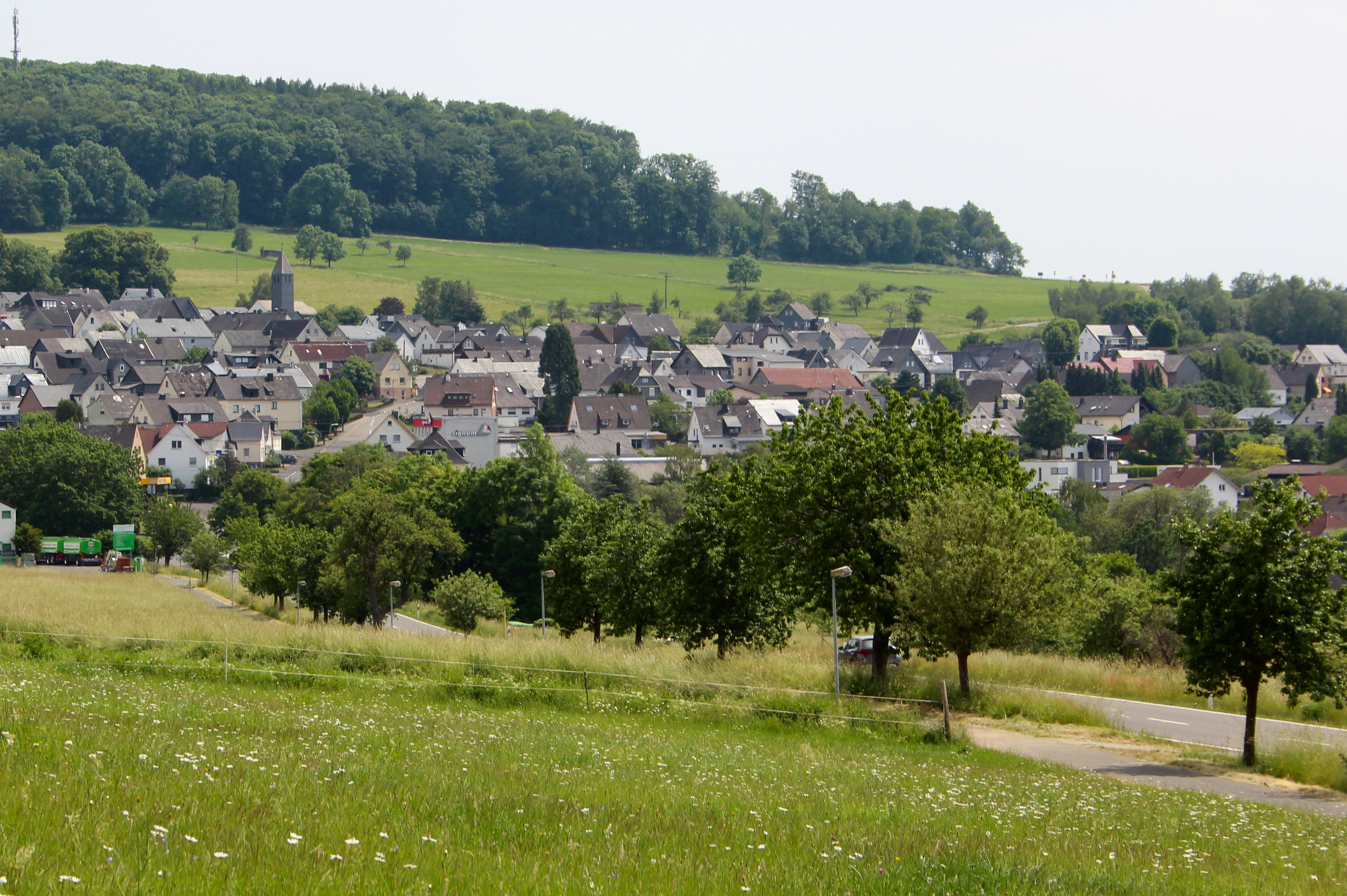

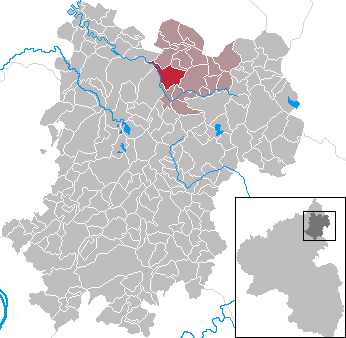
- Location of Unnau within Westerwaldkreis district
- Interactive map of Unnau
- Location within Germany Location within Rhineland-Palatinate
- Coordinates: 50°38′55″N 7°54′30″E
- Country: Germany
- State: Rhineland-Palatinate
- District: Westerwaldkreis
- Municipal assoc.: Bad Marienberg (Westerwald)
- Subdivisions: 3

Government
  - Mayor (2019–24): Iris Wagner

Area
  - Total: 8.14 km^{2} (3.14 sq mi)
- Elevation: 390 m (1,280 ft)

Population (2025-12-31)
  - Total: 1,977
  - Density: 243/km^{2} (629/sq mi)
- Time zone: UTC+01:00 (CET)
  - Summer (DST): UTC+02:00 (CEST)
- Postal codes: 57648
- Dialling codes: 02661
- Vehicle registration: WW
- Website: www.bad-marienberg.de

Unnau is an Ortsgemeinde – a community belonging to a Verbandsgemeinde – in the Westerwaldkreis in Rhineland-Palatinate, Germany.

== Geography ==
The community lies in the Westerwald between Limburg and Siegen. Through the community flows the Große Nister. Unnau belongs to the Verbandsgemeinde of Bad Marienberg, a kind of collective municipality. Its seat is in the like-named town.

== History ==
In 1000, Unnau had its first documentary mention.

In 1969 came the merger of the until then three autonomous communities of Unnau, Korb and Stangenrod into the new greater community of Unnau.

== Politics ==
The municipal council is made up of 16 council members who were elected in a majority vote in a municipal election on 13 June 2004.

== Economy and infrastructure ==
=== Transport ===
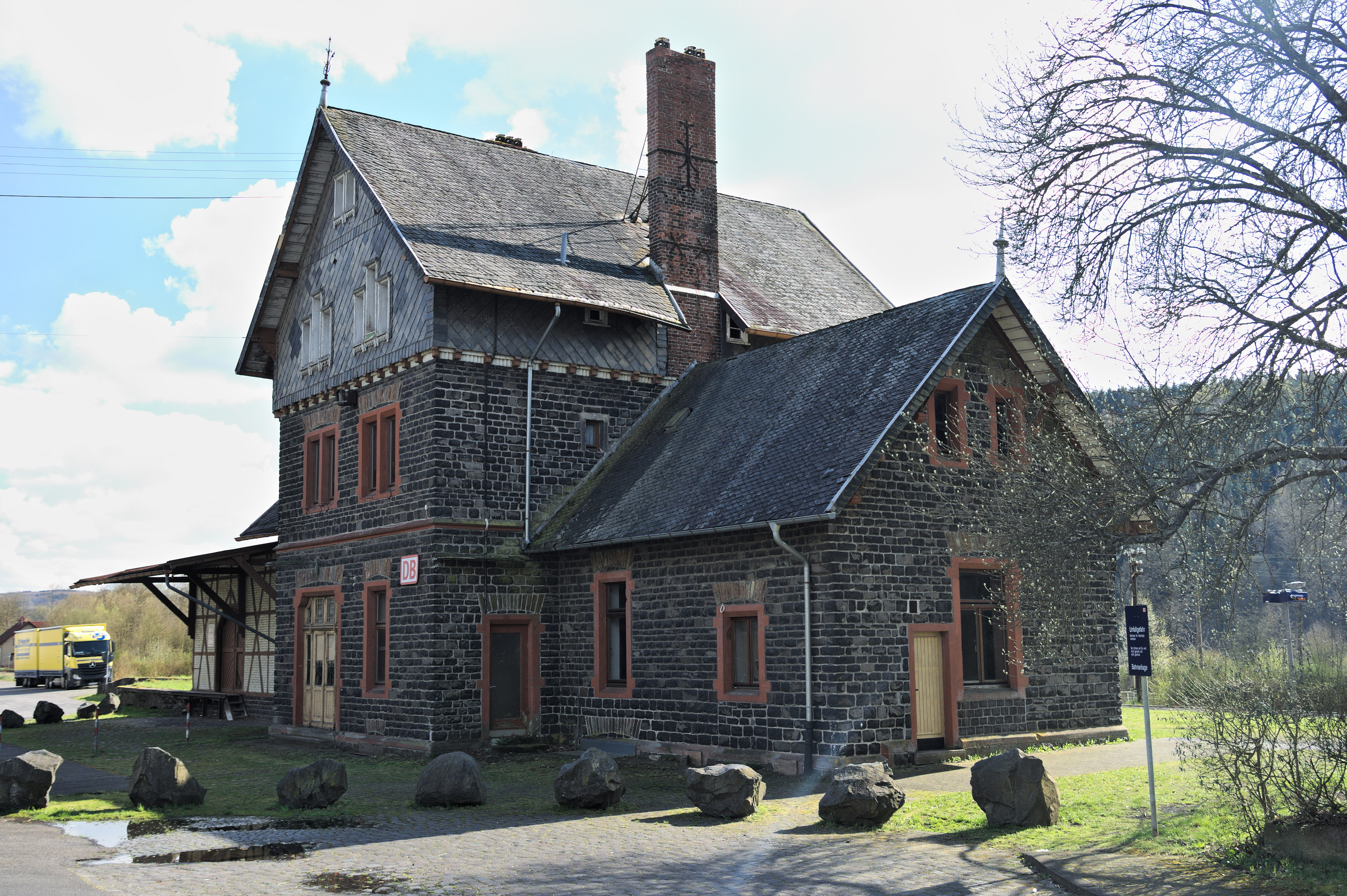
Unnau-Korb train stop

The local bus line 969 connects Unnau to the public bus transport. North of the community runs Bundesstraße 414, leading from Hohenroth to Hachenburg. The nearest Autobahn interchange is Haiger/Burbach on the A 45 (Dortmund–Hanau), some 24 km away. Unnau lies on the RB99Westerwald-Sieg-Bahn of DreiLänderBahn, a compamy section of Hessische Landesbahn (HLB) from Limburg via Au (Sieg) to Siegen Hbf. From there, the cities of Cologne, Koblenz, Frankfurt am Main and Wiesbaden may be reached directly. Unnau is located in the area of the transport association Verkehrsverbund Rhein-Mosel (VRM), zone 447. The nearest InterCityExpress stop is the railway station at Montabaur on the Cologne-Frankfurt high-speed rail line.
