= Großseifen =

- Municipality
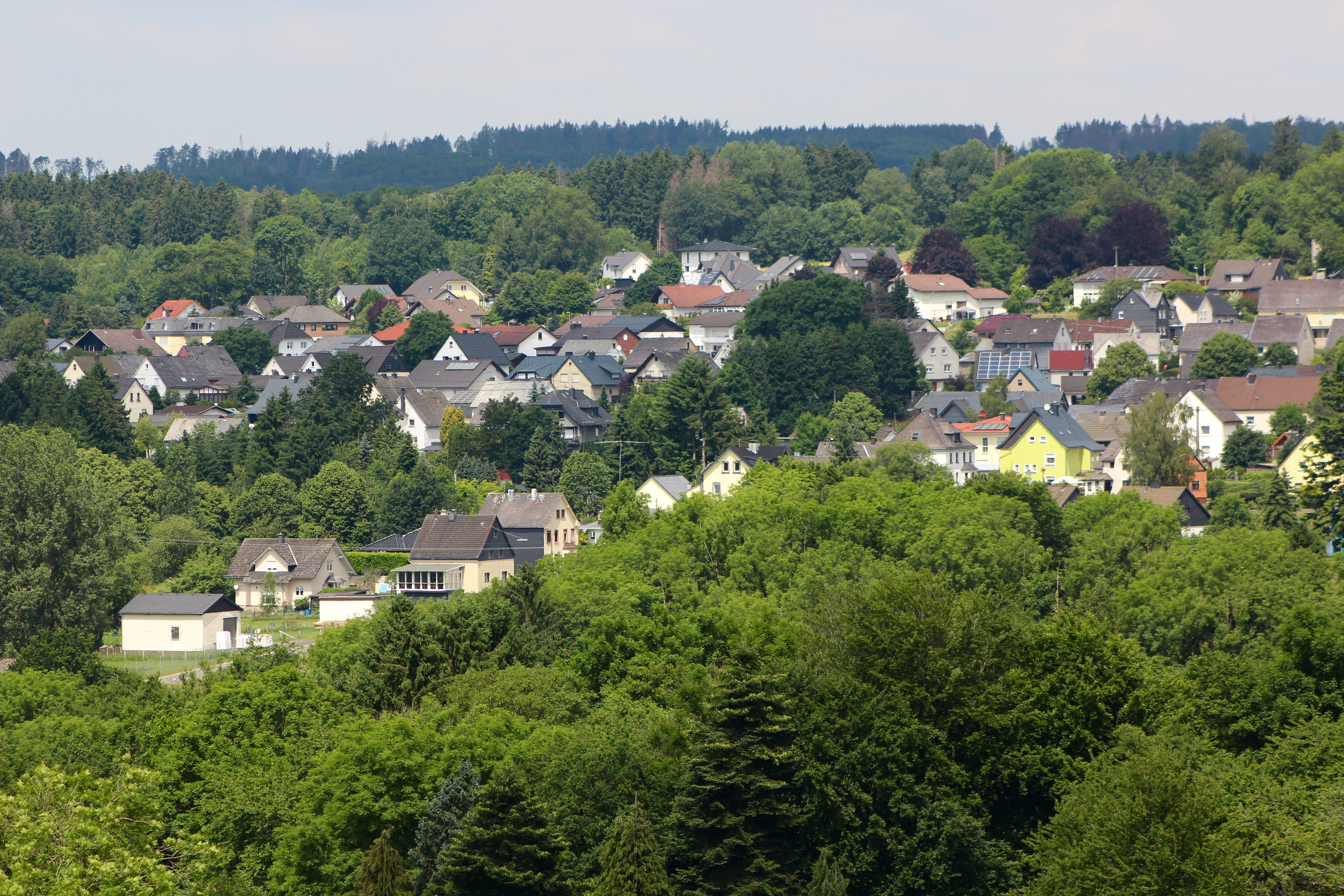

- Coat of arms

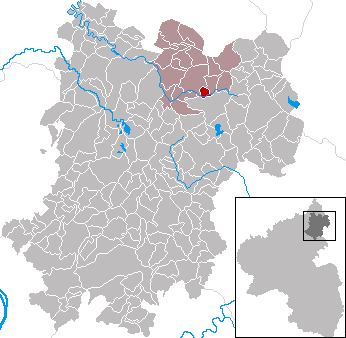
- Location of Großseifen within Westerwaldkreis district
- Interactive map of Großseifen
- Location within Germany Location within Rhineland-Palatinate
- Coordinates: 50°38′06″N 7°58′05″E
- Country: Germany
- State: Rhineland-Palatinate
- District: Westerwaldkreis
- Municipal assoc.: Bad Marienberg (Westerwald)

Government
  - Mayor (2019–24): Jürgen Steup

Area
  - Total: 1.52 km^{2} (0.59 sq mi)
- Elevation: 454 m (1,490 ft)

Population (2025-12-31)
  - Total: 616
  - Density: 405/km^{2} (1,050/sq mi)
- Time zone: UTC+01:00 (CET)
  - Summer (DST): UTC+02:00 (CEST)
- Postal codes: 56472
- Dialling codes: 02661
- Vehicle registration: WW, WEB, MT

Großseifen (or Grossseifen) is an Ortsgemeinde – a community belonging to a Verbandsgemeinde – in the Westerwaldkreis in Rhineland-Palatinate, Germany.

== Geography ==
The community lies in the Westerwald between Limburg and Siegen. The river Nister, which is in the Sieg drainage basin, flows east to west through the community. Großseifen belongs to the Verbandsgemeinde of Bad Marienberg, a kind of collective municipality. Its seat is in the like-named town.

== History ==
This community near Bad Marienberg had its first documentary mention on 6 January 1307 when Count Heinrich of Nassau with his wife Adelheid confirmed to the abbot and convent of the Marienstatt Cistercian Monastery the existing revenue in Velde (=Fehl/Fehl-Ritzhausen) and Graynsiven. The community of Großseifen celebrated 700 years of existence on 19 and 20 August 2006. The community's name has undergone many changes over the centuries, at various times being written Gransifen, Grassyffen, Grassifen, Graensüffen, Graseiffen and then eventually Großseifen, as the community is now known.

The name's ending of –siven, –sifen or –seifen describes a kind of wetland found in the area. The first syllable Grayn– or Gran– might perhaps mean Krähn (“crows”). Etymologically, the many spellings cannot be explained. Even misspellings and mishearings over time are suspected.

== Politics ==
=== Community council ===
The council is made up of 12 council members who were elected in a majority vote in a municipal election on 7 June 2009.

=== Mayors ===
The following persons have held the office of Ortsbürgermeister of Großseifen since 1946:

- 1946–1954: Wilhelm Hoffmann
- 1954–1969: Walter Utsch
- 1969–1979: Hermann Wollenweber
- 1979–1992: Jürgen Steup
- 1992–1994: Günter Thiede
- 1994–1996: Günther Uhr
- 1996–1999: Günter Thiede
- 1999–2009: Thomas Stalp
- since 2009: Jürgen Steup
