= Hardt, Westerwaldkreis =

Hardt
- Municipality
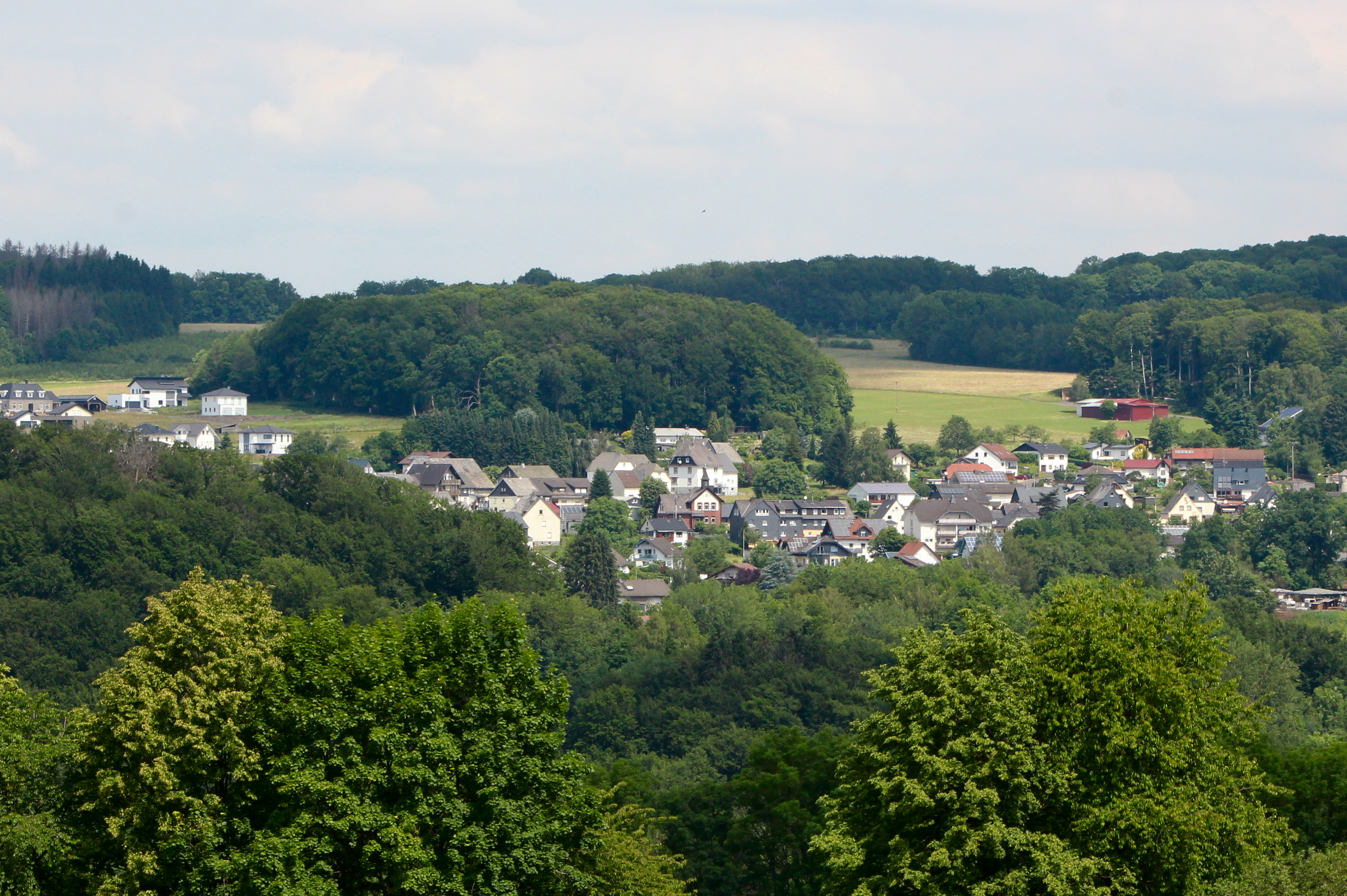

- Coat of arms

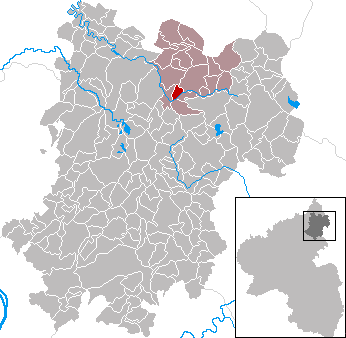
- Location of Hardt within Westerwaldkreis district
- Interactive map of Hardt
- Location within Germany Location within Rhineland-Palatinate
- Coordinates: 50°38′07″N 7°55′12″E
- Country: Germany
- State: Rhineland-Palatinate
- District: Westerwaldkreis
- Municipal assoc.: Bad Marienberg (Westerwald)

Government
  - Mayor (2019–24): Gabriele Greis

Area
  - Total: 1.88 km^{2} (0.73 sq mi)
- Elevation: 410 m (1,350 ft)

Population (2025-12-31)
  - Total: 466
  - Density: 248/km^{2} (642/sq mi)
- Time zone: UTC+01:00 (CET)
  - Summer (DST): UTC+02:00 (CEST)
- Postal codes: 56472
- Dialling codes: 02661
- Vehicle registration: WW
- Website: www.bad-marienberg.de

Hardt (German pronunciation: [haʁt]) is an Ortsgemeinde – a community belonging to a Verbandsgemeinde – in the Westerwaldkreis in Rhineland-Palatinate, Germany.

== Geography ==
The community lies in the Westerwald between Limburg and Siegen. The river Nister, which is part of the Sieg drainage basin, flows east to west through the municipal area. Hardt belongs to the Verbandsgemeinde of Bad Marienberg, a kind of collective municipality. Its seat is in the like-named town.

== Politics ==
The municipal council is made up of 8 council members who were elected in a majority vote in a municipal election on 7 June 2009.

== Economy and infrastructure ==
=== Transport ===
The nearest Autobahn interchanges are Montabaur on the A 3 (Cologne–Frankfurt), some 27 km away, and Haiger/Burbach on the A 45 (Dortmund–Hanau), some 25 km away. Hardt used to have a stop at the Erbach - Fehl-Ritzhausen Railway which isnoutbof service nowadays, the nearest train stop today is Nistertal-Bad Marienberg station of the Limburg-Altenkirchen Railway. Nowadays the bus line 449 connects Nistertal/ Bad Marienberg station with Bad Marienberg via Hardt. The nearest InterCityExpress stop is the railway station at Montabaur on the Cologne-Frankfurt high-speed rail line.
