= Stockhausen-Illfurth =

- Municipality
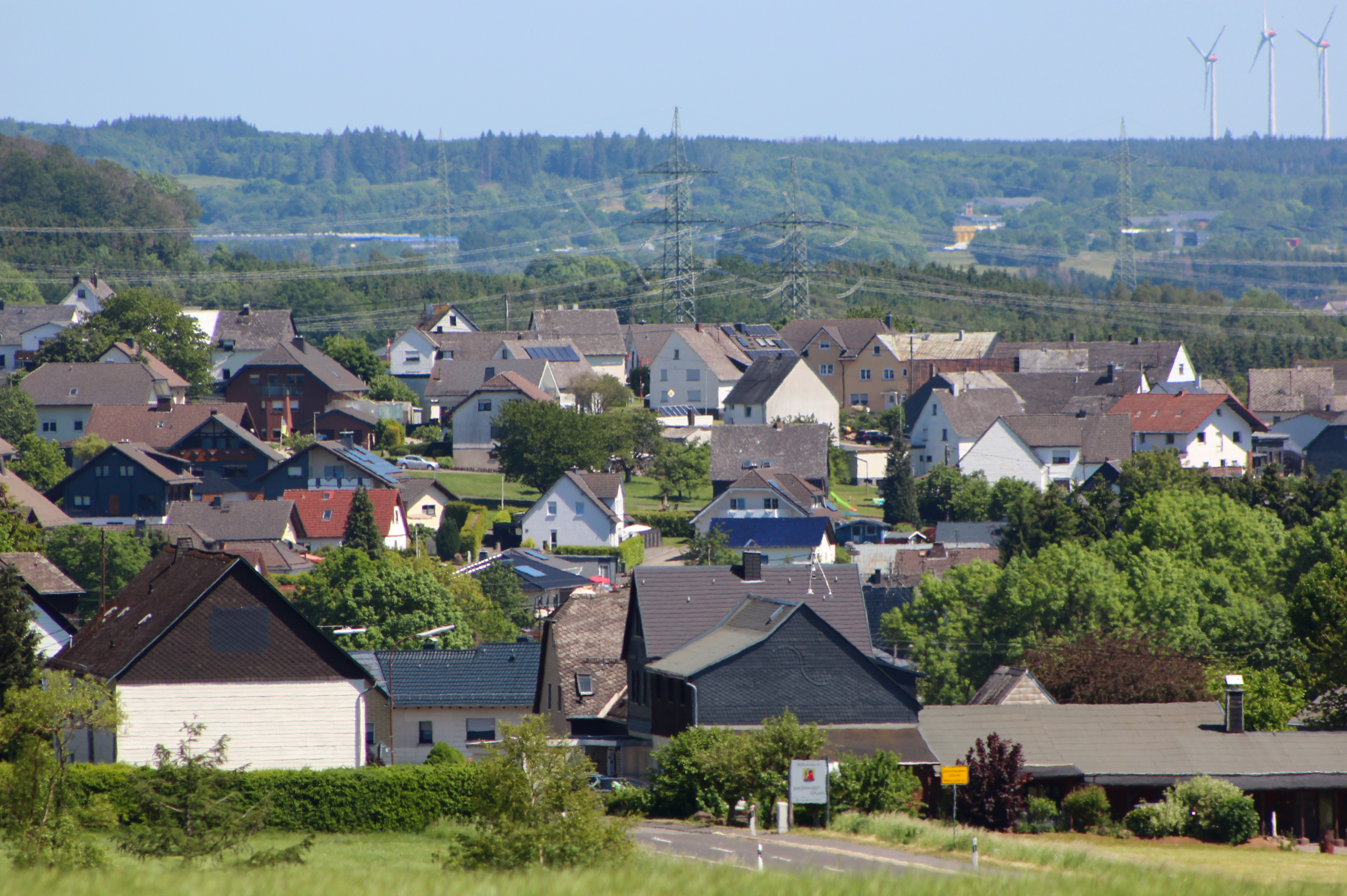

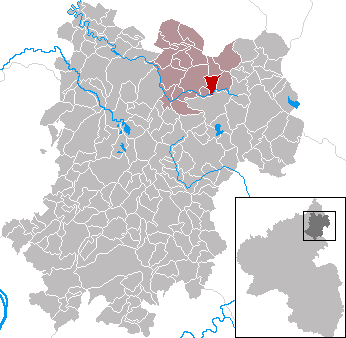
- Location of Stockhausen-Illfurth within Westerwaldkreis district
- Interactive map of Stockhausen-Illfurth
- Location within Germany Location within Rhineland-Palatinate
- Coordinates: 50°38′48″N 7°59′15″E
- Country: Germany
- State: Rhineland-Palatinate
- District: Westerwaldkreis
- Municipal assoc.: Bad Marienberg (Westerwald)

Government
  - Mayor (2019–24): Günter Weinbrenner

Area
  - Total: 3.24 km^{2} (1.25 sq mi)
- Elevation: 496 m (1,627 ft)

Population (2025-12-31)
  - Total: 422
  - Density: 130/km^{2} (337/sq mi)
- Time zone: UTC+01:00 (CET)
  - Summer (DST): UTC+02:00 (CEST)
- Postal codes: 56472
- Dialling codes: 02661
- Vehicle registration: WW
- Website: www.bad-marienberg.de

Stockhausen-Illfurth is an Ortsgemeinde – a community belonging to a Verbandsgemeinde – in the Westerwaldkreis in Rhineland-Palatinate, Germany.

== Geography ==
The community lies in the Westerwald between Limburg and Siegen. The Große Nister river flows through the community. Stockhausen-Illfurth belongs to the Verbandsgemeinde of Bad Marienberg, a kind of collective municipality. Its seat is in the like-named town.

== History ==
In 1438, Stockhausen-Illfurth had its first documented mention.

== Politics ==
The municipal council is made up of 8 council members who were elected in a majority vote in a municipal election on 13 June 2004.

== Economy and infrastructure ==
North of the community runs Bundesstraße 414, leading from Hohenroth to Hachenburg. The nearest Autobahn interchange is Haiger/Burbach on the A 45 (Dortmund–Hanau), some 22 km away. The nearest IntercityExpress stop is the railway station at Montabaur on the Cologne–Frankfurt high-speed rail line.
