= Driedorf =

- Municipality
- Coat of arms

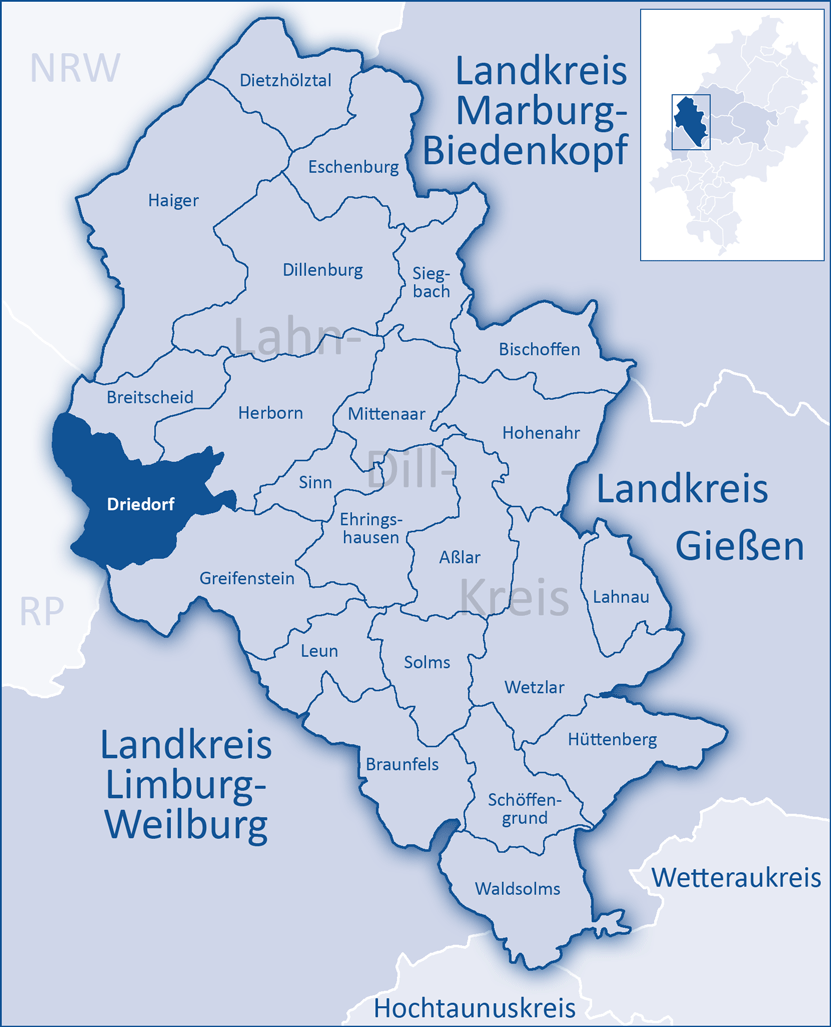
- Location of Driedorf within Lahn-Dill-Kreis district
- Interactive map of Driedorf
- Location within Germany Location within Hesse
- Coordinates: 50°38′N 08°11′E
- Country: Germany
- State: Hesse
- Admin. region: Gießen
- District: Lahn-Dill-Kreis

Government
  - Mayor (2022–28): Carsten Braun (CDU)

Area
  - Total: 47.56 km^{2} (18.36 sq mi)
- Elevation: 486 m (1,594 ft)

Population (2025-12-31)
  - Total: 5,024
  - Density: 105.6/km^{2} (273.6/sq mi)
- Time zone: UTC+01:00 (CET)
  - Summer (DST): UTC+02:00 (CEST)
- Postal codes: 35759
- Dialling codes: 02775
- Vehicle registration: LDK
- Website: www.driedorf.de

Driedorf (German pronunciation: [ˈdʁiːdɔʁf]) is a municipality in the Lahn-Dill-Kreis in Hesse, Germany.

== Geography ==
=== Location ===
Driedorf lies from 416 to 642 m above sea level on a tableland in the high Westerwald.

==== Mademühlen ====
Mademühlen has about 1,000 inhabitants and lies in the "Hessischer Westerwald" protected area and in the European protected area network Natura 2000. It is on the upper reaches of the Rehbach, between two reservoirs.

==== Münchhausen ====
Münchhausen is the first village on the Ulmbach and is blessed with extensive woodlands, which afforded prosperity in earlier times.

=== Neighbouring communities ===
Driedorf borders in the north on the community of Breitscheid, in the east on the town of Herborn, in the south on the community of Greifenstein (all in the Lahn-Dill-Kreis), and in the west on the communities of Oberrod, Rehe, Homberg, Waigandshain, Nister-Möhrendorf and Willingen (all in the Westerwaldkreis in Rhineland-Palatinate).

=== Constituent communities ===
Besides the namesake centre, there are eight other centres in Driedorf named Mademühlen, Roth, Waldaubach, Münchhausen, Hohenroth, Heisterberg, Heiligenborn and Seilhofen.

== History ==
Driedorf had its first documentary mention in 1124.

The greater community of Driedorf came into being in three stages as part of Hesse's municipal reforms in the 1970s. On 1 October 1971, the communities of Driedorf, Heisterberg, Hohenroth, and Heiligenborn united, and three months later, on 1 January 1972, Münchhausen followed. Five years to the day later, on 1 January 1977, Seilhofen, Waldaubach, Mademühlen and Roth were amalgamated with Driedorf by state law.

=== Mademühlen ===
This village's namesake was a row of mills (Mühlen = "mills" in German) that for centuries stood along the upper reaches of the Rehbach. About 1800, it had a special mention in a description as being a rich farming village. The local poet Adolf Weiß (1861–1938) was from Mademühlen, and a memorial to him may still be visited today.

=== Münchhausen ===
The name Münchhausen makes it clear that it was founded by monks (Mönche = "monk" in German). Up until the beginning of the last century, in the church's eyes at least, it consisted of two places separated from each other by the Ulmbach. In 1989, Münchhausen celebrated 750 years of existence.

== Politics ==
=== Mayors ===
- 1977–1995: Friedhelm Kessler, who had been mayor of Driedorf before amalgamation
- 1996–2007: Wolfgang Schuster (SPD)
- 2007–2010: Wolfgang Kühn (SPD)
- 2010–2016: Dirk Hardt (SPD)
- 2016–incumbent: Carsten Braun (CDU)

=== Municipal council ===
The municipal elections on 14 March 2021 yielded the following results:

CDU	15 seats
SPD	8 seats
FWG	6 Seats
FBL	2 Seats

Note: FWG is a citizens' coalition and FBL is a "Free Citizens List"

== Economy and infrastructure ==
=== Electricity ===
For a few years, the Westerwald's wind has been being used to generate electricity. Driedorf has 17 windfarms, 6 in Mademühlen, and the others distributed among the other centres which all together generate 13 GWh, amounting to 40% of the community's needs. Wind energy has reduced the yearly CO_{2} output by about 7 000 t. The community, however, does not wish for any further windfarms.

=== Transport ===
Driedorf had a stop at the Cross Westerwald Railway (Montabaur - Wallmerod - Westerburg - Rennerod - Herborn), which is out of service for passenger trains and deconstructed between Rennerod and Herborn. Nowadays it is only in service for fright trains from Montabaur to Wallmerod and from Fehl-Ritzhausen to Rennerod station touristic railbike tours take place, organized by the interest group IG Westerwald-Querbahn e. V. (IWQ). today the nearest accessibilities to train service are Westerburg and Herborn station.

The local bus line 480 serves Driedorf on the route from Westerburg station via Pottum, Stahlhofen and Rennerod to Krombachtalsperre.

== Sightseeing ==
There are two lakes in Driedorf, the Stausee Driedorf, a man-made lake for flood control and hydroelectric generation between Driedorf (main town) and Mademühlen, and the Heisterberger Weiher just outside Heisterberg to the southeast. Also nearby is the Krombach Reservoir, also used for flood control and hydroelectric generation, which straddles the Hesse-Rhineland-Palatinate border.

Noteworthy is the Evangelical Church on the Rehbach in Mademühlen. Built in the 11th century, it is Driedorf's oldest building.
