= List of lakes of Rhineland-Palatinate =

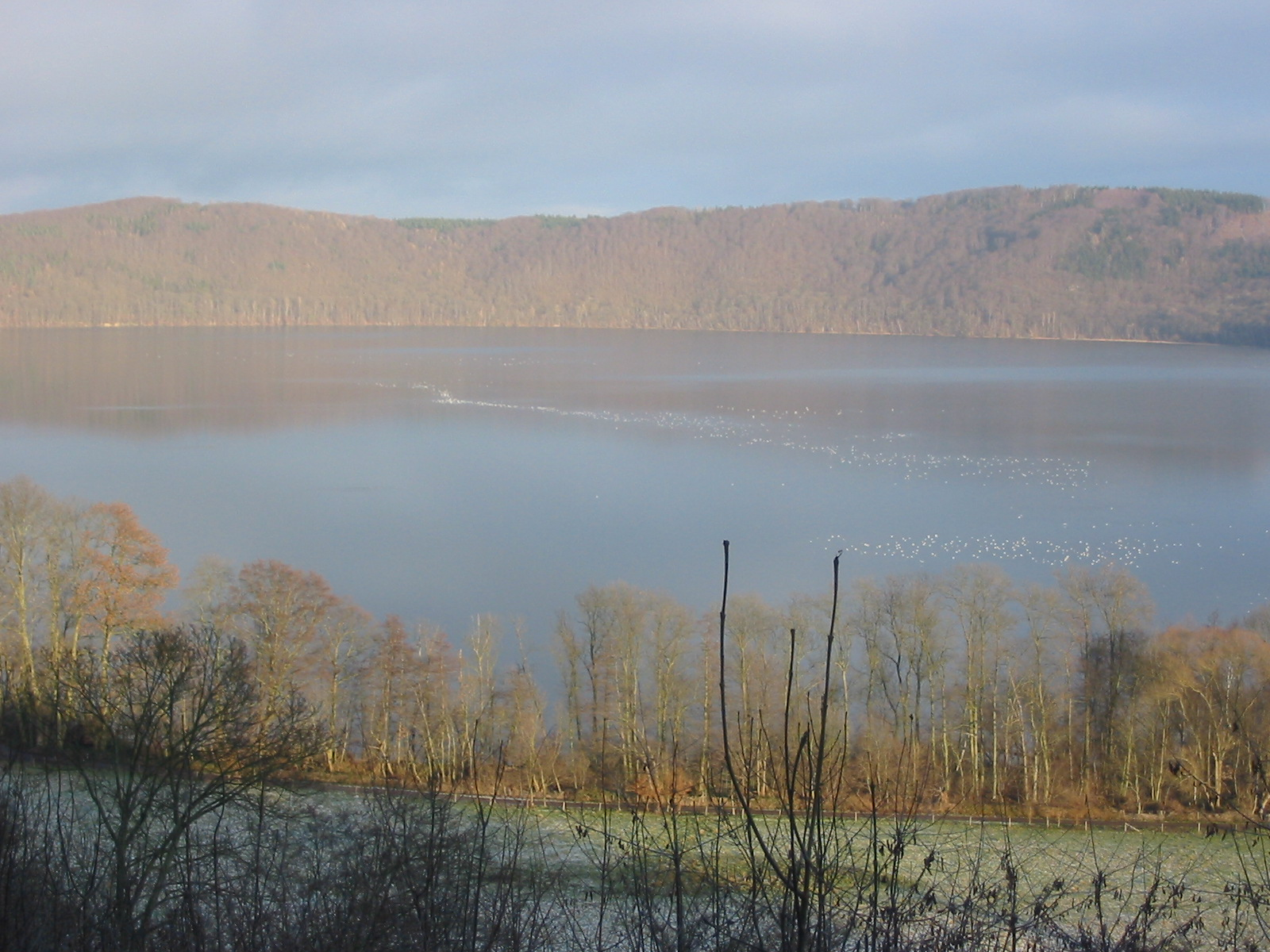
The Laacher Lake in winter

This list of the lakes of Rhineland-Palatinate in Germany is divided into the individual regions of the state of Rhineland-Palatinate, which are organised from west to east and north to south.

The rivers and streams of Rhineland-Palatinate may be found in their own list.

== Eifel ==
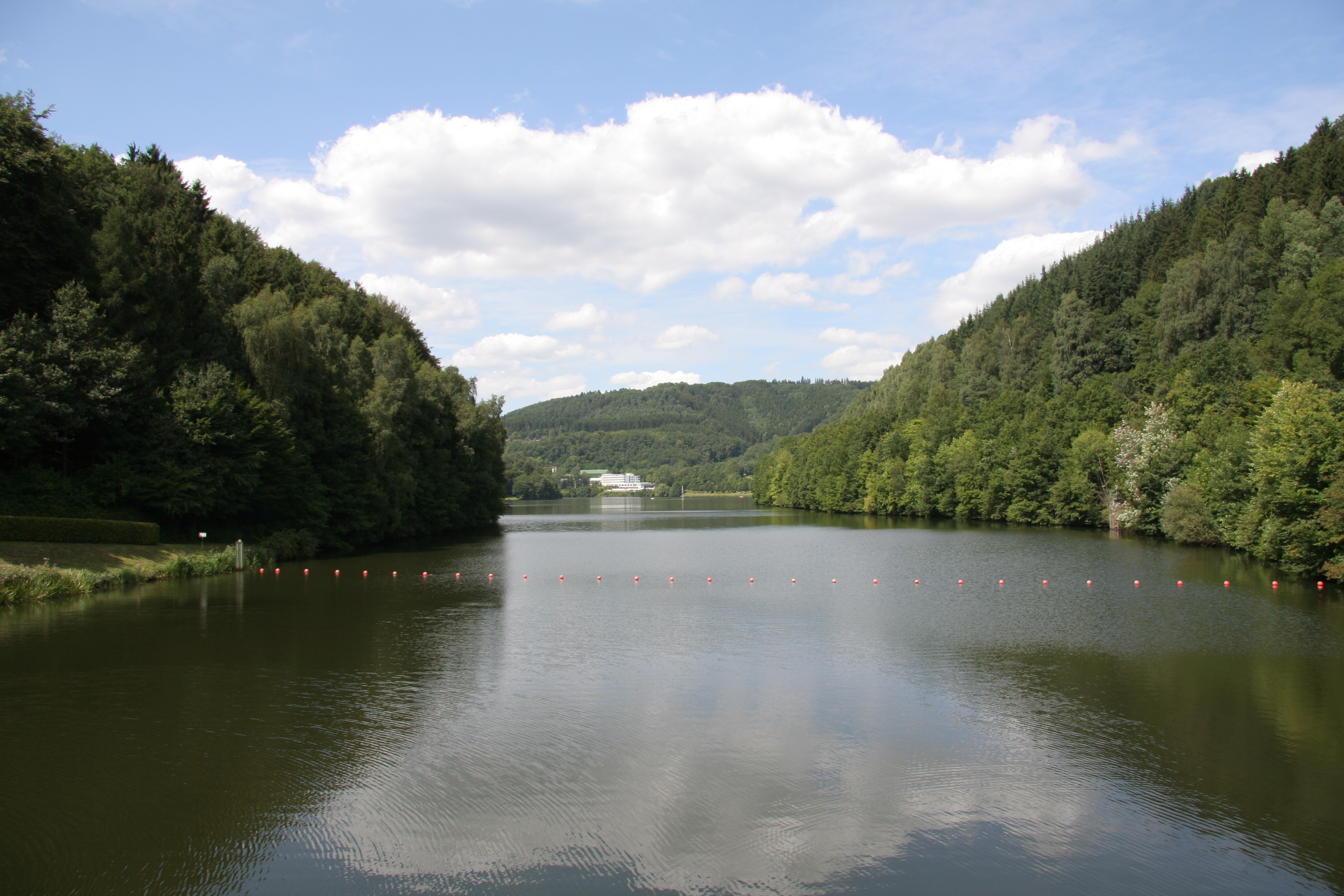
Bitburger Reservoir

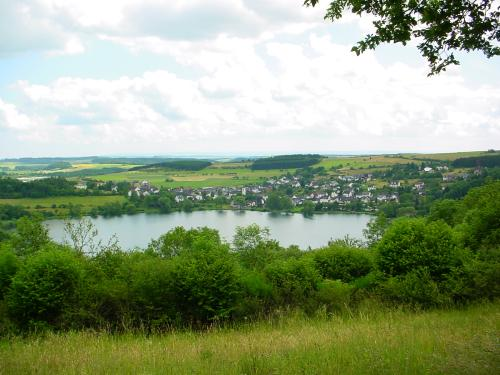
Schalkenmehrener Maar

In the Eifel mountains, the lakes are mostly maars, crater lakes and reservoirs. The maars and crater lakes were formed more than ten thousand years ago by small, local eruptions of volcanic gases.

- Bitburg Reservoir (reservoir on the Prüm)
- Dreiser Weiher (maar)
- Dürres Maar (maar)
- Eichholzmaar (maar)
- Gemündener Maar (maar)
- Holzmaar (maar)
- Kronenburger See (reservoir on the Kyll)
- Laacher See (crater lake)
- Meerfelder Maar (maar)
- Pulvermaar (maar)
- Schalkenmehrener Maar (maar)
- Ulmener Maar (maar)
- Waldsee near Rieden (reservoir on the Rehbach)
- Weinfelder Maar or Totenmaar (maar)
- Windsborn Crater Lake

== Westerwald ==
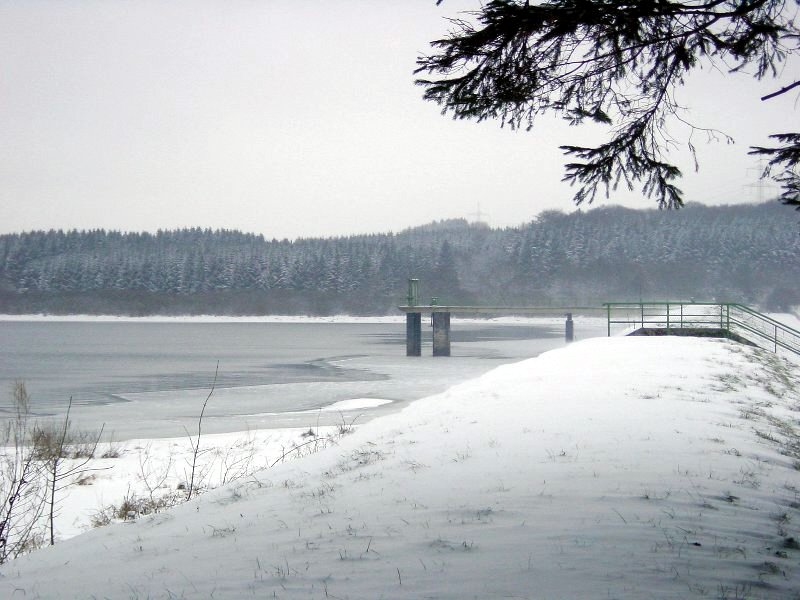
Reservoir and barrier of the Krombach Dam

In marsh regions of the Westerwald large fish ponds were laid out for centuries which today resemble natural lakes. There are also several reservoirs along the course of the larger rivers.

- Blauer See (former basalt quarry)
- Brinkenweiher (Westerwälder Seenplatte)
- Dreifelder Weiher or Seeweiher (Westerwald Lake District)
- Elkenrother Weiher (reservoir on the Elbbach)
- Haidenweiher (Westerwald Lake District)
- Hausweiher (Westerwald Lake District)
- Herthasee (Nassau Nature Park)
- Hoffmannsweiher (Westerwald Lake District)
- Krombach Reservoir (reservoir on the Rehbach)
- Postweiher (Westerwald Lake District)
- Seeweiher (reservoir)
- Waldsee (natural lake)
- Wiesensee (reservoir on the Seebach and the Hüttenbach)
- Wölferlinger Weiher (Westerwald Lake District)

== Hunsrück ==
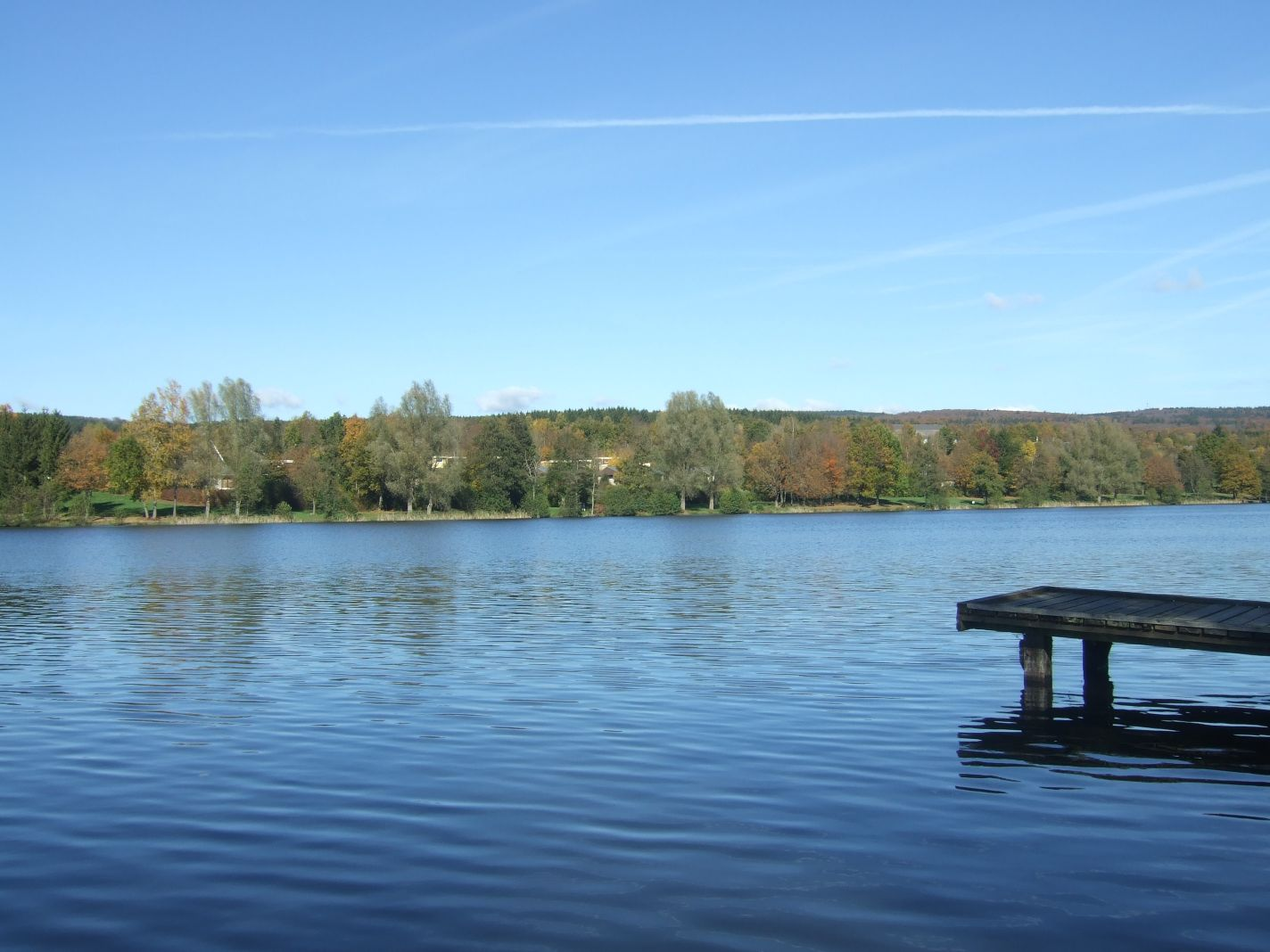
Keller Reservoir

In the narrow valleys of the Hunsrück reservoirs were created by building dams in order to ensure the water supply, even outside of the mountains e.g. for the city of Trier.

- Dhron Reservoir (reservoir on the Kleine Dhron)
- Keller Reservoir (reservoir on the Ruwer)
- Reservoir Niederhausen (reservoir on the Nahe)
- Riveris Reservoir (reservoir on the Riveris)
- Steinbach Reservoir (reservoir on the Steinbach)

== Landstuhl Marsh ==
The boggy depression of the Landstuhl Marsh (Landstuhler Bruch), long since drained, was given a reservoir in order to increase the leisure value of the region. A second lake was added from an old gravel pit.

- Ohmbachsee (reservoir on the Ohmbach)
- Silbersee (gravel pit between Kindsbach and Landstuhl, created around 1960 to extract sand for the construction of the motorway)

== Palatinate Forest ==
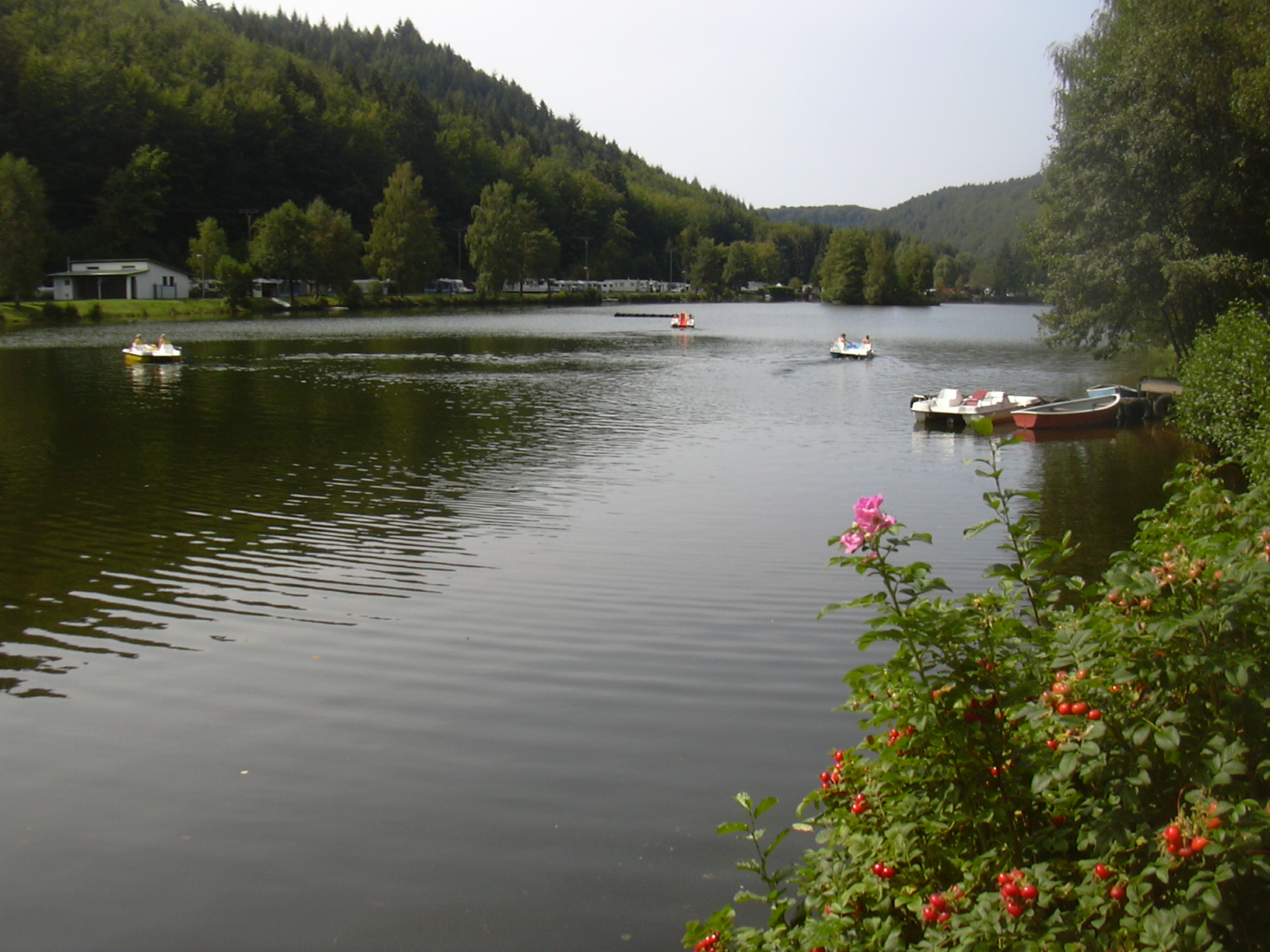
Clausensee, a woog on the Schwarzbach

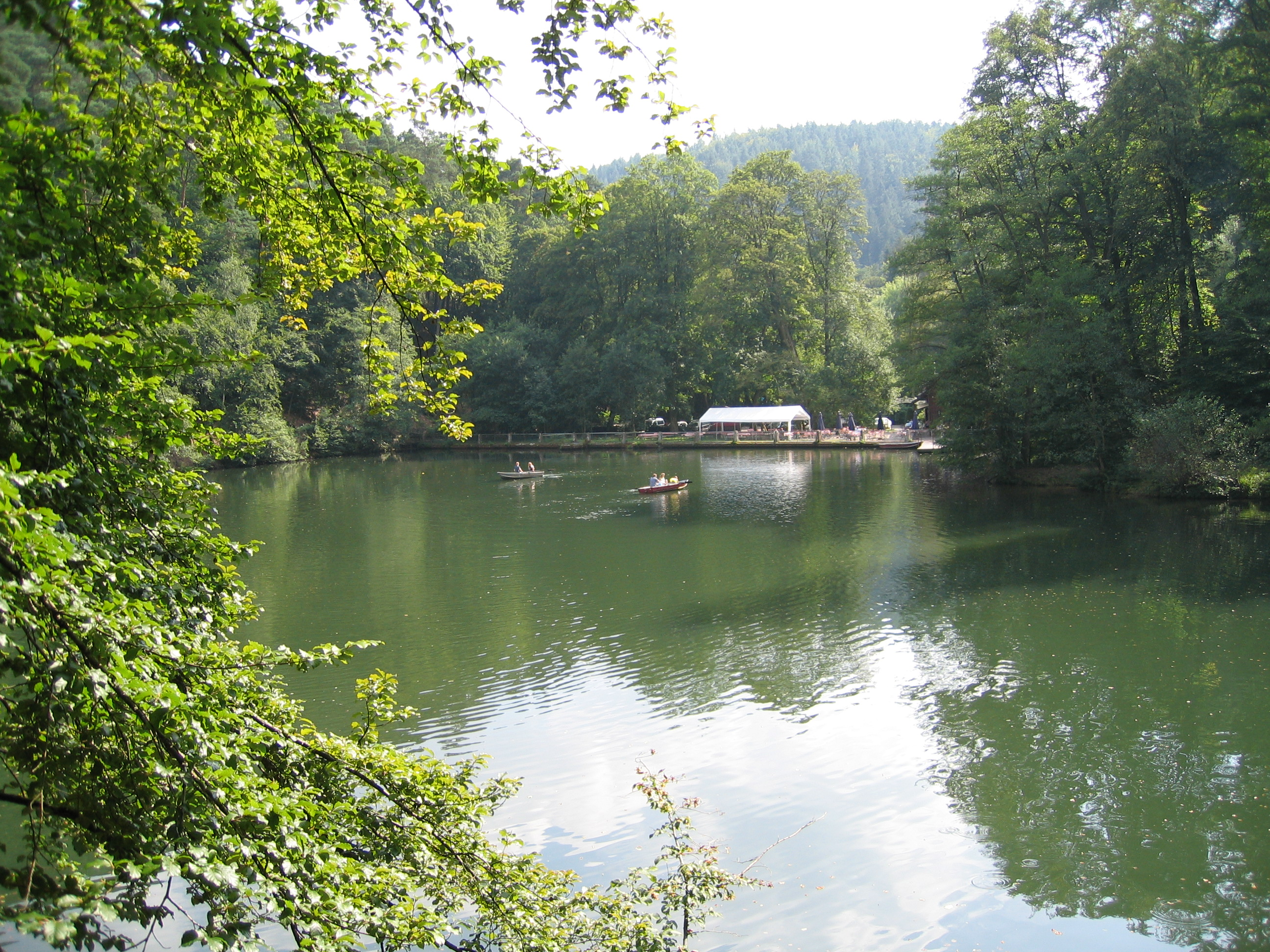
Isenachweiher, a woog on the Isenach

In the Palatinate Forest there are only a few natural lakes, none of which are larger than ponds in size. Since the Middle Ages, however, numerous reservoirs have been created, usually known as ‘’woogs’’. They acted as water storage for mills, as fish ponds and as so-called ‘’ klause’’s, ponds which were used to gather logs during the 19th and 20th centuries ready for rafting down the river.

- Biedenbacher Woog (reservoir on the Leinbach)
- Clausensee (reservoir on the Schwarzbach near Clausen)
- Dämmelswoog (reservoir near Fischbach)
- Eckbachweiher (reservoir on the Eckbach near Neuleiningen-Tal)
- Eiswoog (reservoir on the Eisbach near Ramsen)
- Finsterthaler Woog (reservoir on the Leinbach)
- Gambswoog or Gambsklause (reservoir on the Lauter headstream, the Wartenbach east of Merzalben)
- Gelterswoog (reservoir on the Hoheneckermühlbach)
- Hammerwoog, also called Blechhammerweiher (reservoir on the Wurzelwooggraben in Kaiserslautern)
- Helmbachweiher (reservoir on the Kohlbach just before its confluence with the Helmbach)
- Isenachweiher (reservoir on the Isenach)
- Jagdhausweiher (reservoir on the Aschbach south of Kaiserslautern-Dansenberg)
- Katzenwoog (reservoir on the Erlenbach near Kaiserslautern)
- Klößweiher (reservoir on the Rösselsbach in Ludwigswinkel)
- Königsweiher (reservoir on the Saarbach in Schönau)
- Kolbenwoog (reservoir of a left tributary of the Hoheneckermühlbach)
- Mühlweiher (reservoir on the Saarbach at Saarbacherhammer in Fischbach)
- Mühlwoog (reservoir on the Leinbach just before its confluence with the Hochspeyerbach)
- Pfälzerwoog or Palatinatewoog (reservoir on the Pfälzerwoogbach near Fischbach)
- Schöntalweiher (reservoir on the Saarbach in Ludwigswinkel)
- Schweinswoog (reservoir on the Eußerbach near Eußerthal)
- Seewoog (reservoir on the Leinbach near Waldleiningen)
- Silzer See (reservoir on the Klingbach near Silz)
- Spießwoog (reservoir on the Spießbach near Fischbach)
- Stüdenwoog (reservoir on the Stüdenbach near Eppenbrunn)
- Ungeheuersee (raised bog lake of the Krumbach near Weisenheim am Berg)
- Vogelwoog (reservoir on the Wurzelwooggraben in Kaiserslautern)
- Walzweiher (reservoir on the Aschbach neben of the Bundesstraße 270)

== Rhine Plain ==
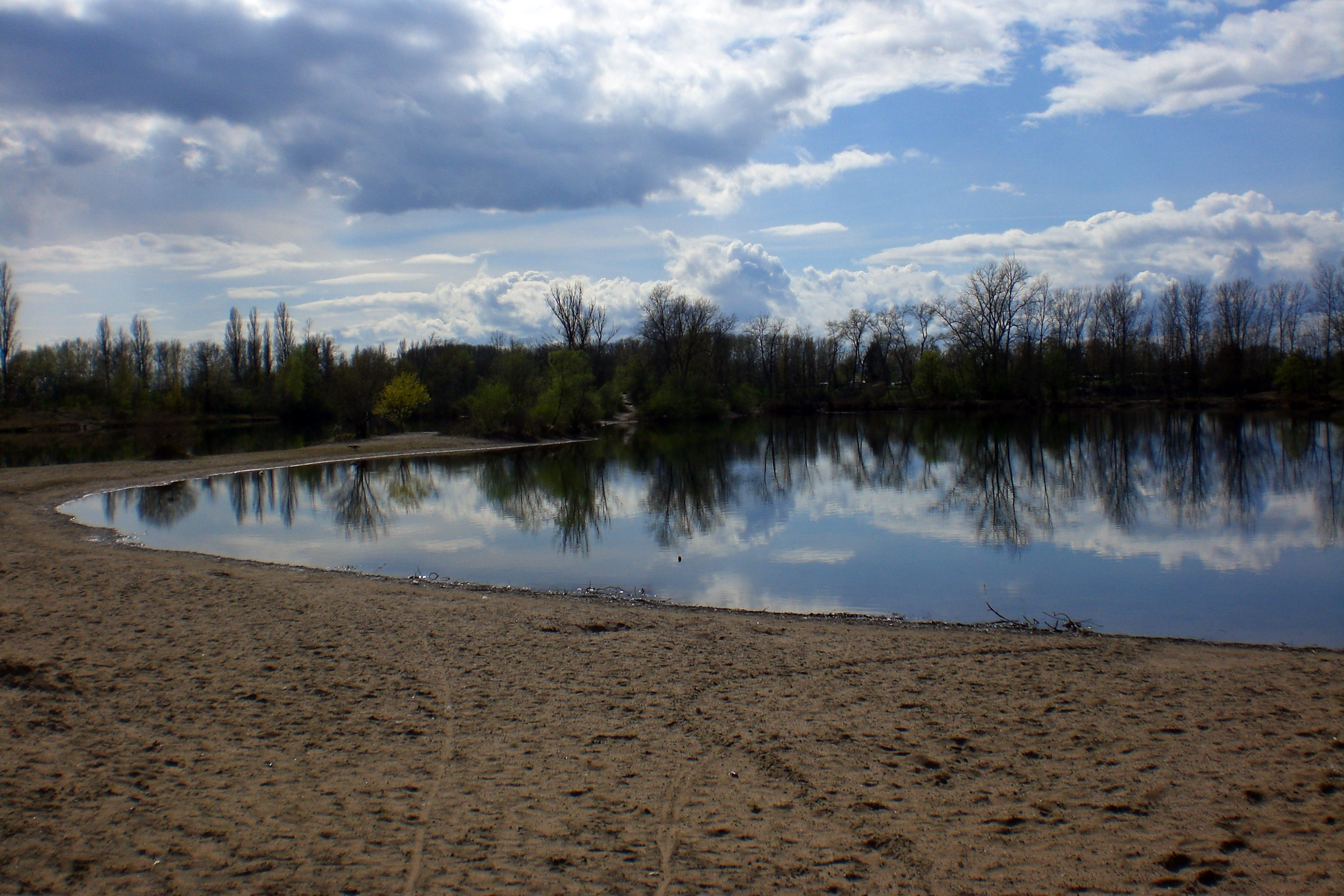
The Blaue Adria near Altrip

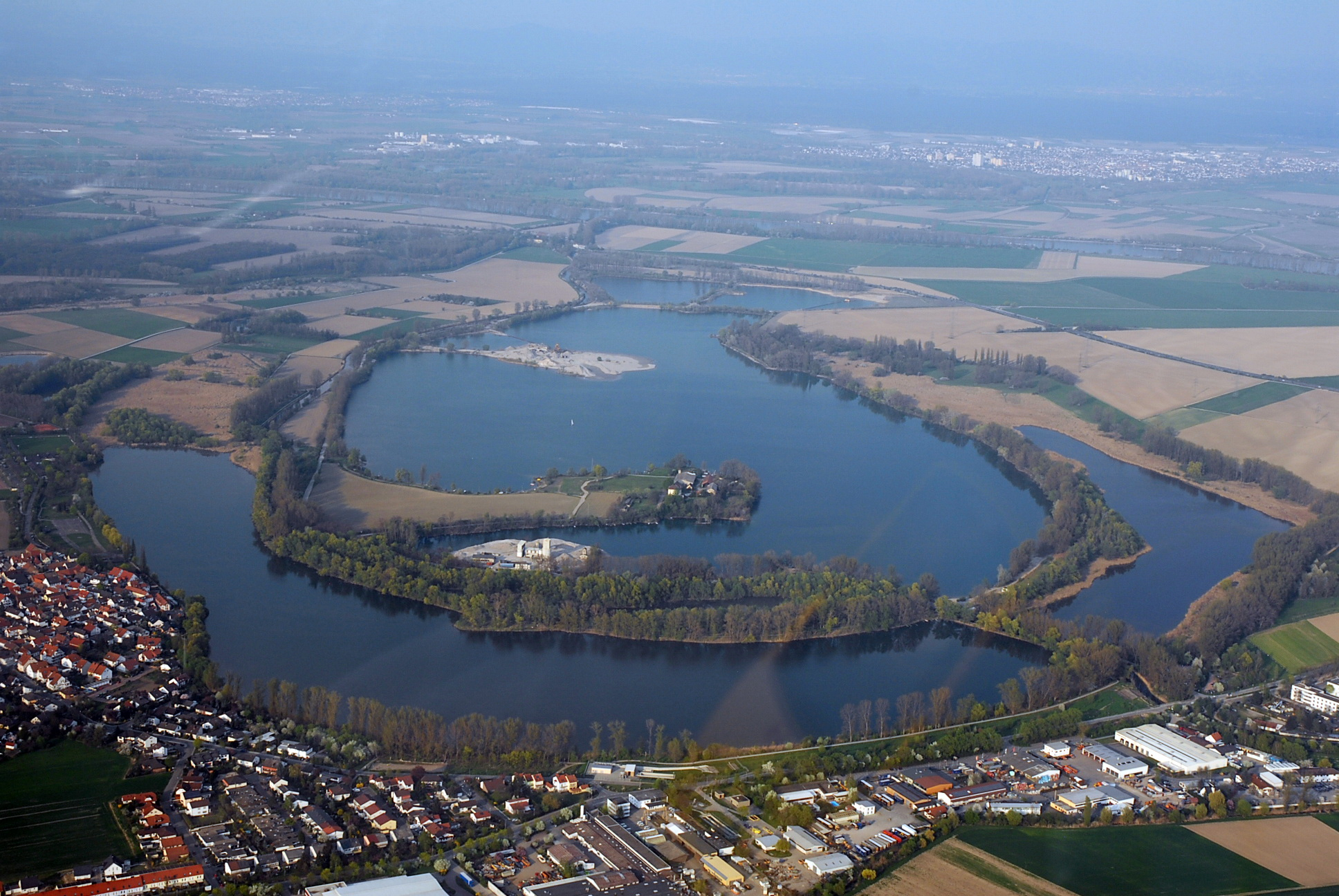
The Silbersee at Roxheim (behind the Old Rhine)

In the northwestern part of the Upper Rhine Plain, which belongs to Rhineland-Palatinate, there are no natural lakes. However, as a result of the extraction of sand and gravel in the old branches of the Rhine, flooded gravel pits were formed. In addition, small streams were impounded to create bathing lakes, supplementing the normal swimming pools.

- Almensee (gravel pit near Bad Dürkheim)
- Blaue Adria (Old Rhine gravel pit near Altrip)
- Eicher See (gravel pit near Eich with an intact link to the Rhine)
- Jägerweiher (Old Rhine gravel pit near Altrip)
- Kiefweiher (Old Rhine gravel pit near Altrip)
- Kistnerweiher (Old Rhine gravel pit near Altrip)
- Kühweiher (formed by widening the Schwabenbach near Gönnheim)
- Lambsheimer Weiher (gravel pit near Lambsheim)
- Neuhofener Altrhein (Old Rhine gravel pit near Neuhofen)
- Niederwiesenweiher (gravel pit near Böhl-Iggelheim)
- Pfarrwiesensee (gravel pit near Gimbsheim)
- Silbersee Altrip (Old Rhine gravel pit near Altrip)
- Silbersee Roxheim (Old Rhine gravel pit near Bobenheim-Roxheim)
- Schlicht (gravel pit near Neuhofen)
- Schwanenweiher (Old Rhine gravel pit near Altrip)
- Wolfgangsee (gravel pit near Neuhofen)
