= Gräbersberg =

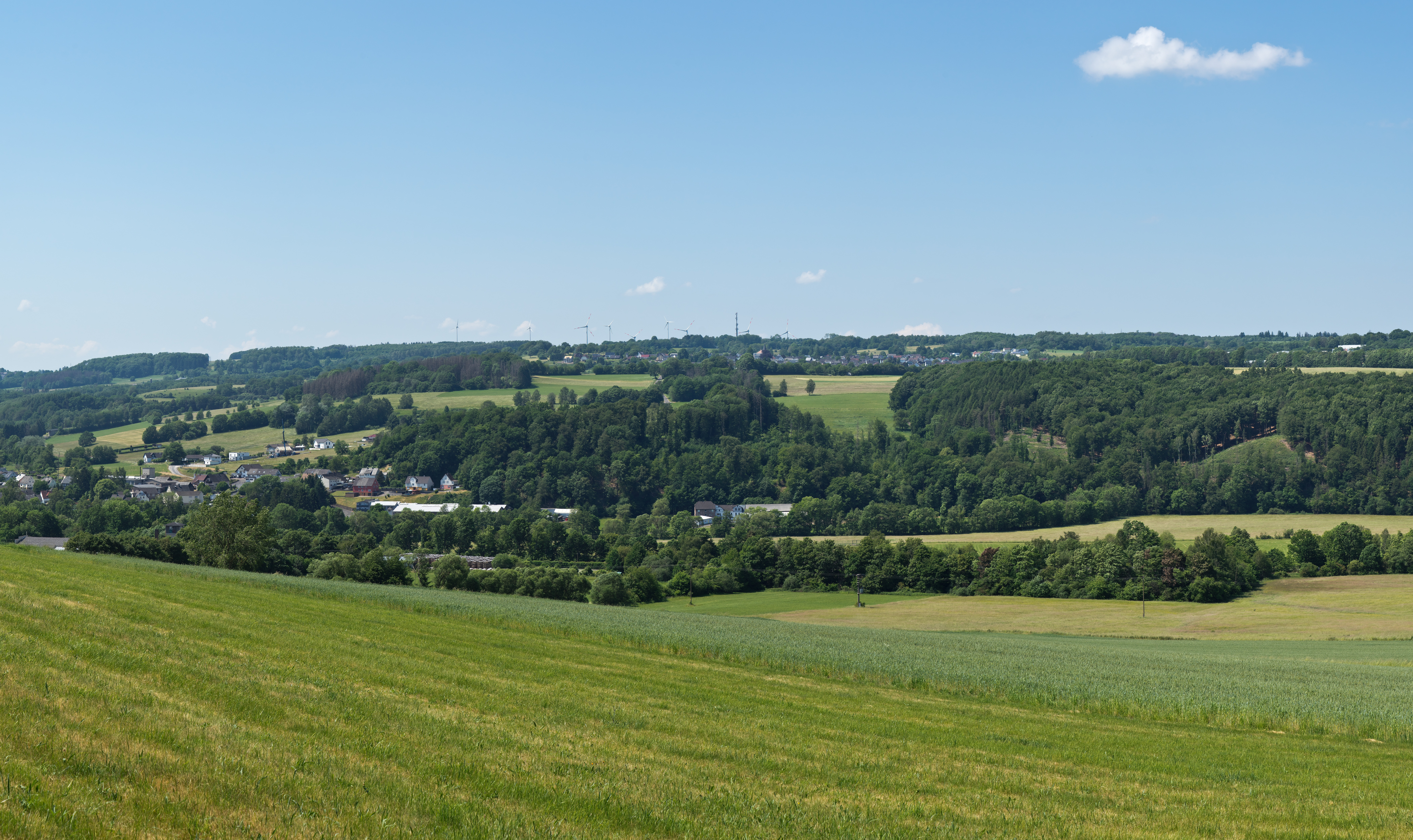
- The Gräbersberg from the northeast

Highest point
- Elevation: 513.1 m above sea level (NHN) (1,683 ft)
- Listing: Mobile radio and viewing tower
- Coordinates: 50°37′31.6″N 7°51′3.2″E

Geography
- Location within Rhineland-Palatinate
- Location: Near Alpenrod, Westerwaldkreis, Rhineland-Palatinate
- Parent range: Westerwald

The Gräbersberg, at 513.1 m above sea level (NHN), the highest point in the western Westerwald, a low mountain range in central Germany whose western region extends from the Nister river in the east to the Rhine in the west. On the slopes of the Gräbersberg lies the village of Alpenrod, part of the collective municipality of Hachenburg. South of the hill is the protected area of the Westerwald Lake District and village of Lochum.

== Viewing tower ==
In 1998, a 73-metre-high viewing tower, the Gräbersberg Tower, was erected at the summit by mobile telephone operator, E-Plus. At 33 metres above the ground there is a viewing platform which is 8.5 metres in diameter.

== Panorama ==
All-round view from the viewing platform
