= Alpenrod =

- Municipality
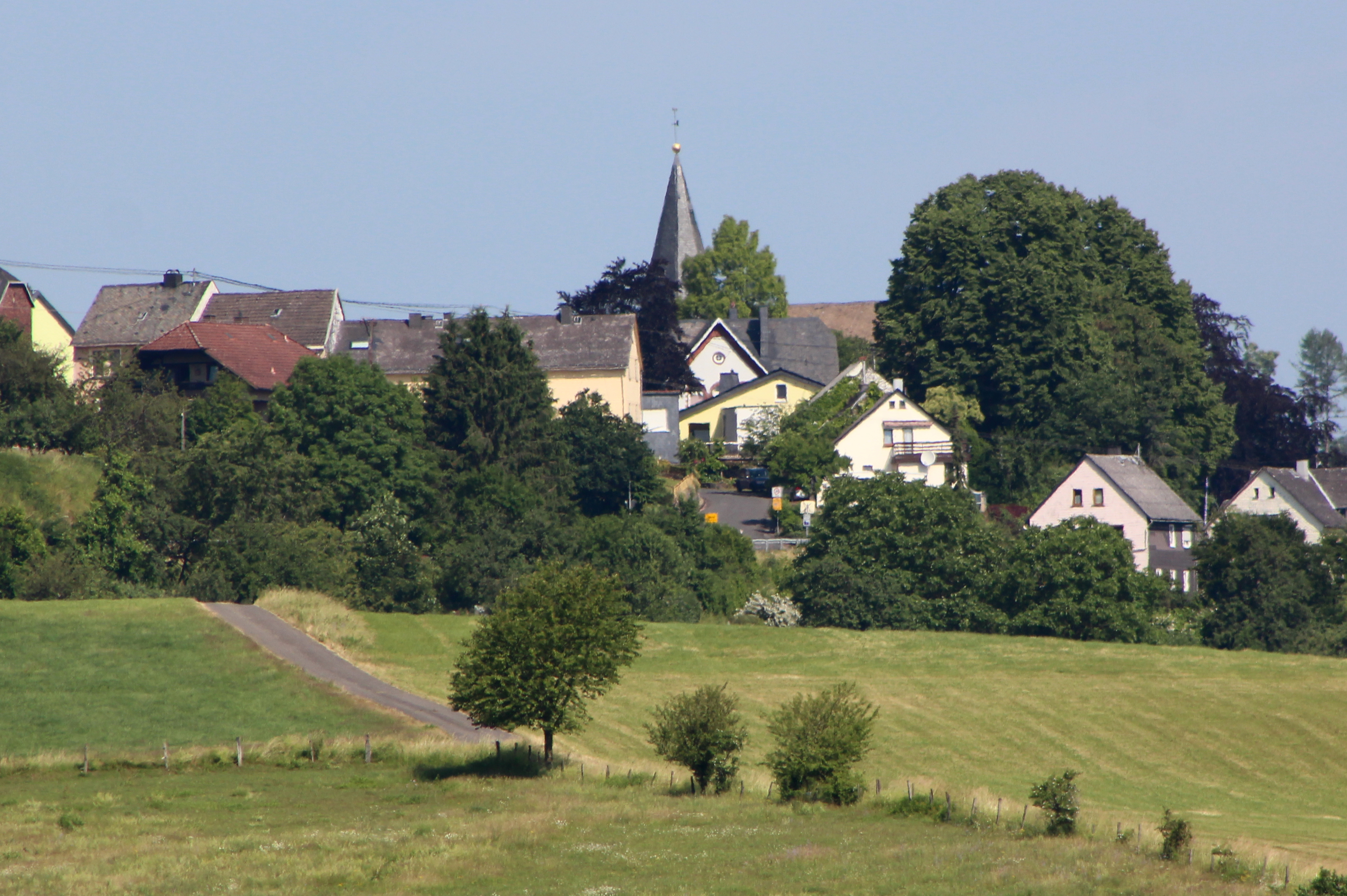

- Coat of arms

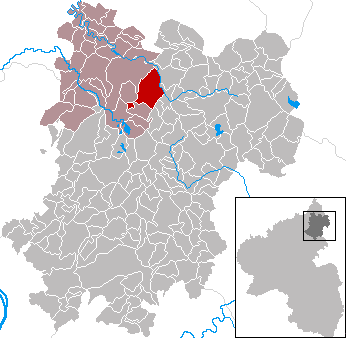
- Location of Alpenrod within Westerwaldkreis district
- Interactive map of Alpenrod
- Location within Germany Location within Rhineland-Palatinate
- Coordinates: 50°37′53″N 7°52′09″E
- Country: Germany
- State: Rhineland-Palatinate
- District: Westerwaldkreis
- Municipal assoc.: Hachenburg
- Subdivisions: 3

Government
  - Mayor (2019–24): Beate Salzer (SPD)

Area
  - Total: 12.15 km^{2} (4.69 sq mi)
- Elevation: 450 m (1,480 ft)

Population (2025-12-31)
  - Total: 1,650
  - Density: 136/km^{2} (352/sq mi)
- Time zone: UTC+01:00 (CET)
  - Summer (DST): UTC+02:00 (CEST)
- Postal codes: 57642
- Dialling codes: 02662
- Vehicle registration: WW
- Website: www.alpenrod.de

Alpenrod is an Ortsgemeinde – a municipality belonging to a Verbandsgemeinde – in the Westerwaldkreis in Rhineland-Palatinate, Germany. The Gräbersberg (513 m above sea level) on the Gemarkung Alpenrod – a rural area attached to the municipality – is the highest point in the Verbandsgemeinde of Hachenburg, a kind of collective municipality. On the Gräbersberg stands an observation tower with a viewing platform 30 m high and open to the public.

== Geography ==
The municipality lies in the Westerwald between Koblenz and Siegen. Flowing through the municipality is the river Große Nister. Alpenrod belongs to the Verbandsgemeinde of Hachenburg, whose seat is in the town of Hachenburg.

Alpenrod’s Ortsteile are Alpenrod, Hirtscheid and Dehlingen.

== History ==
Presumed to be the municipality’s founder is the Vogt (roughly “reeve”) Adalbert von Freusburg. In a document from the year 1320, the village is mentioned for the first time as Albrechtsrode. Here also once stood a castle to guard the ways along the Nichel. However, at least as early as 1131, there had once been a chapel with a small settlement.

The current church’s tower has its roots in this time. Estimates put its beginnings in the 10th century. Alpenrod has two outlying centres, Dehlingen (whose first settler, in 1618, was named Dillinger) and Hirtscheid (meaning “hart border”). Running in the latter by 1551 was a valley mill. Count Salentin Ernst von Manderscheid-Sayn tried more than once (1657; 1678–1680) to get traffic on the Cologne-Frankfurt road – nowadays Bundesstraße 8 – to come through Hachenburg, building a post road which led above Alpenrod, passing by the Neuhof estate, and which is still called the “Post Road” (Poststraße) today. The Cologne-Leipzig road and the Cologne-Frankfurt road were the most important long-distance roads from the time of the Merovingian kings. Since the dale was boggy and not fully passable in the old days, all roadways led over the heights, like the old post road. It is believed that this road was already used in Celtic times.

population development

- 1815 – 889
- 1835 – 921
- 1871 – 888
- 1905 – 914
- 1939 – 1.022
- 1950 – 1.078
- 1961 – 1.047
- 1970 – 1.162
- 1987 – 1.271
- 2005 – 1.601

== Politics ==
The municipal council is made up of 17 council members, including the extraofficial mayor (Bürgermeister), who were elected in a municipal election on 13 June 2004.

| | SPD | Liste Klöckner | Liste Nilges | JUL | Total |
| 2004 | 7 | 3 | 4 | 2 | 16 Seats |
| 2009 | 9 | 2 | 2 | 3 | 16 Seats |

== Economy and infrastructure ==
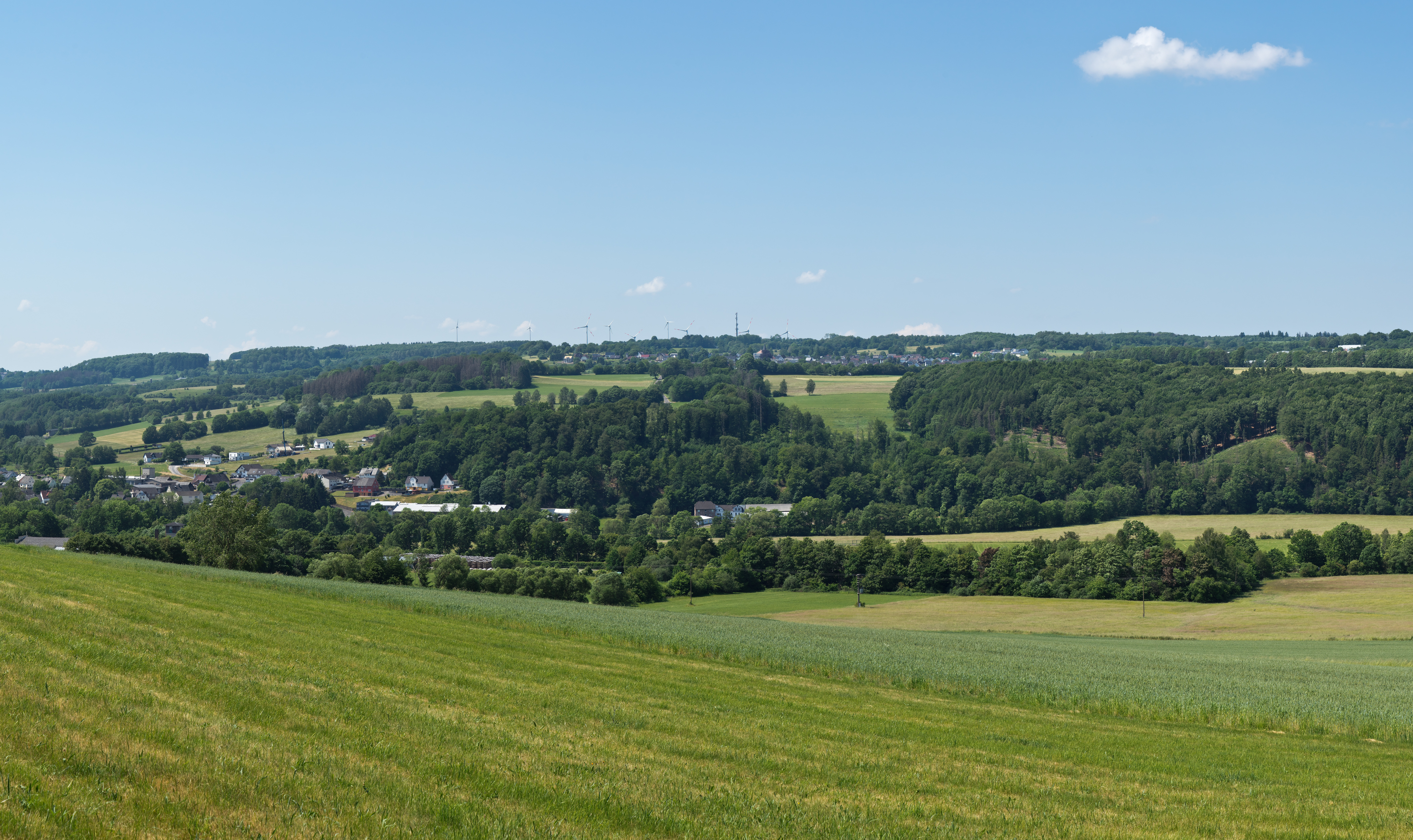
Wind turbines in Alpenrod

Alpenrod is located in the zone number 448 of the public transport association Verkehrsverbund Rhein-Mosel (VRM) and served by the busses of the lines 430, 431 and 433. The municipality lies between Bundesstraßen 255, linking Koblenz and Hachenburg, and 414, leading from Montabaur to Herborn. The A 3 with its Montabaur interchange (AS 40) lies 25 km away. The nearest train station is Büdingen of the Limburg-Altenkirchen railway, RB90, the nearest InterCityExpress stop is the railway station at Montabaur on the Cologne-Frankfurt high-speed rail line. Alpenrod is located on Westerwaldsteig, a long distance walking path from Herborn via Rennerod, Westerburg, Bad Marienberg and Hachenburg to Bad Hönningen and the Wiedweg from Hachenburg via Altenkirchen to Leutesdorf at the Rhine.

The wind farms Alpenrod Süd and Alpenrod Süd-West include nine wind turbines for electricity production.

== Buildings ==
- Observation tower on the Gräbersberg
