= Haidenweiher =

Lake in Germany

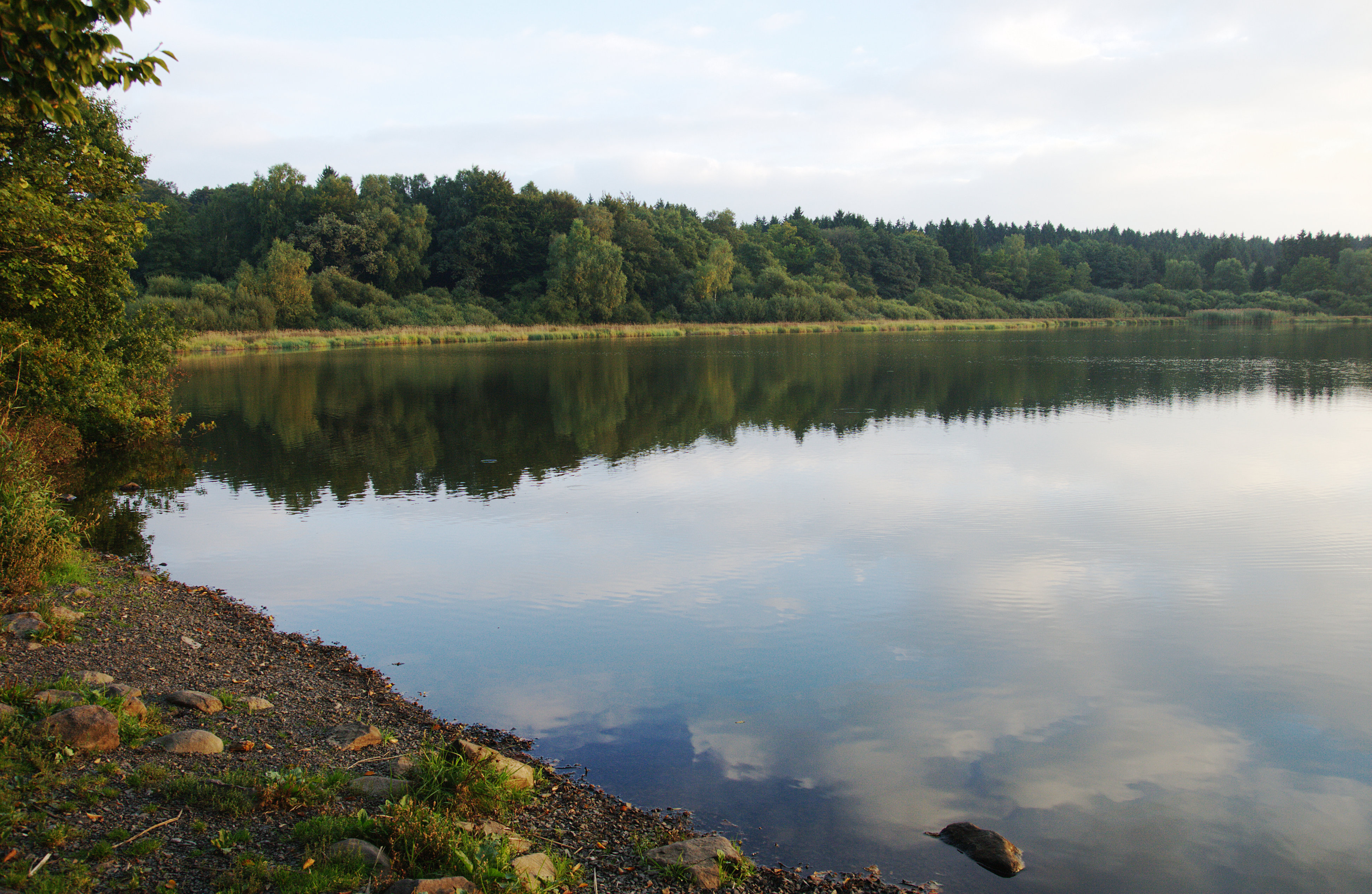
- View of the south shore

- Location within Germany
- Location: Westerwaldkreis, Germany
- Group: Westerwald Lakes
- Coordinates: 50°35′10″N 07°48′52″E
- Type: pond
- Surface area: 30 hectares (74 acres)

The Haidenweiher is a large pond about 1.3 kilometres (0.81 mi) southwest of the village of Dreifelden in the county of Westerwaldkreis in Germany. It has a surface area of c. 30 hectares (74 acres) and is the second largest of the Westerwald Lakes. It is linked to the Dreifelder Weiher by a drainage ditch and is used today for breeding fish. The pond was designated as a nature reserve in 1979 and is surrounded by dense woods. Rare bird species nest along its shores, especially waders.

== History ==
=== Creation ===
The Haidenweiher was laid out by Count Frederick of Wied and first recorded in 1691.
Even at that time the lake, like the others in the Westerwald Lake District, was used for fish farming, a practice which continues today.

=== Origin of the name ===
The name of the pond reflects the countryside at the time it was created. As a result of intensive and centuries-long cattle grazing by the neighbouring villages, the area around the lake became pasture and heathland.

As a result of the habitat, the lapwing which has become rare today, often nested in this region. As a result, its eggs were collected and sold as a delicacy to the castle kitchen in Neuwied.

== Nature reserve ==
On 20 January 1979, the Haidenweiher was designated a nature reserve by the Koblenz. The reserve has an area of about 35 hectares (86 acres) and lies on the terrain of Steinebach an der Wied.

The conservation aim is the preservation of the wetland with its water areas, shallow water zones, marshes and adjacent wet grassland as a site for rare plants and as a habitat for endangered and rare species of animal, especially rare birds, for scientific reasons.
