= Dreifelden =

- Municipality
- Coat of arms

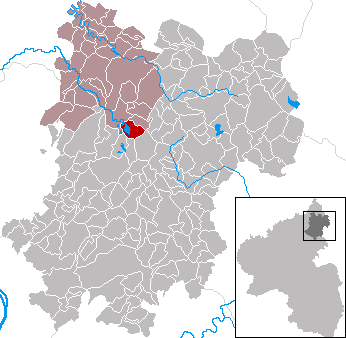
- Location of Dreifelden within Westerwaldkreis district
- Interactive map of Dreifelden
- Location within Germany Location within Rhineland-Palatinate
- Coordinates: 50°35′29″N 7°50′10″E
- Country: Germany
- State: Rhineland-Palatinate
- District: Westerwaldkreis
- Municipal assoc.: Hachenburg

Government
  - Mayor (2019–24): Ralf Scheffler

Area
  - Total: 5.10 km^{2} (1.97 sq mi)
- Elevation: 416 m (1,365 ft)

Population (2025-12-31)
  - Total: 284
  - Density: 55.7/km^{2} (144/sq mi)
- Time zone: UTC+01:00 (CET)
  - Summer (DST): UTC+02:00 (CEST)
- Postal codes: 57629
- Dialling codes: 02666
- Vehicle registration: WW
- Website: www.dreifelden.de

Dreifelden is an Ortsgemeinde – a municipality belonging to a Verbandsgemeinde – in the Westerwaldkreis in Rhineland-Palatinate, Germany. The name translates literally to English as "three fields".

== Geography ==
On the southern boundary of the Verbandsgemeinde of Hachenburg – a kind of collective municipality – in the northwest Westerwaldkreis lies Dreifelden, on the biggest lake found on the Westerwald Lake District (Westerwälder Seenplatte), the Dreifelder Weiher. The Verbandsgemeinde to which the municipality belongs has its seat in the eponymous town.

== History ==
Dreifelden was first recorded in 1319.

In the centre of the village stands Holy Trinity Church (Dreifaltigkeitskirche), the oldest stone church in the Westerwald. Its origins go back to the Romanesque era around 1000 A.D. Until the Reformation it was used as pilgrimage church.

== Politics ==
The municipal council comprises 9 council members, including the extra-official mayor (Bürgermeister), who was elected in a majority vote in a municipal election on 7 June 2009.

== Economy and infrastructure ==
=== Transport ===
Dreifelden is located along the local bus lines 430, 431 and 433, it is located in the zone number 438 of the local public transport association Verkehrsverbund Rhein-Mosel (VRM) and also linked to the long-distance road network by Bundesstraße 8, which joins the municipality to the town centres of Hachenburg (11 km) and Altenkirchen (26 km). The Autobahn interchanges Mogendorf und Dierdorf on the A 3 can be reached over Bundesstraßen 8 and 413. The Hennef interchange on the A 5 (AS 60) can be reached directly on Bundesstraße 8. Dreifelden is located on Westerwaldsteig, a long distance walking path from Herborn via Rennerod, Westerburg, Bad Marienberg and Hachenburg to Bad Hönningen.
