= Westerwald =

Mountain range in Germany

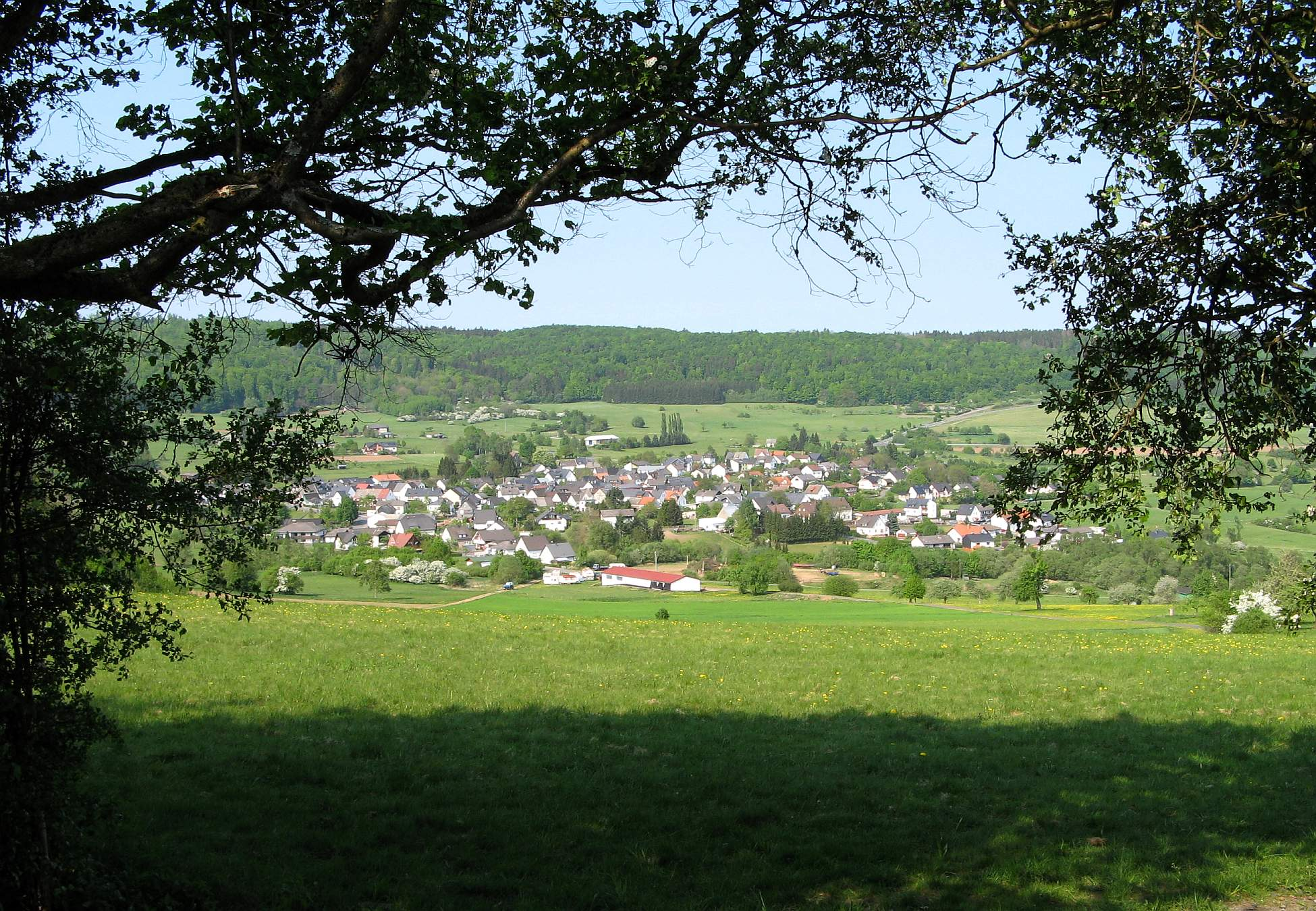
- The Westerwald near Arborn (Greifenstein)

Highest point
- Peak: Fuchskaute
- Elevation: 657.3 m above NN

Dimensions
- Length: 60 km (37 mi)
- Area: 3,000 km^{2} (1,200 mi^{2})

Geography
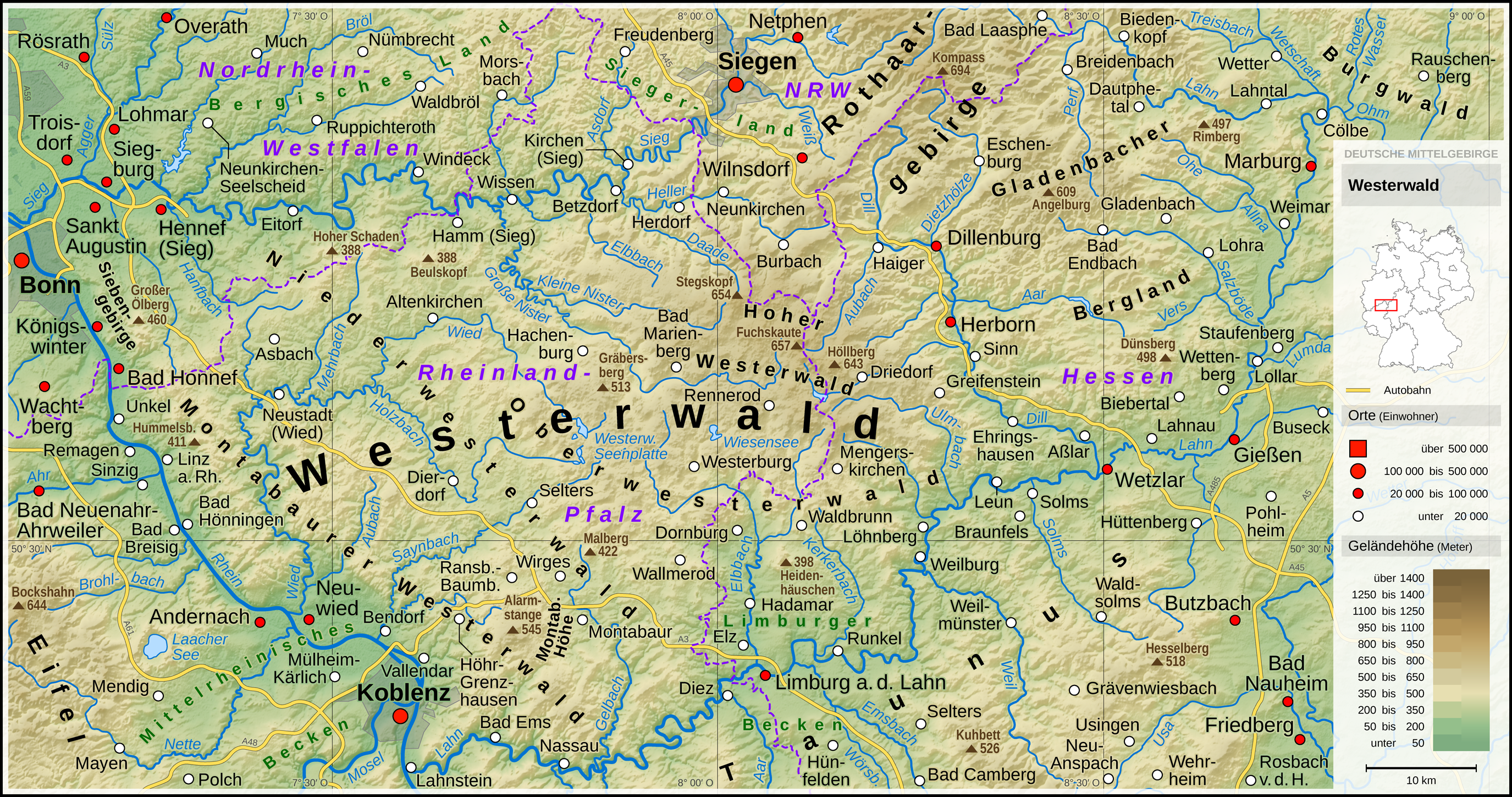
- Westerwald overview map
- State(s): Hesse, North Rhine-Westphalia, Rhineland-Palatinate, Germany
- Range coordinates: 50°40′00″N 7°50′00″E
- Parent range: Rhenish Massif

Geology
- Orogeny: formed as part of the German Central Uplands
- Rock type(s): includes basalt, quartzite, slate

The Westerwald (German pronunciation: [ˈvɛstɐvalt]; literally 'Western forest') is a low mountain range on the right bank of the river Rhine in the German federal states of Rhineland-Palatinate, Hesse and North Rhine-Westphalia. It is a part of the Rhenish Massif (Rheinisches Schiefergebirge or Rhenish Slate Mountains). Its highest elevation, at 657 m above sea level, is the Fuchskaute in the High Westerwald.

Tourist attractions include the Dornburg (394 metres), site of some Celtic ruins from the La Tène times (5th to 1st century BC), found in the community of the same name, and Limburg an der Lahn, a town with a mediaeval centre.

The geologically old, heavily eroded range of the Westerwald is, in its northern parts overlaid by a volcanic upland made of Neogene basalt layers. It covers an area of some 50 km × 70 km (31 mi × 43 mi), and therefore roughly 3,000 km^{2} (1,200 sq mi), making the Westerwald one of Germany's biggest mountain ranges by area. In areas of subsidence, it has in its flatter western part (Lower Westerwald) the characteristics of rolling hills. Typical for the economy of the Upper Westerwald, some 40% of which is actually wooded, are traditional slate mining, clay quarrying, diabase and basalt mining, pottery and the iron ore industry, and among other things mining in the Siegerländer Erzrevier (roughly "Siegerland Ore Grounds"). Despite its relatively slight elevation, the Westerwald has for a low mountain range a typical agreeable climate. Economically and culturally, it belongs among Germany's best known mountain ranges.

The name "Westerwald" was first mentioned in 1048 in a document from the Electorate of Trier and described at that time the woodlands (Wald is German for "forest" or "woods") around the three churches in Bad Marienberg, Rennerod and Emmerichenhain, west of the royal court at Herborn. Only since the mid 19th century has the name come into common usage for the whole range.

The High Westerwald has since the Middle Ages formed the heart of the Herrschaft zum (also vom or auf dem) Westerwald ("Lordship over the Westerwald"). This comprised the three court districts of Marienberg, Emmerichenhain and Neukirch. The Lordship later fell under the governance of the Lordship or County of Beilstein.

== Geography ==
=== Location ===
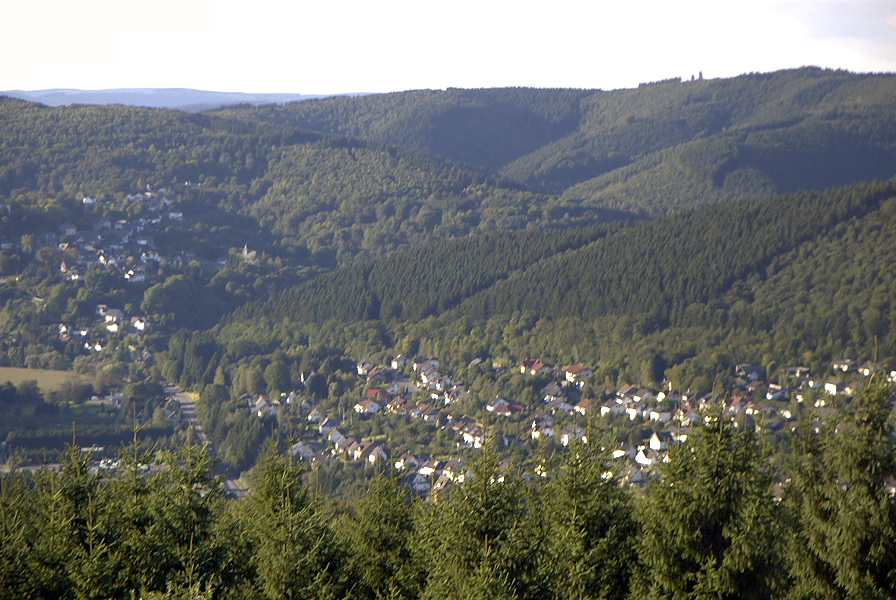
View of the northern Westerwald from the Otto Turm at Herkersdorf/Kirchen

The Westerwald lies mostly southwest of the three-state common point shared by Rhineland-Palatinate, Hesse and North Rhine-Westphalia in the districts of Altenkirchen, Lahn-Dill, Limburg-Weilburg, Neuwied, Rhein-Lahn, Rhein-Sieg, Westerwaldkreis and partly in Siegen-Wittgenstein. It is found south of the Rothaargebirge, southwest of the Lahn-Dill-Bergland (another low mountain range), north of the Taunus and east of the Middle Rhine and stretches more or less southwards from Siegen and Burbach, southwestwards from Haiger, northwestwards from Weilburg, northwards from Limburg an der Lahn, northeastwards from Koblenz, eastwards from Linz am Rhein, southeastwards from Wissen and southwards from Betzdorf. In its centre lie Bad Marienberg and Hachenburg.

Clockwise, the Westerwald is bordered by the following river valleys: the Rhine between Koblenz and Linz, the Sieg as far as Betzdorf, the Heller, the Dill and from its mouth near Wetzlar, the Lahn up to Lahnstein.

Geomorphologically, the Westerwald belongs to the Rhenish Massif, which forms the greater part of that range's eastern half on the Rhine's right bank. Likewise, the Gladenbach Uplands, lying east of the Dill, also belong to the Westerwald, whereas the mountains reaching up to 680 m (2,230 ft) near the Haiger Saddle (Haiger Sattel) and east of Siegen are counted as part of the Rothaargebirge.

=== The Westerwald's regions ===
The Westerwald is divided by elevation into these three regions:

- Unterer or Vorderer Westerwald, or Vorderwesterwald:

Translated here as Lower Westerwald, this region borders on the Rhine and Lahn river valley landscapes and manifests itself as the western and southwestern part of the Westerwald, a heavily truncated upland with elevations ranging from 200 to 400 m. The subsidence areas found within (Dierdorfer Senke, Montabaurer Senke) are known for their clay deposits. Indeed, the name for this small region is the Kannenbäckerland, or "Jug Bakers’ Land", a reference to the traditional ceramics industry here. In the southwest, in the richly wooded Montabaur Heights (Montabaurer Höhe) is found a monadnock made of quartzite, as well as the Malberg Conservation Area (Naturschutzgebiet Malberg). The Siebengebirge joining the range in the northwest near Bonn (reaching 464 m) is, however, regionally grouped with the Middle Rhine area.

- Oberer Westerwald:

Translated here as Upper Westerwald, this is a partly wooded land of volcanic crests with major basalt layers, above all in the area of the Westerwald Lake Plateau (Westerwälder Seenplatte), with elevations ranging from some 350 to 500 m. To the south, as part of the Lahn valley, the hilly Limburg Basin abuts the Upper Westerwald.

- Hoher Westerwald:

The High Westerwald is an undulating and basalt-rich tableland decked with woodlands, making for a highly moderated microclimate, especially against extreme warmth. It ranges from roughly 450 to 657 m in height. Here is found the Fuchskaute, the highest peak.

=== Climate ===
The climate of the region vastly qualifies as oceanic (Köppen climate classification: Cfb), while higher altitudes experience a humid continental climate (Köppen climate classification: Dfb).

In the lowlands of the Lower Westerwald, summers tend to be warm to hot. Erratic convective downpours are not uncommon, yet mostly brief. Winters are mild and see a lot of precipitation, which mostly falls as rain. Snowfall occurs multiple times a year, but usually melts within hours. Thermophilic fruits like figs and peaches are hardy in this area.

The mountainous areas of the Upper Westerwald and the High Westerwald feature a much colder climate and are more prone to extreme weather, such as extreme wind gusts during extratropical cyclones. Summer days are pleasantly warm and rarely become hot due to a cool breeze, while winters are cold and rich in snow. The area is home to a number of ski areas.

=== Places ===
District seats in the Westerwald are: Altenkirchen (Altenkirchen district), Montabaur (Westerwaldkreis) and Neuwied (Neuwied district). Furthermore, the Lahn-Dill-Kreis, the Mayen-Koblenz district, the Rhein-Lahn-Kreis and the Limburg-Weilburg district each have shares of the Westerwald. If Sieg is taken as the Westerwald's northernmost limit, then the Rhein-Sieg district likewise belongs here, at least in parts (for example the Siebengebirge and the communities of Eitorf and Windeck).

=== Transport connections ===
The Westerwald is covered by the four public local transport associations Rhein-Main-Verkehrsverbund (RMV), Verkehrsverbund Rhein-Sieg (VRS), Verkehrsverbund Rhein-Mosel (VRM) and Westfalentarif.

Several local bus lines connect the villages and small towns to one another, and city buses run to Bonn, Koblenz, Limburg and Siegen.

Important local train lines run along the banks of the Rhine, Lahn, Dill and Sieg, and there are as well the lower Westerwald railway RB29 (Limburg - Siershahn), the Westerwald-Sieg-Bahn, RB90 (Limburg - Diez Ost - Westerburg - Hachenburg - Altenkirchen - Au (Sieg) - Betzdorf (Sieg) - Siegen), RB96 (Betzdorf - Herdorf - Haiger - Dillenburg and the RB97, Daade valley railway (Betzdorf - Daaden.

The most notable railway is the Cologne-Frankfurt high-speed rail line with minor stops at Montabaur and Limburg an der Lahn.

The Westerwald and its outer edges are crossed by stretches of Bundesstraßen 8, 42, 49, 54, 62, 255, 256, 277, 413 and 414, over which there are connections to the Autobahnen A 3 (Cologne–Frankfurt), A 45 (Dortmund–Aschaffenburg) and A 48.

The High Westerwald is served by Siegerland Airport for private use and special touristic charters, south of Burbach.

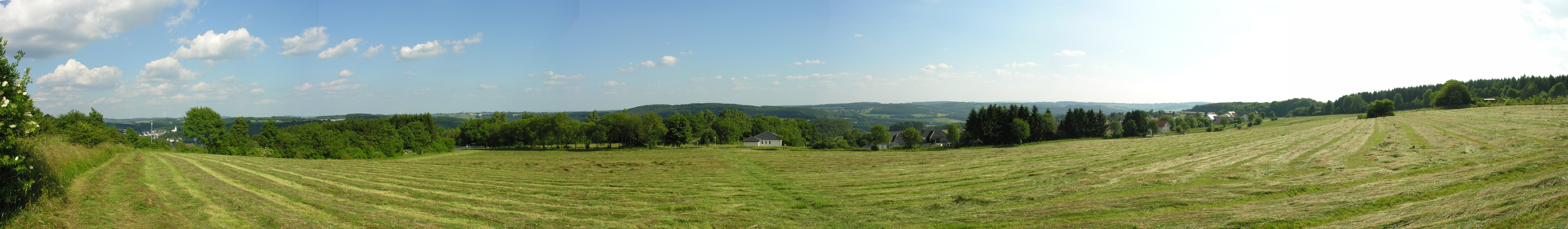
Panorama of the Westerwald seen from Bad Marienberg
Panorama of the Westerwald seen from the lookout tower on the Gräbersberg

== Geology ==
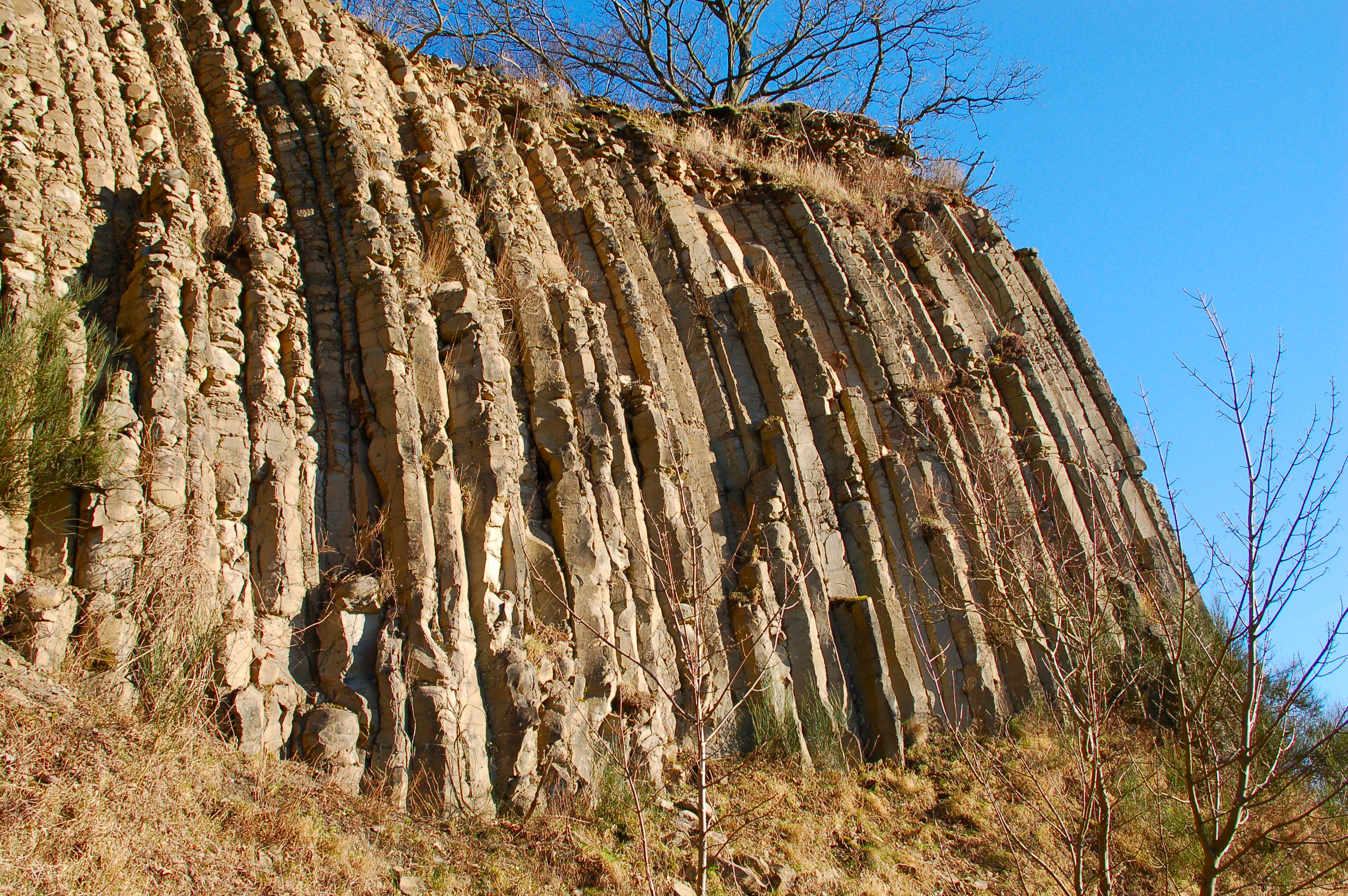
Basalt columns at the Hummelsberg

Geologically, the Westerwald is part of the Rhenish Massif, and likewise represents a heavily eroded remnant of a great Variscan mountain system which in the Mesozoic characterized a great deal of Europe.

The Devonian bedrock is covered by volcanic masses from the Tertiary, particularly basalt and tuffs. Economically important, besides slate, limestone and clay quarrying, were, and still are, iron and its processing industry between Rheintal (Unkel, Linz) and the lower Wied, pumice gravel in the Neuwied Basin, various mineral springs and, once, brown coal mining.

The whole Westerwald region lay under a tropically warm arm of the sea in the Palaeozoic (600 to 270 million years ago). This sea deposited layers of sediments many kilometres thick into the Variscan geosyncline, which were heavily folded in the orogeny that followed. The towns of Siegen and Koblenz on the Westerwald's north and southwest edges even gave two Lower Devonian layers, with their colourful slates, their names. The upper mountain layers are formed of volcanic strata made of basalt containing tuffs.

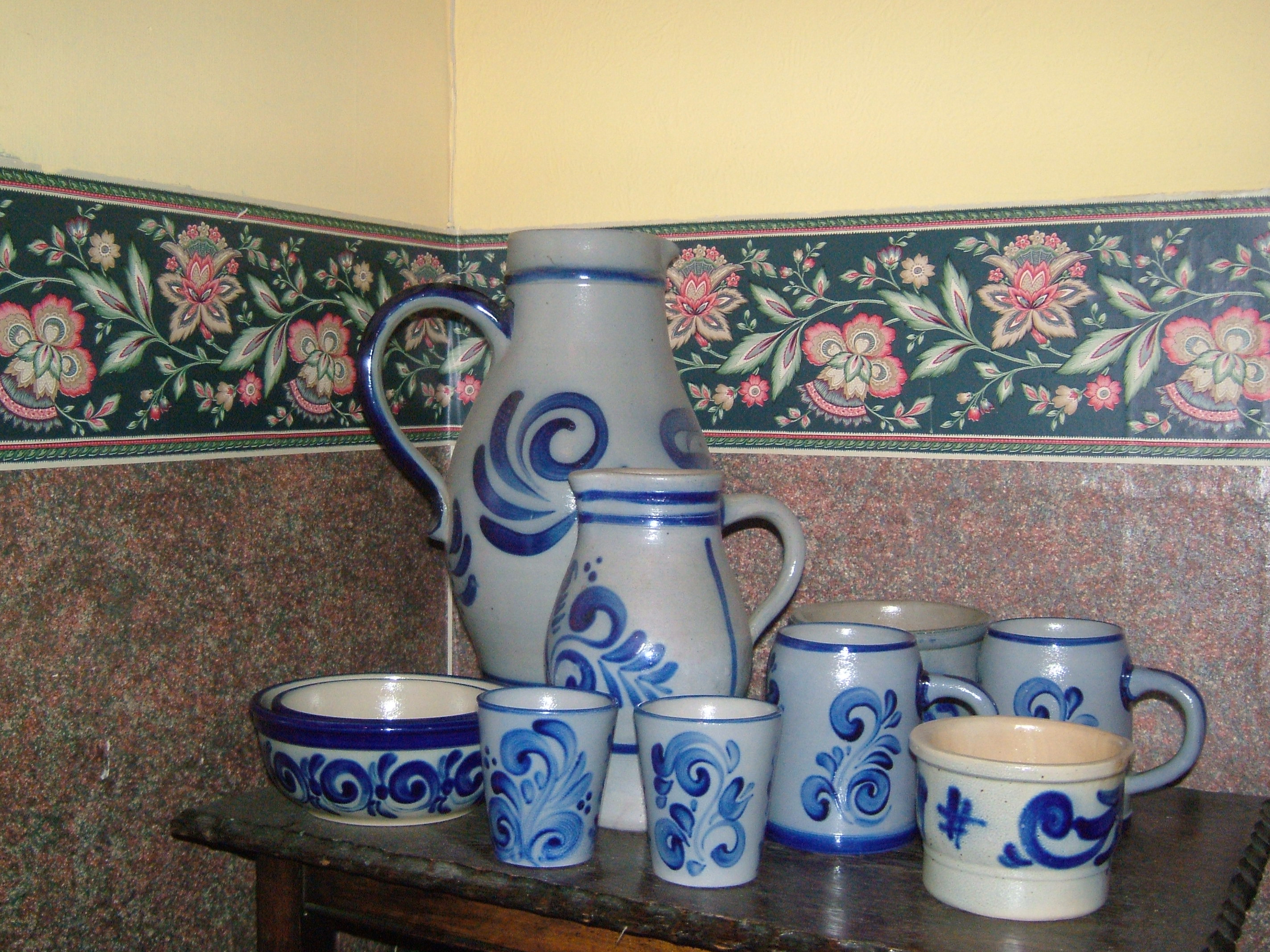
Typical everyday Westerwald pottery

In a few areas, slate and clay have long been quarried, the latter notably in the so-called Kannenbäckerland, but also in a few other places where the clay is worked into the salt-glazed grey Westerwald Pottery with cobalt blue decoration. The pottery industry is centred on Höhr-Grenzhausen. Exports, particularly to Italy, are also important (more than one million metric tons each year). In the mid 16th century, potters from Raeren in Belgium migrated into the Westerwald, bringing with them some of their moulds. This type of pottery was taken to the New World and was found in the early Chesapeake settlements. Today one finds not only highly crafted moulded vases and mugs but also a range of handcrafted utility ware, with hand-painted swirling floral motifs.

In the eastern Westerwald (the part lying in Hesse) are found interesting limestone deposits from the most varied of geological times. Erdbach limestone from the Lower Carboniferous gave one small time period the name "Erdbachian".

Near Breitscheid are found the remnants of an atoll from the subtropical Devonian sea that was here 380,000,000 years ago. Parts of this limestone formation are worked in open-pit mining; near Enspel, a "fossil conservation area" has been instituted, in which institutes from several colleges conduct research and excursions. A few karst caves are of interest to spelaeology and bring about the temporary disappearance and reappearance of the Erdbach.

== Mountains ==
The Westerwald's highest mountain is the Fuchskaute in the High Westerwald, meaning "fox hollow". Many peaks and crests exceed the 600-metre level. Sorted by elevation above sea level, these are some of the Westerwald's highest elevations:

- Fuchskaute (657 m), near Willingen, Westerwaldkreis, Rhineland-Palatinate
- Stegskopf (654 m), near Emmerzhausen, Altenkirchen district, Rhineland-Palatinate
- Salzburger Kopf (653 m), near Salzburg, Westerwaldkreis, Rhineland-Palatinate
- Höllberg (643 m), near Driedorf, Lahn-Dill-Kreis, Hesse
- Auf der Baar (618 m), near Driedorf/Breitscheid, Lahn-Dill-Kreis, Hesse
- Barstein (614 m), near Breitscheid, Lahn-Dill-Kreis, Hesse
- Knoten (605 m), near Driedorf, Lahn-Dill-Kreis, Hesse
- Die Höh (598 m), near Burbach, Siegen-Wittgenstein, North Rhine-Westphalia
- Alarmstange (542.2 m), near Horresen, Westerwaldkreis, Rhineland-Palatinate
- Köppel (540 m), near Montabaur, Westerwaldkreis, Rhineland-Palatinate
- Hohenseelbachskopf (530 m), near Daaden, Siegen-Wittgenstein and Altenkirchen district, North Rhine-Westphalia and Rhineland-Palatinate
- Gräbersberg (513.1 m), near Alpenrod, Westerwaldkreis, Rhineland-Palatinate
- Mahlscheid (509 m), near Herdorf, Siegen-Wittgenstein and Altenkirchen district, North Rhine-Westphalia and Rhineland-Palatinate
- Malberg (422 m), near Ötzingen, Westerwaldkreis, Rhineland-Palatinate
- Hummelsberg (389 m), near Linz am Rhein, Neuwied district, Rhineland-Palatinate
- Beulskopf (388 m), near Altenkirchen, Altenkirchen district, Rhineland-Palatinate
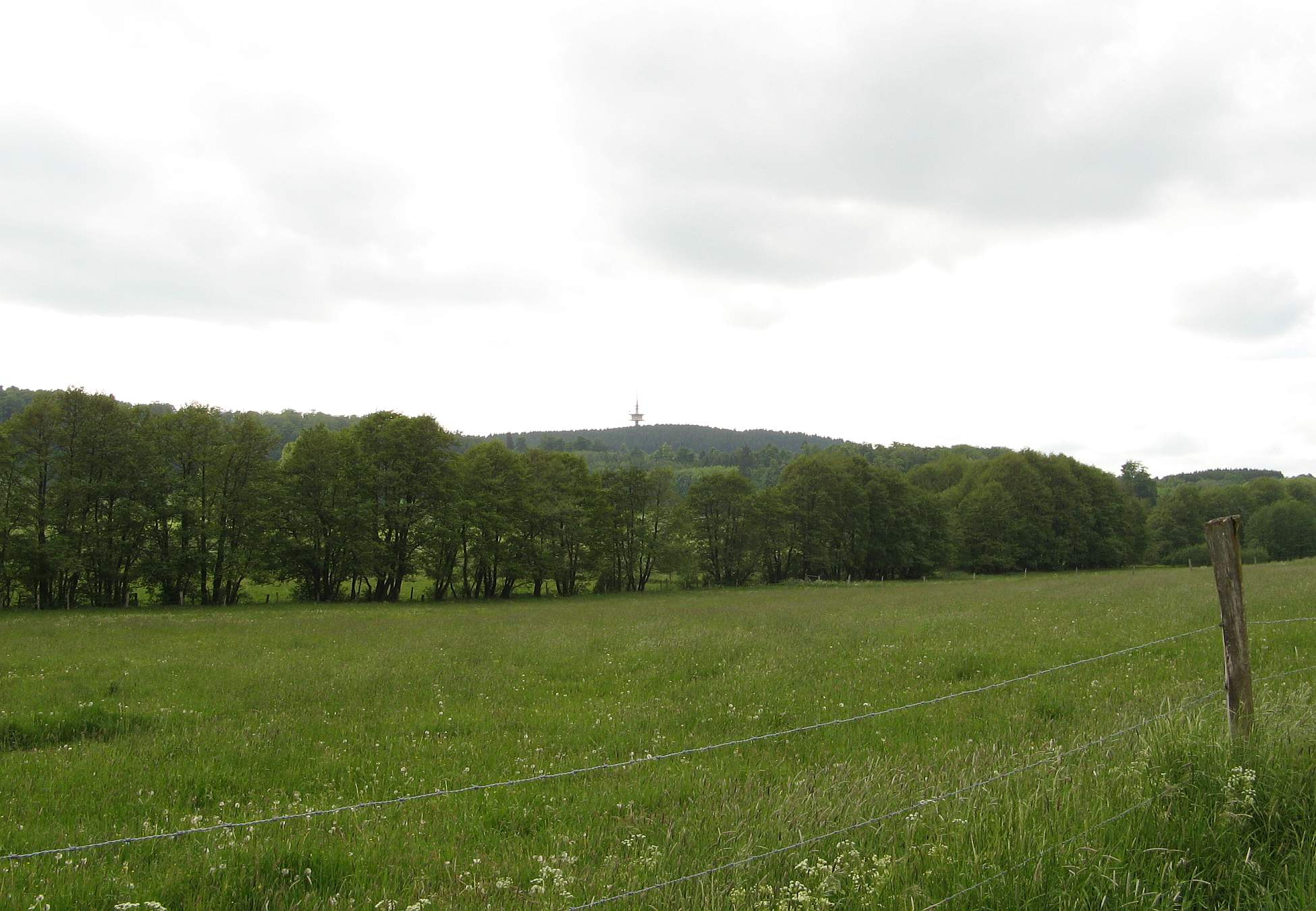
Höllberg

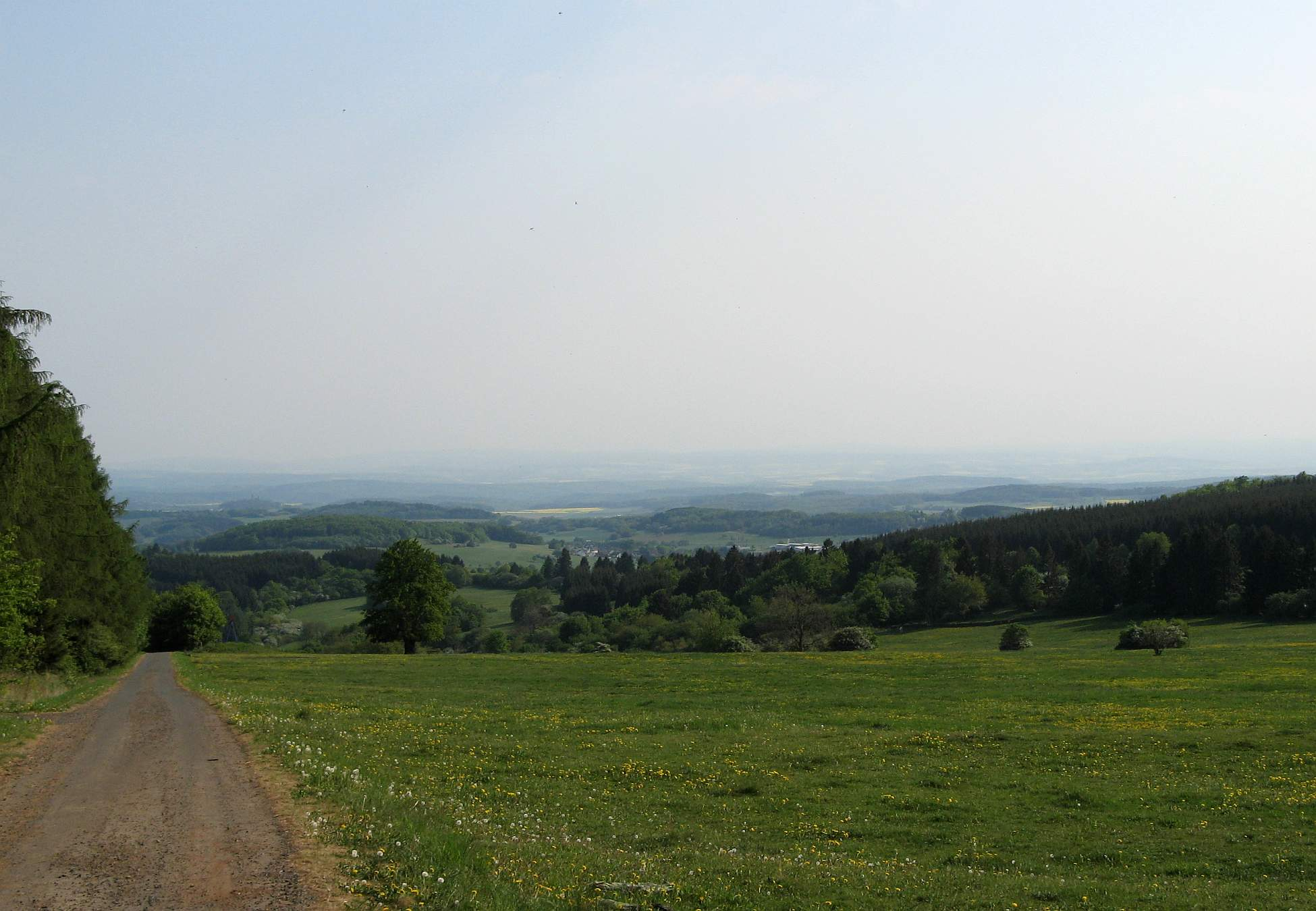
View from the Knoten

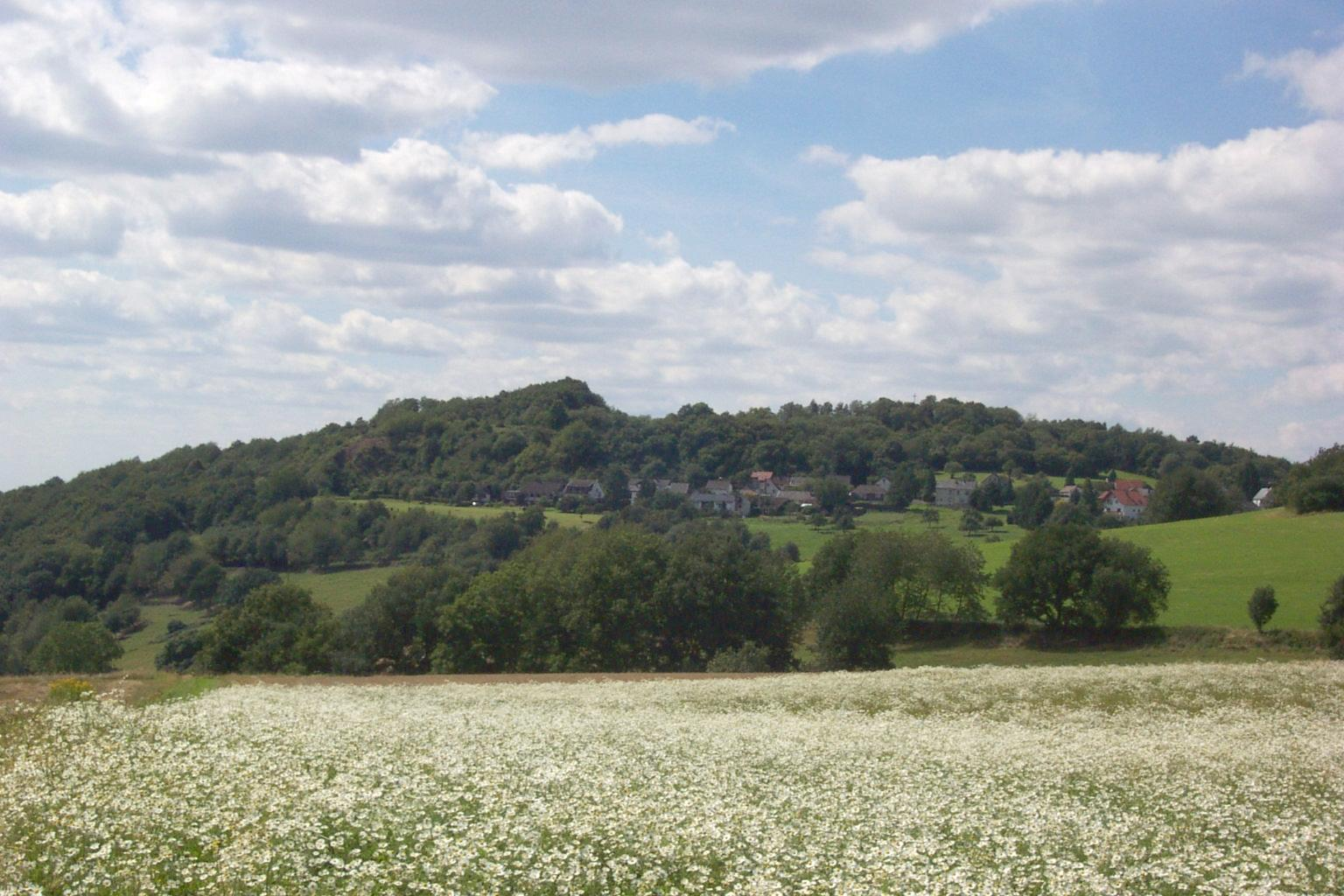
Hummelsberg

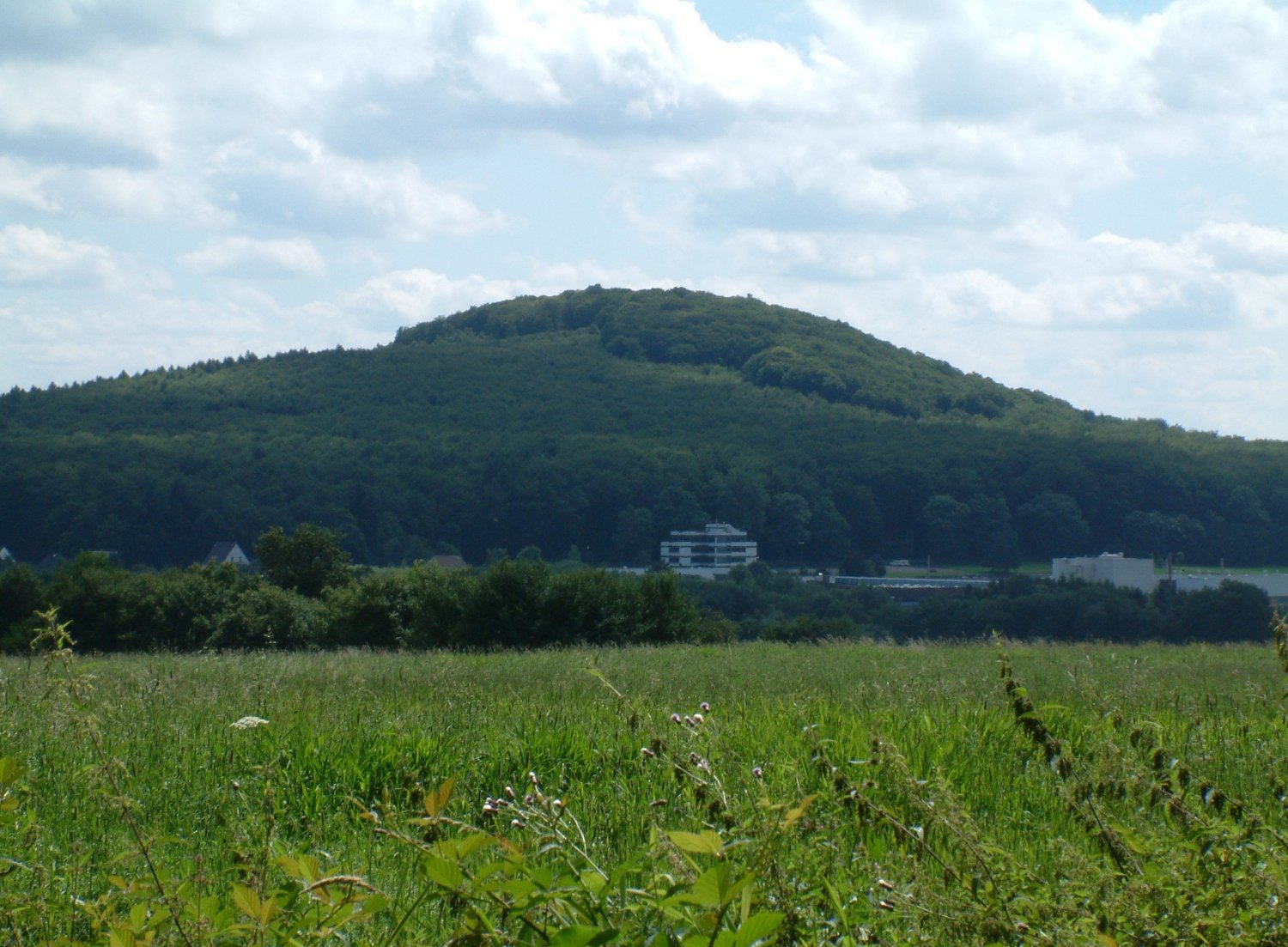
Malberg

== Waterways ==
=== Flowing waters ===
The following are the Westerwald's rivers and streams:

- Rivers whose valley systems border the range (clockwise):
  - Rhine – southwest edge
  - Sieg – north edge
  - Dill – east edge, tributary to the Lahn
  - Lahn – southeast edge
- Smaller rivers within the range:
  - Mehrbach
  - Sayn (also known as Saynbach) – in the southern (Lower) Westerwald, flows west to the Rhine
  - Wied (between Sieg and Sayn) – flows west to the Rhine
  - Nister (in the northeast, boundary of Upper Westerwald) – flows northwest to the Sieg
  - Elbbach (Sieg) – near Wissen to the Sieg
  - Heller – rises in northern Westerwald and flows through the Siegerland to Betzdorf and into the Sieg
  - Elbbach (Lahn) – near Ailertchen to the Lahn
  - Daade – empties between Alsdorf and Grünebach into the Heller
- Greater streams and brooks:
  - Aubach, Brexbach, Dietzhölze, Erdbach, Fockenbach, Gelbach, Hellerbach, Holzbach, Kerkerbach, Masselbach, Ulmbach.

=== Standing waters ===
- Breitenbach Reservoir (Rennerod)
- Driedorf Reservoir
- Großer Weiher
- Fischweiher
- Heisterberger Weiher
- Krombach Reservoir
- Seeweiher near Mengerskirchen
- Waagweiher
- Waldsee Maroth
- Westerwald Lake District
  - Brinkenweiher
  - Dreifelder Weiher (or Seeweiher)
  - Haidenweiher
  - Hausweiher
  - Hofmannsweiher
  - Postweiher
  - Wölferlinger Weiher
- Wiesensee (reservoir)

Weiher is a German word meaning "pond".

== History ==
=== Early times ===
Through prehistoric finds it can be determined that the Celts settled in the Westerwald and were using the iron ore deposits in the so-called Hallstatt times (Iron Age, roughly 750 to 500 BC). In all likelihood they came into the area from the Hunsrück. From La Tène times come the Celtic ringwall-girded defensive and sheltering castles which may be found on, among other peaks, the Malberg. Already by La Tène times, Germanic peoples were thrusting in from the east and from the Sieg valley. They came about 380 BC into the Upper Westerwald, bypassing the High Westerwald, seeing it as nothing more than a trackless wooded wilderness, after which they eventually came up against the Rhine in the 2nd century.

=== Roman times ===
Even in the time when the Celts found themselves having to avoid the Germanic invaders by moving to the west, the Romans were also pushing in from the Rhine's left bank to the southwest. However, the Romans only managed to seize a strip of land on the Rhine's right bank and the so-called Rhine-Westerwald; the Westerwald itself lay outside the Roman-occupied area, for the Romans preferred to maintain a little-settled, most likely pathless wilderness as their border.

=== Chatti times ===
The Westerwald's permanent settlement and thereby its territorial history began with the Chatti (Hessians) pushing their way into the area after the Romans were driven out in the 3rd century. Placename endings such as –ar, –mar and –aha ("Haigraha" = Haiger) stemming from the Migration Period ("Völkerwanderung") can still be found now. These lie around the forest's outer edges in basins and dales whose soils and climate were favourable to early settlers, and include, for instance, Hadamar, Lahr and Wetzlar. From the 4th to the 6th century, the settlements from the time of the taking of the land arose in formerly pathless areas, taking endings such as –ingen and –heim, like Bellingen and Bladernheim; these lie on the broad, raised plains in the Upper Westerwald.

=== Frankish times ===
The Franks built their old settlements on the edge of the Westerwald in the central areas of their districts, to build up slowly and permanently strongholds in the interior. There arose places with names ending in –rode, –scheid, –hahn, –berg, –tal and –seifen. Once clearing settlements had been established and logging for iron ore smelting was under way, the widespread destruction of the forest began. Between the 6th and 9th centuries came settlement expansion from the old settlements towards the edges, a process still witnessed in placename endings such as –hausen, –hofen, –kirch, –burg or –tal.

=== Middle Ages ===
The last settlement period in the Westerwald began in the 10th century and ended about 1300. Through Carolingian policy and therefore the Trier and Cologne mission, this area underwent Christianization. Trier advanced up the Lahn, Cologne to the Rhine and Sieg. Trier-Lorrainian and Lower Rhine influences were nevertheless brought into the Westerwald. Among the witnesses to the art of building at that time is the monastery church at Limburg-Dietkirchen, in its oldest parts.

After many changes in ownership between the Ottonian and Salian noble families, it was in the end the Counts of Sayn, Diez and Wied who managed to take hold of extensive landholdings. Particular importance was achieved by the Counts of Laurenburg, who later called themselves the Counts of Nassau. In the east, the Landgraves of Hesse put it about that they could beat the Archbishopric of Mainz on the battlefield. Moreover, the Counts of Wied, the Counts of Sayn-Wittgenstein and the Electorate of Trier were all prominent landlords.

=== Modern times ===
Political relations were simplified until the 16th century. Among the four greater powers' spheres of influence (Mainz, Cologne, Trier, Hesse), the House of Nassau managed to expand and strengthen its hold on its territory on the Dill between Siegen and Nassau. After the Napoleonic upheavals, Nassau had to share broad swathes of the Westerwald with the newly minted power Prussia. A sovereign Duchy of Nassau existed until it was annexed by Prussia in 1866.

Nowadays, the Westerwald is shared among three German federal states: Hesse, North Rhine-Westphalia and Rhineland-Palatinate.

== Notable people ==
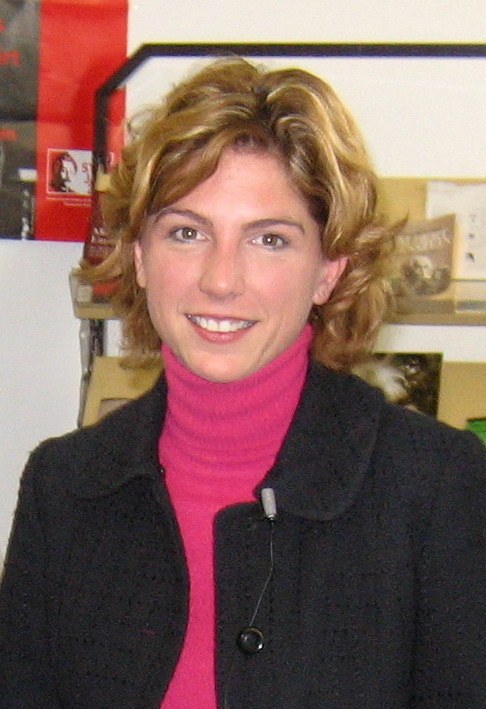
Sabine Bätzing

- John Peter Altgeld (Governor of Illinois)
- August Sander photographer
- Sabine Bätzing (German politician, SPD)
- Hans-Arthur Bauckhage (German politician, FDP)
- Johann Wilhelm Bausch (Bishop of Limburg 1834–1840)
- Joseph Blank (German politician, CDU)
- Kim Petras, singer-song writer
- Theodor Blank (former Federal minister, CDU)
- Wilhelm Boden (German politician, CDU; Premier of Rhineland-Palatinate 1946–1947)
- Katja Burkard (German television moderator)
- Dieter Cunz (professor of German, Ohio State University)
- Paul Deussen (German philosophic historian and Indologist)
- Paul Dickopf (co-founder of the BKA)
- Ralph Dommermuth (entrepreneur)
- Thomas Enders (manager)
- Dominik Eulberg (electronic music artist and disc jockey)
- Dieter Fritsch (German surveyor)
- Erhard Geyer (former Federal Chairman of the German Officials’ Federation)
- Frank Göbler (German Slavist)
- Paul A. Grimm (German artist)
- Dieter Hackler (Federal Commissioner for the Civil Service 1991–2006)
- Annegret Held (German writer)
- Hendrik Hering (German politician, SPD)
- Joseph Höffner (Bishop of Münster 1962–1969 and Archbishop of Cologne 1969–1987)
- Joachim Hörster (German politician CDU, Member of the Bundestag)

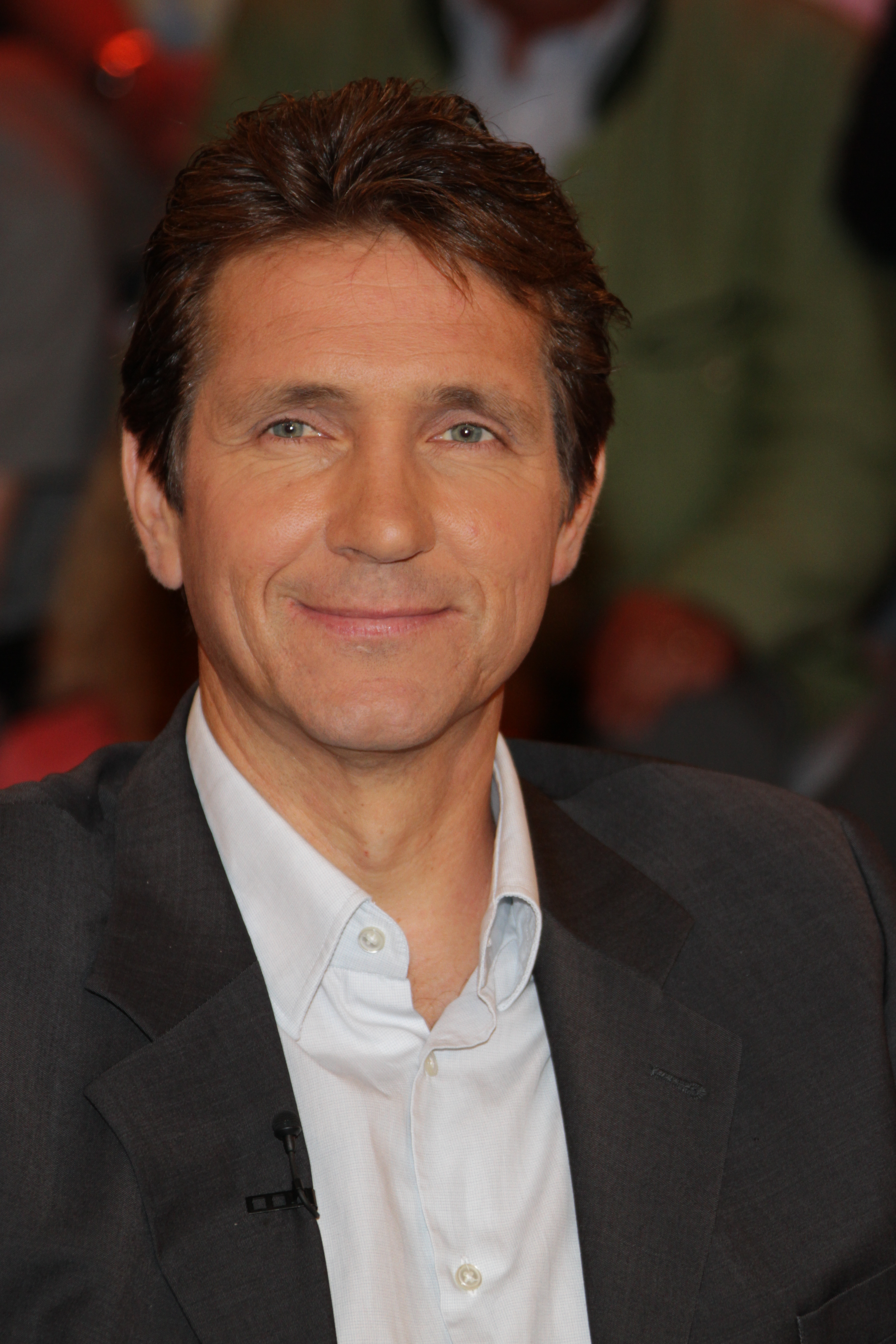
Bodo Illgner

- Bodo Illgner (German national football player)
- Johannes Kalpers (German singer)
- Kaspar Kögler (German painter and poet)
- Georg Leber (former Federal minister, SPD)
- Franz Leuninger (Resistance fighter against the National Socialist régime, died 1945)
- Ernst Lindemann (German naval officer, Captain of the Bismarck)
- Peter, Manfred, Uwe and Günter Ludolf, the main producers of the television series Die Ludolfs
- Heinrich August Luyken (German writer in Esperanto)
- Johann Ludwig von Nassau-Hadamar (German prince)
- Hanns-Josef Ortheil (German writer)
- Friedrich Wilhelm Raiffeisen (German social reformer)
- Mike Rockenfeller (German racecar driver)
- Gerhard Roth (German politician, SPD)
- Barbara Rudnik (German actress)
- Rudolf Scharping (German politician, SPD)
- Dirk Schiefen (German musician)
- Jan Schlaudraff (German national football player)
- Dominik Schwaderlapp (Vicar-General of the Archbishopric of Cologne)
- Gerd Silberbauer (German actor)
- Martin Stadtfeld (German pianist)

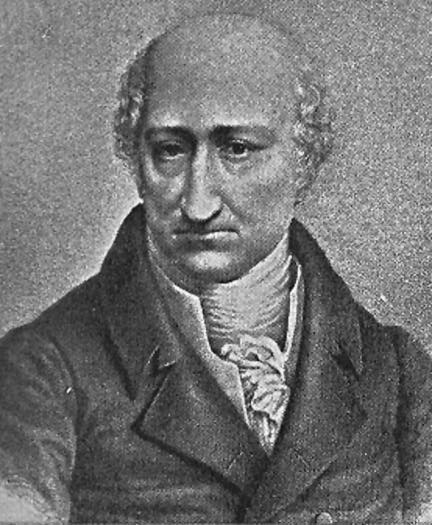
Heinrich Friedrich Karl vom Stein

- Heinrich Friedrich Karl vom Stein (Prussian politician)
- Hermann Heinrich Traut (German librarian)
- Johann Philipp von Walderdorf (as Johann IX Elector and Archbishop of Trier 1756–1768, Prince-Bishop of Worms 1763–1768)
- Erich Wenderoth (German jurist and co-founder of the Rheinische Post)
- Siegfried von Westerburg (Archbishop of Cologne 1275–1297)
- Clemens Wilmenrod (German television cook)

== Westerwaldlied ==
The Westerwald is also internationally known in songs, above all in folksongs, and particularly the "Westerwaldlied" ("Westerwald Song"), as well as "Westerwald-Marsch" ("Westerwald March"), "Westerwald, du bist so schön" ("Westerwald, you are so lovely"), the "Neues Westerwaldlied" ("New Westerwald Song") by songwriter Ulrik Remy, "Ich bin aus 'm Westerwald" ("I am from the Westerwald") and "Das schönste Mädchen vom Westerwald" ("The Loveliest Girl from the Westerwald") by Karl-Eberhard Hain and Jürgen Hardeck, made well known by De Höhner, Die Schröders and other groups.

The "Westerwaldlied" is also sung by the Chilean Armed Forces and is known as "Himno de la Sección". It is also the inspiration for the South Korean military song, "Our Nation Forever". In recent years it has become somewhat controversial in Germany due to its origins during the National Socialist era, with the German military ceasing performances of it in 2017.

== Other ==
The standard German term for a Westerwald dweller is Westerwälder (IPA: [ˈvɛstɐvɛldɐ]; plural: same), but they are also popularly known as Basaltköpp (“Basalt Heads”), as they are said to be thickheaded, and they live in a basalt-rich region. Wäller is another vernacular name for them.

One of the 12 best-rated hiking trails in Germany is the Westerwaldsteig. The Westerwaldsteig crosses the Westerwald from east (Herborn) to west (Rhine).

== Bibliography ==
- Hermann Josef Roth: Naturkundliche Bibliographie des rechtsrheinischen Schiefergebirges zwischen Lahn und Sieg (= Planaria, 3). Overath 1989, ISSN 0931-3737
