= Dansenberg =

- Stadtteil of Kaiserslautern
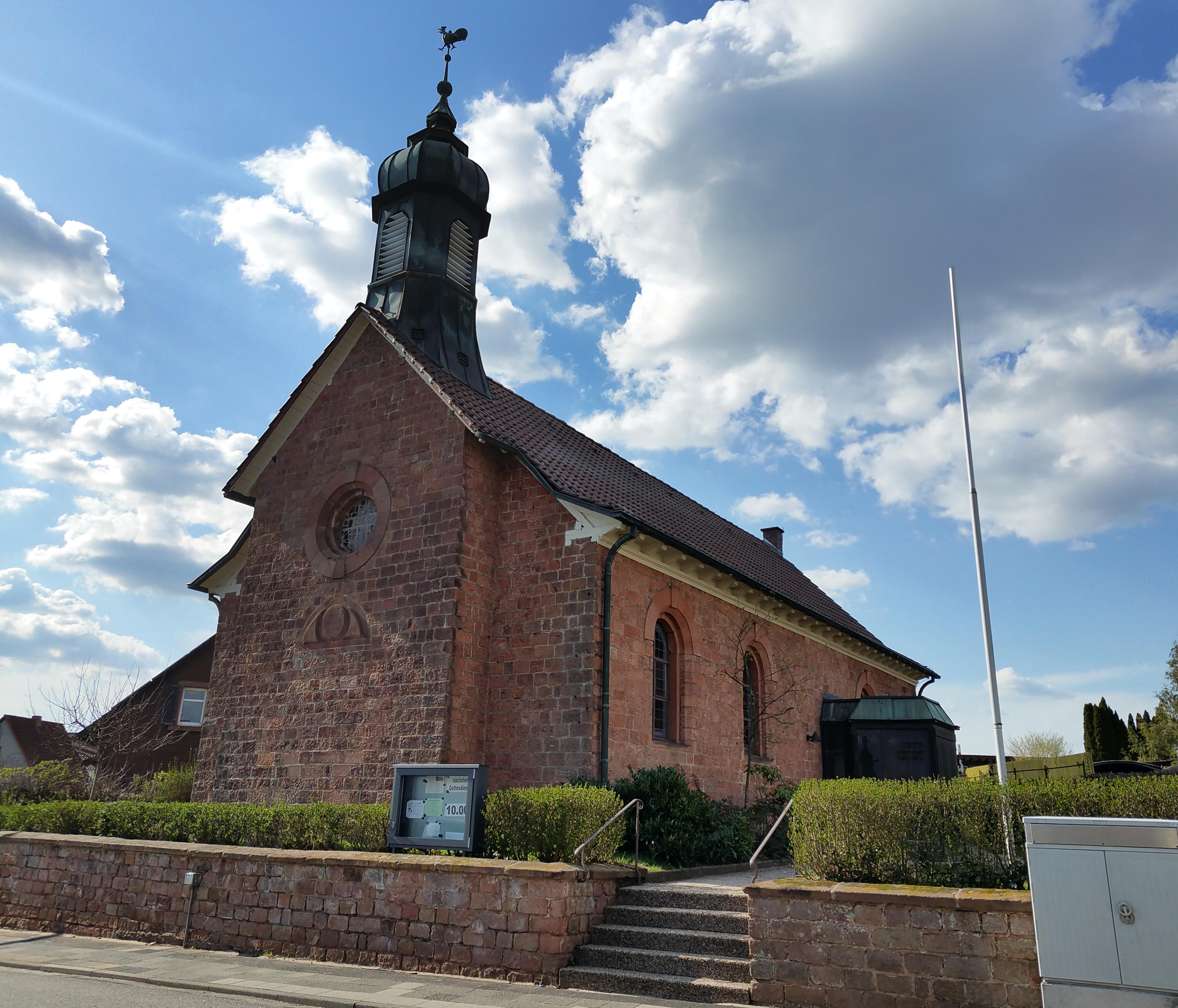
- Evangelical church

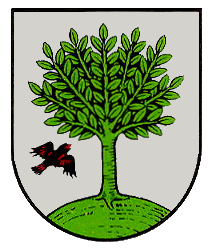
- Coat of arms

- Location of Dansenberg in Germany Dansenberg (Rhineland-Palatinate)
- Coordinates: 49°24′17″N 7°43′41″E
- Country: Germany
- State: Rhineland-Palatinate
- District: Urban district
- Municipality: Kaiserslautern

Government
  - mayor: Franz Rheinheimer

Area
  - Total: 4.92 km^{2} (1.90 sq mi)
- Elevation: 369 m (1,211 ft)

Population (2020)
  - Total: 2,608
  - Density: 207/km^{2} (537/sq mi)
- Postal code: 67661
- Dialling code: 0631
- Website: kaiserslautern.de

Dansenberg (German pronunciation: [ˈdanzn̩ˌbɛʁk]) is a village and a Stadtteil (quarter) of Kaiserslautern in Rhineland-Palatinate, Germany.

== Notable personalities ==
- Zedd, a Russian-German record producer, DJ, multi-instrumentalist and songwriter, grew up here
- Dietmar Schwager, a German football coach and player, lived in Dansenberg until he died in 2018
