= Wölferlinger Weiher =

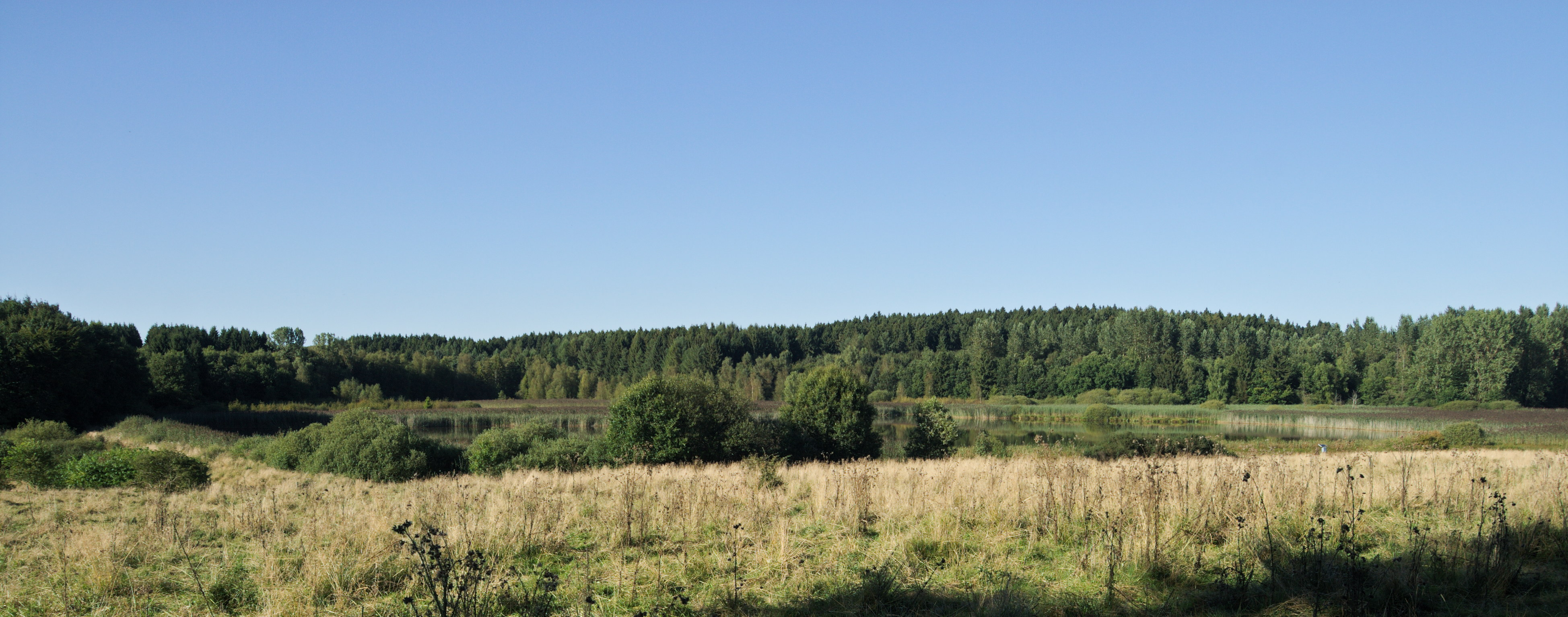
- View from the south looking over the Wölferlinger Weiher

- Location within Germany
- Location: Westerwald Lake District
- Coordinates: 50°34′14″N 7°52′15″E
- Primary outflows: Saynbach
- Surface area: 1 hectare (2.5 acres)
- Surface elevation: 430 kilometres (270 mi)

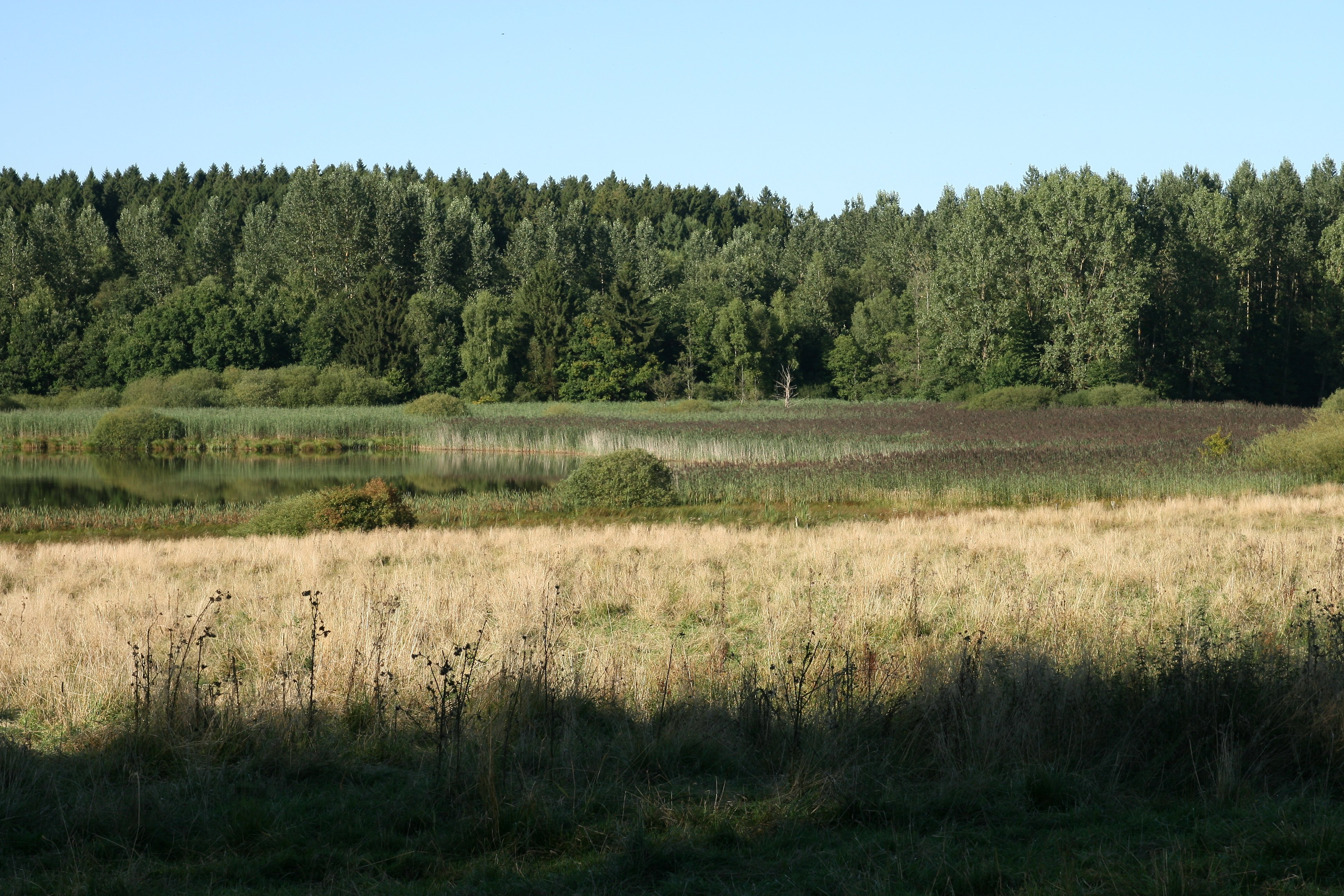
Reeds on the east shore

The Wölferlinger Weiher is a pond in the municipality of Wölferlingen between the village of Wölferlingen itself and Langenhahn in the German county of Westerwaldkreis. In 1979, the Wölferlinger Weiher was designated an official nature reserve. It is on the Seven Weiher Way (7-Weiher-Weg) in the Westerwald region. Laid out along with six other ponds by Count Frederick III of Wied in the 17th century, the Wölferlinger Weiher is part of the protected landscape known as the Westerwald Lake District.

The Wölferlinger Weiher itself has an area of 1.02 hectares and is thus much smaller than the other waterbodies of the Westerwald Lake District. It is home to rare bird and plant species such as Jacob's Ladder and lesser butterfly-orchid. The lake has marshes and shallow water zones along its perimeter. The nature reserve around the pond has an area of about 90 ha.
