= Dreifelder Weiher =

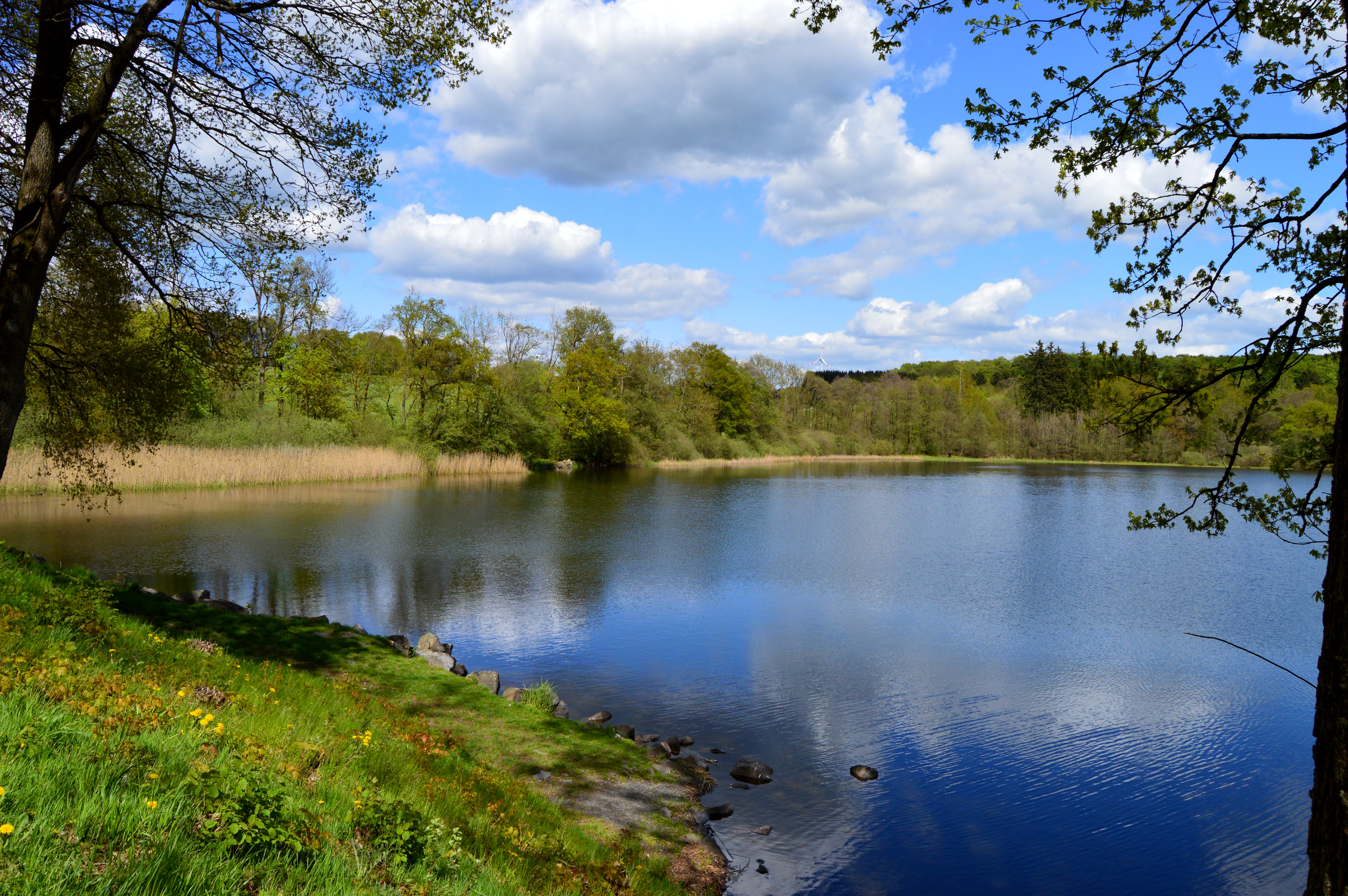
- The Dreifelder Weiher in spring

- Location within Rhineland-Palatinate
- Location: Rhineland-Palatinate
- Coordinates: 50°35′35″N 7°49′30″E
- Type: natural freshwater lake
- Basin countries: Germany
- Max. length: 1.16 miles (1.87 km)
- Max. width: 0.48 miles (0.77 km)
- Surface area: 123 hectares (300 acres)
- Surface elevation: 410 metres (1,350 ft)
- Settlements: Dreifelden on southeast shore

The Dreifelder Weiher (also known as: Seeweiher) is a small lake in the northeastern part of the German federal state of Rhineland-Palatinate, which is part of the low mountain range of the Westerwald. It is one of the seven lakes of the Westerwald Lakes. With an area of 123 hectares, it is the largest pond of the Westerwald Lake District.

The surface of the pond is located 410 metres above sea level.
