= Westerwald Lakes =

Seven ponds in the Westerwald of the Rhineland-Palatinate

Coordinates: 50.5809°N 7.8387°E

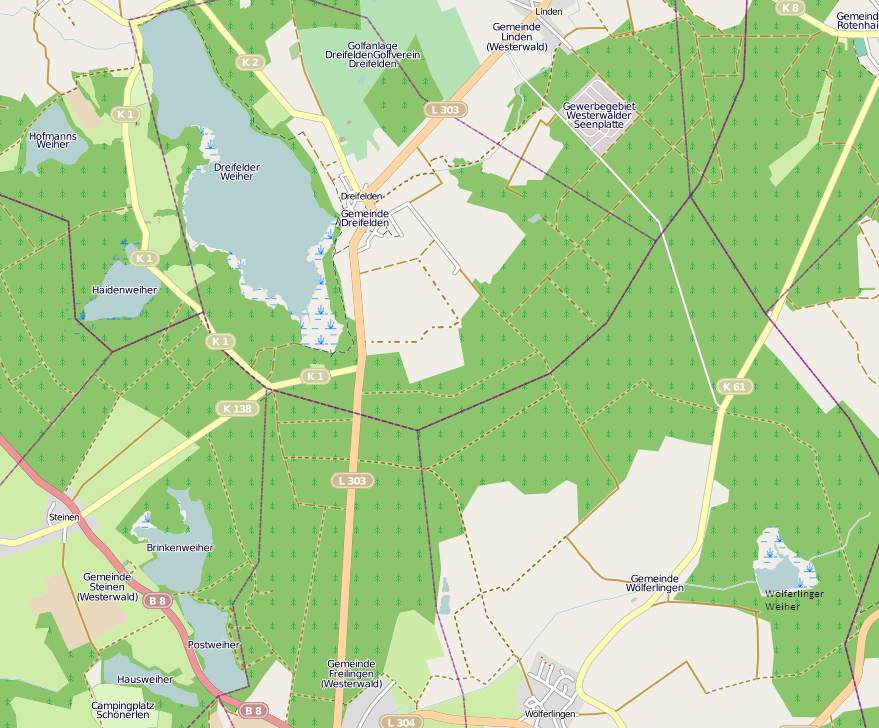
Map of the Westerwald Lake District

The Westerwald Lakes (German: Westerwälder Seen) lie within the eponymous Westerwald Lake District (Westerwälder Seenplatte) in the Westerwald forest within the town quarters of Hachenburg, Westerburg, Montabaur and Dierdorf in the German state of Rhineland-Palatinate. The lakes consist of seven ponds:

- Brinkenweiher
- Haidenweiher
- Hausweiher
- Hoffmannsweiher
- Postweiher
- Dreifelder Weiher (also Seeweiher)
- Wölferlinger Weiher

At 123 hectares, the Dreifelder Weiher is the largest.

Since 2019, the seven ponds and the riparian forests, covering a total area of 228 hectares, have been owned by the NABU National Natural Heritage Foundation.

== History ==
All seven ponds were man-made. The first large fish ponds were created as early as the 12th century by monks for fish farming. In the 17th century, Count Friedrich von Wied had the facilities expanded and created what is now known as the Westerwald Lake District, comprising seven ponds. For centuries, fish farming and the annual fish migration shaped the region. Since 2019, the lakes have been part of the NABU National Natural Heritage Foundation, which works together with the state of Rhineland-Palatinate to protect and preserve this valuable lake landscape.
