= Peter Nedergaard =

Danish professor of political science (born 1957)

- Born: Peter Petersen Nedergaard; 31 October 1957 (age 68)

Academic background
- Education: Institut for Statskundskab, Århus, Denmark
- Thesis: EF og mælken: en analyse af landbrugspolitikkens etablering, udvikling, problemer og tilpasning som baggrund for indførelsen af en mælkekvoteordning i EF (1985)

Academic work
- Institutions: University of Copenhagen
- Main interests: Political science

Peter Nedergaard (born 31 October 1957) is a Danish professor of political science who has been employed at the Department of Political Science at the University of Copenhagen since 2008. Peter Nedergaard is member of the Order of Dannebrog.

== Education and career ==
In 1985 Peter Nedergaard obtained the title of Master of Science in Political Science. He later earned a PhD from the Institut for Statskundskab, Århus, Denmark and an Exam.Art. in Philosophy. In 1983-84, Peter Nedergaard was a Robert Schuman research fellow in the research department of the European Parliament in Luxembourg and a stagiaire in the cabinet of agricultural commissioner, Poul Dalsager, in Brussels.

Peter Nedergaard has previously been affiliated with the Copenhagen Business School as associate professor, assistant professor and finally as professor with special responsibilities. For a few years he left the academic world, instead working as head of unit in the Danish Ministry of Employment during the Danish EU Presidency in 2002. Peter Nedergaard's research covers European policy and European integration with special attention to business policy, internal market policy, climate policy, agricultural policy and employment policy. In 2007, he was a visiting scholar at Stanford University.

== Research and publications ==
Peter Nedergaard's research has been published in international scientific journals such as the Journal of Common Market Studies, Journal of European Public Policy, Public Choice, Journal of European Integration, Scandinavian Political Studies, Cooperation and Conflict and Policy Studies. In addition, he has published a number of textbooks for high schools and universities on inter alia theory of science, European policy and the economics and politics of China, the USA, Germany and the EU.

Alongside his work as a researcher, Peter Nedergaard has been a member of several boards, councils and commissions, including the Mortgage Credit Complaint Board, the Complaint Board of Banking Services, the Suffrage Commission and the committee on liability of financial advisers. In 1992-2009 he was the executive editor of the Danish scientific journal Økonomi & Politik.

Peter Nedergaard is a reviewer for several international research foundations and journals. He is also a prolific columnist and often appears in the media as a political expert and commentator. In 2018, he was ranked as the second-most cited scientist at the University of Copenhagen by Uniavisen.

Peter Nedergaard is initiator to the so-called Erik Rasmussen Prize, which is given to a researcher in Political Science by the Danish Society of Political Science. The Prize is the highest prize within Political Science in Denmark, and it is named after the "founding father" of Political Science in Denmark, Professor Erik Rasmussen, who established the Department of Political Science at University of Aarhus in the beginning of the 1960s.

Peter Nedergaard is also the initiator to the publication of the "Routledge Handbook of the Politics of Brexit", published in 2018 with Professor Ben Rosamond and Associate Professor Patrick Diamond as co-editors. In addition, Peter Nedergaard is the initiator of the preparation of the "Oxford Handbook of Danish Politics", published at Oxford University Press in 2020, which is the most comprehensive international work on Danish politics so far. Professor Peter Munk Christiansen and Professor Jørgen Elklit are co-editors on this publication. In 2022, Peter Nedergaard also published the "Oxford Handbook of Ordoliberalism" at Oxford University Press together with professor Werner Bonefeld and Professor Thomas Biebricher.

== Selected bibliography ==
Books

- Nedergaard, Peter (2007). European Union administration legitimacy and efficiency. Leiden Boston: Nijhoff. ISBN 978-90-04-15573-2.
- Nedergaard, Peter; Campbell, John L. (2008). Institutions and politics: festschrift in honour of Ove K. Pedersen. Copenhagen: DJØF Pub. ISBN 978-87-574-1814-9.
- Nedergaard, Peter (2009). Business and politics in the European Union: cases in services, agriculture, and textiles. Copenhagen: DJØF Pub. ISBN 978-87-574-2083-8.
- Nedergaard, Peter; Grøn, Caroline Howard; Wivel, Anders (2015). The nordic countries and the European Union: still the other European community. London New York: Routledge. ISBN 978-1-138-02424-3.
- Nedergaard, Peter (2009). Business and politics in the European Union: cases in services, agriculture, and textiles. Copenhagen: DJØF Pub. ISBN 978-87-574-2083-8.
- Nedergaard, Peter; Grøn, Caroline Howard; Wivel, Anders (2015). The nordic countries and the European Union: still the other European community. London New York: Routledge. ISBN 978-1-138-02424-3.
- Nedergaard, Peter; Jensen, Mads Dagnis (2017). EU Presidencies between Politics and Administration: The Governmentality of the Polish, Danish and Cypriot Trio Presidency. Abingdon: Routledge. ISBN 978-1-138-91499-5.
- Nedergaard, Peter; Wivel, Anders (2017). The Routledge Handbook of Scandinavian Politics. Abingdon: Routledge. ISBN 978-1-138-90585-6.
- Diamond, Patrick; Nedergaard, Peter; Rosamond, Ben (2018). The Routledge Handbook of the politics of Brexit. Abingdon: Routledge. ISBN 978-1-138-04936-9.

Book chapters

- Nedergaard, Peter (2005), "Mutual Learning Processes of the European Employment Strategy: Theoretical Approaches and Methodologies", in Bredgaard, Thomas; Larsen, Flemming (eds.), Employment Policy from Different Angles, København: Djøf Forlag, pp. 291–316, ISBN 978-87-91690-20-4.
- Nedergaard, Peter (2008), "The Political Economy of European Integration and Business: How to Explain Policy Developments", in Nedergaard, Peter; Campbell, John L. (eds.), Jurist og Økonomforbundet, København: Djøf Forlag, pp. 291–316, ISBN 978-87-574-1814-9.
- Nedergaard, Peter (2008), "Introduction", in Nedergaard, Peter; Campbell, John L. (eds.), Jurist og Økonomforbundet, København: Djøf Forlag, pp. 17–22, ISBN 978-87-574-1814-9.
- Lynggaard, Kennet; Nedergaard, Peter (2010), "The Logic of Policy Development: Lessons Learned from Reform and Routine within the CAP 1980-2003"", in Skogstad, Grace; Verdun, Amy (eds.), The Common Agricultural Policy: Policy Dynamics in a Changing Context, London: Routledge.
- Nedergaard, Peter; Jensen, M.C.D. (2011), "The OMC in Comparative Perspective: Learning and Community Building in the OECD and Nordic Council of Ministers", in Warleigh-Lack, Alex; Robinson, Nick; Rosamund, Ben (eds.), New Regionalism and the European Union. Dialogues, Comparisons and New Research Directions, New York: Routledge, ISBN 978-0-415-56372-7.
- Nedergaard, Peter (2014), "EU coordination processes in Denmark: Change in order to preserve", in Wivel, A.; Miles, L. (eds.), Denmark and the European Union, Abingdon, Oxon: Routledge, pp. 30–46, ISBN 978-0-415-61134-3.
- Nedergaard, Peter (2014), "The Internal Market Policy and the Common Agricultural Policy: the normalization of EU policy-making in Denmark", in Wivel, A.; Miles, L. (eds.), Denmark and the European Union, Abingdon, Oxon: Routledge, pp. 30–46, ISBN 978-0-415-61134-3.
- Nedergaard, Peter; Jensen, Mads Dagnis (2014), "Representation. Who is Sitting in the EU's Chair at the UN? Member States, Presidencies and the Commission", in Orsini, Amandine (ed.), The European Union with(in) International Organisations. Farnham, Surrey: Ashgate, pp. 55–71, ISBN 978-1-4724-2414-3.
- Nedergaard, Peter; Jensen, M.C.D. (2015), "Still the 'Other' European Community? The Nordic Countries and the European Union", in Nedergaard, Peter; Grøn, Caroline; Wivel, Anders (eds.), The Nordic Countries and the European Union: Still the other European community?, New York: Routledge, ISBN 978-1-138-02424-3.
- Nedergaard, Peter; Jensen, M.C.D. (2015), "Mr. Svensson Goes to Brussels: Concluding on the Nordic Countries and the European Union", in Nedergaard, Peter; Grøn, Caroline; Wivel, Anders (eds.), The Nordic Countries and the European Union: Still the other European community?, New York: Routledge, ISBN 978-1-138-02424-3.
- Nedergaard, Peter; Jensen, M.C.D. (2015), "Market integration in Europe and the Nordic Countries: the ambivalent path dependency", in Nedergaard, Peter; Grøn, Caroline; Wivel, Anders (eds.), The Nordic Countries and the European Union: Still the other European community?, New York: Routledge, ISBN 978-1-138-02424-3.
- Nedergaard, Peter; Jensen, M.C.D. (2015), "The Common Agricultural Policy: Comparing Danish and Swedish governmental positions", in Nedergaard, Peter; Grøn, Caroline; Wivel, Anders (eds.), The Nordic Countries and the European Union: Still the other European community?, New York: Routledge, ISBN 978-1-138-02424-3.
- Nedergaard, Peter; Wivel, Anders (2017), "Introduction: Scandinavian politics between myth and reality", in Nedergaard, Peter; Wivel, Anders (eds.), The Routledge Handbook of Scandinavian Politics, Abingdon: Routledge, ISBN 978-1-138-90585-6.
- Nedergaard, Peter; Wivel, Anders (2017), "Conclusions: Scandinavian polities, politics and policies", in Nedergaard, Peter; Wivel, Anders (eds.), The Routledge Handbook of Scandinavian Politics, Abingdon: Routledge, ISBN 978-1-138-90585-6.
- Diamond, Patrick; Nedergaard, Peter; Rosamond, Ben (2018), "Introduction", in Diamond, Patrick; Nedergaard, Peter; Rosamond, Ben (eds.), The Routledge Handbook of the politics of Brexit, Abingdon: Routledge, ISBN 978-1-138-04936-9.
- Nedergaard, Peter (2018), "The influence of ordoliberalism in the European integration processes, with the Eurozone crisis as a case", in Alcouffe, Alain; Baslé, Maurice; Poettinger, Monika (eds.), Macroeconomic Theory and the Eurozone Crisis, Abingdon: Routledge, ISBN 978-0-8153-6404-7.

Journal articles

- Nedergaard, Peter (June 2006). "Market failures and government failures: a theoretical model of the Common Agricultural Policy" (PDF). Public Choice. 127 (3–4): 393–413. doi:10.1007/s11127-005-9000-1. JSTOR 30026596. S2CID 59270980.
- Nedergaard, Peter (July 2006). "The 2003 reform of the Common Agricultural Policy: against all odds or rational explanations?" (PDF). Journal of European Integration. 28 (3): 203–223. doi:10.1080/07036330600785749. S2CID 154437960.
- Nedergaard, Peter (December 2006). "Which countries learn from which? A comparative analysis of the direction of mutual learning processes within the open method of coordination committees of the European Union and among the Nordic countries". Cooperation and Conflict. 41 (4): 422–442. doi:10.1177/0010836706069870. S2CID 55745756.
- Nedergaard, Peter (June 2008). "The reform of the 2003 Common Agricultural Policy: an advocacy coalition explanation". Policy Studies. 29 (2): 179–195. doi:10.1080/01442870802033464. S2CID 154438310.
- Nedergaard, Peter (July 2008). "Coordination processes in international organisations: the EU at the International Labour Conference in 2005". European Integration Online Papers. 12 (2008–003). doi:10.1695/2008003. Pdf.
- Nedergaard, Peter (2009). "The political economy of the Clean Development Mechanism (CDM) governance system" (PDF). IOP Conference Series: Earth and Environmental Science. 6 (22) 222013. doi:10.1088/1755-1307/6/2/222013. Pdf.
- Nedergaard, Peter (January 2009). "Policy learning processes in international committees" (PDF). Public Management Review. 11 (1): 23–37. doi:10.1080/14719030802490011. S2CID 154949667.
- Nedergaard, Peter (March 2009). "European Union import quotas on Chinese textile and clothing exports in 2005: a panic-driven commission or rational explanations?". Journal of Industry, Competition and Trade. 9 (1): 17–47. doi:10.1007/s10842-008-0031-4. S2CID 153602227.
- Nedergaard, Peter (December 2009). "There are coalitions everywhere" (PDF). European Societies. 11 (5): 649–671. doi:10.1080/14616690802326418. S2CID 153452334.
- Nedergaard, Peter; Duina, Francesco (August 2010). "Learning in international governmental organizations: the case of social protection" (PDF). Global Social Policy. 10 (2): 193–217. doi:10.1177/1468018110366617. S2CID 144435350.
- Nedergaard, Peter; Jensen, Mads Dagnis (August 2012). "From 'Frankenstein' to 'toothless vampire'? Explaining the watering down of the Services Directive". Journal of European Public Policy. 19 (6): 844–862. doi:10.1080/13501763.2011.610692. S2CID 145180308. Pdf.
- Nedergaard, Peter; Jensen, Mads Dagnis (March 2014). "The anatomy of Intergroups – network governance in the political engine room of the European Parliament" (PDF). Policy Studies. 35 (2): 195–209. doi:10.1080/01442872.2013.875146. S2CID 154897558.
- Wettendorf, Rikke; Nedergaard, Peter; Blom-Hansen, Jens (March 2014). "Lobbying in the EU Comitology System" (PDF). Journal of European Integration. 36 (5): 491–507. doi:10.1080/07036337.2014.889128. S2CID 153672760.
- Nedergaard, Peter; Jensen, Mads Dagnis (September 2014). "Uno, duo, trio? Varieties of trio presidencies in the Council of Ministers". Journal of Common Market Studies. 52 (5): 1035–1052. doi:10.1111/jcms.12130. S2CID 154961315.
- Nedergaard, Peter; Bang, Henrik; Jensen, Mads Dagnis (March 2015). "'We the People' versus 'We the Heads of States': the debate on the democratic deficit of the European Union" (PDF). Policy Studies. 36 (2): 196–216. doi:10.1080/01442872.2014.1000846. S2CID 154326073.
- Nedergaard, Peter; Snaith, Holly (September 2015). "'As I drifted on a river I could not control': the unintended ordoliberal consequences of the Eurozone crisis". Journal of Common Market Studies. 53 (5): 1094–1109. doi:10.1111/jcms.12249. S2CID 143248038.
- Nedergaard, Peter; Jensen, Mads Dagnis (March 2017). "You're gonna have to serve somebody: A comparative analysis of the Polish, Danish and Cypriot EU Presidency discourses" (PDF). Comparative European Politics. 15 (2): 286–309. doi:10.1057/cep.2015.18. S2CID 146243215.
- Jensen, Mads Dagnis; Jopp, Mathias; Nedergaard, Peter (2016). "Coordination of EU Policy Positions in Germany and Denmark: A Politics of Institutional Choice Approach". Journal of Contemporary European Research. 12 (2): 634–652. doi:10.30950/jcer.v12i2.639. ISSN 1815-347X. S2CID 96444515.
- Suenson, Emil Lobe; Nedergaard, Peter; Christiansen, Peter Munk (February 2016). "Why Lash Yourself to the Mast? The Case of the Danish "Budget Law"" (PDF). Public Budgeting & Finance. 36 (1): 3–21. doi:10.1111/pbaf.12077. S2CID 155982756.
- Nedergaard, Peter; Henriksen, Maja Friis (May 2018). "Britisk exceptionalisme: Hvordan Brexit kan forstås i et historisk lys". Økonomi & Politik. 91 (2): 66–78.
- Nedergaard, Peter (September 2018). "An Ordoliberal Theory of the States". German Politics.
- Nedergaard, Peter (October 2018). "Borders and the EU legitimacy problem: the 2015–16 European Refugee Crisis". Policy Studies.
- Nedergaard, Peter (September 2018). "An Ordoliberal Theory of the States". German Politics.
