= Frank Schimmelfennig =

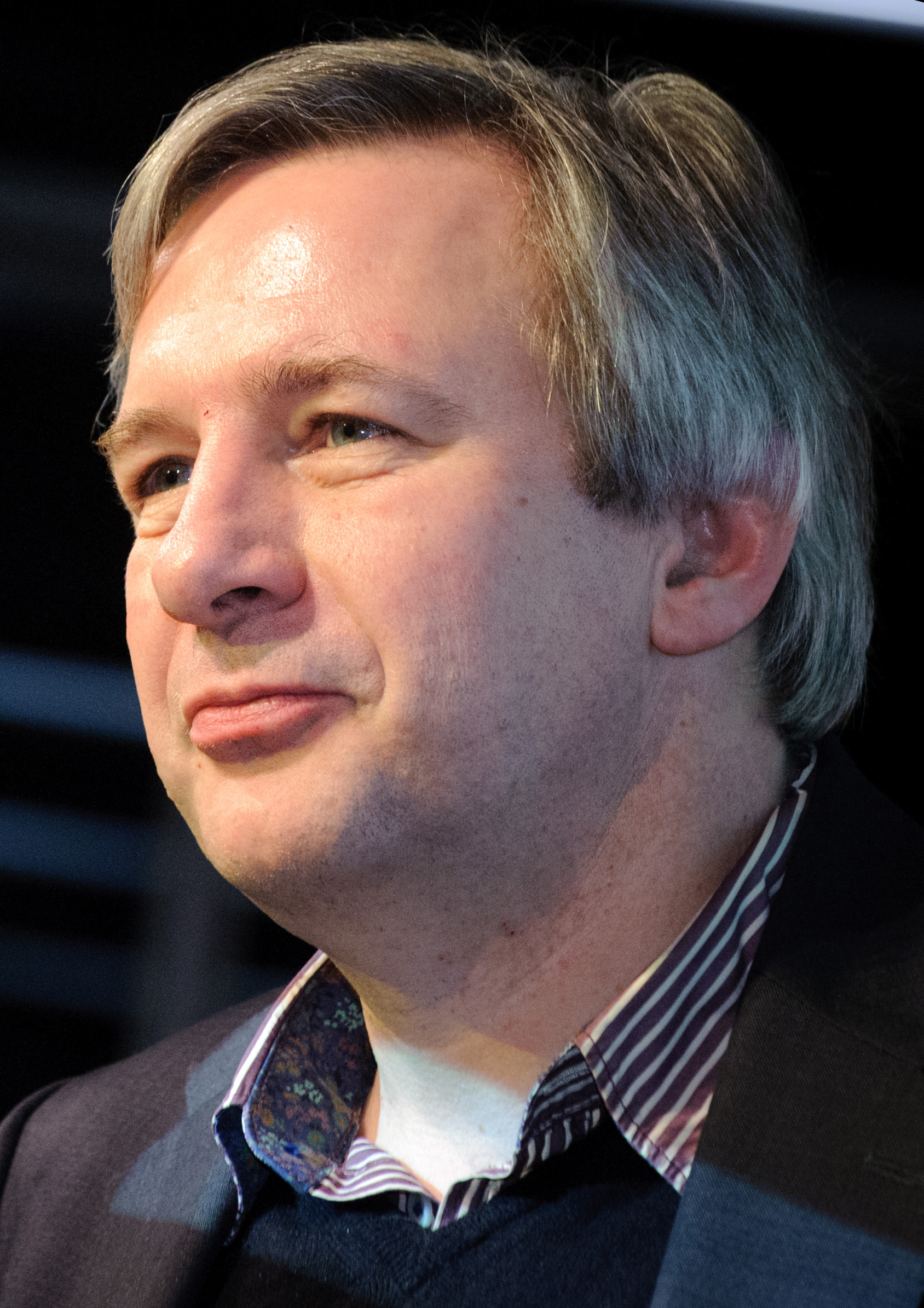
Frank Schimmelfennig (2012)

Frank Schimmelfennig (born 1963 in Bad Marienberg, Rhineland-Palatinate) is a professor of European politics at the Center for Comparative and International Studies at the Swiss Federal Institute of Technology in Zurich, Switzerland.

== Academic career ==
Frank Schimmelfennig obtained his PhD in political science from the University of Tübingen, Germany in 1995, during which time he was employed as a research fellow at the Institute of Political Science. During his studies, Schimmelfennig had research stays in Dijon, France and at Tufts University in Medford, Massachusetts.

Upon completion of his doctorate, he served as an Assistant Professor of International Politics in Tübingen from 1995-1997. This period was followed by visiting professorships in political science and/or European politics at the University of Konstanz (1997–1998), Heinrich Heine University Düsseldorf (2001), LMU Munich (2003–2004) and the Institute of Advanced Studies in Vienna, Austria (November 2004).

Schimmelfennig also held post-doctorate fellowships at the Technische Universität Darmstadt (1998–2002), the European University Institute (2001–2002), and the Mannheim Center for European Social Research (2002–2005).

Since September 2005, Schimmelfennig has been Professor and Chair of the Center for European Politics at the Swiss Federal Institute of Technology in Zurich, Switzerland.

== Professional service ==
Frank Schimmelfennig is a member of the executive committees of the European Union Studies Association and of the German Political Science Association. His professional affiliations also include the European Community Studies Association Switzerland, the European Consortium for Political Research and the American Political Science Association.

He is a member of the editorial advisory boards for Cooperation and Conflict, Journal of European Public Policy, and the Journal of International Relations and Development.

== Research interests and recent works ==
Frank Schimmelfennig's research interests are in the theory of international institutions and European integration and, more specifically, in the enlargement and democratization of European regional organizations. His highest cited papers are Introduction according to Google Scholar.

He has published, inter alia, in Comparative Political Studies, European Journal of International Relations, International Organization, Journal of Common Market Studies, Journal of European Public Policy, and Zeitschrift für Internationale Beziehungen. His book, The EU, NATO and the Integration of Europe: Rules and Rhetoric received the Best Book Award of the European Union Studies Association for 2003 and 2004.

His recent publications include:

- Die Europäische Union auf dem Weg in den Verfassungsstaat (2006)
- International Socialization in Europe: European Organizations, Political Conditionality and Democratic Change (Palgrave, 2006)
- The Politics of European Union Enlargement: Theoretical Approaches (Routledge, 2005)
- The Europeanization of Central and Eastern Europe (Cornell University Press, 2005)
- Die Europäische Union: Theorien und Analysenkonzepte (2005)
- The EU, NATO and the Integration of Europe: Rules and Rhetoric (Cambridge University Press, 2003)
