= Fuchskaute =

Mountain in Rhineland-Palatinate, Germany

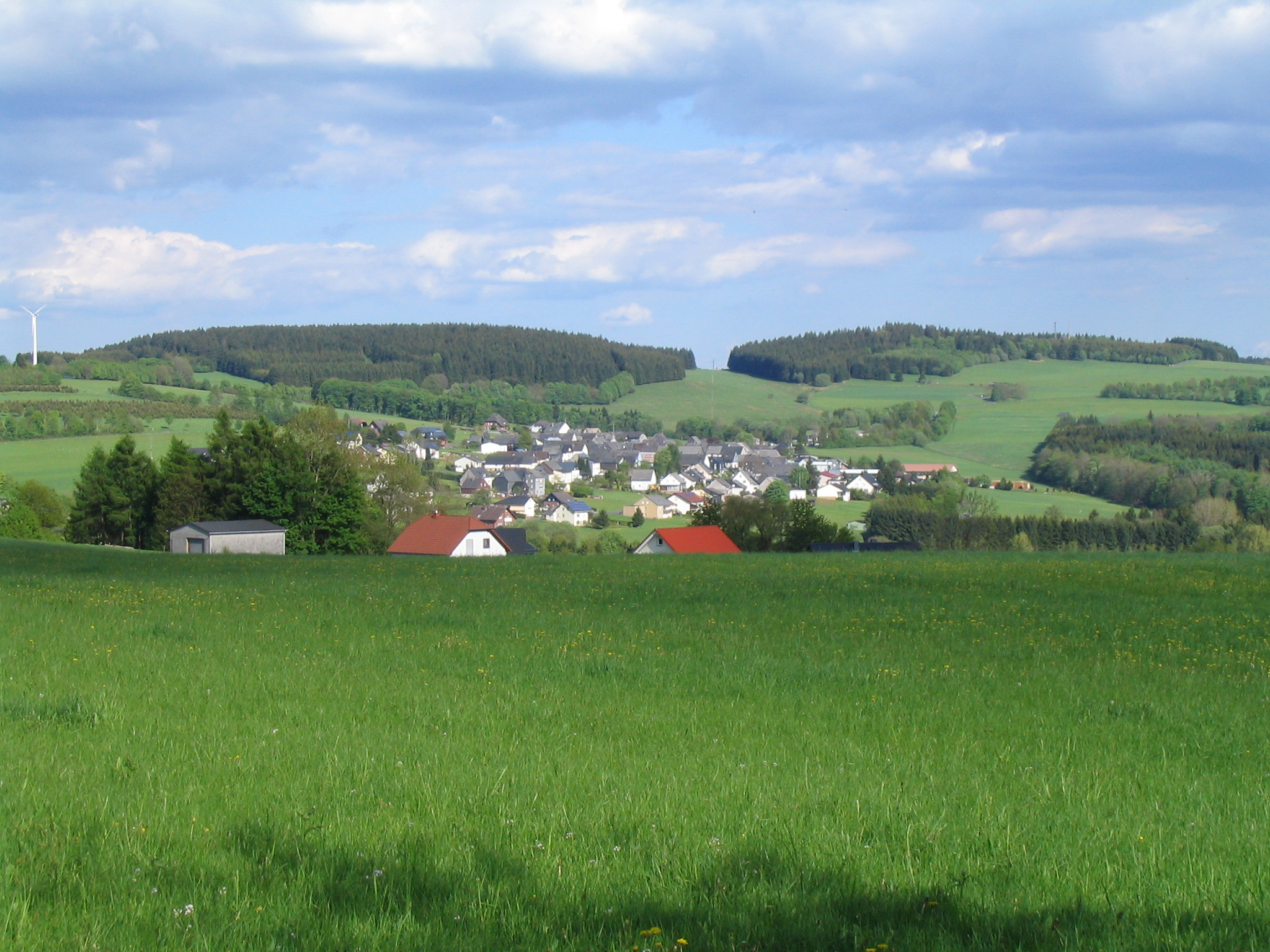
- The Fuchskaute from the west with its north (left) and south (right) tops; Foreground: the houses of Bretthausen, behind: Willingen

Highest point
- Elevation: 657.3 m above sea level (NHN) (2,156 ft)
- Prominence: 222 m ↓ AS Haiger/Burbach (A 45)
- Isolation: 27.7 km → Jagdberg (Rothaar Mountains)
- Listing: highest mountain in the Westerwald
- Coordinates: 50°39′34″N 8°06′09″E

Geography
- Location within Rhineland-Palatinate
- Location: Westerwaldkreis, Rhineland-Palatinate,
- Parent range: Hoher Westerwald, Westerwald, Germany

Geology
- Mountain type: Extinct volcano
- Rock type: Basalt

The Fuchskaute is an extinct volcano and, at 657.3 m above sea level (NHN), the highest mountain of the Westerwald and the county of Westerwaldkreis in the German state of Rhineland-Palatinate.

The name Fuchskaute ("foxhole") refers to a place where the fox (Fuchs) had its den (Kaute).

== Geography ==
=== Location ===
The Fuchskaute rises in the High Westerwald, a plateau of the Westerwald which, in turn, is part of the Rhenish Massif. It is about halfway between Bad Marienberg in the west and Breitscheid in the east and lies in the parish of Willingen. The state boundary with Hesse runs along its eastern slopes and that with North Rhine-Westphalia lies a few kilometres to the north. Just under 3 km north-northeast is the tripoint of the states of Hesse, North Rhine-Westphalia and Rhineland-Palatinate. Several streams rise on its flanks, including the Nister (Große Nister).

== Towers ==
There used to be an observation tower on the Fuchskaute from where views of the Westerwald and other local countryside could be enjoyed.

Amateur radio services formerly operated two transmission towers on the south top of the Fuchskaute. These operations ceased in early 2021.

== See also ==
- List of volcanoes in Germany
