= Nistertal-Bad Marienberg station =

Railway station in Nistertal, Germany

Nistertal-Bad Marienberg
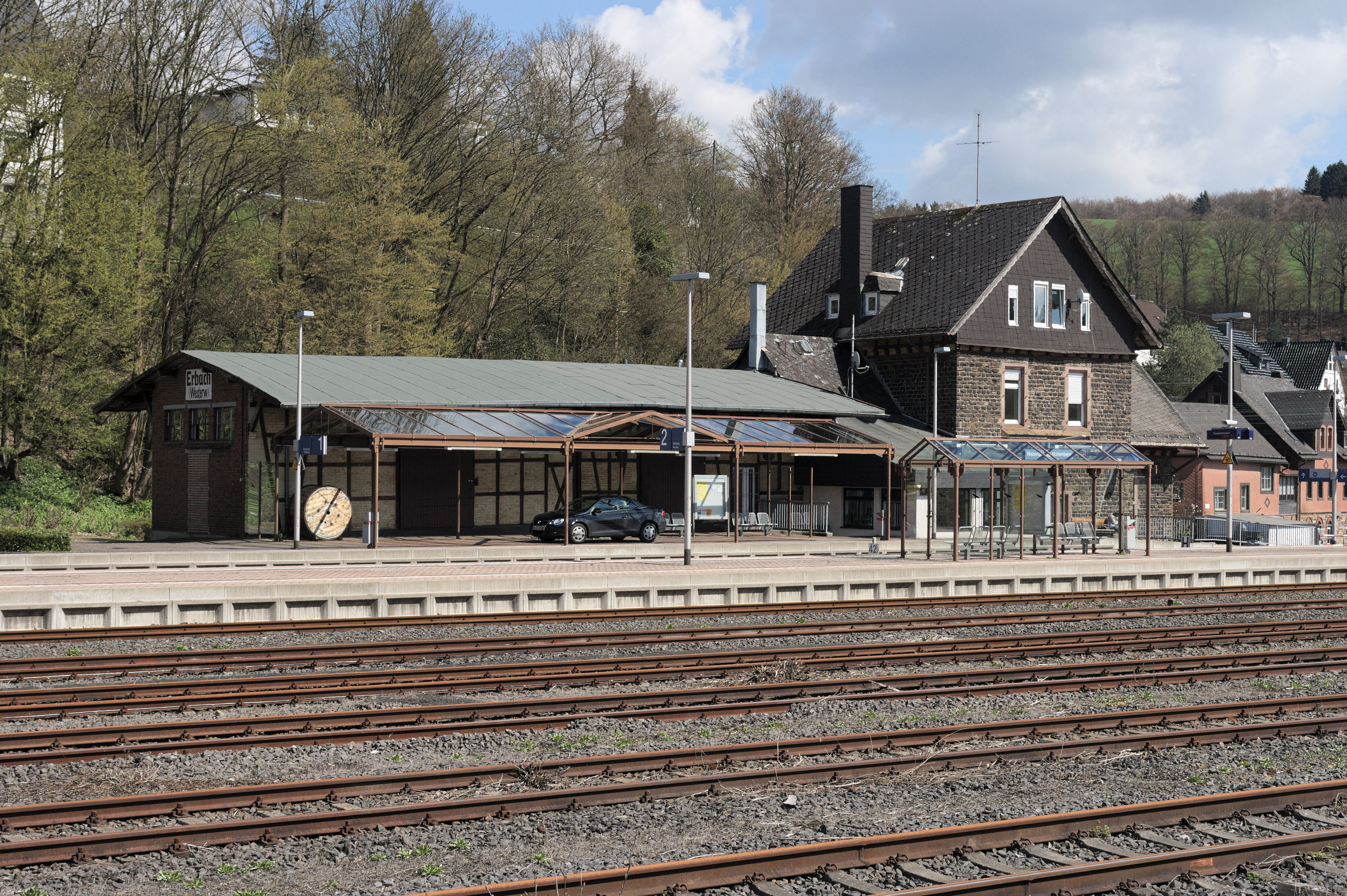

General information
- Location: Bahnhofstr. 2, Nistertal, Rhineland-Palatinate; Germany
- Coordinates: 50°37′57″N 7°54′02″E
- Lines: Limburg–Altenkirchen (km 42.4) (KBS 461); Erbach–Fehl-Ritzhausen (km 0.0, closed)
- Platforms: 3

Construction
- Accessible: Yes

Other information
- Station code: 1620
- DS100 code: FERW
- IBNR: 8001819
- Category: 6
- Fare zone: VRM: 447
- Website: www.bahnhof.de

History
- Opened: 1 October 1886
- Former names: Erbach

Services
Preceding station	Hessische Landesbahn	Following station
Unnau/Korb towards Siegen Hbf	RB 90	Büdingen towards Limburg (Lahn)
Location

Nistertal-Bad Marienberg station (formerly: Erbach) is, along with Büdingen (Westerw) station, one of two rail stations in the municipality of Nistertal in the Westerwald and the German state of Rhineland-Palatinate. The station is located at line-kilometre 42.4 on the Limburg (Lahn)–Altenkirchen (Westerw)–Au (Sieg) railway (also known as the Oberwesterwaldbahn or Upper Westerwald Railway). From 1911 to 1971, the Erbach–Fehl-Ritzhausen railway branched off the Upper Westerwald Railway here. It is located in the area of Verkehrsverbund Rhein-Mosel (VRM), zone 447.

== Name ==
The station was originally called Erbach (Westerw), since it was in the Nistertal district of Erbach. From 1911 to 1971, Marienberg-Langenbach station was located a few kilometres southwest of the centre of the town of Marienberg. With the decommissioning of the Erbach–Fehl-Ritzhausen railway, Erbach station became the closest station to Bad Marienberg and so it was renamed Nistertal/Bad Marienberg to reflect the fact that it now serves both municipalities.

== History ==
Nistertal-Bad Marienberg station was opened with the Hachenburg–Hadamar section of the Upper Westerwald Railway on 1 October 1886 under the name of Erbach (Westerw).

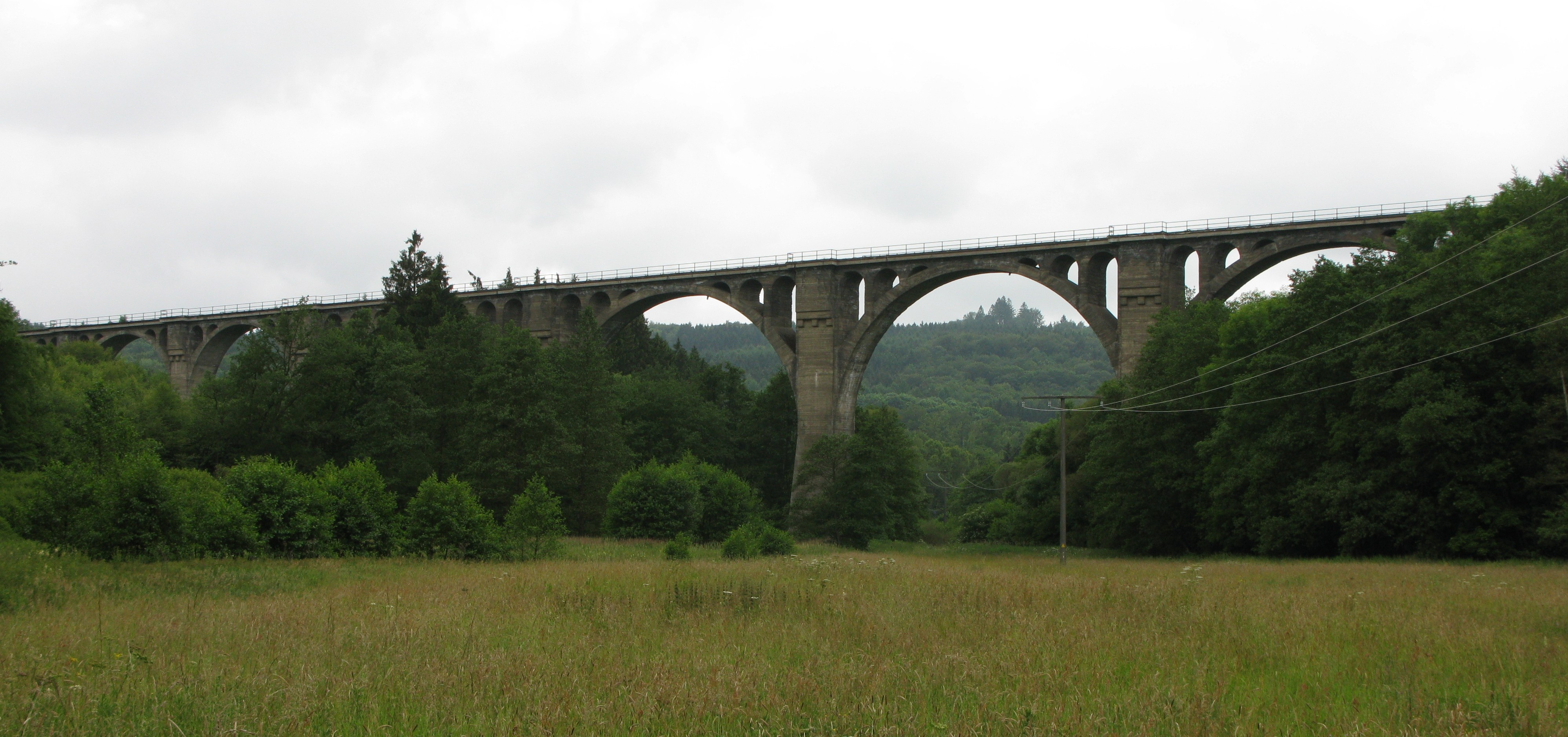
Erbach bridge over the Nister near Erbach station

The Erbach–Fehl-Ritzhausen railway was somewhat difficult to build due to the unsuitable subsurface near Erbach. The line had to be built on the western slope of the Nister. In addition to the crossing of the Upper Westerwald Railway near Erbach station, an eleven-arched concrete viaduct, which, at about 300 metres long and almost 40 metres high, was the largest of its kind in the German Empire at the time, was built over the Nister in only six months. It was built without steel reinforcement and was considered a "miracle of technology“. The railway line was finally opened on 31 August 1911.

Passenger services over the whole Erbach–Fehl-Ritzhausen railway, and freight traffic between Marienberg and Fehl-Ritzhausen, were discontinued on 26 September 1971. The remainder of the section, which was still used for freight traffic until the end of 1994, even if only occasionally, was closed down on 1 July 1996.

After the closure of the Erbach–Fehl-Ritzhausen railway in 1971, the Erbach Bridge was preserved as a heritage-listed technical structure.

== Entrance building ==
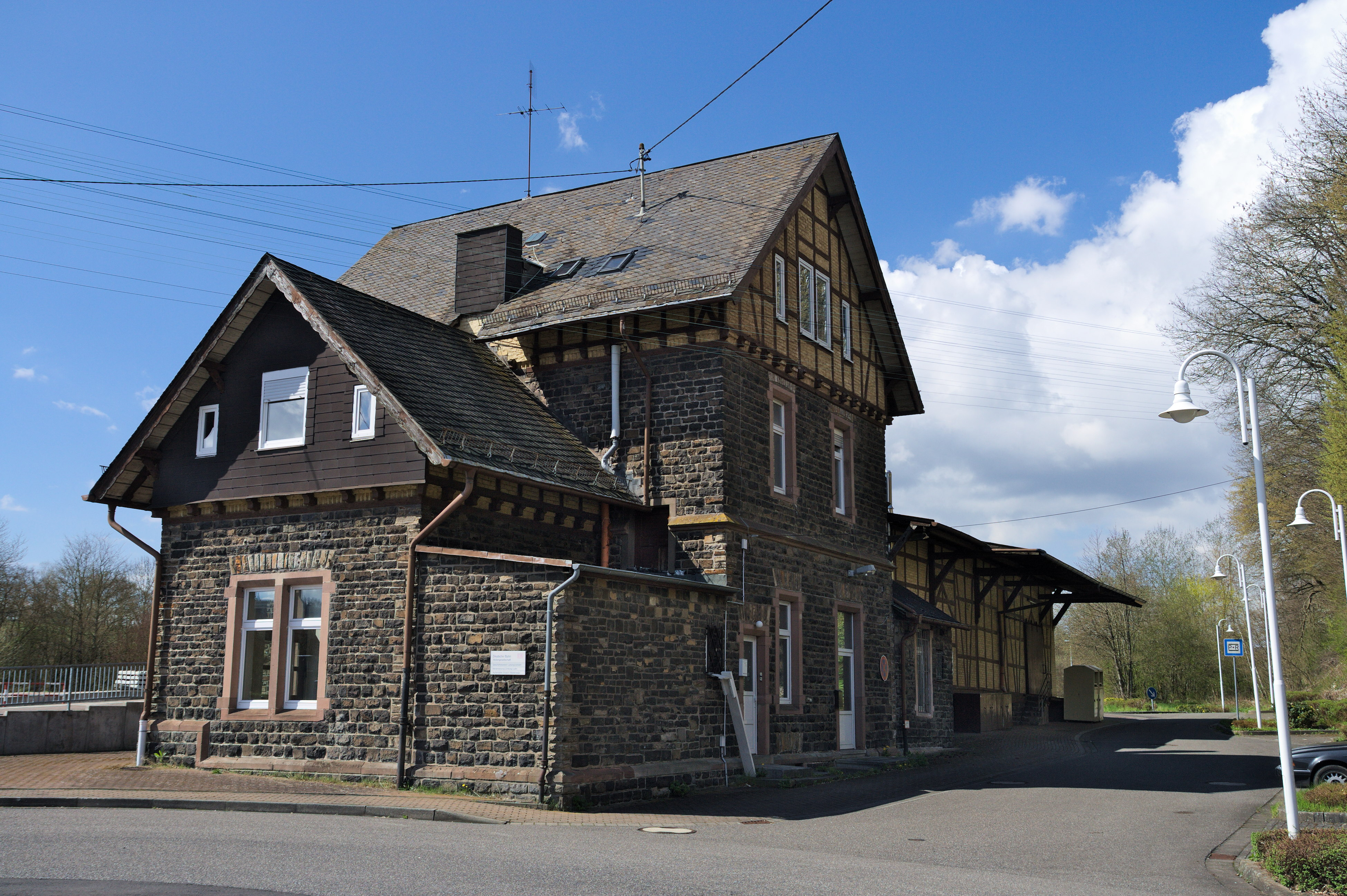
Southeast side of the station building

The entrance building of Nistertal-Bad Marienberg station, including an attached freight shed, was built to a standard design in around 1885. The station is located at Bahnhofstraße 2. The entrance building of Nistertal-Bad Marienberg station is a listed as a cultural monument under the Rhineland Palatinate Monument Protection Act (Denkmalschutzgesetz).

== Infrastructure ==
Nistertal-Bad Marienberg station still has extensive railway facilities, which were formerly used for freight operations and have not been dismantled. Three tracks are available for passenger operations at a platform next to the station building and at an island platform.

The numbering of the platforms begins on the southwest side of the station building.

- Track 1 is a through track and is located next to the station building. This is used by HLB trains operating as the Westerwald-Sieg-Bahn (RB 90) towards Limburg (Lahn) via Westerburg.
- Track 2 is also a through track and shares an island platform with track 4. It is used by services on line RB 90 towards Siegen via Altenkirchen (Westerw) and Au (Sieg).
- Track 4 is a through track and is located as the outermost platform next to platform track 2. It is used by services towards Altenkirchen/Au (Sieg).
- Next to track 4 is an extensive layout of tracks, which was used primarily for freight traffic and today is partly overgrown, but is still partly usable.
- A Bike and ride and a Park and ride facility are located at the station.

== Operations ==
Nistertal-Bad Marienberg station is served only by local services. It lies on the Westerwald-Sieg-railway (Siegen Hbf - Kirchen - Wissen - Au (Sieg) - Altenkirchen (Westerwald) - Hachenburg - Westerburg - Diez Ost - Limburg (Lahn)), which was operated between December 2004 and December 2014 by vectus Verkehrsgesellschaft and since December 2014 by DreiLänderBahn, a subsidiary of Hessische Landesbahn. Each day, the line is served by hourly RB 90 (Westerwald-Sieg-Bahn) services under the Rhineland-Palatinate regular-interval integrated timetable on behalf of Zweckverband SPNV Nord (northern Rhineland-Palatinate rail transport association). Additional services run on the Betzdorf–Altenkirchen section from Monday to Friday during the peak hour meaning that there are services at 30-minute intervals.

The line was served from 1998 by older, refurbished Stadler GTW 2/6 railcars and since 2006 by newer Coradia LINT 27 (class 640) and two-part LINT 41 (class 648) railcars manufactured by Alstom LHB.

== Service ==
=== Train service ===
The line was re-tendered in September 2011 as part of the Eifel-Westerwald-Sieg diesel network. In the course of this call for tenders, the Oberwesterwaldbahn service (RB 28) was renamed the Westerwald-Sieg-Bahn (RB 90) from the December 2014 timetable change and its route was extended from Au (Sieg) to Siegen. In the 2026 timetable, the following service stops at the station:

Line	Route	Interval
RB 90	Siegen Hbf – Betzdorf – Wissen (Sieg) – Au (Sieg) – Altenkirchen (Westerw) – Hachenburg – Nistertal-Bad Marienberg – Westerburg – Dornburg – Hadamar – Elz – Staffel – Diez Ost – Limburg (Lahn)	Hourly

=== Local bus services ===
449	Bad Marienberg – Zinhain – Hardt – Unnau – Erbach / Bf Nistertal - Bad Marienberg – Büdingen – Korb – Hachenburg

The line 449 has the stop "Erbach / Bf Nistertal - Bad Marienberg"

The lines 962 and 967 have a stop close to the station as well.
