= Bimber =

Bimber may refer to:

- Bimber (moonshine), a class of Polish alcoholic beverages
- Bimber, New South Wales, a locality in Finch County, Australia
- Bruce Bimber, social scientist who introduced the idea of accelerated pluralism
- Oliver Bimber, German computer scientist

== See also ==
- Bhimber, a town in Azad Kashmir, Pakistan
