= Bacher Lay =

Coordinates: 50°39′13.7″N 7°58′35.5″E

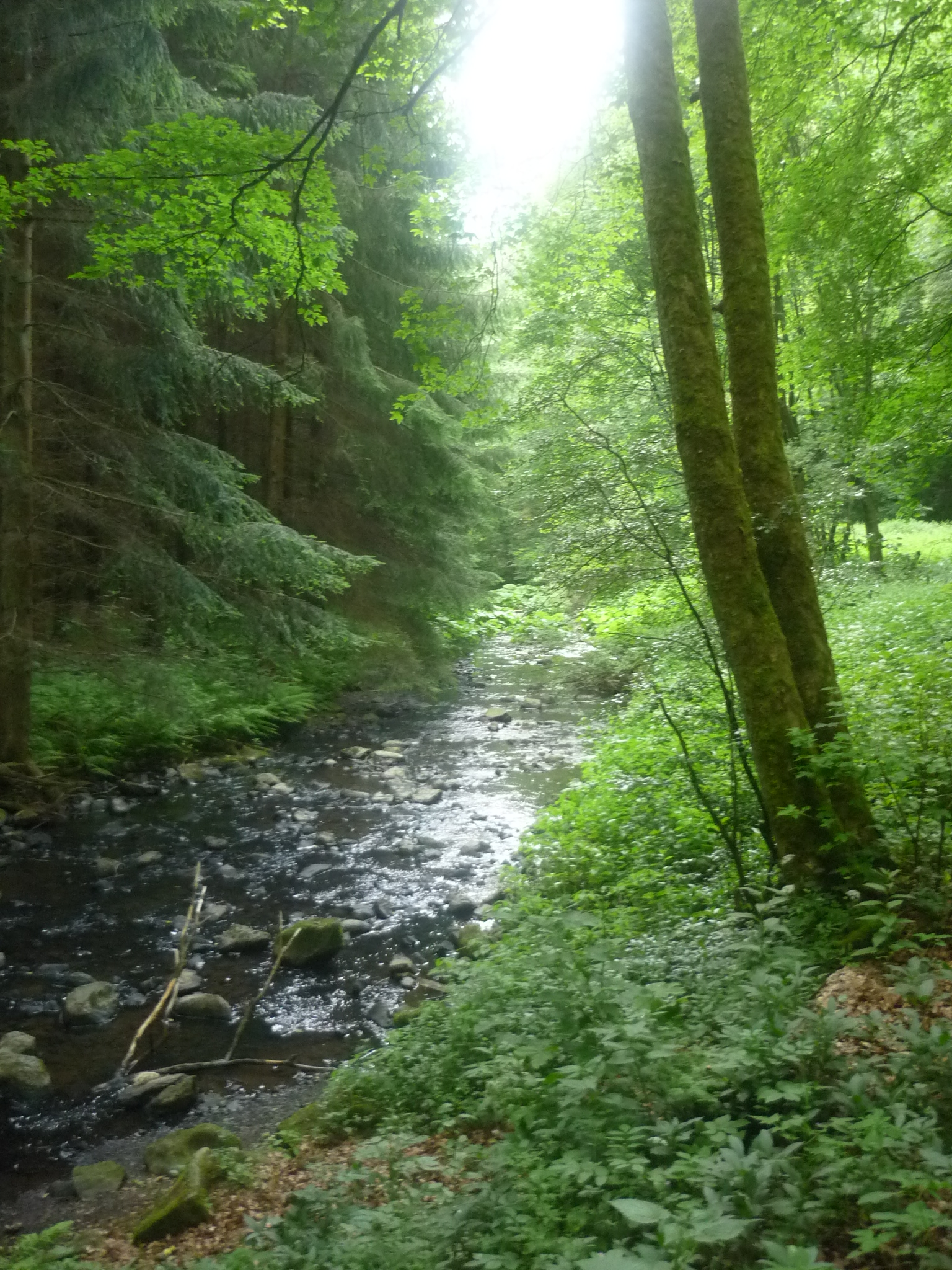
The Bacher Lay near Bad Marienberg (Westerwald)

The Bacher Lay is a nature reserve in Germany, which covers an area of 44.7 hectares in the county of Westerwaldkreis in the German state of Rhineland-Palatinate. It is a geotope of the Westerwald-Lahn-Taunus Geopark

== Location ==
The Bacher Lay is a disused basalt quarry, which is situated between Bad Marienberg and Nisterau on the Black Nister, a tributary of the Great Nister. Its name is derived from the formerly independent hamlet of Bach, now part of the municipality of Nisterau; "lay" in this instance means 'quarry'. The area lies within parts of the parishes (Gemarkungen) of Bad Marienberg, Bach, Eichenstruth and Stockhausen-Illfurth.

The Bacher Lay is characterised by a mighty, almost vertical, basalt rock face, which was produced as a result of basalt quarrying. The nearby "Pfaffenmal", an 18-metre-high columnar basalt cone which looks like a charcoal burner's pile, is also worth seeing.

From the town centre of Bad Marienberg to the Bacher Lay it is about 4 kilometres on foot.

== Nature reserve ==
The Bezirksregierung Koblenz passed a legal ordinance on 28 October 1996, in which the conservation aim is described as follows:

"The conservation aim is the preservation and development of the 'Bacher Lay' with its standing and flowing bodies of water with gentle and steep shore areas, with its dry grassland, tall herbaceous vegetation and basalt rock faces as a habitat for rare, endangered animal and plant species – especially amphibians, reptiles and birds, as well as orchids".

== Gallery ==
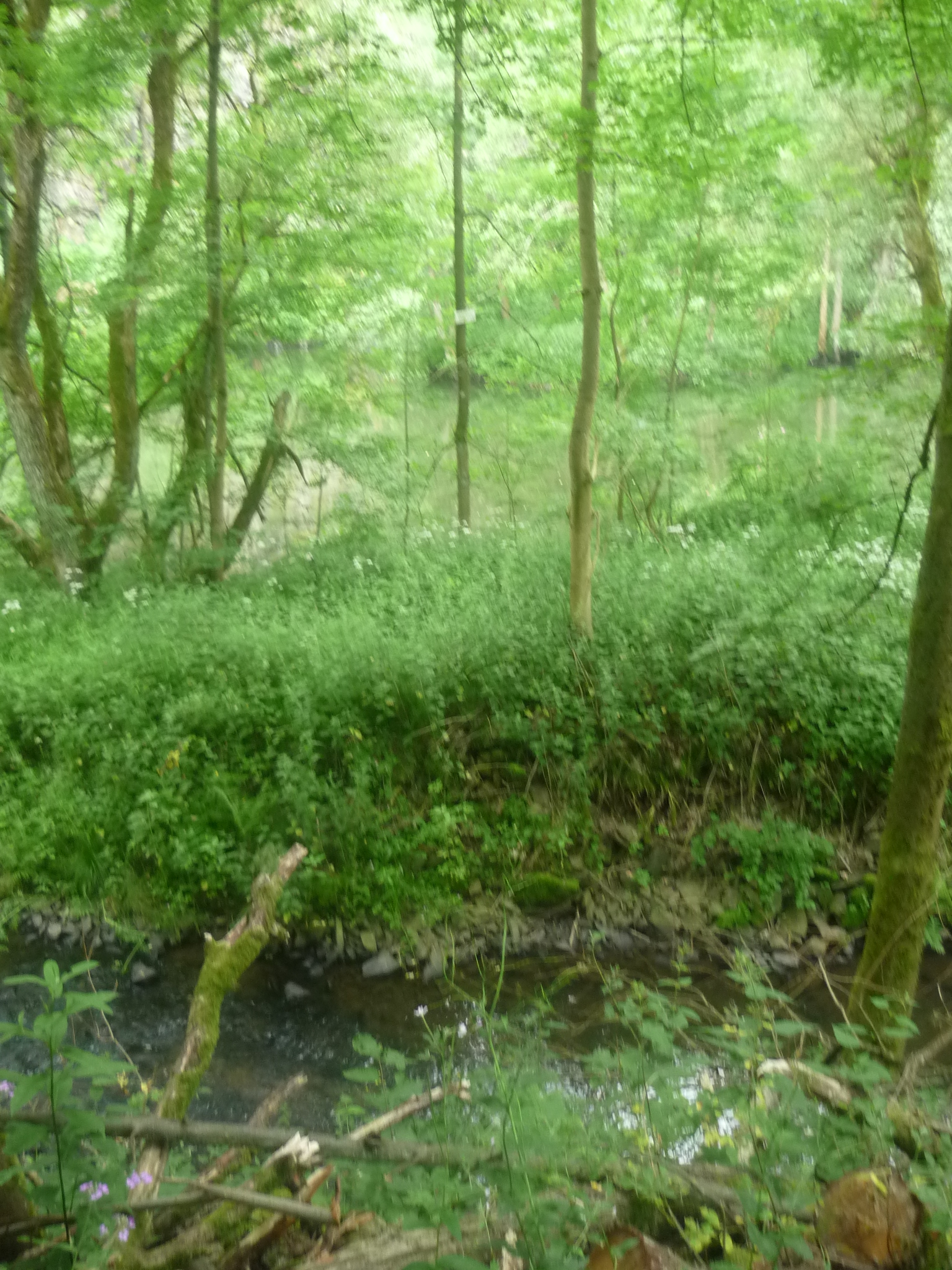
Bacher Lay

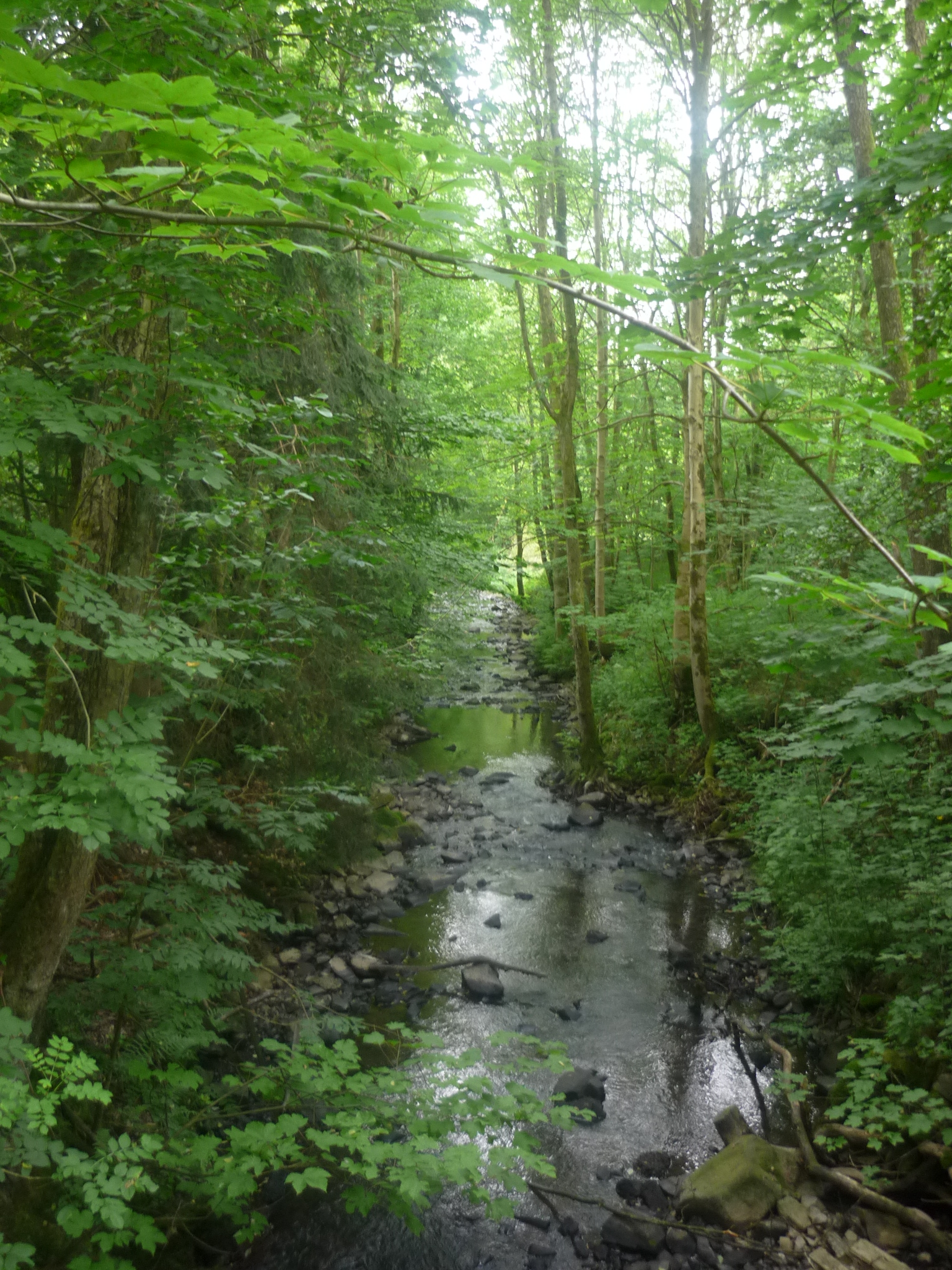
Bacher Lay

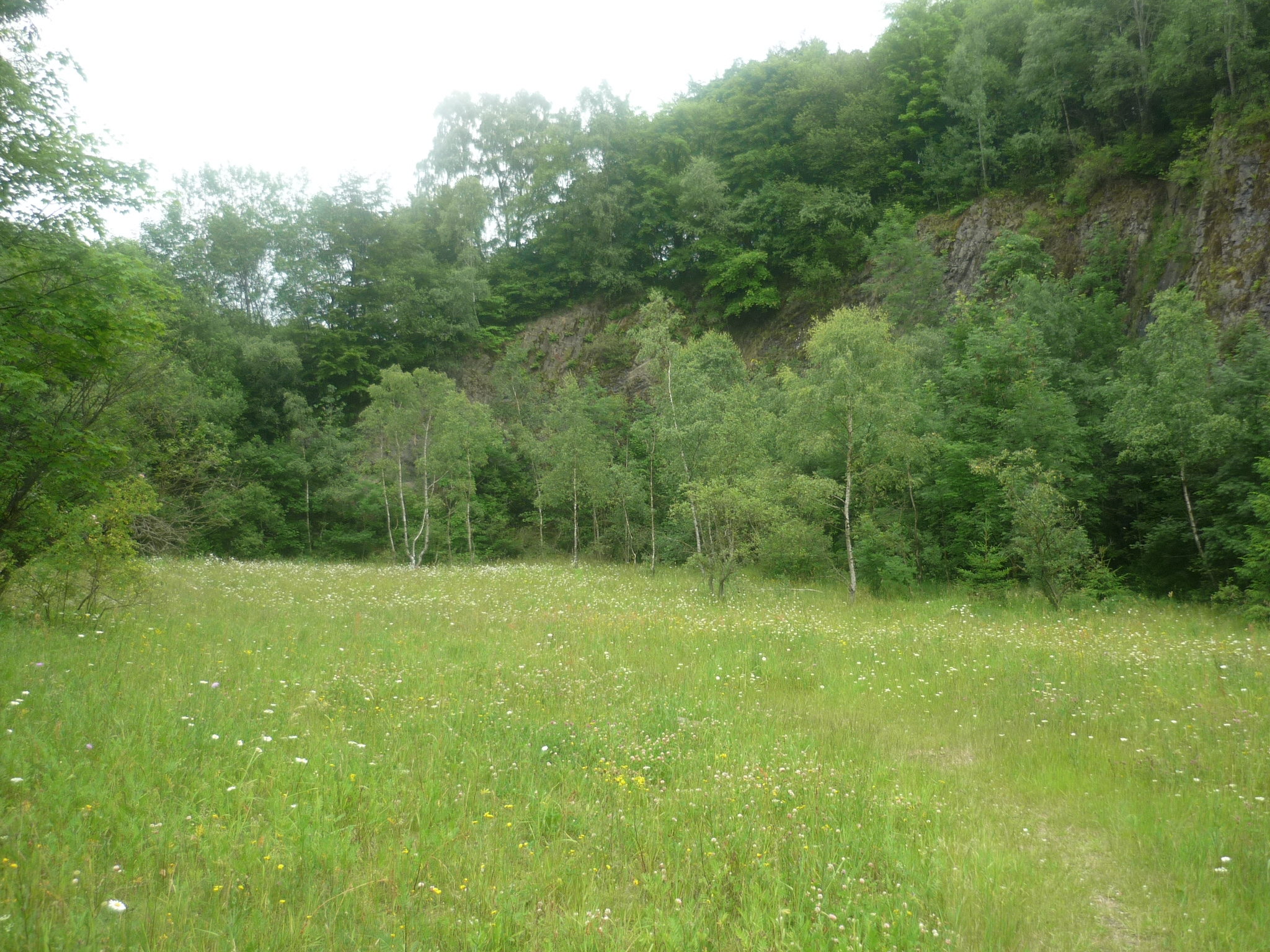
Bacher Lay

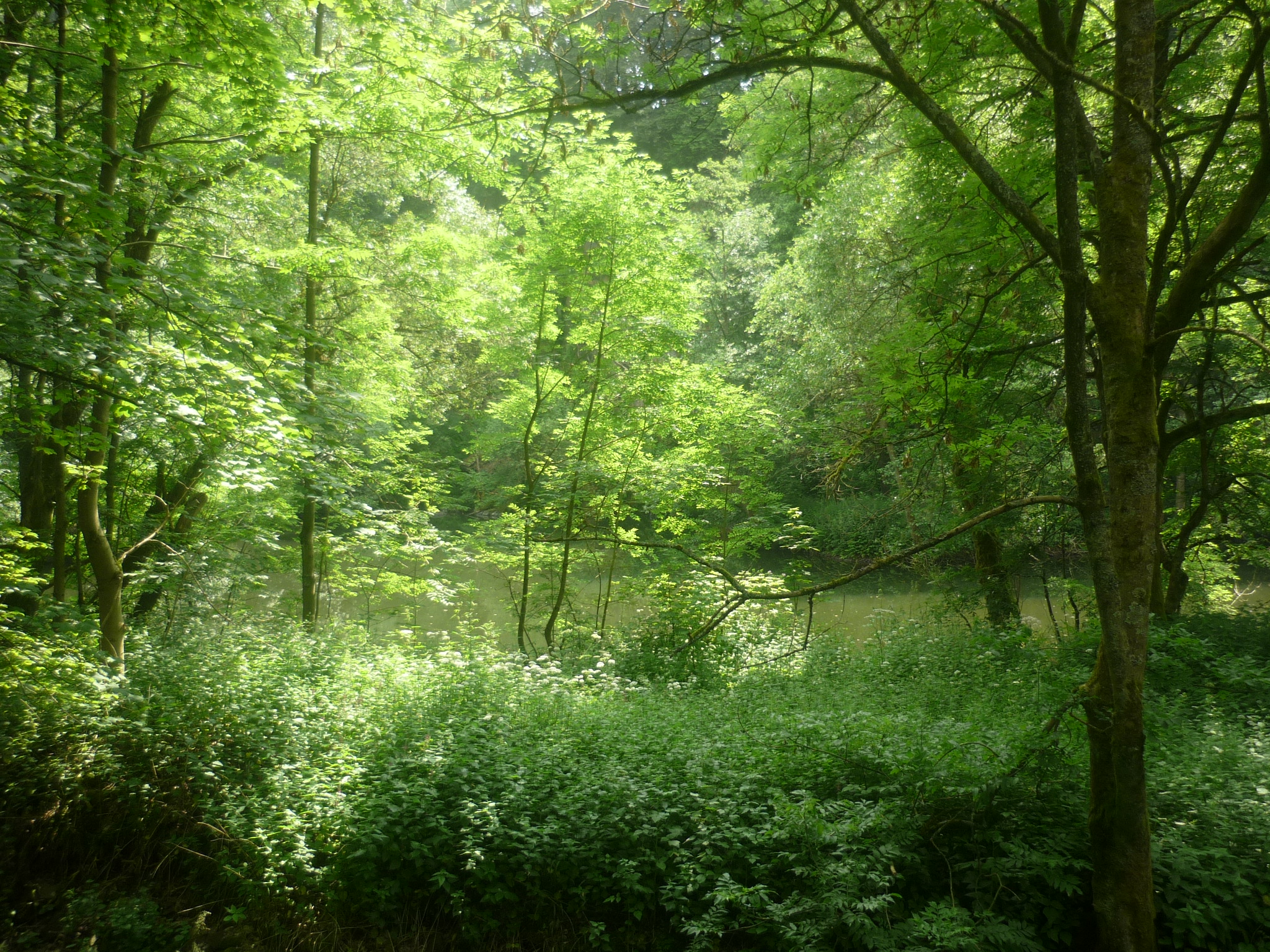
Bacher Lay
