= Willingen, Rhineland-Palatinate =

Willingen
- Municipality
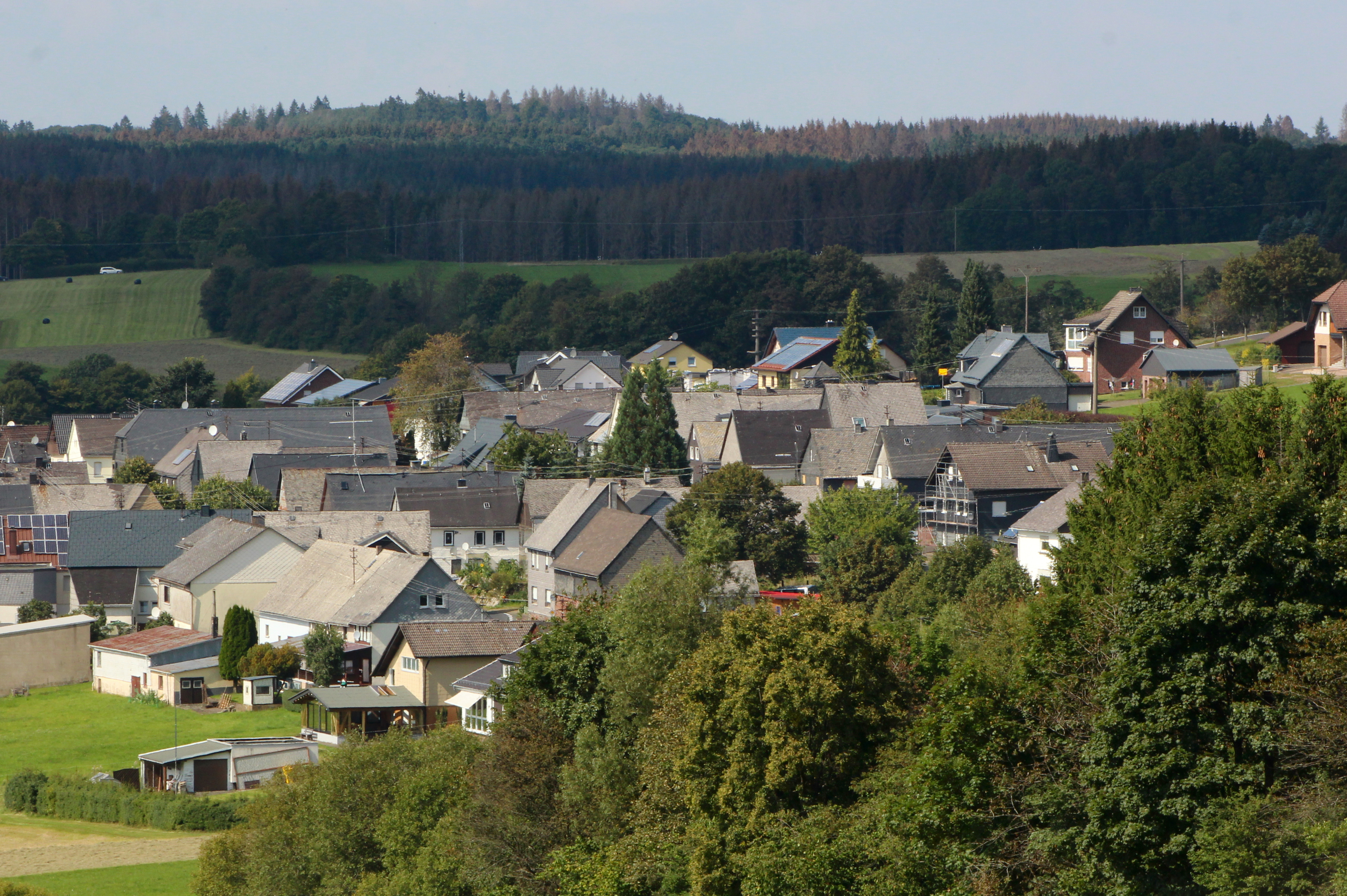

- Coat of arms

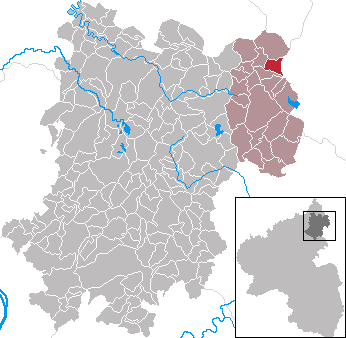
- Location of Willingen within Westerwaldkreis district
- Interactive map of Willingen
- Location within Germany Location within Rhineland-Palatinate
- Coordinates: 50°40′6″N 8°05′15″E
- Country: Germany
- State: Rhineland-Palatinate
- District: Westerwaldkreis
- Municipal assoc.: Rennerod

Government
  - Mayor (2019–24): Klaus Wehr

Area
  - Total: 3.68 km^{2} (1.42 sq mi)
- Elevation: 570 m (1,870 ft)

Population (2025-12-31)
  - Total: 279
  - Density: 75.8/km^{2} (196/sq mi)
- Time zone: UTC+01:00 (CET)
  - Summer (DST): UTC+02:00 (CEST)
- Postal codes: 56479
- Dialling codes: 02667
- Vehicle registration: WW
- Website: www.rennerod.de

Willingen (German pronunciation: [ˈvɪlɪŋən]) is an Ortsgemeinde – a municipality belonging to a Verbandsgemeinde – in the Westerwaldkreis in Rhineland-Palatinate, Germany.

== Geography ==
The municipality lies in the Westerwald between Siegen and Limburg on the boundary with Hesse. Within the municipality rises the Nister, which after flowing 64 km empties into the Sieg. Likewise within the municipality is the Westerwald's highest mountain, the Fuchskaute. Willingen belongs to the Verbandsgemeinde of Rennerod, a kind of collective municipality. Its seat is in the like-named town.

== History ==
In 1413, Willingen had its first documentary mention as Wildungen.

== Politics ==
The municipal council is made up of 8 council members who were elected in a majority vote in a municipal election on 13 June 2004.

== Economy and infrastructure ==
Although Willingen is a very small village, there are big firms, such as the Rompf coffin factory. There are a “homeland café” (Heimatcafé), an electrical installation and specialist shop, a tire business and a metalworking firm.

=== Transport ===
Willingen is located in the fare zone number 459 of the transport association Verkehrsverbund Rhein-Mosel (VRM), the local bus line 971 connects the village to the public transport. Right near the municipality, Bundesstraßen 54, linking Limburg an der Lahn with Siegen, and 414, leading from Hohenroth to Hachenburg, cross each other. The nearest Autobahn interchange is Haiger/Burbach on the A 45 (Dortmund–Frankfurt am Main), some 10 km away. The nearest InterCityExpress stop is the railway station at Montabaur on the Cologne-Frankfurt high-speed rail line.
