= Nistertal =

- Municipality
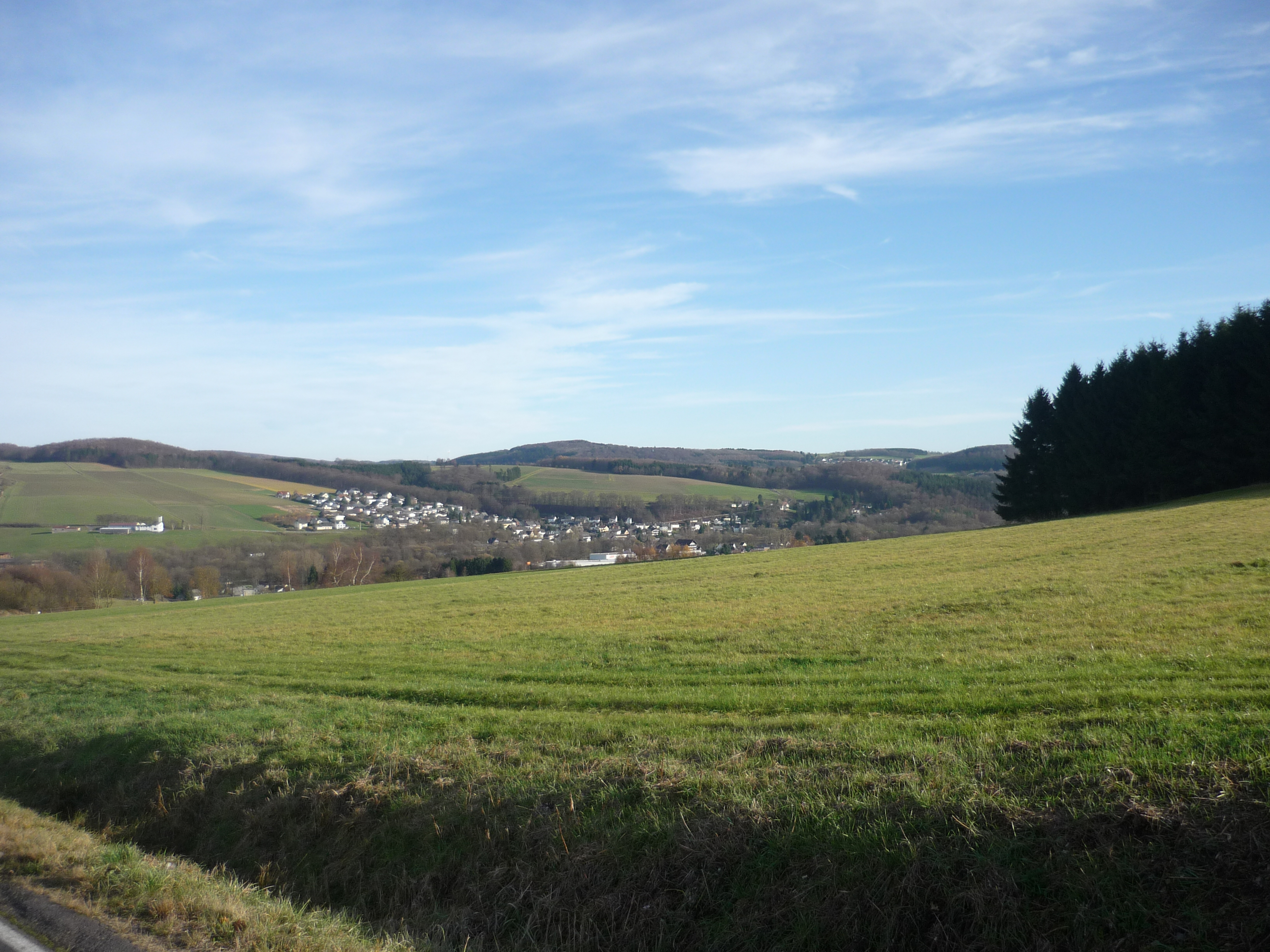
- Erbach (Nistertal)

- Coat of arms

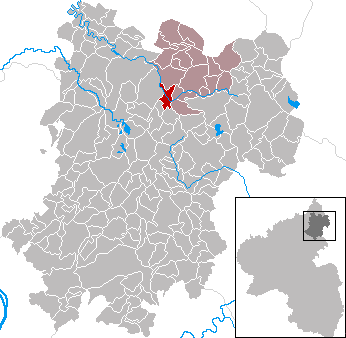
- Location of Nistertal within Westerwaldkreis district
- Interactive map of Nistertal
- Location within Germany Location within Rhineland-Palatinate
- Coordinates: 50°37′54″N 7°54′11″E
- Country: Germany
- State: Rhineland-Palatinate
- District: Westerwaldkreis
- Municipal assoc.: Bad Marienberg (Westerwald)
- Subdivisions: 2

Government
  - Mayor (2019–24): Christian Benner

Area
  - Total: 3.90 km^{2} (1.51 sq mi)
- Elevation: 320 m (1,050 ft)

Population (2025-12-31)
  - Total: 1,168
  - Density: 299/km^{2} (776/sq mi)
- Time zone: UTC+01:00 (CET)
  - Summer (DST): UTC+02:00 (CEST)
- Postal codes: 57647
- Dialling codes: 02661
- Vehicle registration: WW
- Website: www.nistertal-westerwald.de

Nistertal is an Ortsgemeinde – a community belonging to a Verbandsgemeinde – in the Westerwaldkreis in Rhineland-Palatinate, Germany.

== Geography ==
=== Location ===
The community lies in the Westerwald between Limburg and Siegen. Nistertal belongs to the Verbandsgemeinde of Bad Marienberg, a kind of collective municipality. Its seat is in the like-named town.

=== Constituent communities ===
Nistertal's Ortsteile are Büdingen and Erbach.

== History ==
In 1274, Büdingen had its first documentary mention. Erbach's first documentary mention followed in 1353.

=== Amalgamations ===
The community of Nistertal came into being in 1969 in the course of administrative reform through the merger of the communities of Büdingen and Erbach. For centuries before this, the Große Nister, flowing between the two places, marked not only a political boundary, but a dialectal and religious one, too.

== Politics ==
=== Municipal council ===
The municipal council is made up of 16 council members drawn from two voting communities (Wählergemeinschaften) who were elected in a majority vote in a municipal election on 13 June 2004.

=== Coat of arms ===
The two uppermost charges in the community's arms stand for the two constituent communities of Büdingen and Erbach. The hexagon and the miner's hammers symbolize the rich basalt deposits and their exploitation as the community's characteristic industry and livelihood. The alder twig refers to the Ortsteil name Erbach (from Erlenbach – Erle being German for “alder”). The wavy parting per pale represents the community's location on the Nister, with Büdingen on the left and Erbach on the right. The bridge that fills out the shield's lower portion is a symbol of the Erbach Bridge as well as the roadbridge between the two constituent communities. The tinctures gold and blue were those borne by the Duchy of Nassau. They refer to the community's centuries-long territorial allegiance to that state.

== Culture and sightseeing ==
=== Buildings ===
The railway bridge near Erbach across the river Nister was at the time of its completion in 1911 Germany's biggest concrete bridge. With a length of some 300 m and a height of almost 40 m, at the time still without steel armouring, it was held to be a technological wonder. After the Erbach-Bad Marienberg (Westerwald)-Fehl-Ritzhausen railway line was shut down in 1971, the bridge was preserved as a technological building monument.

Also worthy of mention is the Wasserbrücke (“Waterbridge”). At this bridge, water is borne across the tracks of the Nistertal-Bad Marienberg railway line.

== Economy and infrastructure ==
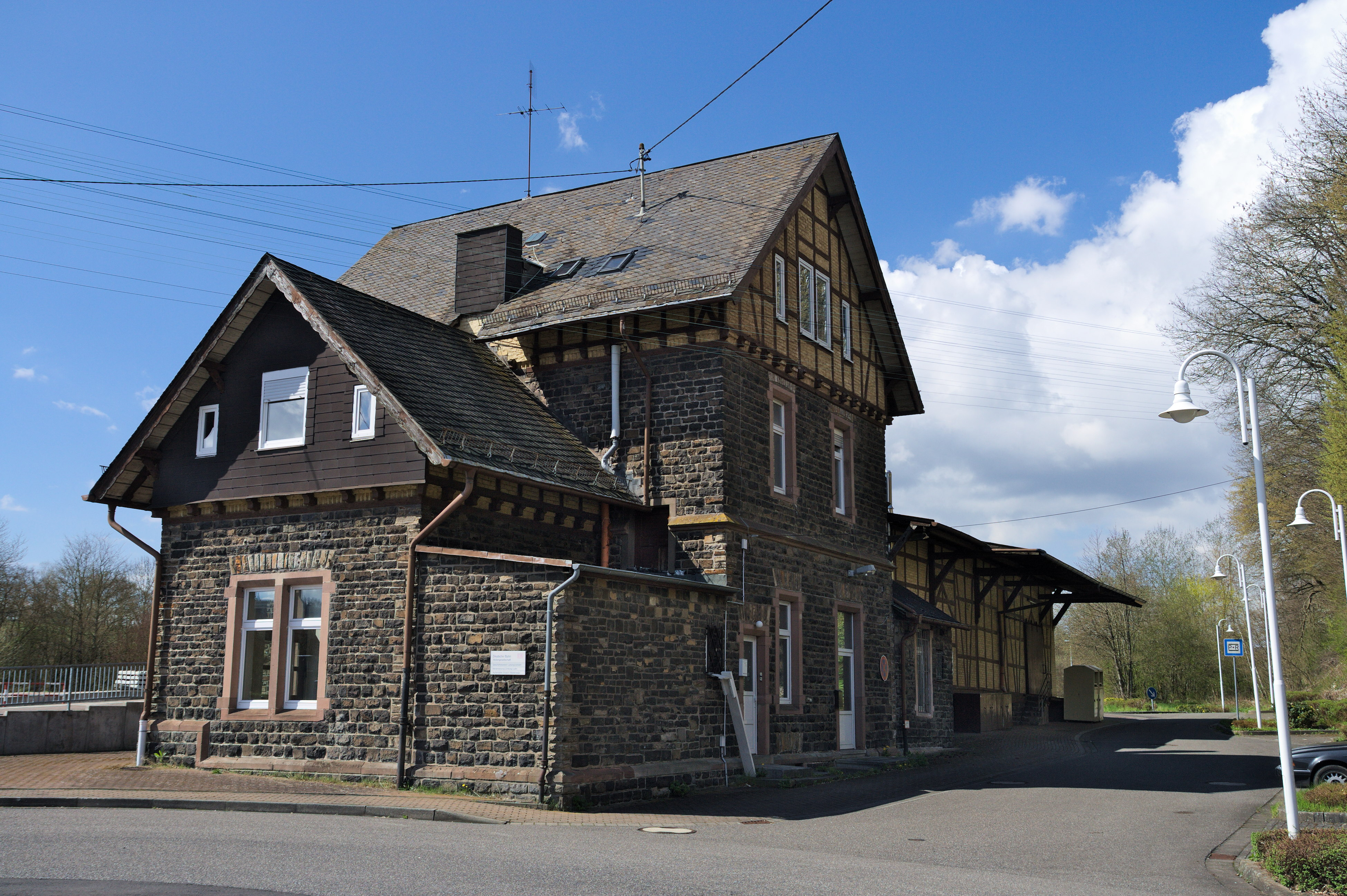
Nistertal- Bad Marienberg train station

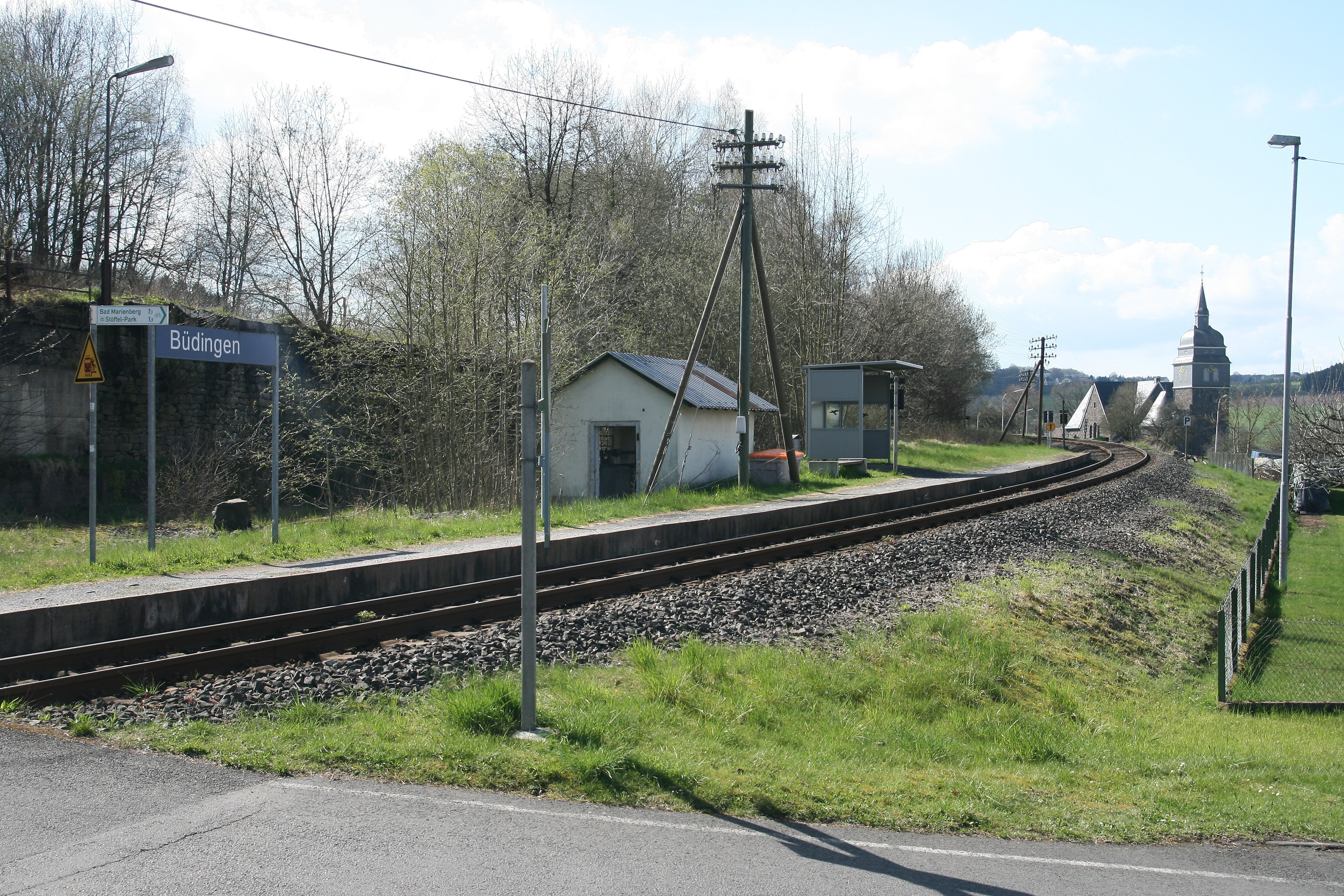
Train stop in Nistertal-Büdingen

North of the community runs Bundesstraße 414, leading from Driedorf-Hohenroth to Hachenburg. The nearest Autobahn interchanges are Montabaur on the A 3 (Cologne–Frankfurt), some 25 km away, and Haiger/Burbach on the A 45 (Dortmund–Hanau), some 27 km away. Nistertal-Bad Marienberg station lies on the Westerwald-Sieg-Bahn (RB90) railway of Hessische Landesbahn (HLB), section DreiLänderBahn from Limburg via Au (Sieg) to Siegen Hbf. From there, the cities of Cologne, Koblenz, Frankfurt am Main and Wiesbaden may be reached directly. Nistertal is located in the area of the transport association Verkehrsverbund Rhein-Mosel (VRM), zone 447. Nistertal-Bad Marienberg station also has a Bike and ride facility and a Park and ride lot. The nearest InterCityExpress stop is the railway station at Montabaur on the Cologne-Frankfurt high-speed rail line. Nistertal is located on Westerwaldsteig, a long distance walking- and cycling path from Herborn via Rennerod, Westerburg, Bad Marienberg and Hachenburg to Bad Hönningen.
