= Westerwald-Lahn-Taunus Geopark =

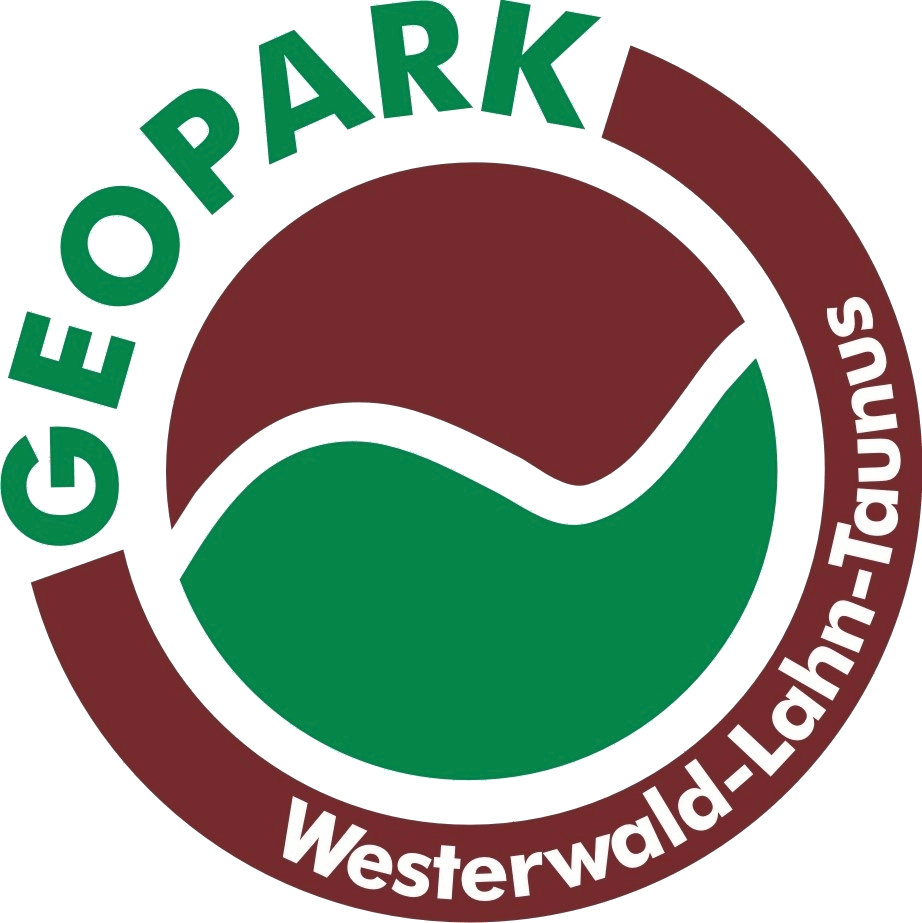
Logo of the Westerwald-Lahn-Taunus Geopark

The Westerwald-Lahn-Taunus National Geopark (German: Nationale GeoPark Westerwald-Lahn-Taunus) is a community initiative by the counties of Altenkirchen, Lahn-Dill, Limburg-Weilburg, Westerwald and Marburg-Biedenkopf. The geopark, which covers an area of 3,846 km², lies within parts of the German states of Hesse and Rhineland-Palatinate and within the natural region of the German Central Uplands.

The geopark is primarily a 'geopark of raw materials' ("Geopark der Rohstoffe") and is characterised by the diversity of mineral resources that occur here. From prehistoric times to the present day, mining and the processing of raw materials played an important role for the people of the region. Working with marble, stone and iron as well as clay was the basis for its prosperous economic and cultural development and at the same time the central theme that runs through the entire geopark.

On 8 November 2012, the Westerwald-Lahn-Taunus Geopark was certified as a 'national geopark'.
