= Bad Marienberg =

- Town
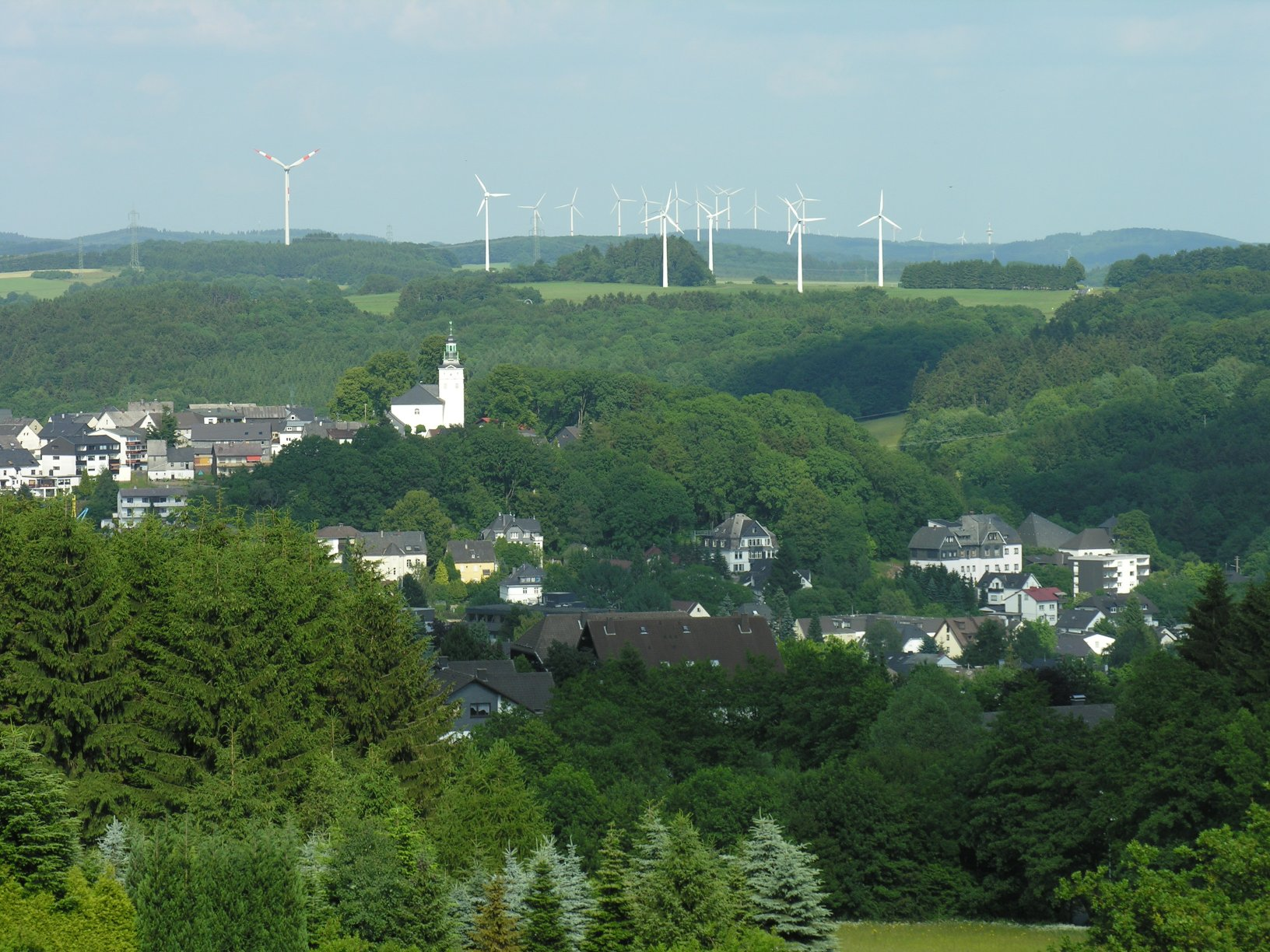
- Bad Marienberg

- Coat of arms

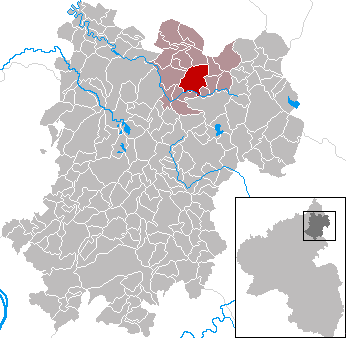
- Location of Bad Marienberg within Westerwaldkreis district
- Interactive map of Bad Marienberg
- Location within Germany Location within Rhineland-Palatinate
- Coordinates: 50°39′07″N 7°57′08″E
- Country: Germany
- State: Rhineland-Palatinate
- District: Westerwaldkreis
- Municipal assoc.: Bad Marienberg (Westerwald)
- Subdivisions: 3

Government
  - Mayor (2019–24): Sabine Willwacher (SPD)

Area
  - Total: 9.95 km^{2} (3.84 sq mi)
- Elevation: 470 m (1,540 ft)

Population (2025-12-31)
  - Total: 6,101
  - Density: 613/km^{2} (1,590/sq mi)
- Time zone: UTC+01:00 (CET)
  - Summer (DST): UTC+02:00 (CEST)
- Postal codes: 56470
- Dialling codes: 02661
- Vehicle registration: WW
- Website: www.badmarienberg.de

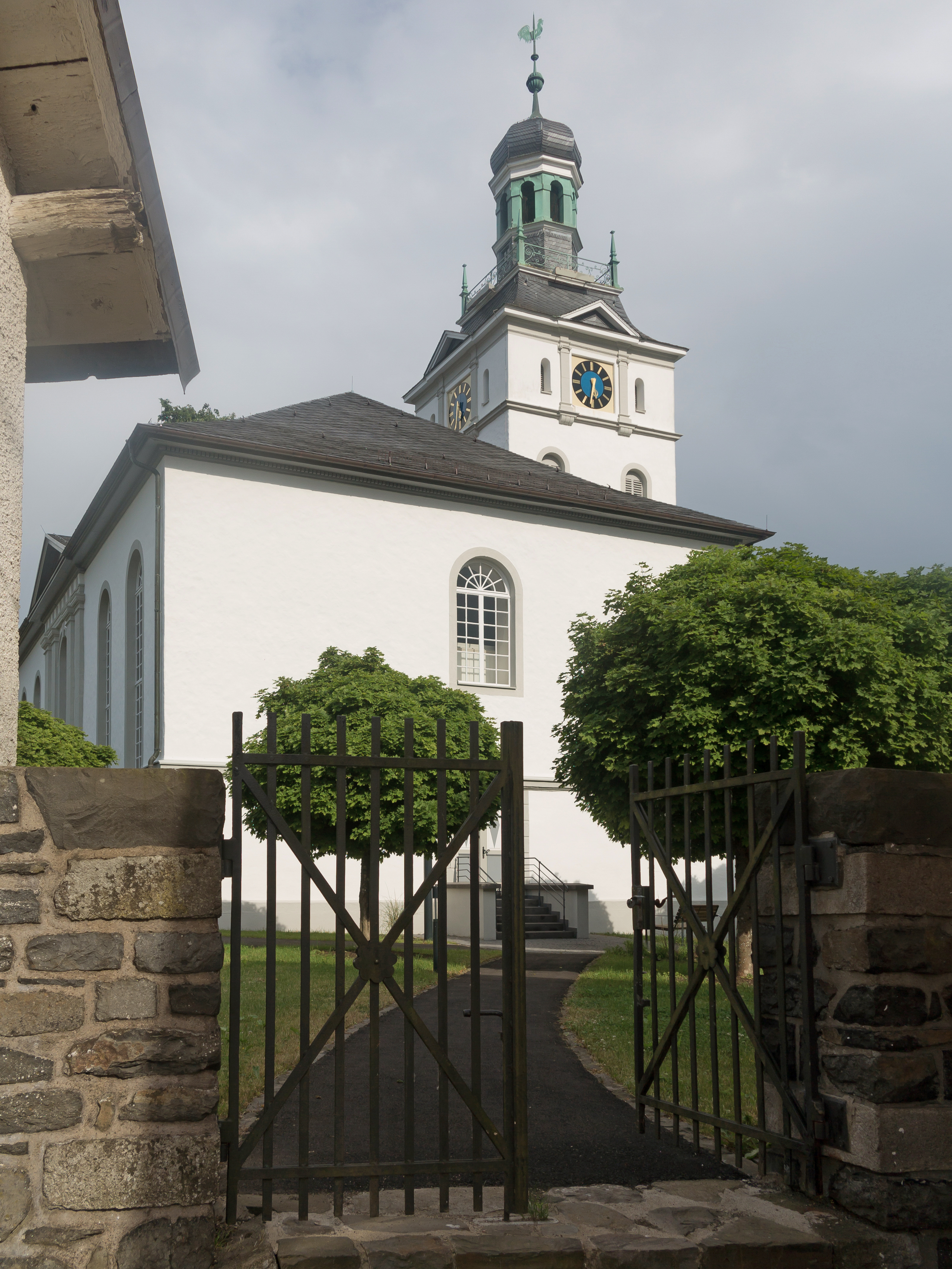
Bad Marienberg, reformed church

Bad Marienberg (Westerwald) (German pronunciation: [baːt maˈʁiːənˌbɛʁk]) is a town in the Westerwaldkreis in Rhineland-Palatinate, Germany, and also the seat of the like-named Verbandsgemeinde, a kind of collective municipality.

== Geography ==
The community lies in the Westerwald between Limburg and Siegen. From east to west through the town flows the river Nister, which is part of the Sieg drainage basin.

Bad Marienberg's Stadtteile are Eichenstruth, Langenbach and Zinhain.

== History ==
=== Middle Ages ===
In 1048, Bad Marienberg had its first documentary mention. It is likely that this same source gave rise to the name Westerwald, since the area around Bad Marienberg lies directly west of Herborn. In 1258, Marienberg was described as Mons sanctae Mariae. In the 18th century, the formerly separate communities of Obermarienberg, still an easily recognizable ring-shaped settlement around the parish church today, and Untermarienberg grew together.

Marienberg was part of the lordly domain in the Westerwald that was formed out of the three Gerichte (official regions) of Marienberg, Emmerichenhain and Neukirch, and which Count Otto I of Nassau won in 1255 in the Ottonian-Walramian hereditary division. After a further division in 1303, the area passed to Otto's son Henry III of Nassau-Siegen, making it part of Nassau-Dillenburg. From 1343 to 1561, the overlordship in the Westerwald was then held by the Nassau-Dillenburg-Beilstein branch of the family. After they died out, Count Johann VI of Nassau-Dillenburg ("the Elder") received the inheritance, thereby uniting these German lands – albeit only for a short time.

=== Modern times ===
After further territorial exchanges within the Nassau dynasty through inheritances, Marienberg ended up, as part of the Beilstein lordly domain, under Prince William IV's governance. Once again, in 1742–1743, he succeeded in uniting all Ottonian lands within the Holy Roman Empire. Within the Orange German possessions now ruled from Dillenburg, Marienberg was at the latest by 1783 put under the Amt of Beilstein. The parish of Marienberg counted roughly 450 souls in 1580 and included the villages of Bach, Bölsberg, Eichenstruth, Fehl, Großseifen, Illfurth, Langenbach, Marienberg, Hof, Pfuhl, Ritzhausen, Stockhausen, Unnau and Zinhain. The Counties of Sayn-Hachenburg and Sayn-Altenkirchen both lay only a few kilometres away to the northwest.

Along with the lordly domain of Beilstein, the village fell in 1806 to the Napoleonic Grand Duchy of Berg, in which, in 1808, it was grouped into the Arrondissement of Dillenburg within the Département of Sieg. In 1815, Marienberg went to the Duchy of Nassau. The Amt of Marienberg, which was newly organized in 1816, comprised 43 villages and 20 estates with 1,805 families and 7,085 persons. At the same time, the Amt of Marienberg lay under the jurisdiction of the Dillenburg Criminal Court. In the course of a short-lived administrative reform, Marienberg was annexed in 1849 to the newly founded Landkreis (rural district) of Hachenburg, before the old arrangement was brought back into force in 1854.

In 1866 the Duchy of Nassau passed to Prussia and became, as the Regierungsbezirk of Wiesbaden, part of the province of Hesse-Nassau. With the institution of rural districts after the Prussian model, Marienberg became in 1867 seat of the Oberwesterwaldkreis with the Ämter of Hachenburg, Marienberg and Rennerod. The last went to the newly created Westerburg district (which also got the Amt of Wallmerod as well as a few places from the Amt of Selters from the Unterwesterwaldkreis) in 1885–1886 on the occasion of administrative reform.

Although in 1890 Marienberg had only 707 (mostly Evangelical) inhabitants and was officially said to be a village, it already had a considerable infrastructure at its disposal: the village had a provincial council office (Landratsamt), a court (Landgericht Limburg an der Lahn), a taxation and land registry office, a post and telegraph office, a credit union and an agency for the Nassauische Landesbank. Moreover, there was a tannery in the village, and nearby were brown coal and ironstone mines along with clay pits.

When the district of Westerburg was united with the old Oberwesterwaldkreis to form the new, bigger Oberwesterwaldkreis in 1932, Marienberg lost its function as an administrative seat to Westerburg. Having had town rights conferred on 1 April 1939, Marienberg then belonged to the French occupation zone and was part of the Upper Presidium of Rhineland-Hesse-Nassau.

Since 1947, the town has been part of the Bundesland of Rhineland-Palatinate. On 10 August 1967 the town had the title Bad (literally "bath" – the title means that the town is a recognized spa) bestowed upon it, after already having received the title of Kneipp resort in 1961.

In 1972, Bad Marienberg, along with 17 other Ortsgemeinden was grouped into a Verbandsgemeinde, which today is home to just under 20,000 inhabitants (as of 2007).

== Climate ==
Climate data for Bad Marienberg (1991–2020 normals)
Month	Jan	Feb	Mar	Apr	May	Jun	Jul	Aug	Sep	Oct	Nov	Dec	Year
Mean daily maximum °C (°F)	1.9 (35.4)	2.9 (37.2)	7.1 (44.8)	12.1 (53.8)	15.9 (60.6)	19.0 (66.2)	21.1 (70.0)	20.8 (69.4)	16.4 (61.5)	11.3 (52.3)	5.9 (42.6)	2.7 (36.9)	11.4 (52.5)
Daily mean °C (°F)	−0.2 (31.6)	0.4 (32.7)	3.6 (38.5)	7.8 (46.0)	11.6 (52.9)	14.6 (58.3)	16.6 (61.9)	16.4 (61.5)	12.6 (54.7)	8.1 (46.6)	3.7 (38.7)	0.7 (33.3)	8.0 (46.4)
Mean daily minimum °C (°F)	−2.3 (27.9)	−1.9 (28.6)	0.7 (33.3)	4.0 (39.2)	7.6 (45.7)	10.6 (51.1)	12.8 (55.0)	12.7 (54.9)	9.5 (49.1)	5.6 (42.1)	1.7 (35.1)	−1.2 (29.8)	5.0 (41.0)
Average precipitation mm (inches)	99.5 (3.92)	83.6 (3.29)	86.0 (3.39)	57.9 (2.28)	79.2 (3.12)	82.2 (3.24)	104.5 (4.11)	88.2 (3.47)	86.3 (3.40)	92.1 (3.63)	94.8 (3.73)	110.4 (4.35)	1,064.6 (41.91)
Average precipitation days (≥ 1.0 mm)	19.0	18.1	17.8	14.3	15.7	14.8	16.2	15.1	14.9	17.2	19.7	21.0	204
Average relative humidity (%)	84.1	81.9	79.0	70.9	73.1	74.0	73.2	73.7	79.0	82.7	86.0	85.6	78.6
Mean monthly sunshine hours	46.2	70.4	121.6	177.5	198.1	200.9	211.2	200.2	146.0	96.9	43.8	34.5	1,547.3
Source: World Meteorological Organization

== Politics ==
=== Community council ===
The council is made up of 23 council members, including the honorary and presiding mayor (Bürgermeister), who were elected in a municipal election on May 25, 2014.

	CDU	SPD	Grüne	Total
2014	9	13	0	22 Seats
2009	8	14	0	22 Seats
2004	9	12	1	22 Seats

=== Mayor ===
The mayor is Sabine Willwacher (SPD), re-elected in 2019.

Willwacher was first elected mayor of the city of Bad Marienberg on May 25, 2014. She is succeeding fellow party member Dankwart Neufurth, who had retired after running the office from 2004 to 2014.

=== Town partnerships ===
The town maintains partnership arrangements with the district seat of Marienberg in the Ore Mountains (Erzgebirge) and with Pagny-sur-Moselle in France.

=== Parks ===
Within Bad Marienberg's town limits is a spa garden with a Kneipp centre and a bandshell where concerts are regularly held in the summer. Adjoining this is a new part of the park with a herb garden and a barefoot course.

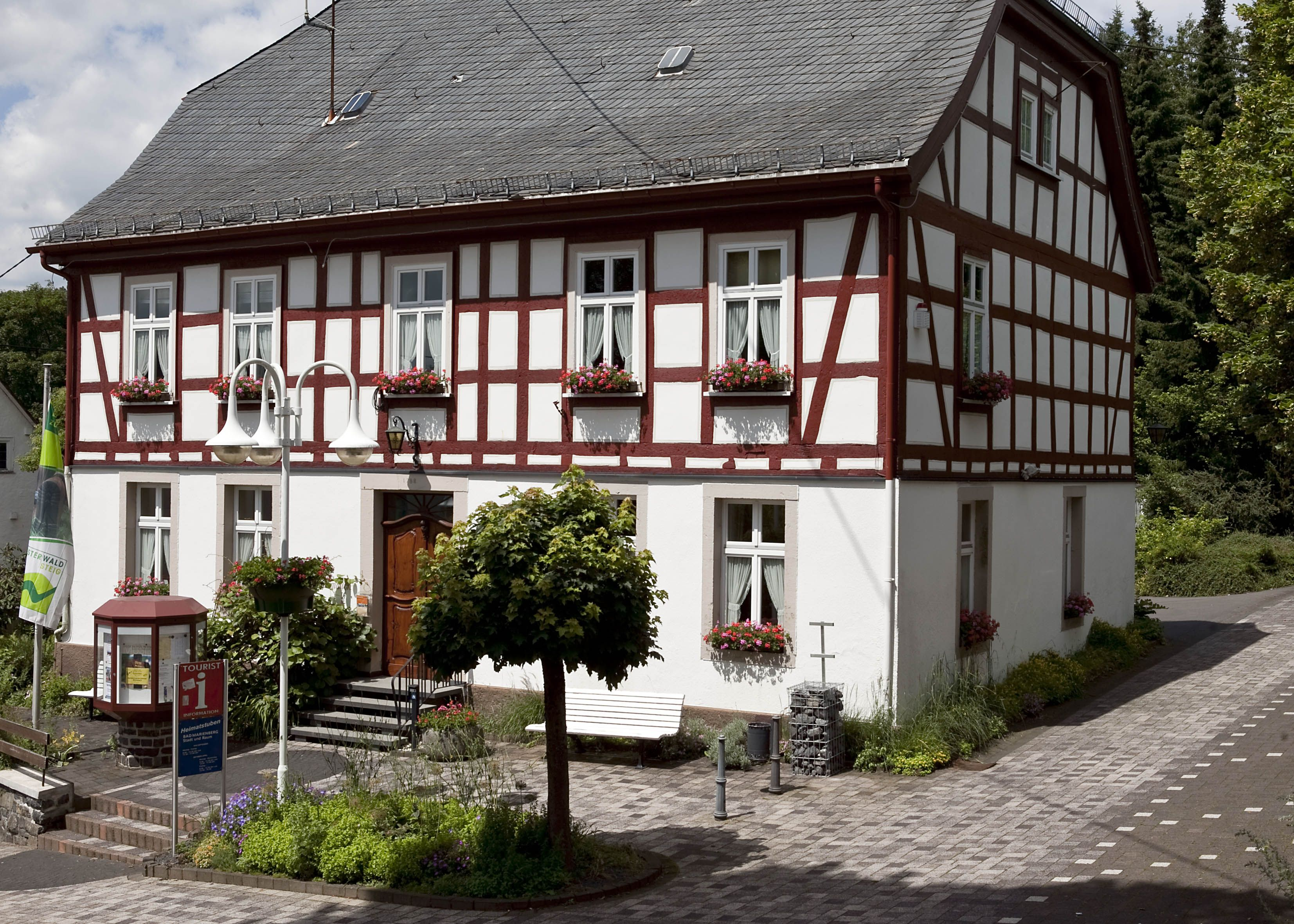
Tourist Information Bad Marienberg

Between Bad Marienberg and the outlying centre of Zinhain is the Basaltpark, a disused basalt quarry which is open to the public and laid out with hiking paths, information plaques about the geology, and a museum. Right near the Basaltpark is found the Wildpark Bad Marienberg (wildlife park).

Between Bad Marienberg and Nisterau Bach is the nature reserve of Bacher Lay.

== Economy and infrastructure ==
=== Economy ===
Bad Marienberg is home to these worldwide operating companies:

KEMPF Fahrzeugbau

LEBEK International Fashion Group

MENK Apparatebau

=== Transport ===
The local bus lines 449, 455, 436, 464, 470, 483 and 962 connect Bad Marienberg to the public transport.

Bad Marienberg is located in the area of the transport association Verkehrsverbund Rhein-Mosel (VRM), zones 455 and 456.

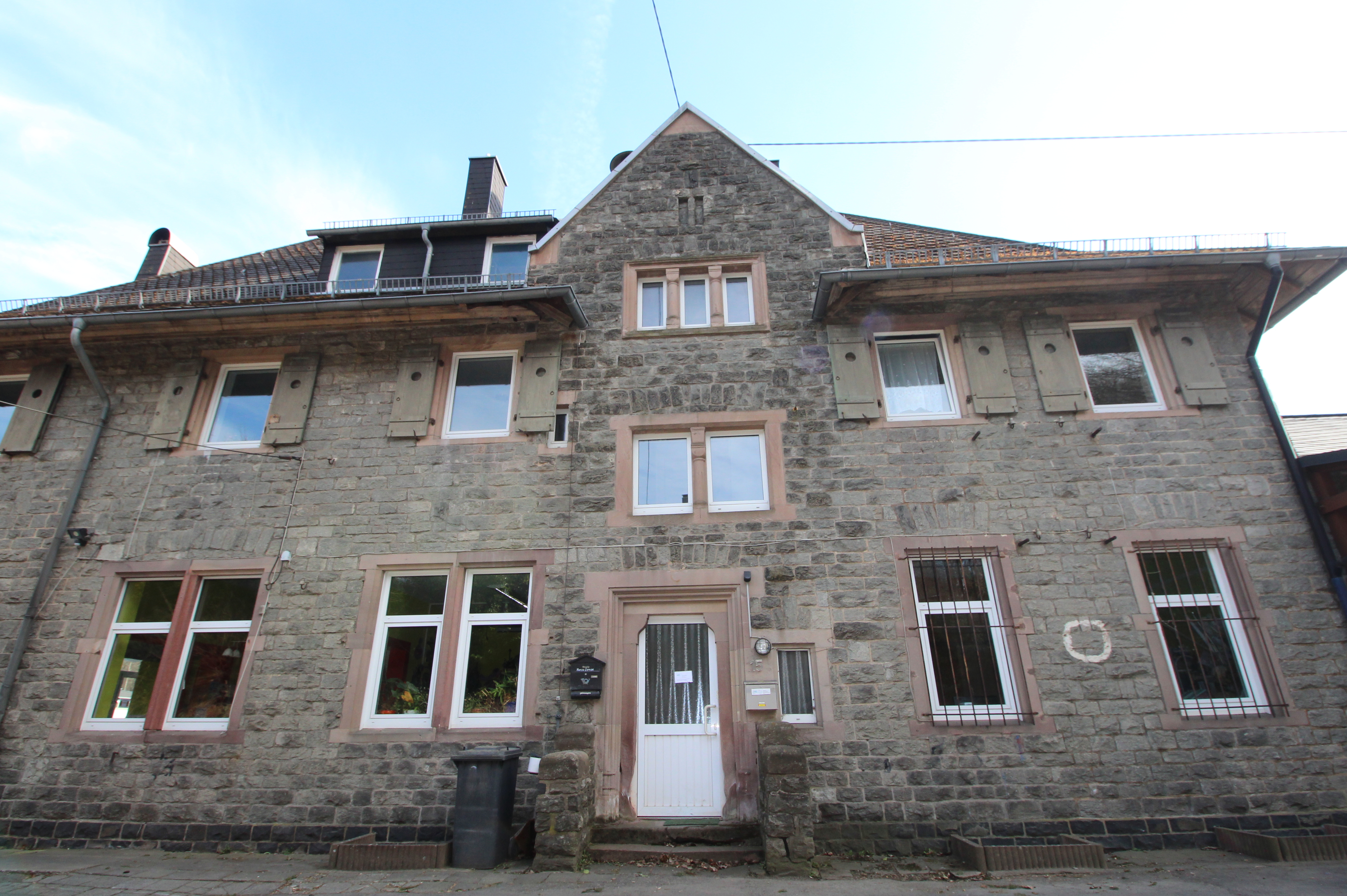
The former train station in Bad Marienberg

Railway bridge "Schwarze Nister" ("black Nister") in Bad Marienberg

Right near the town runs Bundesstraße 414 leading from Driedorf-Hohenroth to Altenkirchen. The nearest Autobahn interchange is Haiger-Burbach on the A 45 (Dortmund–Gießen), roughly 22 km away.

Bad Marienberg is connected to the Westerwald-Sieg-Bahn (RB90) railway (Limburg (Lahn) - Siegen Hbf) only by local bus. Nistertal-Bad Marienberg station is situated in the village of Nistertal, 6 km away from Bad Marienberg.

The former Bad Marienberg train station was located in the former Erbach - Fehl-Ritzhausen railway, the Erbach station has been renamed to "Nistertal / Bad Marienberg".

Bad Marienberg is located on Westerwaldsteig, a long distance walking path from Herborn via Rennerod, Westerburg, Bad Marienberg and Hachenburg to Bad Hönningen.

The nearest InterCityExpress stop is the railway station at Montabaur on the Cologne-Frankfurt high-speed rail line, which is approximately 30 km away.
The nearest airport is Siegerland Airport about 15 km northeast of Bad Marienberg.
Since Siegerland Airport -as of June 2015- does not offer any scheduled passenger flights, the nearest international airports are Frankfurt and Cologne Bonn Airport, both circa 100 km away.

=== Media ===
Near Bad Marienberg, T-Systems runs a transmitter for VHF and television which has a 174-m-high freestanding tubular steel mast. Südwestrundfunk (SWR) sends all four of its radio programmes from here. In the summer of 2008, the switchover from analogue TV transmissions to DVB-T is to be carried out.

Also, the Deutscher Wetterdienst runs a weather station right near this transmission facility in Bad Marienberg.

=== Europa-Haus ===
In Bad Marienberg is found the main branch of Europa-Haus of 128 others that have sprung up. It is sponsored through an endowment and serves as an education and meeting place.

== Notable residents ==
- Oliver Bimber (born 1973), computer scientist and university teacher
- Anette Rückes, (born 1951), track and field athlete
- Frank Schimmelfennig, (born 1963), political scientist
