= Journal of European Integration =

- Discipline: Political science, international relations, European studies
- Language: English
- Edited by: Nathalie Brack, Thomas Christiansen, Anna Herranz-Surralés, Ana Juncos

Publication details
- History: 1977–present
- Publisher: Routledge
- Frequency: 8/year
- Open access: Hybrid
- Impact factor: 2.9 (2022)

Standard abbreviations
- ISO 4: J. Eur. Integr.

Indexing
- ISSN: 0703-6337 (print); 1477-2280 (web)
- LCCN: 2013268572
- OCLC no.: 4093765

Links
- Journal homepage; Online access; Online archive

The Journal of European Integration is a peer-reviewed academic journal covering all aspects of the European integration process. It is published by Routledge and the editors-in-chief are Nathalie Brack (Université Libre de Bruxelles), Thomas Christiansen (Luiss University), Anna Herranz-Surralés (Maastricht University), and Ana Juncos (Bristol University).

== History ==
The journal was established in 1977 and initially published three times a year by the Centre d'Études et de Documentation Européennes (Université de Montréal, Canada). From January 1981, the journal was sponsored by the Canadian Council for European Affairs (Conseil Canadien des Affaires Européennes). Since January 1998, it has been published by Routledge. The number of issues per year has risen to eight, including two or three special issues.

== Abstracting and indexing ==
The journal is abstracted and indexed in Current Contents/Social and Behavioral Sciences, EBSCO databases, Scopus, and the Social Sciences Citation Index. According to the Journal Citation Reports, the journal has a 2022 impact factor of 2.9.

== See also ==
- List of political science journals
- List of international relations journals
