= Oliver Bimber =

German computer scientist

Oliver Bimber

Oliver Bimber (born 1973 in Bad Marienberg, Germany) is a German computer scientist. He is professor for computer graphics at the Johannes Kepler University Linz, Austria where he heads the Institute of Computer Graphics.

== Curriculum Vitae ==
At the age of 36, Oliver Bimber was appointed to a full university professor (2009) and became head of the Institute of Computer Graphics at Johannes Kepler University Linz. From 2003-2010 he served as a Junior Professor of Augmented Reality at the Media System Science Department of Bauhaus University, Weimar. He received a PhD (2002) in Engineering from the Technische Universität Darmstadt, Germany, and a Habilitation degree (2007) in Computer Science (Informatik) at the Technical University of Munich. From 2001 to 2002, Bimber worked as a senior researcher at the Fraunhofer Center for Research in Computer Graphics in Providence, RI/USA, and from 1998 to 2001 he was a scientist at the Fraunhofer Institute for Computer Graphics in Rostock, Germany. Earlier affiliations include the IBM T.J. Watson Research Center (New York, USA), the Dundalk Institute of Technology (Dundalk, Ireland), and the University of Applied Science Giessen (Giessen, Germany).

Bimber co-authored the book "Displays: Fundamentals and Applications" (2011) with Rolf R. Hainich and the book "Spatial Augmented Reality" (2005) with Ramesh Raskar (MIT). From 2005 until 2015, he served on the editorial board of the IEEE Computer Magazine. The VIOSO GmbH was founded in his group in 2005. He and his students received several awards for their research and inventions, and have won scientific competitions, such as the ACM Siggraph Student Research Competition (1st place 2006 and 2008, 2nd place 2009 and 2011), and the ACM Student Research Competition Grand Final (2006) that was presented together with the Turing Award.

Bimber's research interests include visual computing and optics in the context of next-generation display and imaging technologies.
