= Cooperation and Conflict =

Academic journal

- Discipline: International Relations
- Language: English
- Edited by: Benjamin de Carvalho and Kristin Haugevik

Publication details
- History: 1965-present
- Publisher: SAGE Publications (Norway)
- Frequency: Quarterly
- Impact factor: 2.1 (2024)

Standard abbreviations
- ISO 4: Coop. Confl.

Indexing
- CODEN: COCFEF
- ISSN: 0010-8367 (print); 1460-3691 (web)
- LCCN: 2011205150
- OCLC no.: 610393955

Links
- Journal homepage; Online access; Online archive

Cooperation and Conflict is a quarterly peer-reviewed generalist International Relations academic journal that covers the field of international studies broadly conceived. Although the journal springs out of a Nordic and European focus, it aims at publishing articles on a broader set of issues, with a premium on theoretical innovation. The current editors in chief are Benjamin de Carvalho and Kristin Haugevik, with Paul Beaumont and Øyvind Svendsen serving as editors. Since 2023 the Journal is based at the Norwegian Institute of International Affairs in Oslo (NUPI). The journal was established in 1965 and is published by SAGE Publications in association with the Nordic International Studies Association.

== Abstracting and indexing ==
The journal is abstracted and indexed in Scopus and the Social Sciences Citation Index. According to the Journal Citation Reports, the journal has a 2025 impact factor of 2.1, ranking it 92 out of 322 journals in the category "Political Science" and 44 out of 169 journals in the category "International Relations".

== Former Editors in Chief ==
- Krister Wahlbäck (1965–1969)
- Klaus Törnudd (1969–1971)
- Johan Jørgen Holst (1972–1975)
- Nikolaj Petersen (1976–1980)
- Christer Jönsson (1981–1982)
- Lauri Karvonen (1983–1985)
- Arild Underdal (1986–1989)
- Christian Thune (1990–1993)
- Bengt Sundelius (1994–1999)
- Iver B. Neumann (1999–2001)
- Knud Erik Jørgensen (2002–2005)
- Tarja Väyrynen and Frank Möller (2006–2009)
- Lee Miles & Jan Ångström (2010–2013)
- Annika Björkdal & Martin Hall (2014–2016)
- Annika Björkdal (2016–2023)
- Benjamin de Carvalho & Kristin Haugevik (2023–)

== See also ==
- List of political science journals
- List of international relations journals
