= Journal of European Public Policy =

- Discipline: Political science
- Language: English
- Edited by: Jeremy Richardson; Berthold Rittberger

Publication details
- History: 1994–present
- Publisher: Taylor and Francis
- Frequency: 10/year
- Impact factor: 4.177 (2019)

Standard abbreviations
- ISO 4: J. Eur. Public Policy

Indexing
- CODEN: JEPPFG
- ISSN: 1350-1763 (print); 1466-4429 (web)
- LCCN: 97658154
- OCLC no.: 31227642

Links
- Journal homepage; Online access; Online archive

Journal of European Public Policy is a peer-reviewed academic journal covering the study of public policy, European politics and the EU. The current joint editors-in-chief are Jeremy Richardson (University of Oxford) and Berthold Rittberger (LMU Munich).

A number of the journal's special issues have been reprinted in book form.

== Abstracting and indexing ==
The journal is abstracted and indexed in:

- SCImago
- Web of Science

According to the Journal Citation Reports, the journal has a 2019 impact factor of 4.177, ranking it 7th out of 180 journals in the category "Political Science" and 3rd out of 48 journals in the category "Public Administration".

== See also ==
- List of political science journals
