= Nister (river) =

River in Germany

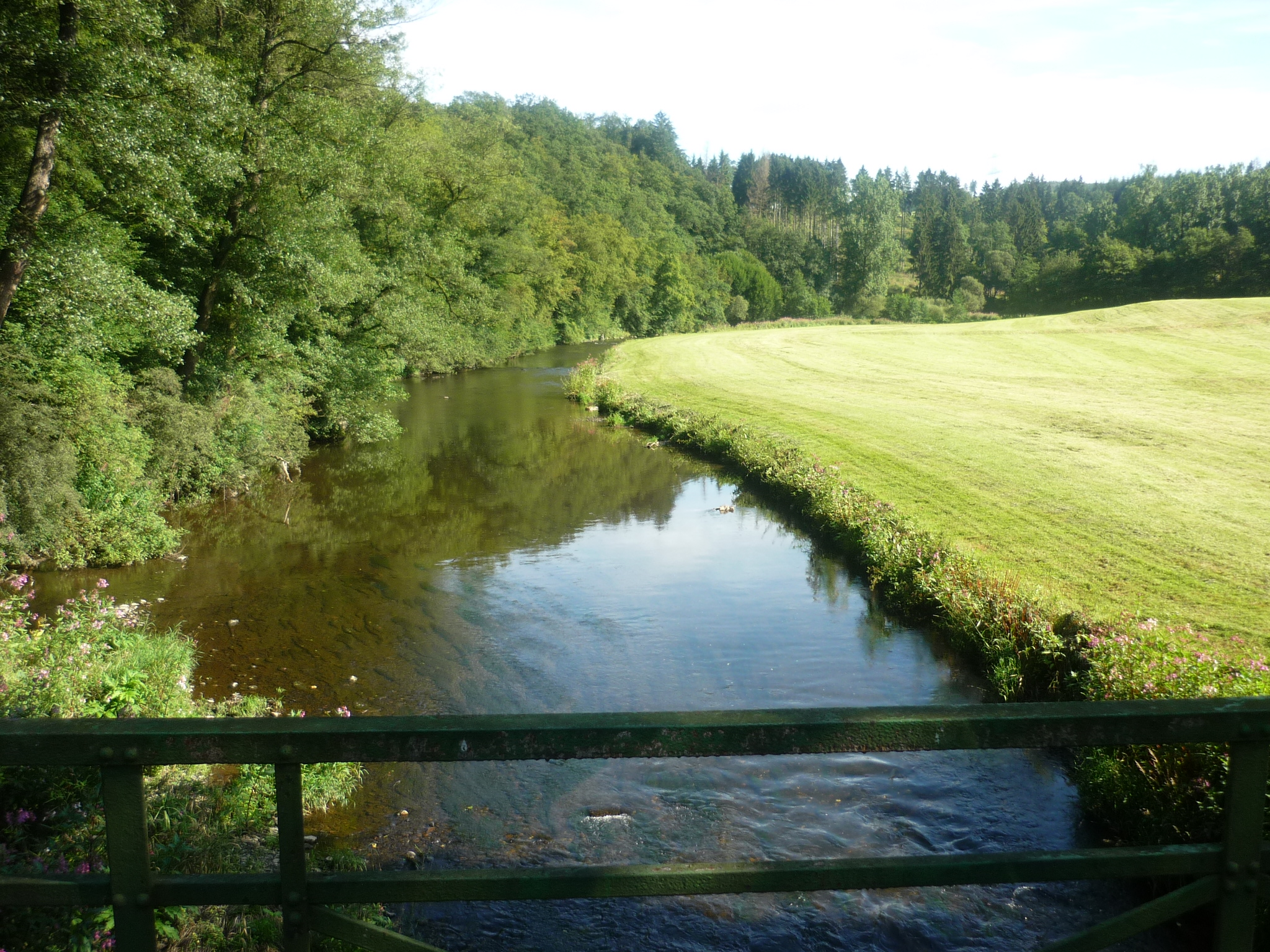
- The Nister between Wissen and Helmeroth

Location
- Country: Germany

Physical characteristics
- Source
  - location: Westerwald
- Mouth
  - location: Sieg
  - coordinates: 50°46′33″N 7°42′29″E
- Length: 63.8 km (39.6 mi)
- Basin size: 246 km^{2} (95 sq mi)

Basin features
- Progression: Sieg→ Rhine→ North Sea

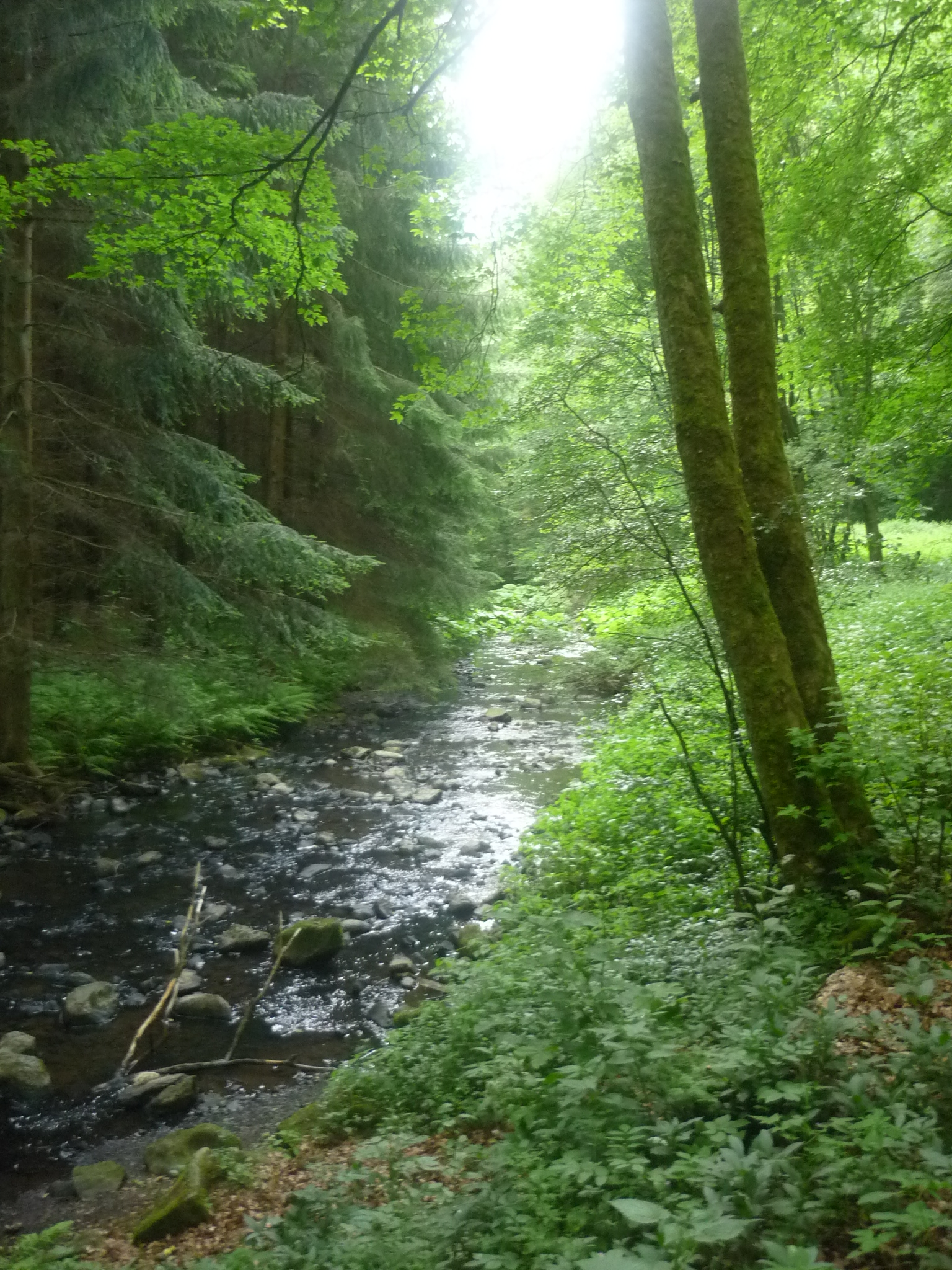
The Schwarze Nister in the Bacher Lay near Bad Marienberg

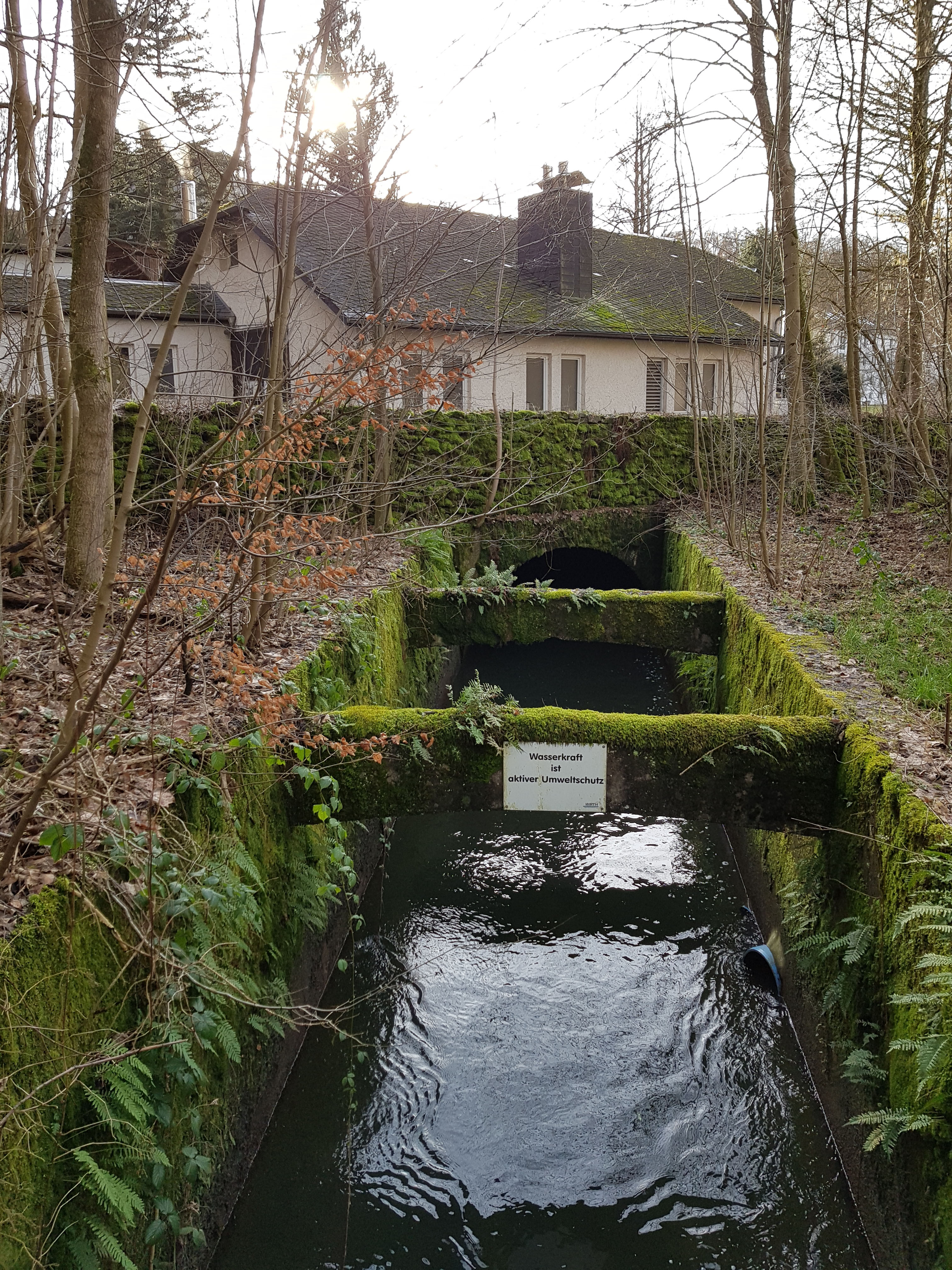
Hydropower plant at Marienstatt Abbey at the Nister

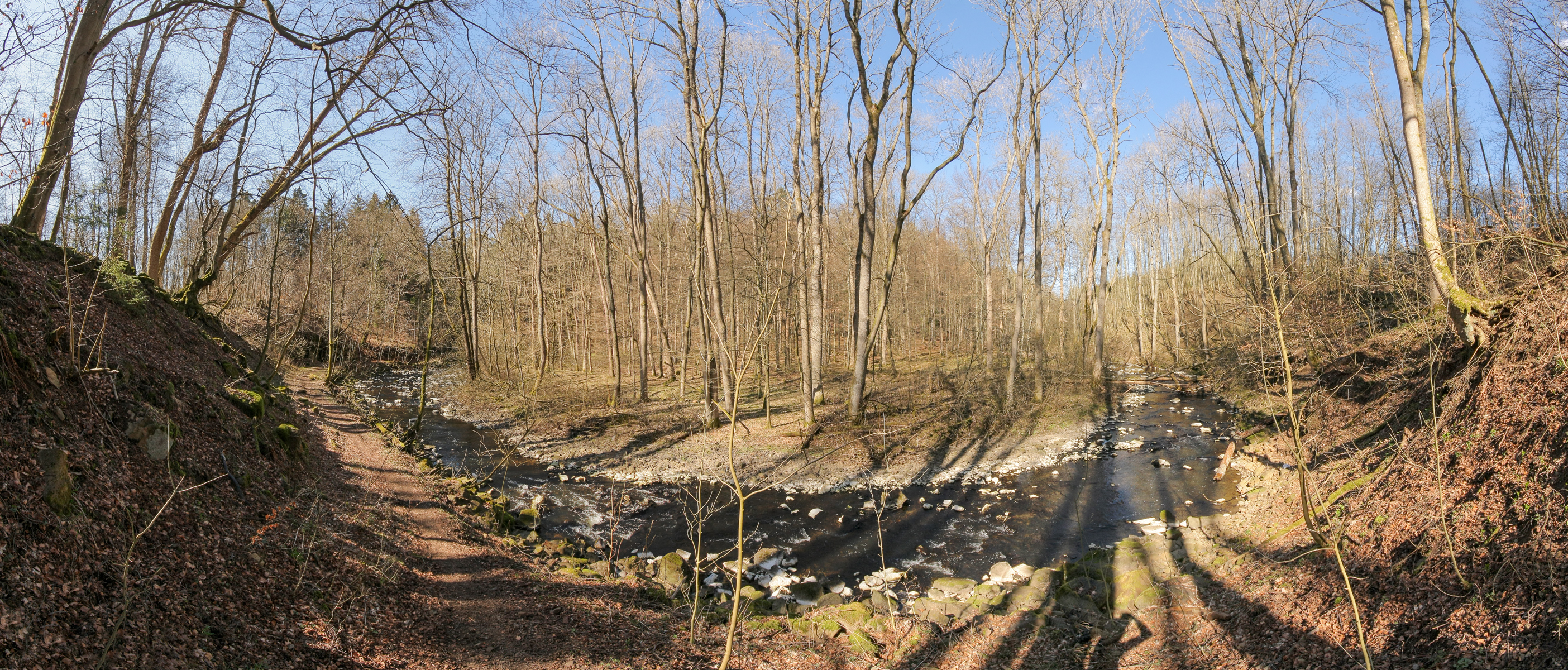
The Valley of the Nister near Höhn in March

The Nister (German pronunciation: [ˈnɪstɐ]), also called the Great Nister (German: Große Nister) to distinguish it from its tributary, the Black Nister, is a river in Rhineland-Palatinate, Germany.

The Nister is a right tributary of the Sieg. It is 64 km (40 mi) long. Its source is in the Westerwald hills, near Willingen. It flows south of Bad Marienberg and north of Hachenburg. Near Wissen the Nister flows into the Sieg.

It flows through the rocky upland region known as Kroppach Switzerland.

== See also ==
- List of rivers of Rhineland-Palatinate
