= Redoute, Bad Godesberg =

Redoute
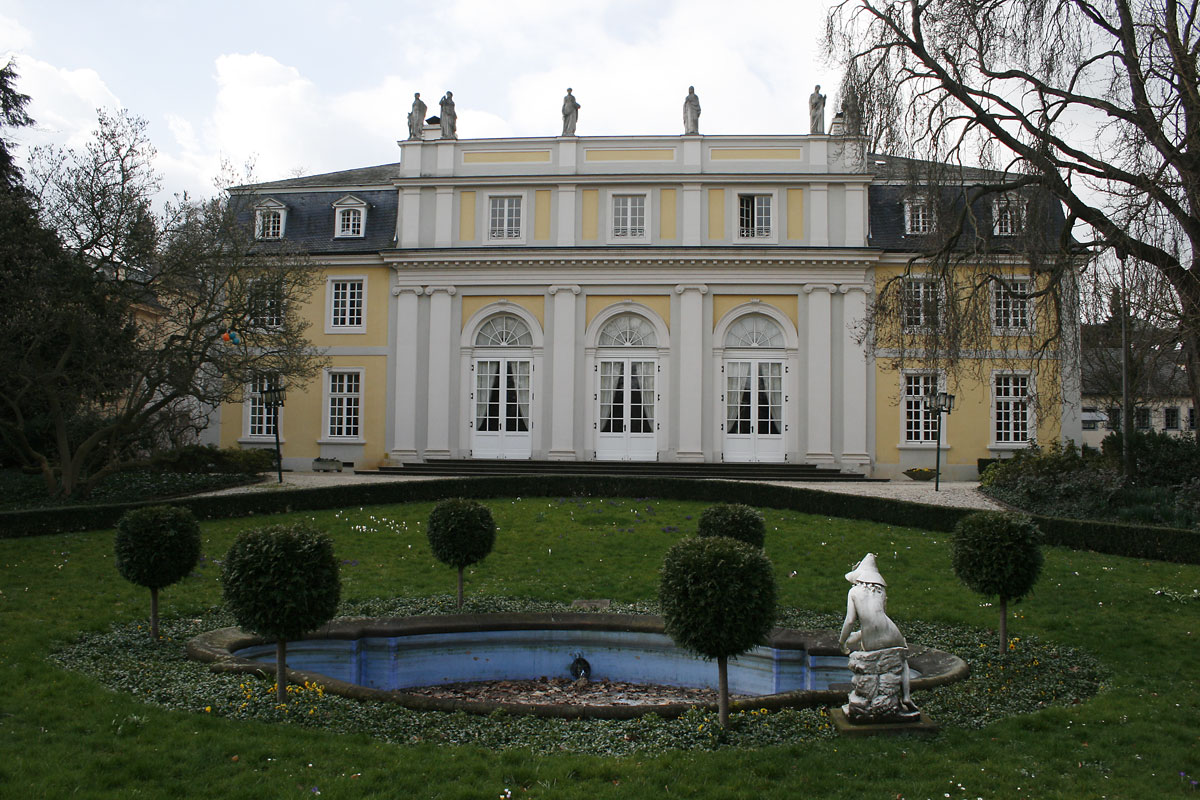
- The Redoute from the park
- Interactive map of the Redoute area

General information
- Architectural style: Neoclassical
- Location: Bad Godesberg, North Rhine-Westphalia, Germany
- Coordinates: 50.681544°N 7.153062°E
- Construction started: 1790
- Inaugurated: 1792
- Renovated: 1972, 2011

Website
- www.redoute-bonn.de

The Redoute in Bad Godesberg, now part of Bonn, North Rhine-Westphalia, Germany, is a hall opened in 1792 for balls of the court of Archduke Maximilian Francis of Austria. When Bonn was the location of the government of the Federal Republic of Germany, from 1949 to 1990, state receptions were held at the Redoute. Today, the listed historical building is used for events.

== History ==
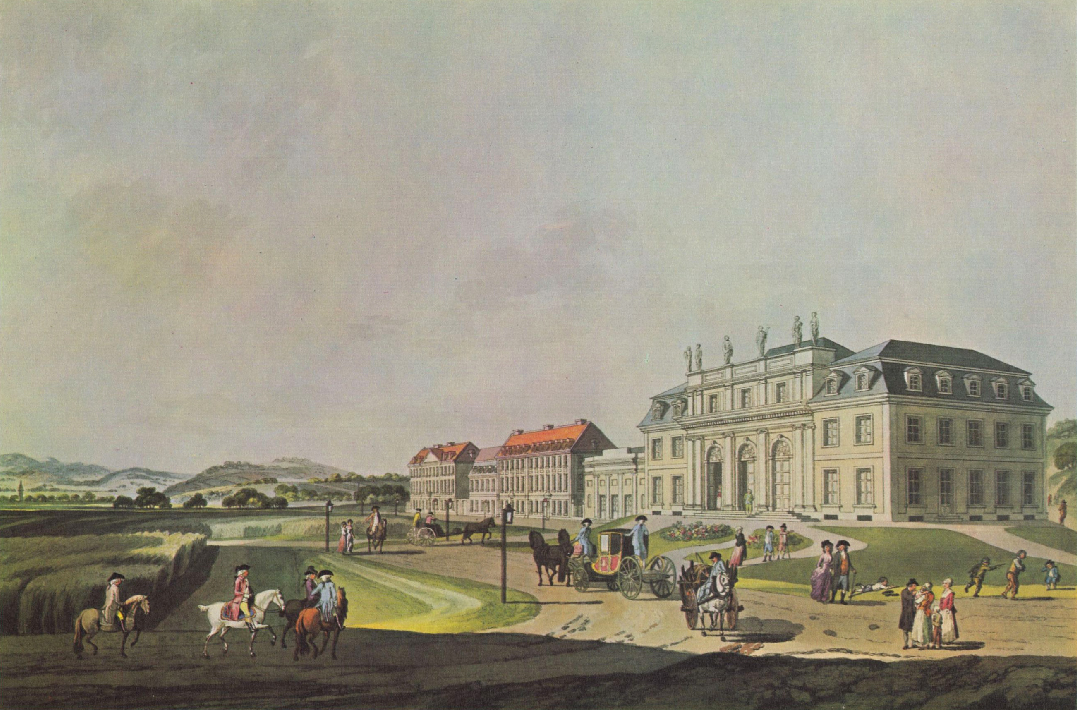
Redoute and Kurfürstenallee in 1792

When the spring water in Godesberg was found to be of spa quality, Archduke Maximilian Francis of Austria developed the town as a spa. The Redoute was built in Neoclassical style from 1790, designed by Martin Leydel. It was planned to be used for balls and other entertainment of the court and spa visitors. It was opened in 1792, and was a venue for balls, games, performances of plays, opera, ballet and concerts of the court orchestra, with Ludwig van Beethoven as a violinist and violist. In 1792, Beethoven played for Joseph Haydn, and they planned there that Beethoven would visit Vienna again to become a master student of Haydn. In 1793, Mozart's Die Zauberflöte was performed for the first time in Germany, only two years after the premiere in Vienna. The building was completed in 1820.

When Bonn was under French government, entertainment stopped, and the building was used as an art gallery, and a school for girls. In 1856, the property was bought by Victor Wendelstadt (1819–1884), a banker from Cologne. The adjacent park was expanded and laid out as an English landscape garden. A gate was taken from the garden that had to give way to the building of the Cologne Main station. The family arranged concerts by Clara Schumann and Johannes Brahms, among others.

On 22 January 1920, the town of Godesberg bought the building and the park to restore it to use it again as a spa with cultural events.

After World War II, the Redoute was used by the British Army. With the founding of the Federal Republic, it became a location for receptions. A reception was held there on 12 September 1949 after Theodor Heuss had been elected the first president of Germany. The Redoute was the location to receive guests on state visits, also for the New Years's reception of the president (Neujahrsempfang des Bundespräsidenten), and for the celebration of national holidays by ambassadors.

From 1973 to 1976, the Redoute was restored. The property was run from 1975 by Günnewig Hotels & Restaurants, offering the halls for private celebrations and for conferences. The government and ambassadors held receptions and events there until 1999. The Redoute was splendidly furnished with pieces in national property, selected based on images from the Bonner Kulturamt. The pieces were removed in 2010 when the contract ended. Further restoration and renovations began in early 2011, including technical improvements necessary to meet modern standards. From the end of 2011, La Redoute has been managed by Redoute Bonn GmbH, again offering rooms for private functions, seminars and weddings, among other purposes.

The Redoute, its park and adjacent buildings are listed as historic buildings.

== Literature ==
- Andreas Denk, Ingeborg Flagge: Architekturführer Bonn. Dietrich Reimer Verlag, Berlin 1997, ISBN 3-496-01150-5, p. 101.
- Hermann Josef Roth: DuMont Kunst-Reiseführer Bonn: von der römischen Garnison zur Bundeshauptstadt – Kunst und Natur zwischen Voreifel und Siebengebirge. DuMont, Köln 1988, ISBN 978-3-7701-1970-7, p. 160/185.
- Paul Clemen: Kunstdenkmäler der Stadt und des Kreises Bonn. L. Schwann, Düsseldorf 1905, p. 293, = Die Kunstdenkmäler der Rheinprovinz, vol. 5, p. 589. ISBN 3-590-32113-X).
