= Marienstatt Abbey =

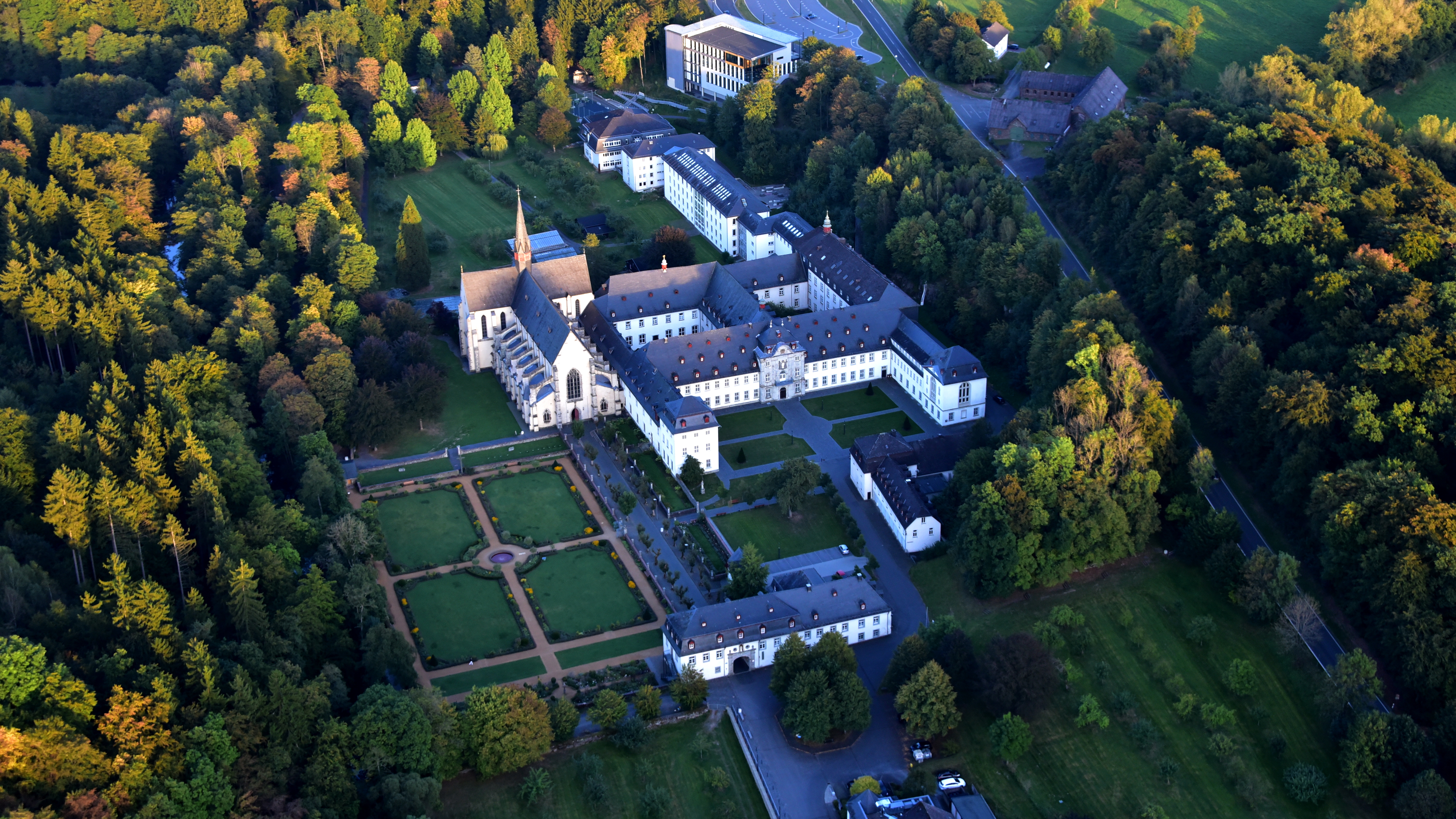
- The Cistercian monastery in 2016

- Location within Rhineland-Palatinate
- 50°41′06″N 07°48′11″E
- Location: Streithausen, Rhineland-Palatinate, Germany
- Denomination: Catholic (Cistercians)
- Website: www.abtei-marienstatt.de

History
- Founded: 1212
- Dedication: Assumption of Mary

Architecture
- Style: Gothic; Baroque

Marienstatt Abbey (German: Abtei Marienstatt, Latin: Abbatia Loci Sanctae Mariæ) is a Cistercian monastery and a pilgrimage site in Streithausen, Westerwaldkreis, Rhineland-Palatinate, in the Nister valley near Hachenburg.

The abbey has an early-Gothic Basilica with the largest organ in the Westerwald, a library, a brewery with restaurant, a shop for books and art, a guest house, and a privately supported secondary school, the Privates Gymnasium Marienstatt.

== History ==
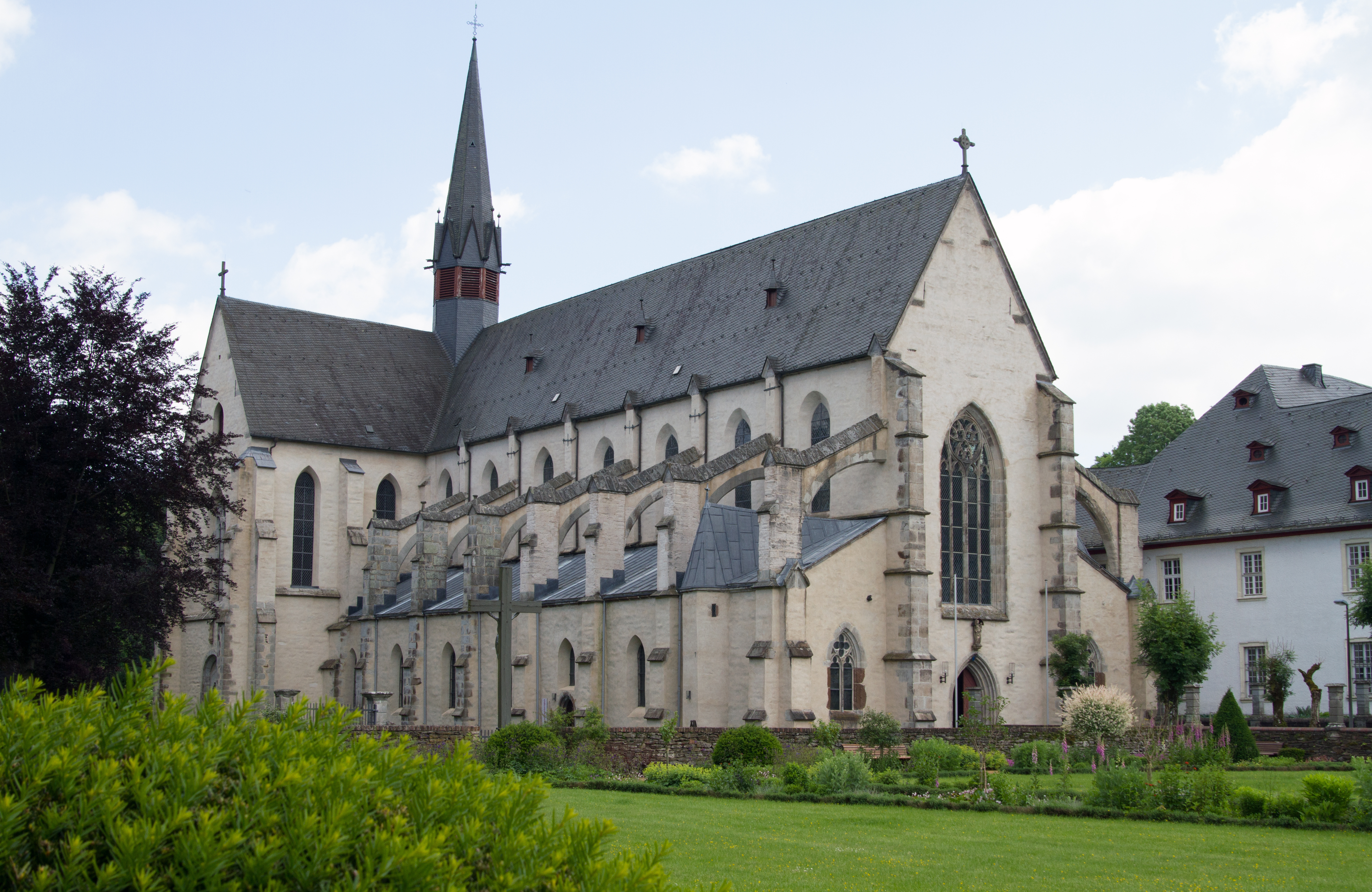
Exterior of the church

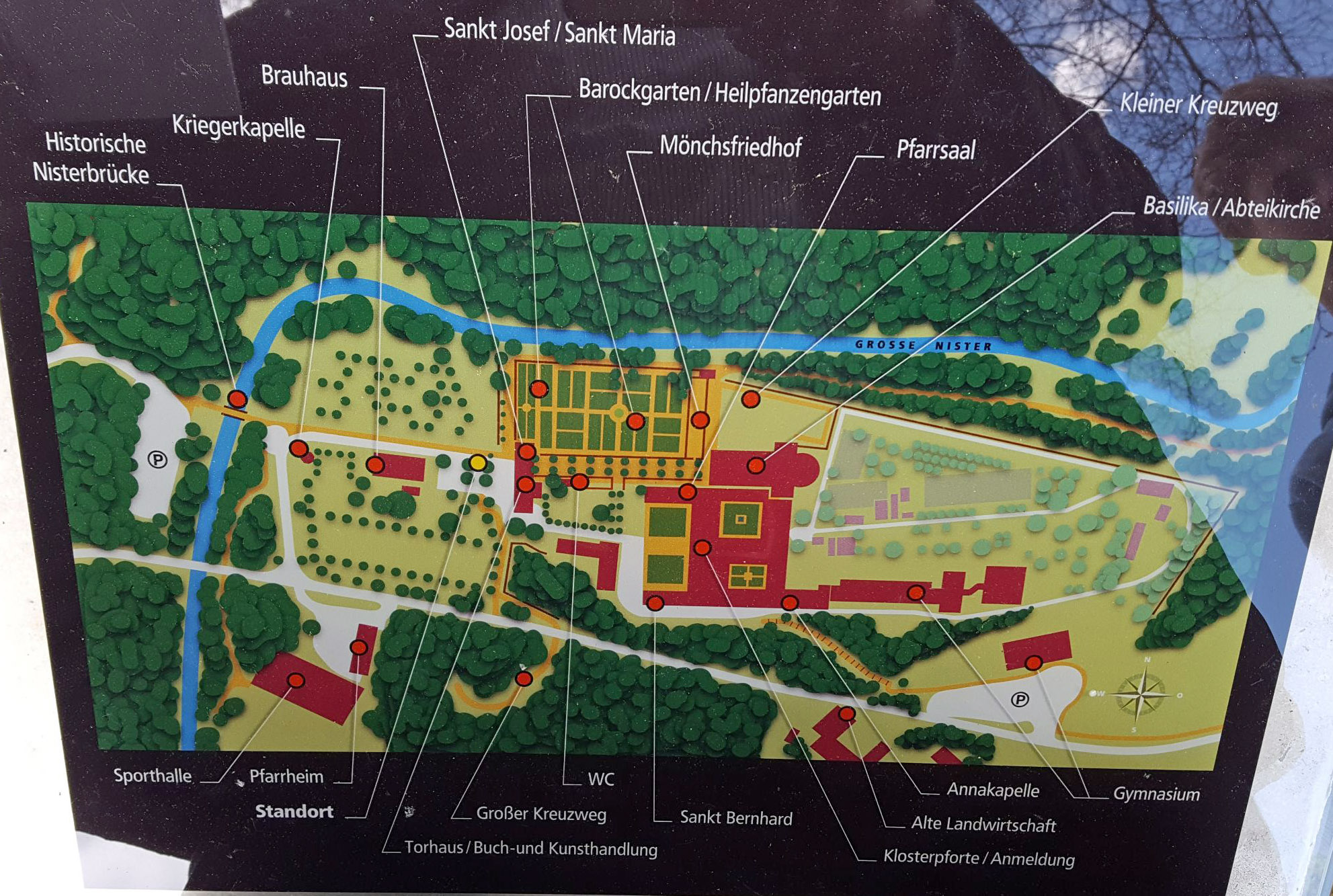
Map of the Marienstatt Abbey plot

The abbey was established by Heisterbach Abbey, which was created by Himmerod Abbey, which in turn was founded from Clairvaux Abbey in 1134, in a direct succession. In 1212, it was first founded in Neunkhausen, made possible by a donation from Eberhard of Arenberg and his wife Adelheid von Molsberg. The site was abandoned because of the climate and soil, and the monastery was transferred to the present location in 1222. According to legend, the abbot had a dream of a hawthorn bush that flowered in winter, which led him to choose the new site. The first church there was consecrated on 27 December 1227 under Conrad, the third abbot. The monastery at the time belonged to the Diocese of Cologne.

From 1476, lay people were permitted to attend services in the abbey church, and in 1485 the pilgrimage day was made the octave of Corpus Christi. From 1561, the Counts of Sayn introduced the Reformation in their territories. In the Thirty Years' War, Sweden claimed the property as Swedish crown land on 3 October 1633, expelling the brothers and vandalizing the premises. Some brothers returned when the Swedes left. However, abbot Johannes Wittig lived with only one brother and one novice there in 1637. After the war, the monastery flourished again, and most present buildings were erected. Under abbot Benedikt Bach, the church was decorated in Baroque style. The old buildings were demolished and replaced from 1735 to 1751 under Petrus Emons.

The monastery served as an infirmary during the War of the First Coalition in 1794/95 and 1796/97. On 19 October 1802, the abbey was dissolved as part of secularisation and was given to Frederick William, Prince of Nassau-Weilburg. The last brothers left in 1803, but Catholic masses were still held. From 1831, masses were officially tolerated by the Nassau government, when the abbey church became the church of a new parish, Marienstatt, saving it from demolition. In 1842, Nassau County bought the buildings back in poor condition, but plans for a workhouse were not carried out. On 18 May 1864, the county sold Marienstatt to the Bishop of Limburg, Peter Joseph Blum, who established a home for neglected boys. It was directed by members of the Congregation of the Holy Spirit. When the order was dissolved during the 1873 Kulturkampf, diocesan priests took over. They were supported by sisters of the Poor Handmaids of Jesus Christ. Eventually, the institution was moved to Kloster Marienhausen in Aulhausen. In 1888, the abbey was bought back by brothers of the Wettingen-Mehrerau Abbey. The abbot (and later Bishop of Limburg) Dominikus Willi cared for a new settlement, now as part of the Mehrerauer Kongregation.

In 1909, abbot Konrad II Kolb built a library and in 1910 opened an Oblatenschule, a school for the preparation of young men for the order. During the Nazi regime, the abbey was almost closed. During World War II, it served again as an infirmary, and as a home for children from Dormagen, senior citizens from Frankfurt am Main, and the Jesuit college Sankt Georgen.

After the war, the school was reopened and expanded into a gymnasium with boarding facility, Privates Gymnasium Marienstatt. The former boarding house is now a guest house, with school rooms in the basement. The church belongs to the state of Rhineland-Palatinate, while the other buildings belong to the Cistercian abbey. In 2015, the parish was merged into a larger parish, Maria Himmelfahrt Hachenburg.

=== Abbots ===
Marienstatt has had a continuous line of abbots since its founding in the early 13th century, interrupted by the abbey's secularization in 1803 and its refounding by monks from Wettingen-Mehrerau Abbey in 1888. Abbot Dominikus Willi, who led the community following its 1888 refounding, was elected Bishop of Limburg in 1898.

Abbot	Years	Notes
Hermann	1167–1223	Also abbot of Heisterbach and Himmerod abbeys
Ulrich	1223	
Konrad I	1223–1227	
Heinrich I	1228–1235	
Kuno	1235–1245	
Petrus I	1246–1247	
Wilhelm I	1247–1255	
Johannes I	1255–1258	
Dietrich I	1258–1289	
Nikolaus	1289–1298	
Wigand von Greifenstein	1298–1338	
Dietrich II	1338–1351	
Albert	1351–1365	
Enolph	1365–1366	
Dietrich III	1366–1374	
Johannes II	1374–1380	
Bernhard I von Mudersbach	1381–1391	
Heinrich II von Köln	1391–1404	
Dietrich IV von Ingelbach	1404–1409	
Rorich Schappelier	1409–1425	
Wilhelm II von Köln	1425–1428	
Bruno von Köln	1428–1459	
Godert I von Köln	1459–1462	
Friedrich Scharnekell	1457–1490	As dated by Germania Sacra; this overlaps the terms of the preceding and following abbots.
Johannes III von Flach von Westerburg	1490–1514	
Tilmann Raßelbank	1514–1519	
Heinrich III von Cleeberg	1519–1542	
Petrus II von Wenden	1542–1558	
Dietrich V von Birnbach	1558–1559	
Petrus III von Köln (gen. von Herchenhelden)	1560–1563	
Adam von Seelbach	1563–1565	
Johannes IV von Wenden	1565–1576	
Gottfried II von Drolshagen	1576–1586	
Philipp Seiler (gen. Funarius)	1586–1623	
Adolf Stroitz	1623–1633	
Johannes V Weiler	1633–1636	
Michael Leyendecker	1636	
Johannes VI Wittig	1636–1658	
Johannes VII Caspar Pflüger	1658–1688	
Benedikt Johannes Bach	1688–1720	
Alberich Bergh	1720–1735	
Petrus IV Emons	1735–1751	
Bernhard II Colonia	1734–1770	As dated by Germania Sacra; this overlaps the preceding abbot's term.
Edmund Leser	1770–1784	
Joseph Christian Frosch	1784–1802	Last abbot before secularization
Dominikus I Conrad	1740–1803	Also Provisor of Kerpen and Prior of Drolshagen
— Abbey dissolved 1802; refounded from Wettingen-Mehrerau Abbey 1888 —
Dominikus Willi	1889–1898	Elected Bishop of Limburg in 1898; served until his death in 1913
Konrad II Kolb	1898–1918	
Eberhard Hoffmann	1918–1936	
Idesbald Eicheler	1936–1971	
Thomas Denter	1971–2006	
Andreas Range	2006–2022	Retired on reaching the mandatory age of 75
(Prior-administrators)	2022–2025	Interim leadership pending a new election
Ignatius Fritsch	2025–present	

=== Allegations concerning the former boarding school ===
In 2010, a former student of the abbey's boarding school, Arno Benner, spoke to the regional newspaper Rhein-Zeitung about his experience there, describing humiliating treatment and characterizing the school's atmosphere as having "fascistoid" (authoritarian, oppressive) features. Benner said he was not seeking retribution but felt the monastic community had never openly reckoned with this period of its history.

In 2024, regional historian Uli Jungbluth published two books, drawing on the recollections of former boarding-school students, describing conditions at the school between 1947 and 1954. Coverage in the Siegener Zeitung summarized the accounts as describing oppression, psychological terror, mistreatment, and harsh disciplinary methods directed at children, and noted that Benner contributed commentary to the project.

== Church organ ==
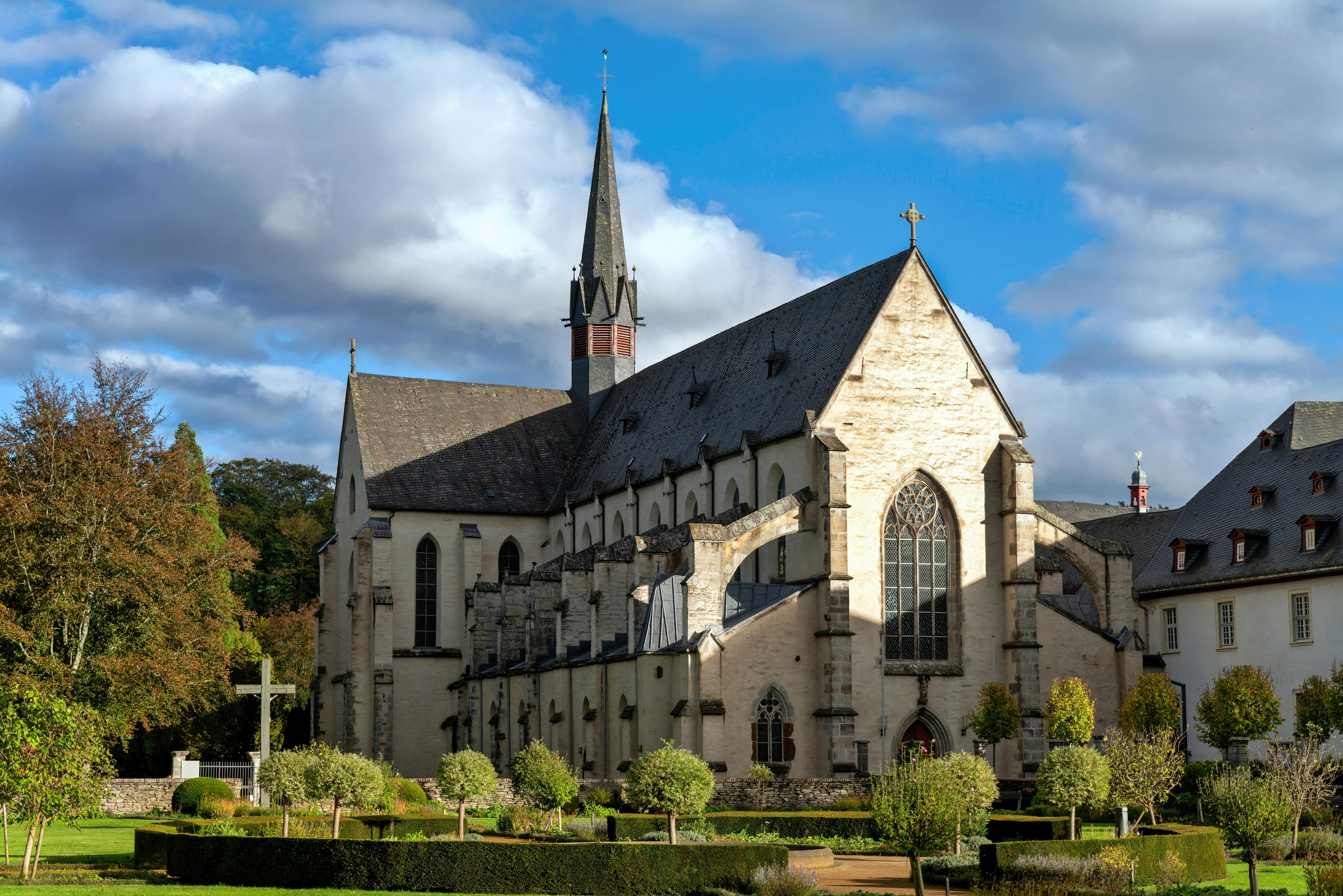
The abbey church

In the 16th century, the church had an organ installed in a Schwalbennest on the north wall. At the end of the 18th century, a large organ was on a balcony in front of the west window. In 1854, Daniel Raßmann from Möttau replaced it with an instrument with 16 stops on two manuals and pedal, reusing some material from the former instrument. The organ and the balcony were demolished in 1941 when the church was restored.

A choir organ served the chorale singing from 1912, with 45 stops. During the restoration, it was relocated to the parish hall. In 1950, Anton Feith from Paderborn used material from this organ to build a new instrument. It was sold to the parish St. Peter (Köln-Neuehrenfeld) in 1964, while the abbey church used a small rented organ.

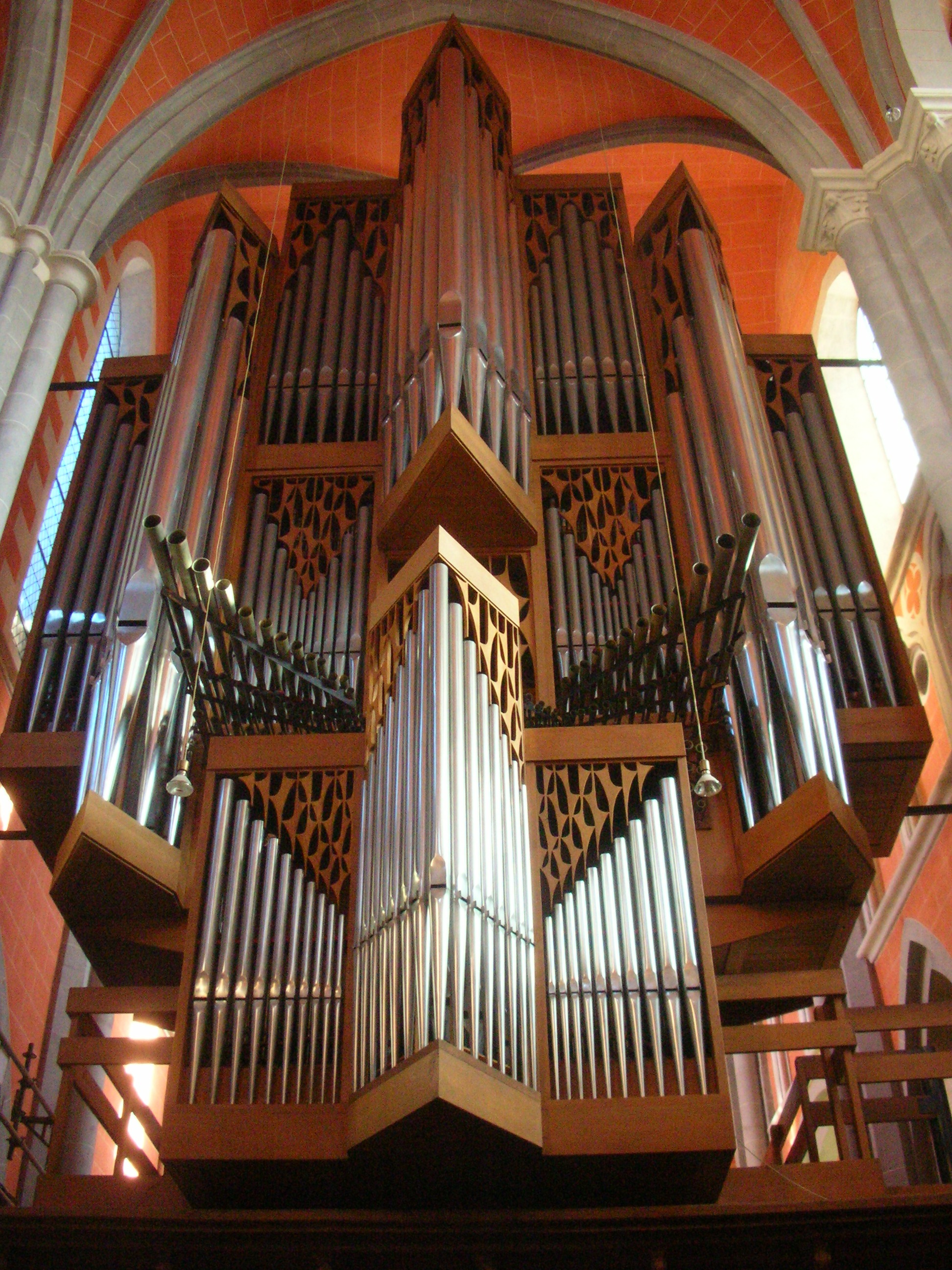
Rieger organ

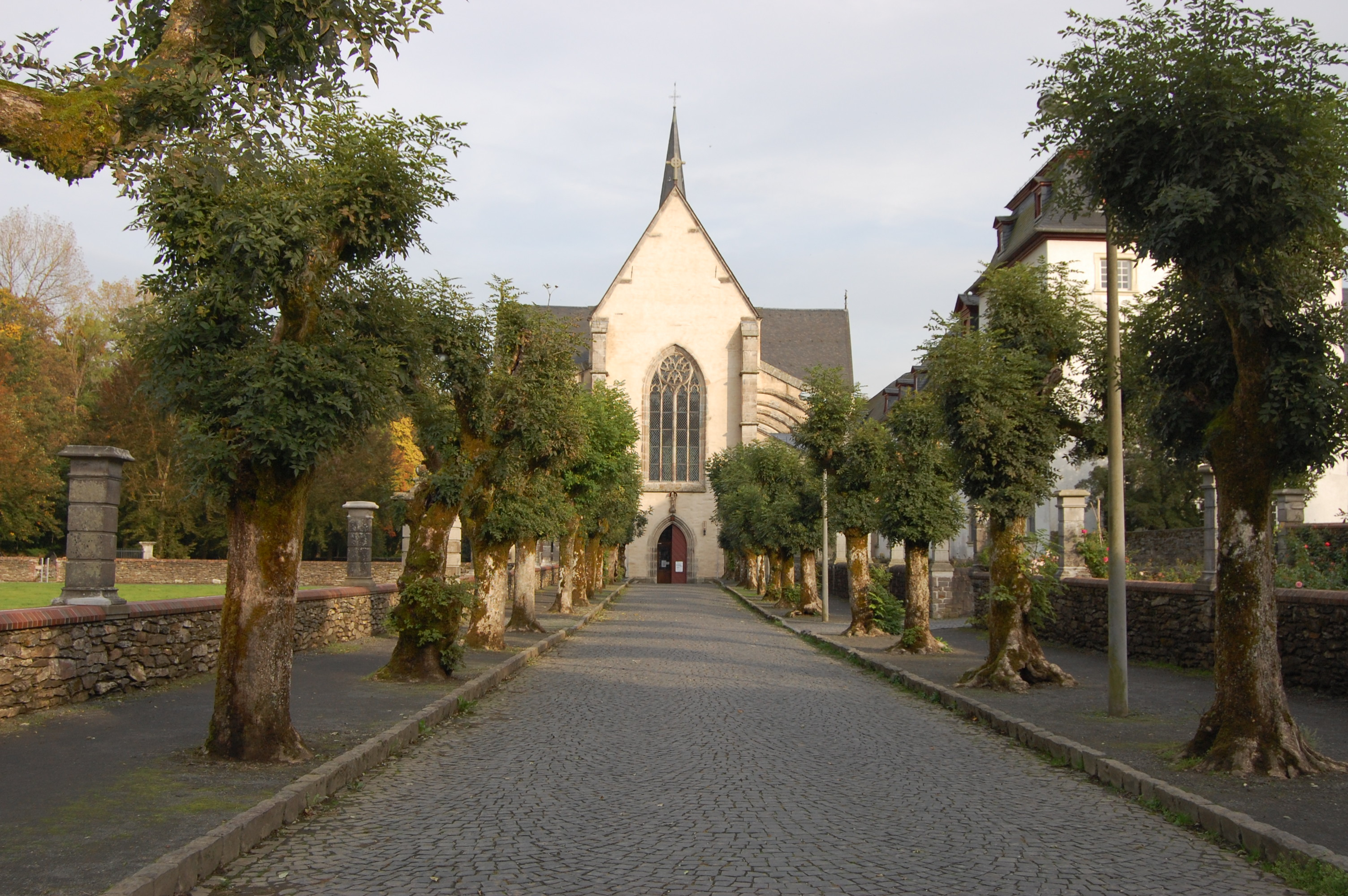
The avenue of Marienstatt, ahead the Abbey church, left side the garden, right side the art and book store

The present organ was built from 1969 to 1970 by Franz Rieger. The organ features the only authentic Spanische Trompete outside Spain, dating back to 1732. The organ was expanded in 2006 and 2007 by Orgelbau Romanus Seifert & Sohn from Kevelaer. In 2015, the organ was expanded by three stops. It now has 67 stops (more than 5,000 pipes) on four manuals and pedal, the largest organ in the region.

== Pilgrims ==
Marienstatt is a known place for pilgrim tours, also the Marienwanderweg connects Marienstatt Abbey to the former Franciscan monastery Kloster Marienthal in Seelbach bei Hamm near Altenkirchen.

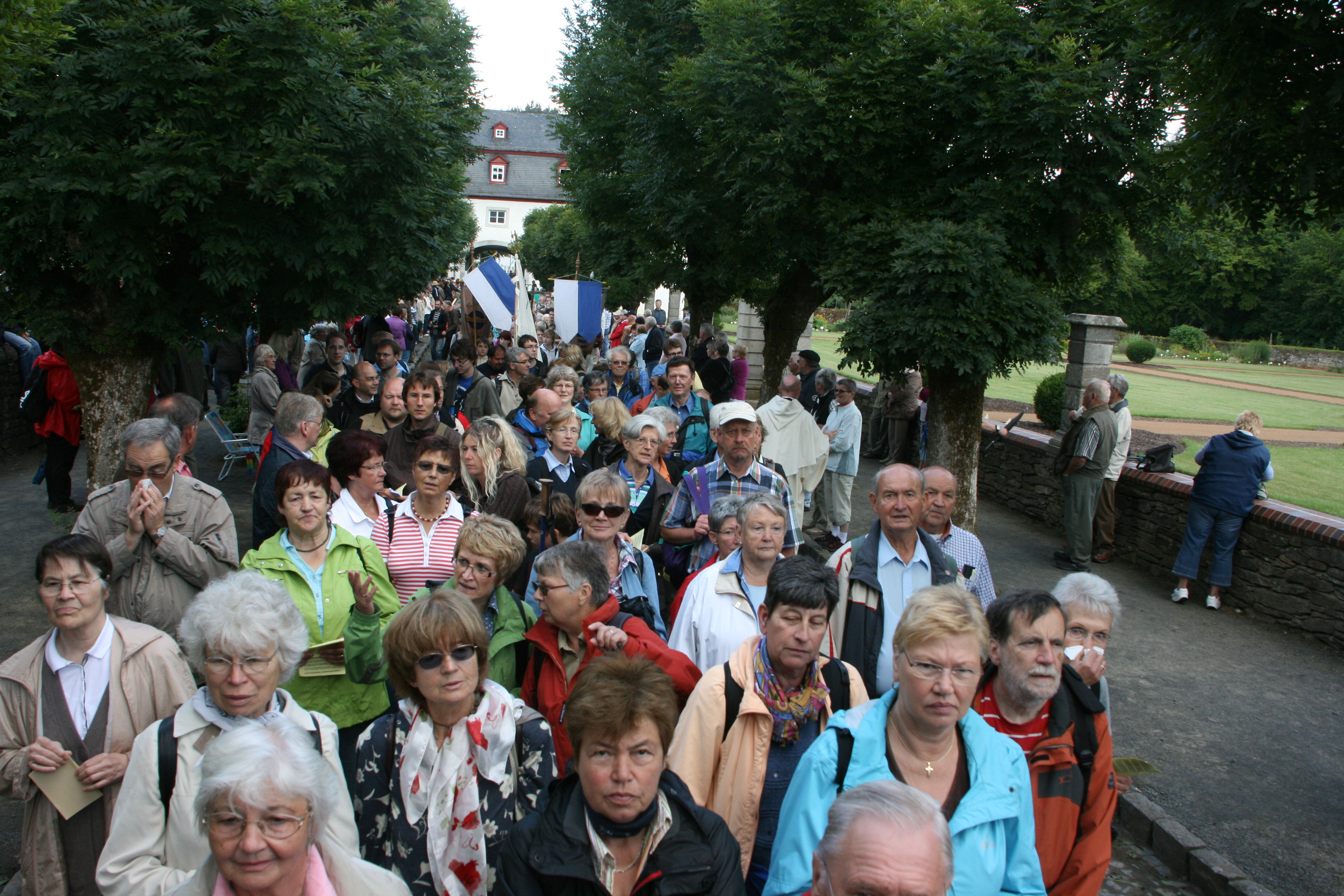
Pilgrims arriving

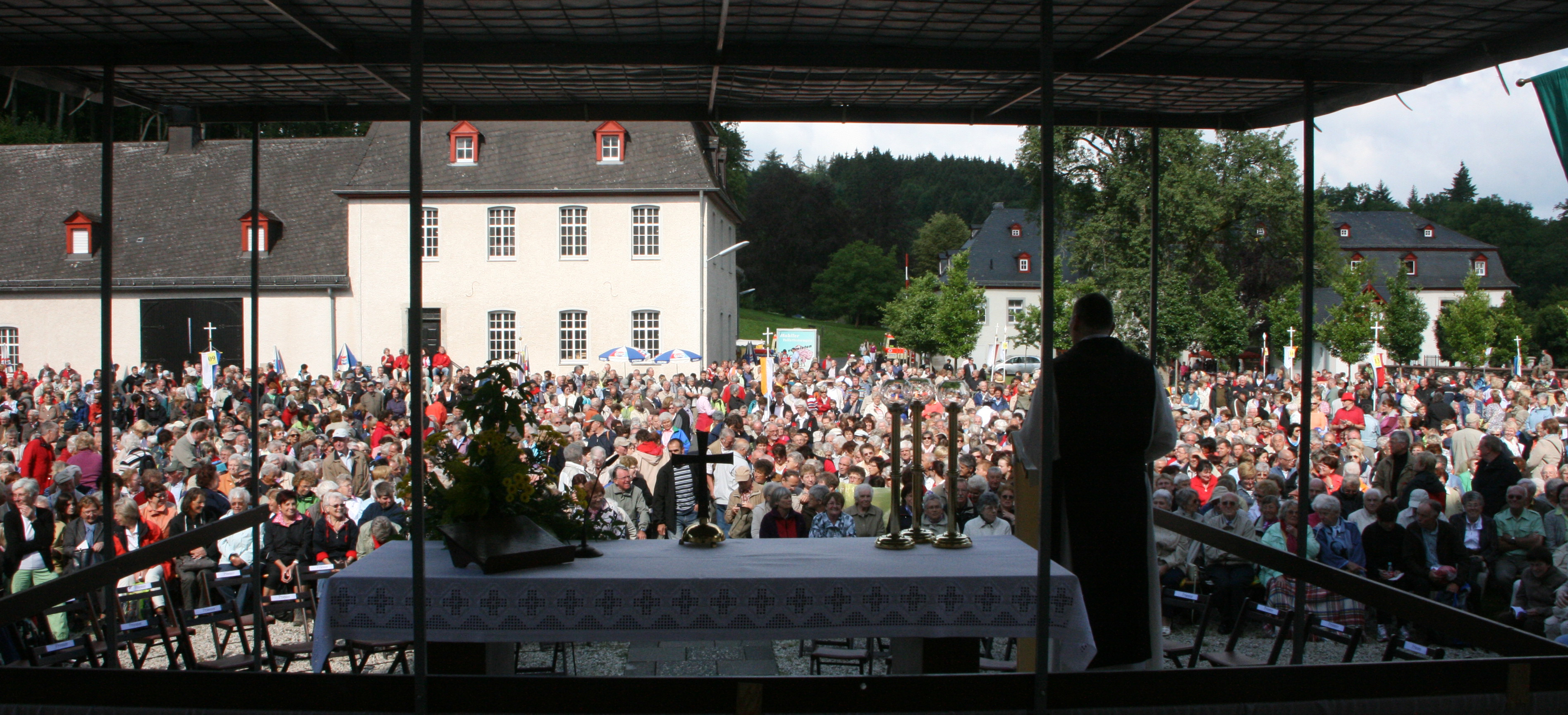
Pilgrimage

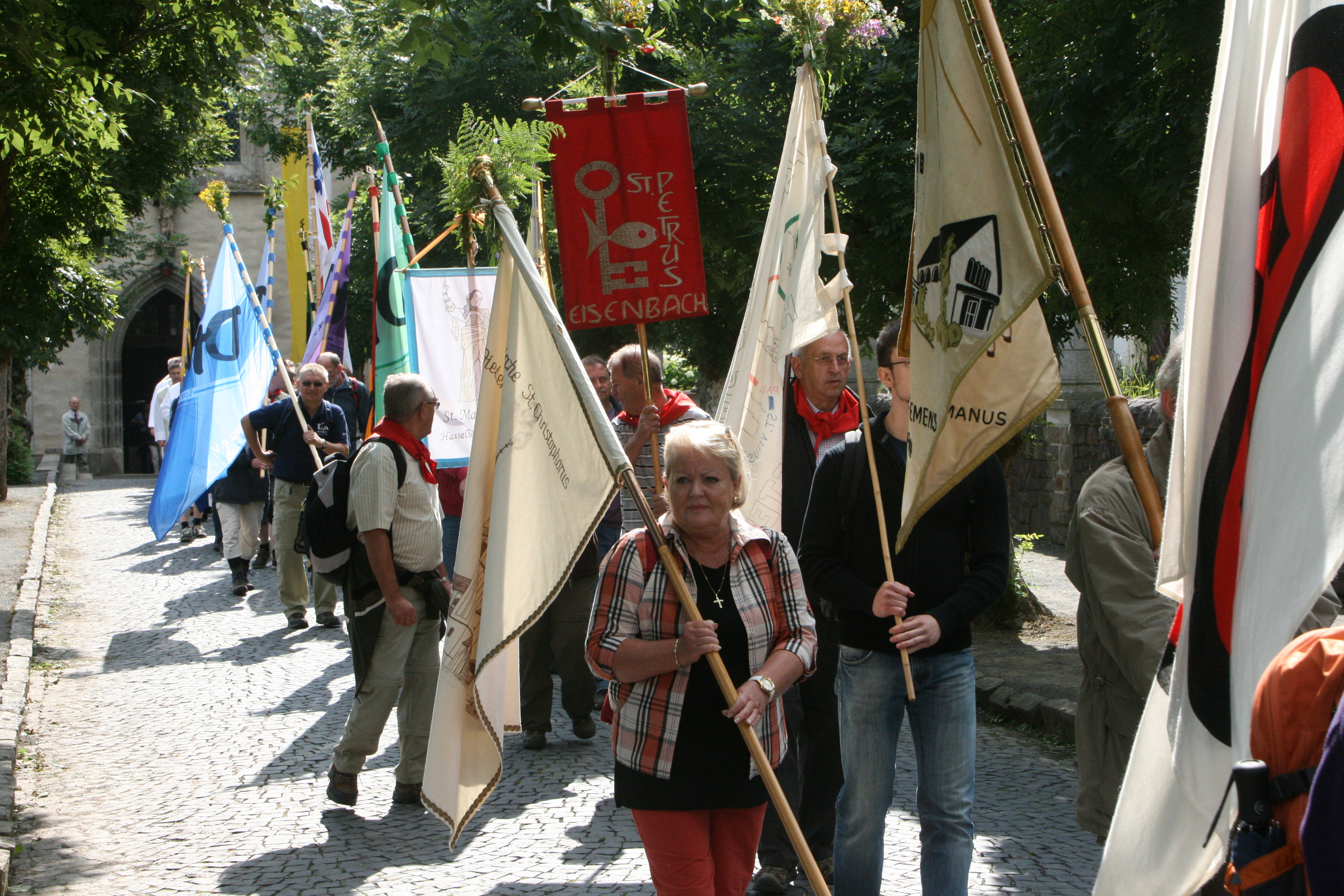
Pilgrims with flags

== Amenities ==
=== Kunst- und Buchhandlung ===
The arts and books store, which is located at the avenue sells local products as well as books about the Cisterciens and the abbey.

=== Garden ===
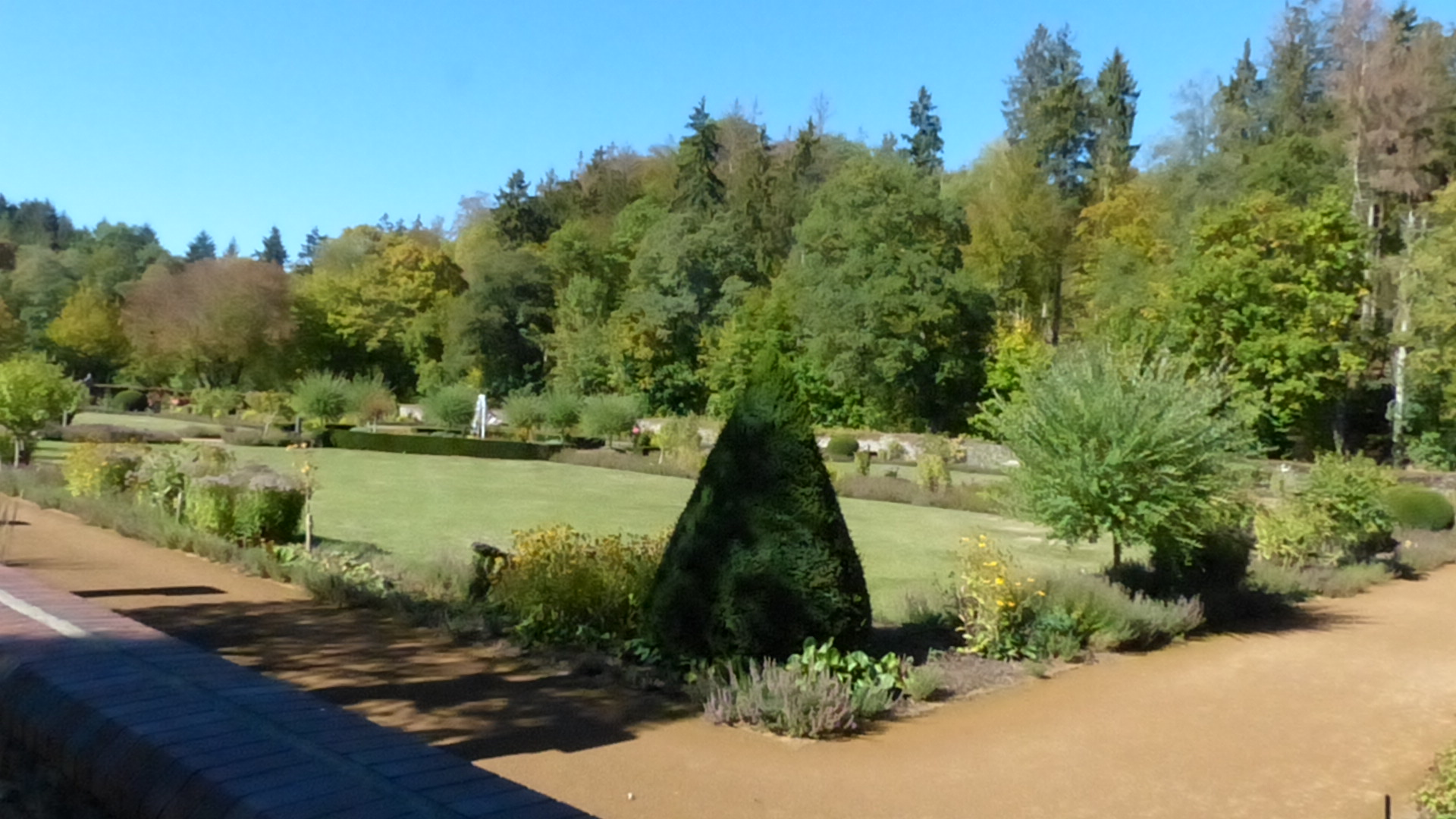
Klostergarten, section Barockgarten

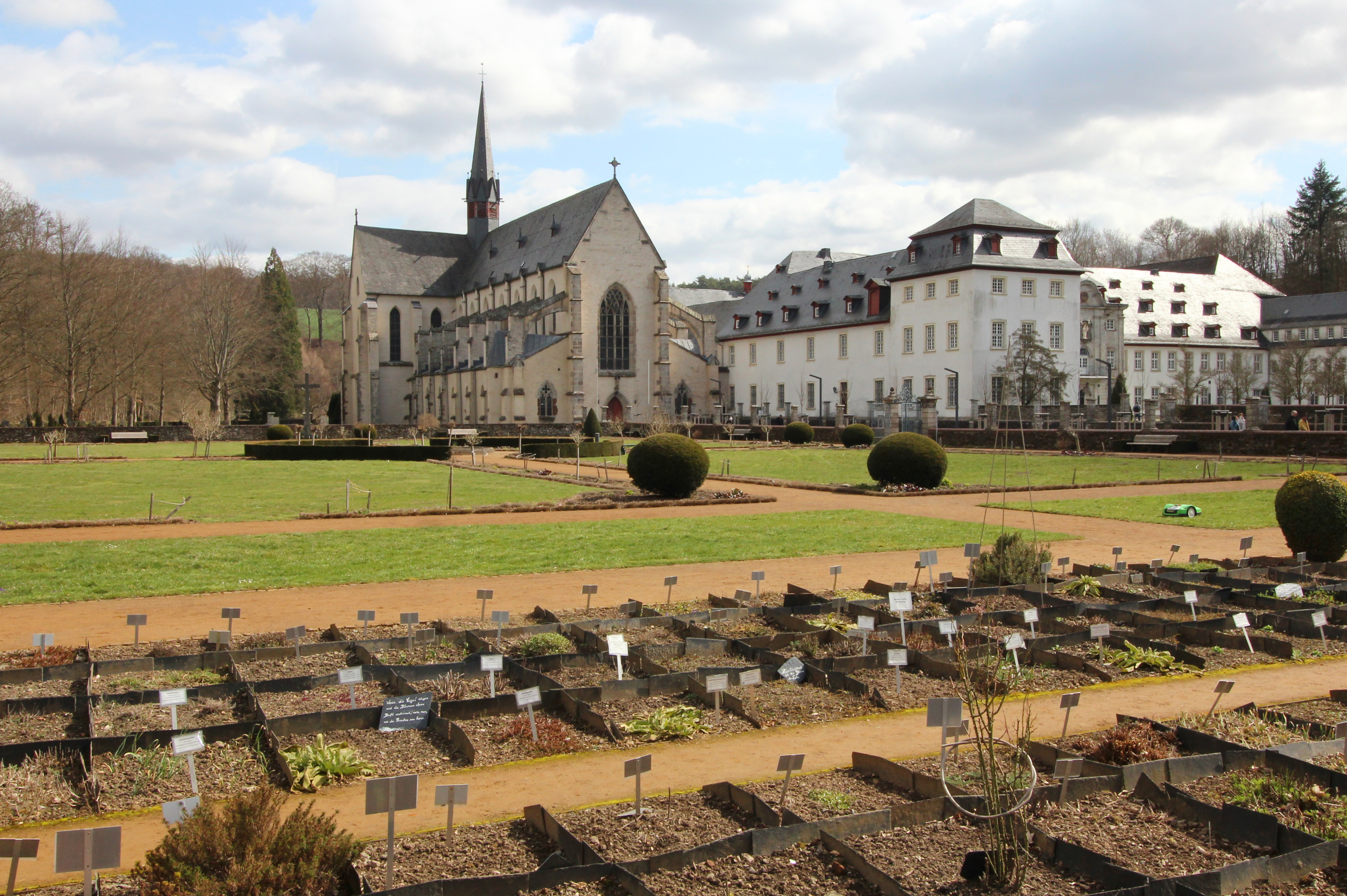
Klostergarten, section Heilpflanzengarten

This garden is a place of recreation as well as herb production. The garden is of two sections, Barockgarten is the section that is for taking rest, it should light the minimalism lifestyle of the Cisterciens monks, it includes flowers and plants as well as a fountain, it has been reconstruated in 2010 and 2011. The monastery wall borders the Barockgarten, it is made by nature stone, many wild, not common plants have settled down on it. The gardens section Heilpflanzengarten is for production of herbs that have a health supporting affect.

=== Library ===
A public library nowadays is located in the main school building, which was constructed in 1910. It houses about 112,700 books, with about 21,500 of them protected as antiquary, historic property since 2017. Before that, the Marienstatt library was located in two other places on the grounds of Marienstatt.

=== Chapels ===
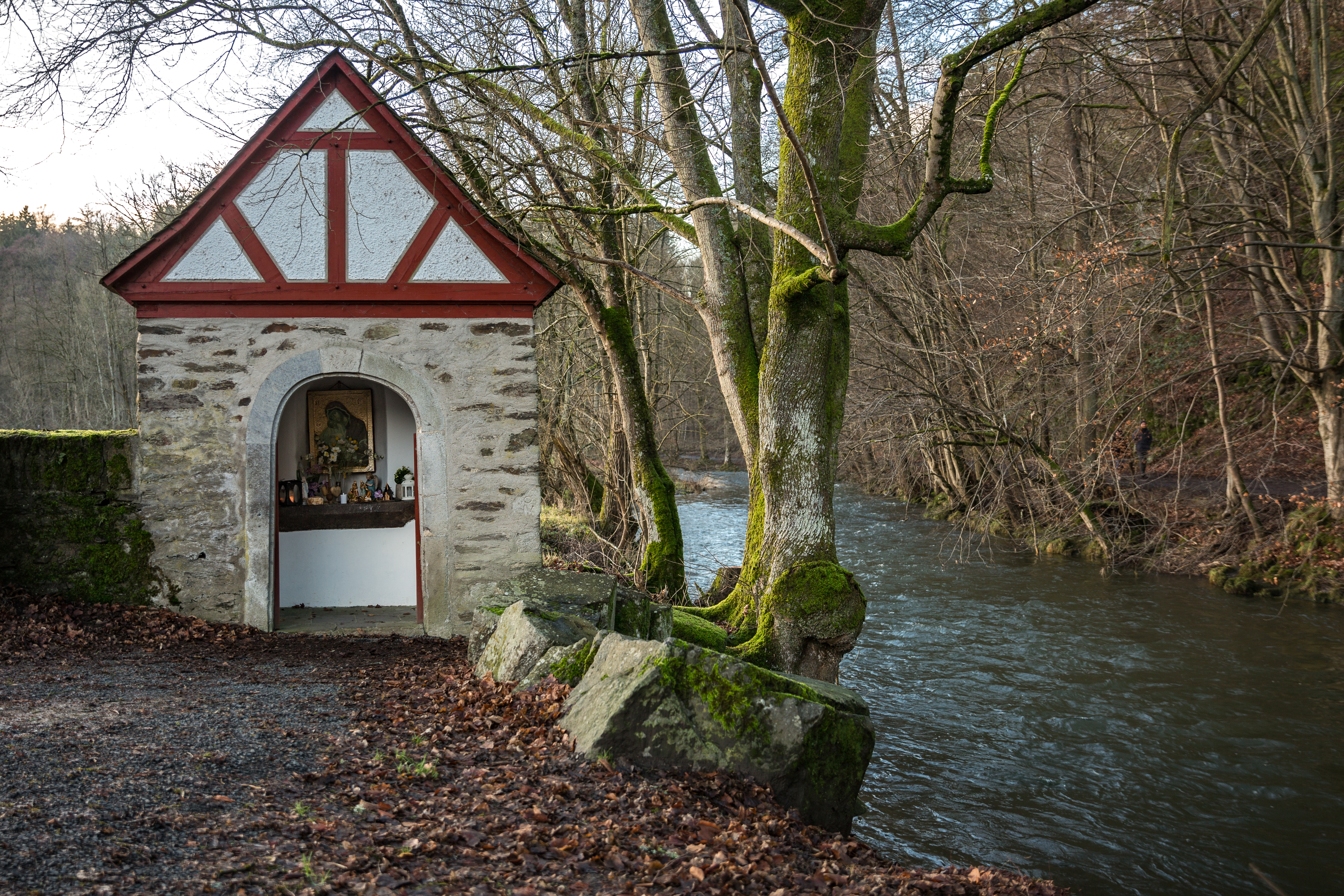
Marien chapel beside the Nister river

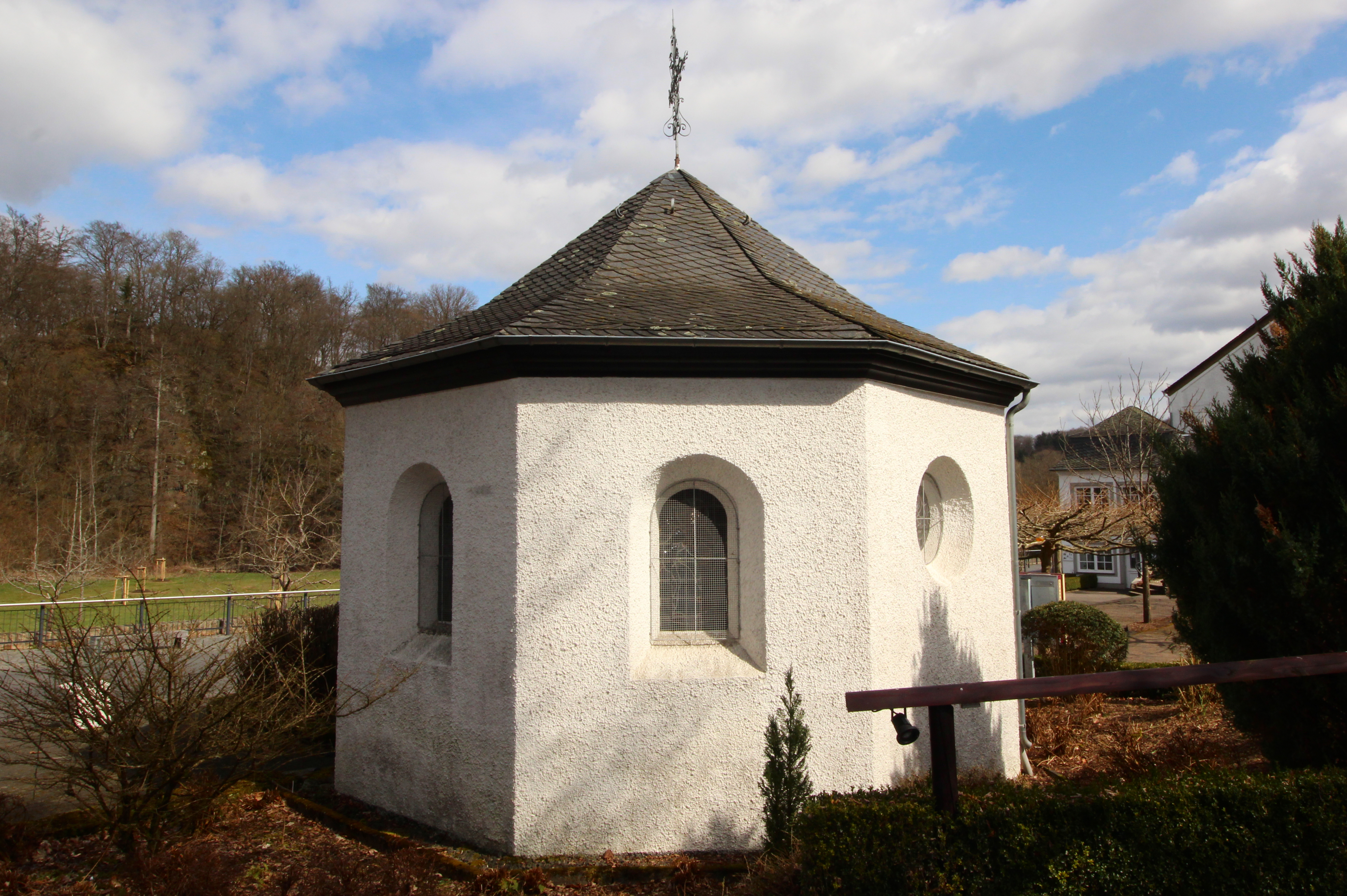
Krieger Kapelle

Beside the church, three chapels are located on the grounds, Marienkapelle and Kriegerkapelle, which are permanent accessible as well as Annakapelle, which is located within the buildings and used by the Abbey, school or groups for events, it has space for approximately 200 people.

=== School ===
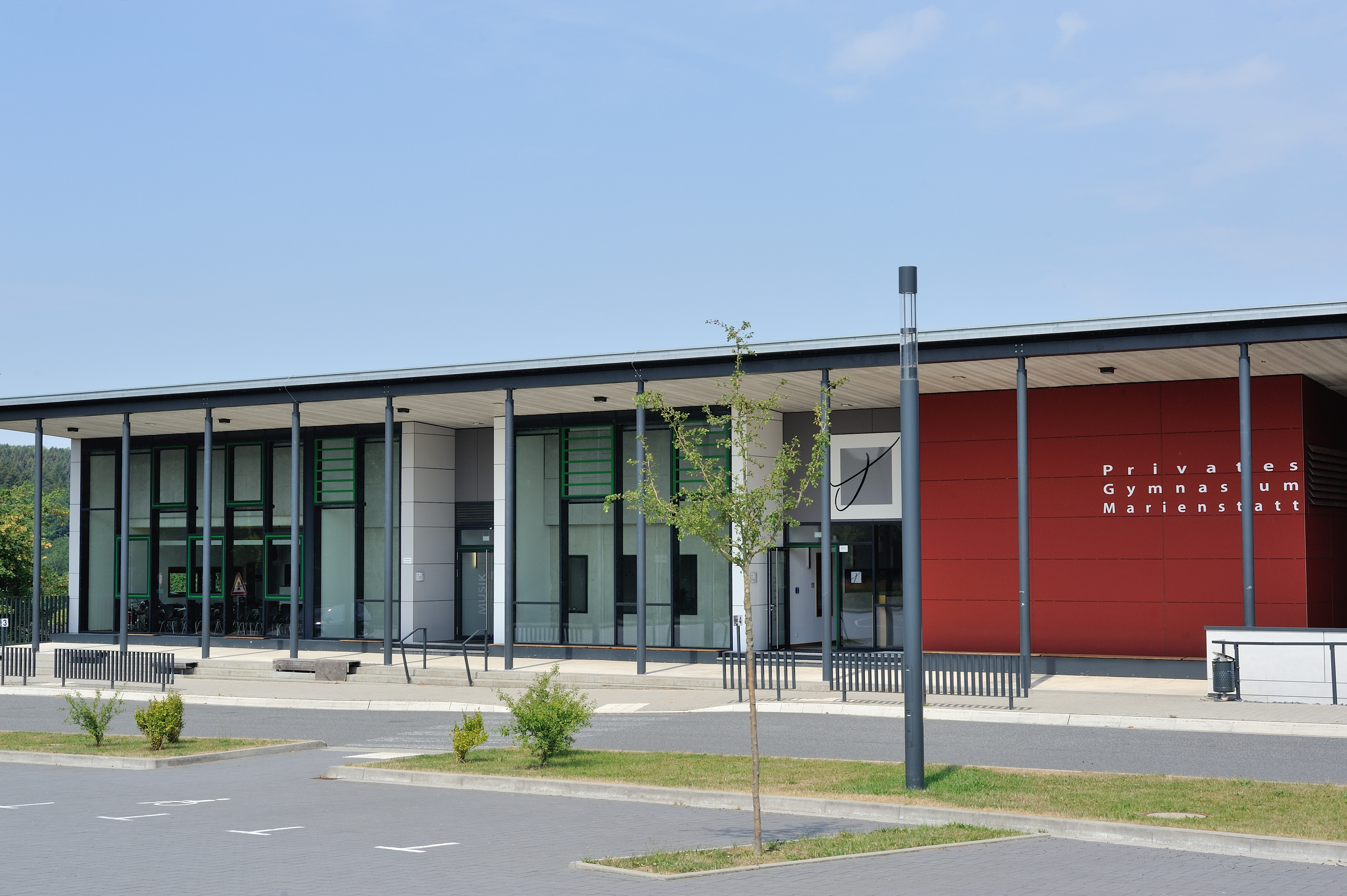
Private school of Marienstatt Abbey

A private school is located on the grounds of Marienstatt Abbey.

=== Guest house ===
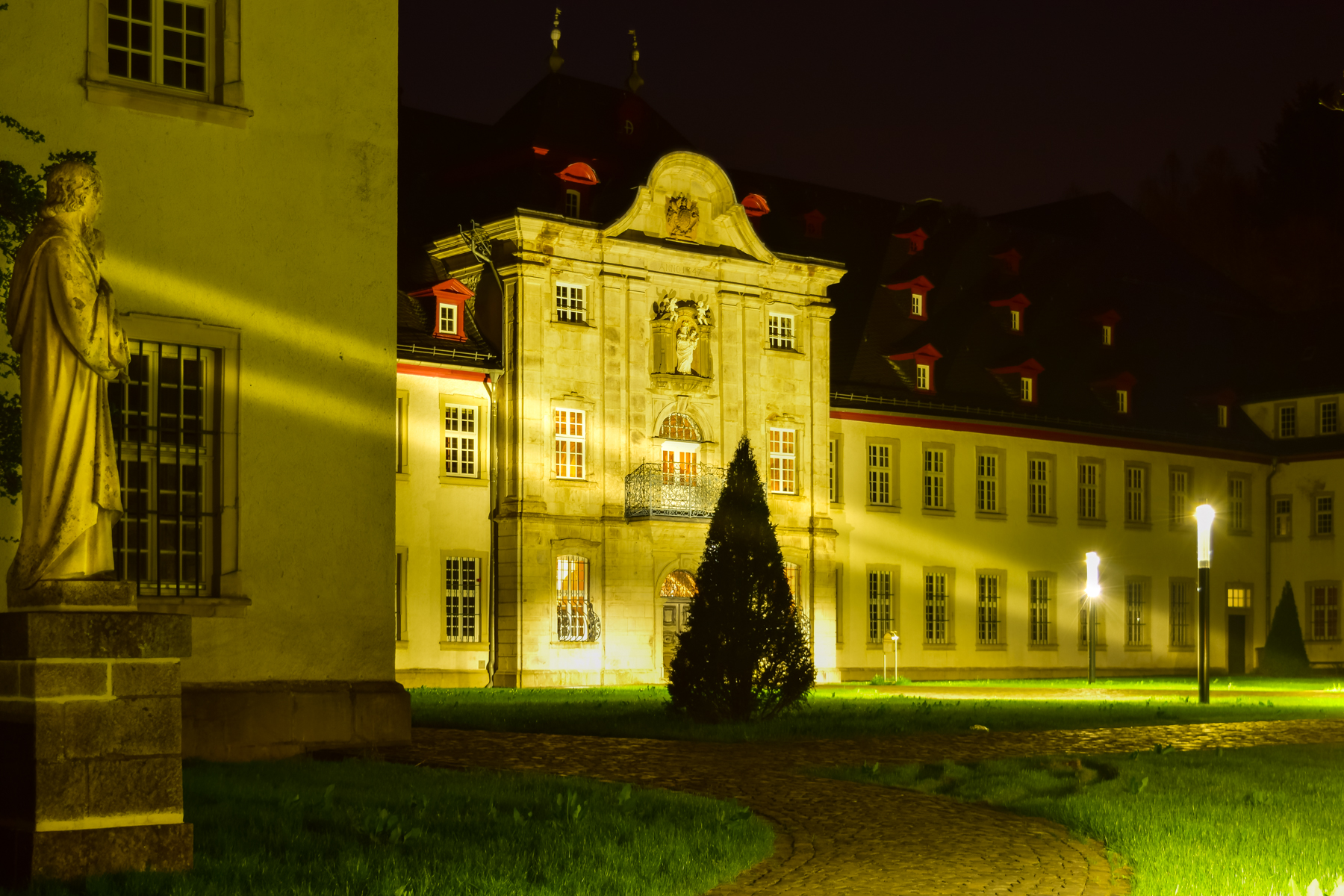
Marienstatt, monastery building, which includes the guest house and the monks residence

The guest house is located in the main building.

=== Brauhaus ===
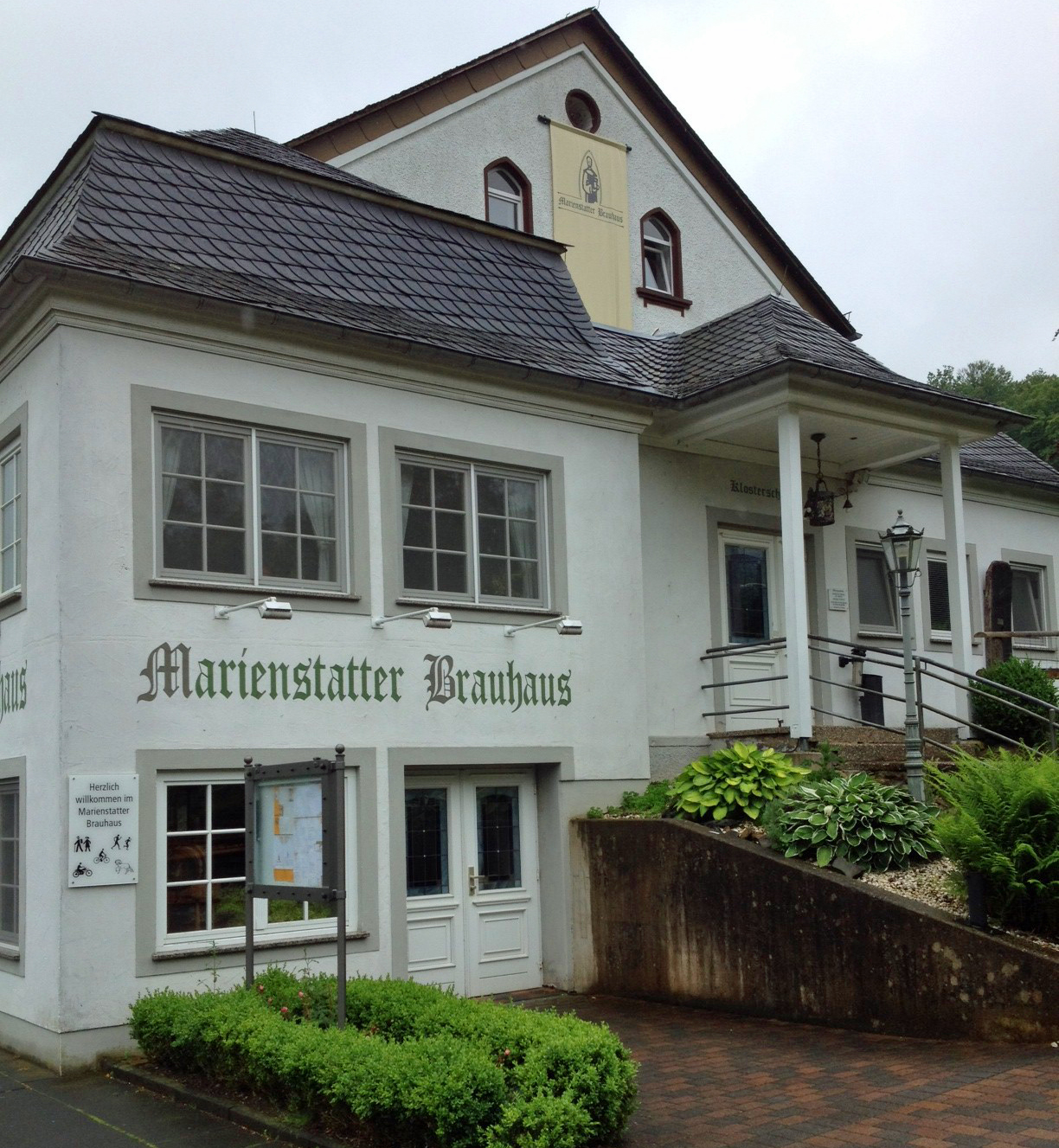
Altes Brauhaus Marienstatt, restaurant and brewery of Marienstätter

The brewery of Marienstatt produces their own beer, called Marienstätter and hosts a restaurant with guest garden.

=== Seminar rooms ===
Marienstatt Abbey has seminar rooms available, most common seminar room is St. Bernhard.

=== Cemetery ===
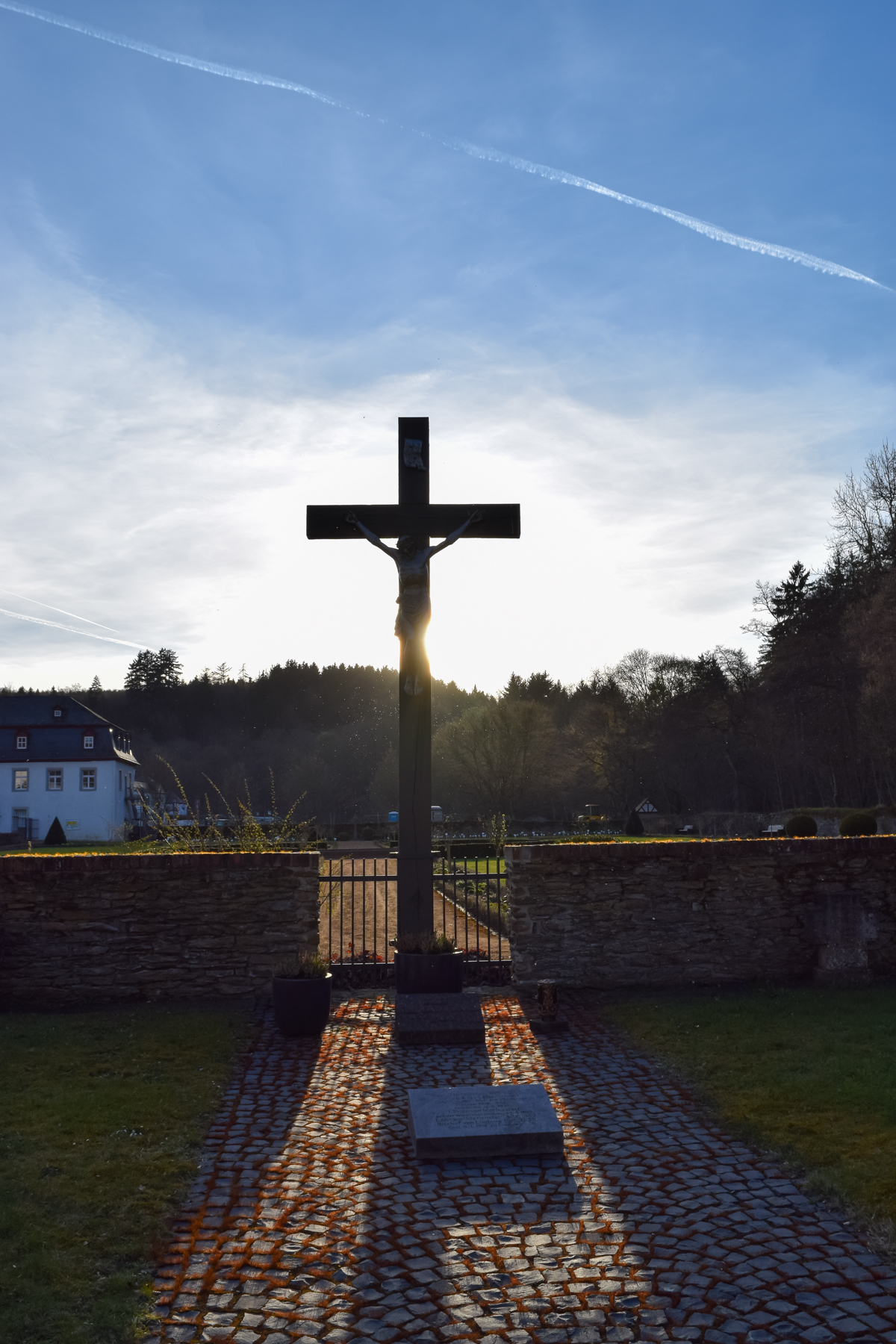
Cross on the Abbey's cemetery

The Abbey has its own cemetery which is for the monks that have passed away.

=== Food production ===
The monastery used to have its own farm on which food has been produced, but it has been closed since 1971.

== Forum ==
The Forum Abtei Marienstatt e. V. is an officially registered, volunteer-based interest group of people that have the goal to support and conserve the abbey, which is a listed cultural heritage and create a dialogue between the abbey and people outside.

The Forum Abtei Marienstatt e. V. also is organizer of public podcasts, exhibitions, guided walking tours and excursions to teach about the history of the Cistercians.

== Freundeskreis ==
The Spiritual Friends' Circle is an initiative of the monks of Marienstatt. It consists of people who feel connected to the monastery and its community and support it chiefly through daily prayer, in particular praying for spiritual vocations for the abbey.

== Musikkreis ==
The Marienstatter Musikkreis is the music group of Marienstatt Abbey that organizes concerts and perform regularly, the leader is Frater Gregor Brandt.

== Infrastructure ==
=== Transport ===
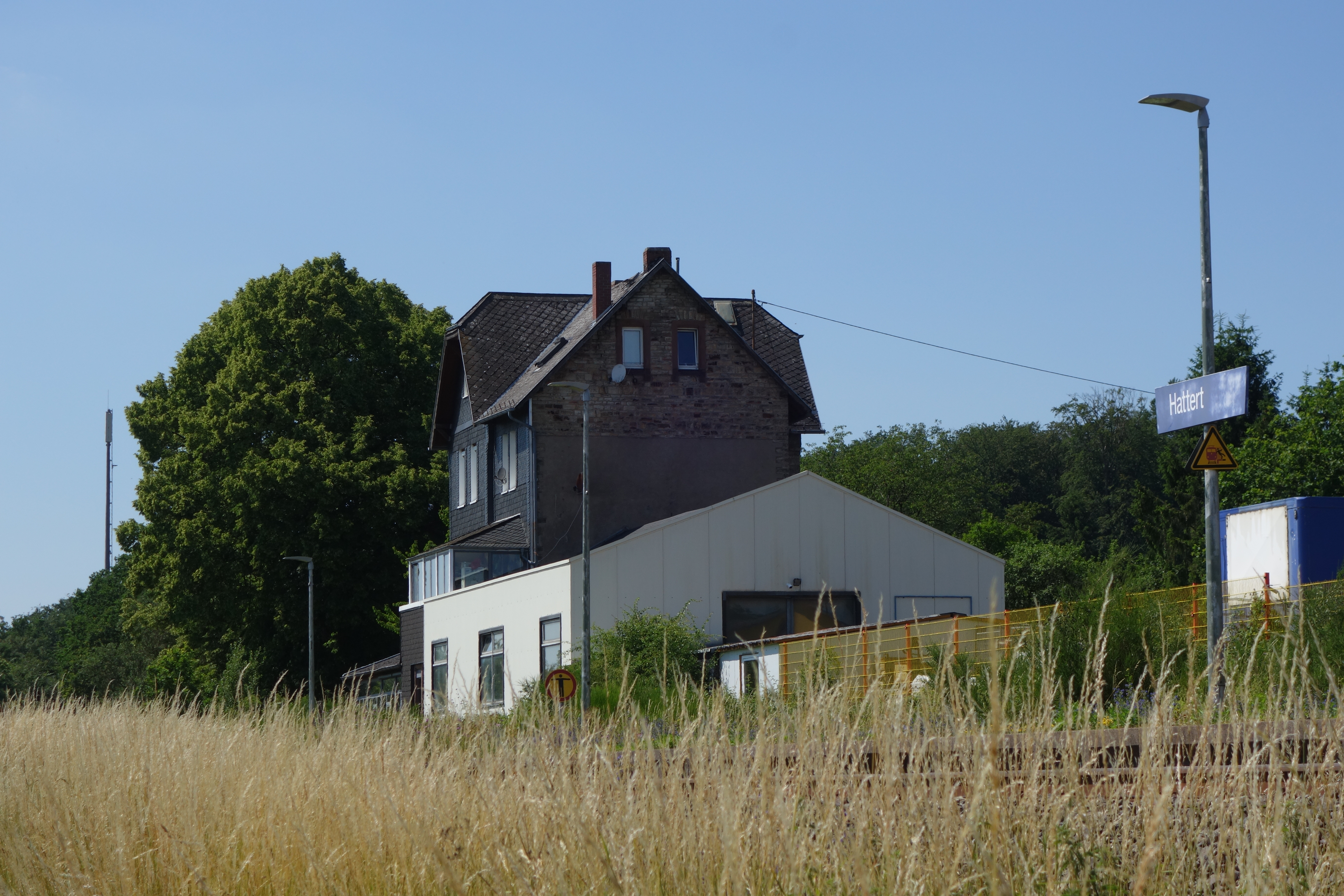
Hattert stop is the nearest accessability to the train service

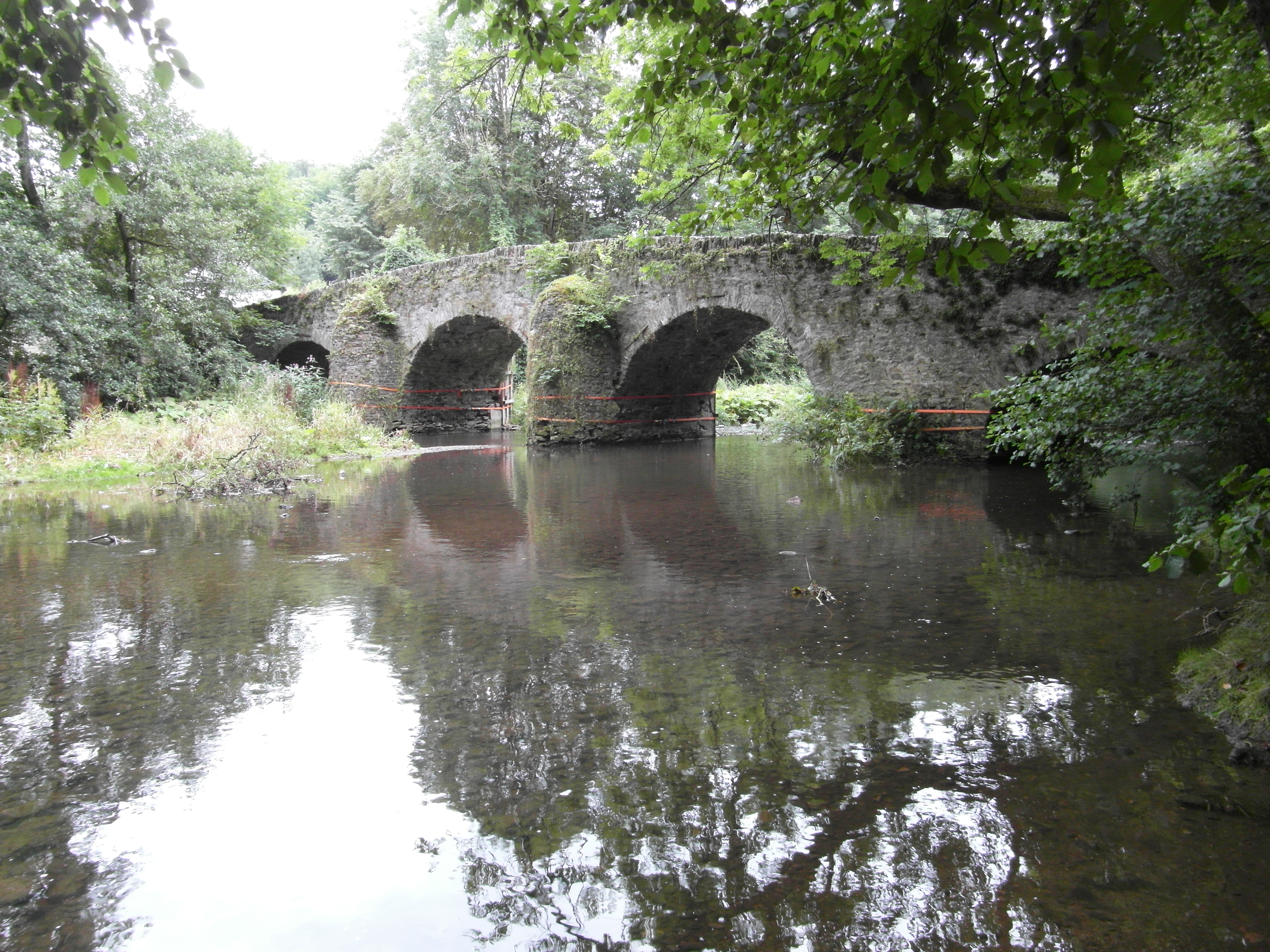
The bridge over the Nister connects the monastery with the walking route to Hattert train stop, parking lot as well as the Marienwanderweg, the walking route to the former Marienthal monastery near Altenkirchen

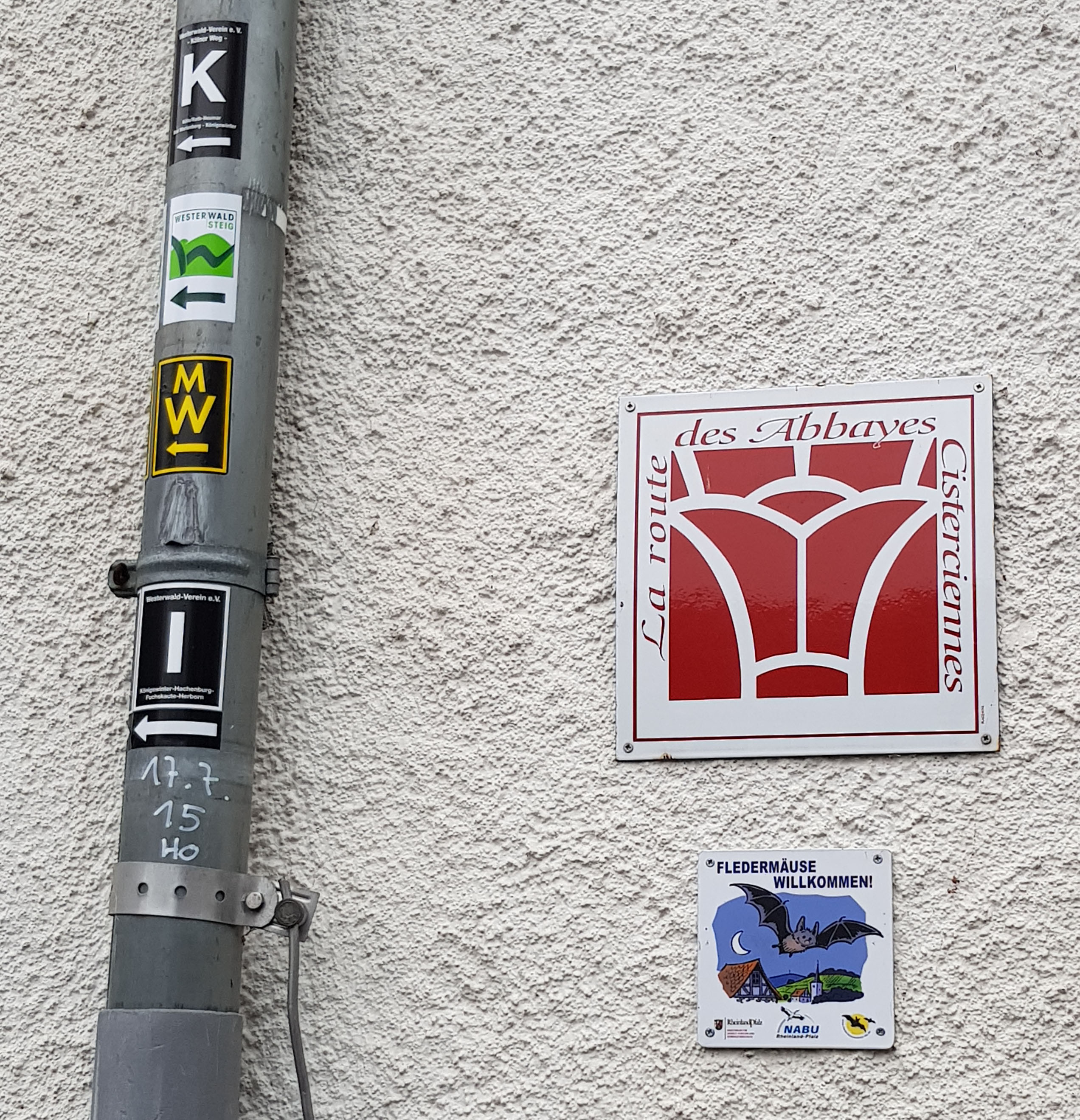
Signs of different long distance walking routes at and close to Marienstatt Abbey like Westerwaldsteig and European Cisterciens route

Marienstatt was, through its former own stop, connected to the Limburg-Altenkirchen railway this line nowadays is served by line number RB90 Westerwald-Sieg-Bahn of DreiLänderBahn, a section of Hessische Landesbahn (HLB) as well as the former Selters-Hachenburg narrow-gauge railway. Since the line from Hachenburg to Selters has been closed, the nearest train stop is Hattert, located next to Müschenbach, where in the past also the narrow-gauge line to Selters (Westerwald) was operating.

Additionally, the local bus lines 415, 270 and 273 serve Marienstatt Abbey.

Marienstatt is located at the Marien hiking trail to Marienthal Friary in Seelbach bei Hamm near Altenkirchen (Westerwald).

Marienstatt is located on the area of the Verkehrsverbund Rhein-Mosel (VRM) (Rhine-Moselle transport association), zone number 453.

The historical bridge, made of rubble stone over the Nister, is also a cultural heritage, first named in 1478, renewed from 1721 to 1734, and was once an important way for the traffic from Cologne to Leipzig. Nowadays, it's only for walkers and cyclers, primarily used to reach Hattert train stop, parking lot or the Marienway to Seelbach-Marienthal.

=== Electricity supply ===
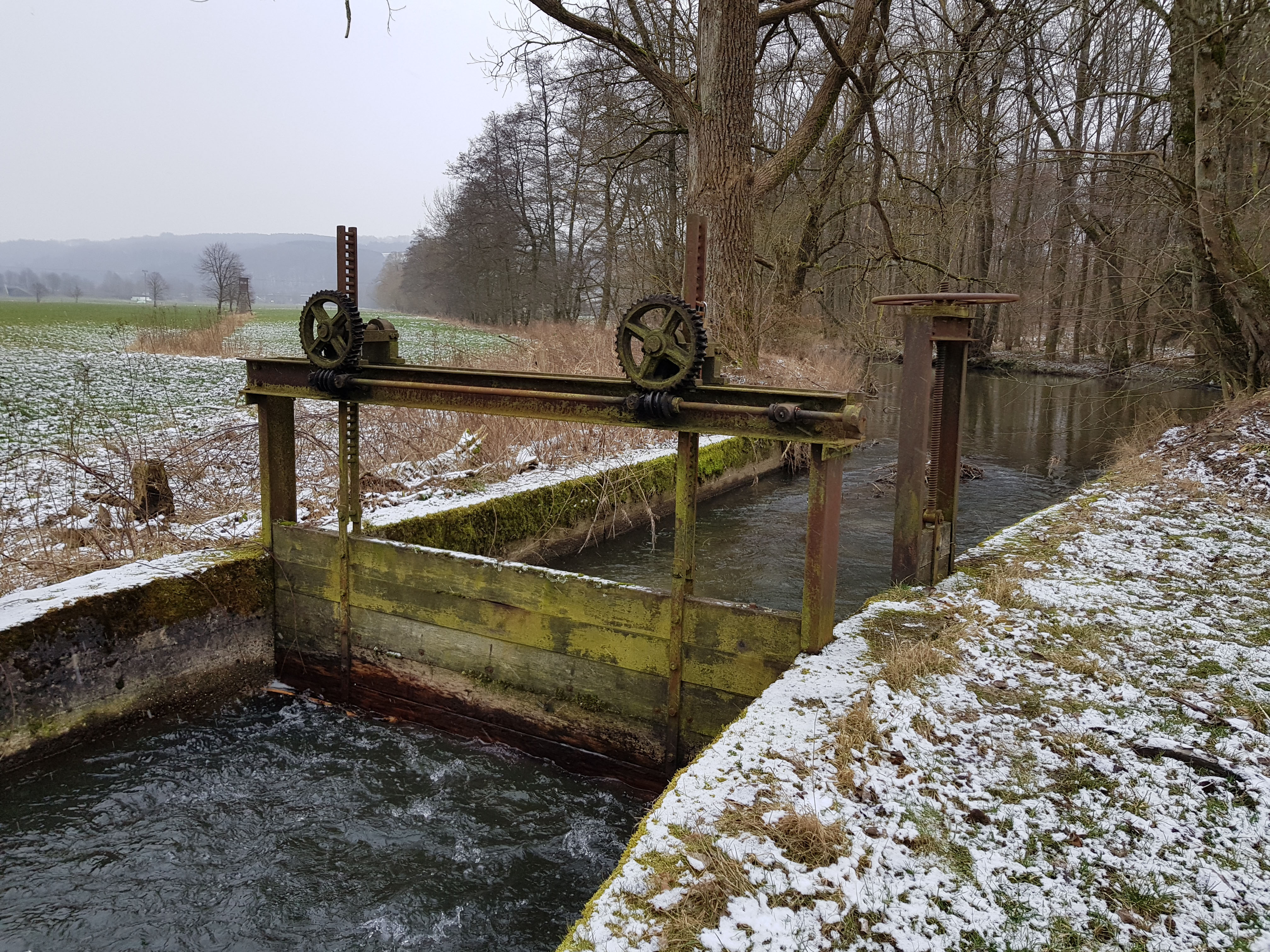
Hydropower in Marienstatt

Because there is an interest in sustainability, the abbey produces its own electricity through solar generators on roofs as well as a Hydropower generator at the Nister River. Producing electricity though wind turbines is not possible due to the location of the abbey in a valley. Additionally, a solar based warming system for water is located of the roofs.

== Regular events ==
The annual Traktorensegnung (tractor blessing) blesses the farming mashines of the surrounding area.

== Literature ==
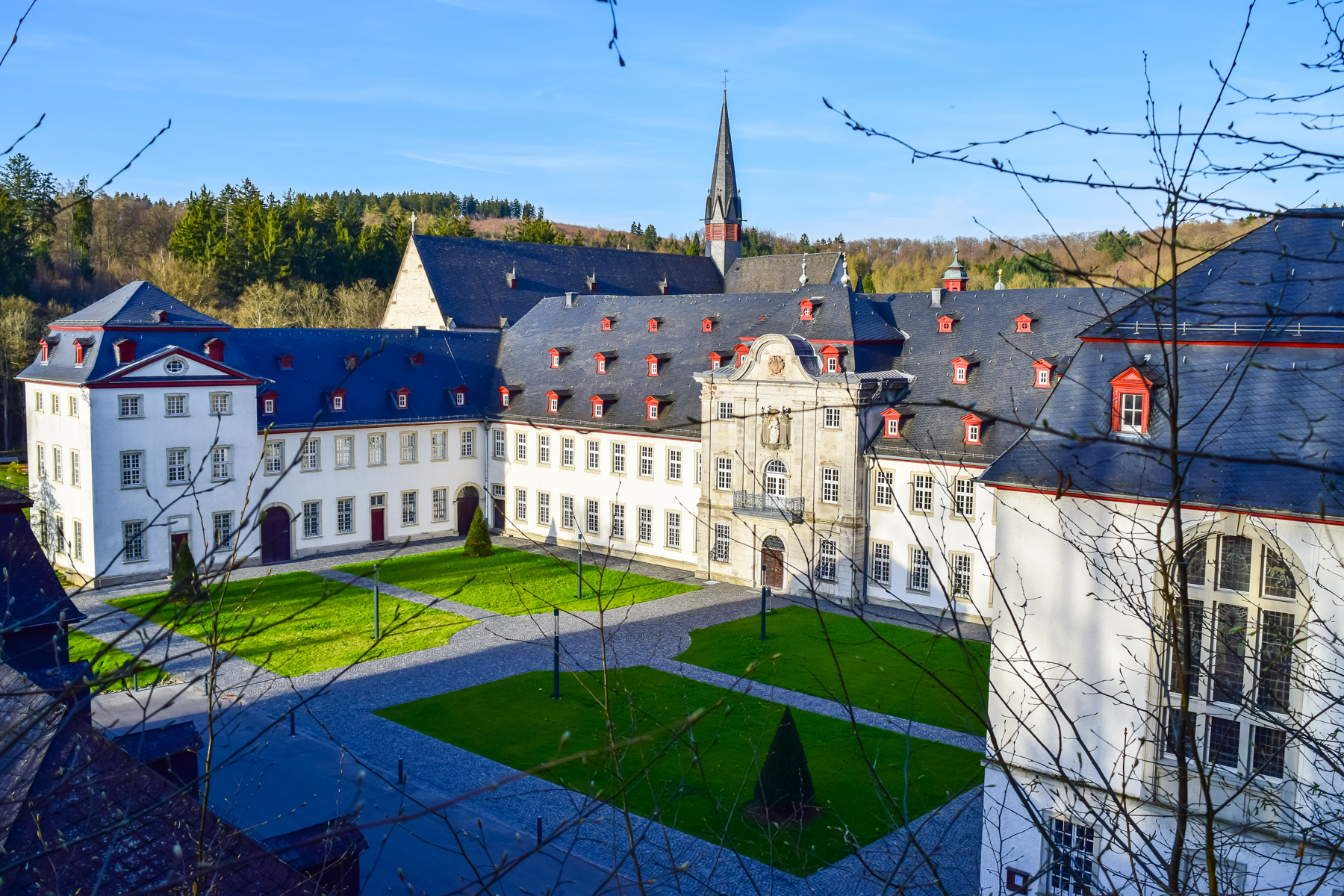
The monastery building

- R. Goerz (ed.): Die Abteikirche zu Marienstatt bei Hachenburg. Wiesbaden 1867. dilibri Rheinland-Pfalz
- Hermann Josef Roth: Die Abtei Marienstatt und die Generalkapitel der Zisterzienser seit 1459. In: Archiv für mittelrheinische Kirchengeschichte. 22, 1970, pp. 93–127.
- Abtei Marienstatt (ed.): 750 Jahre Abteikirche Marienstatt. Buch- und Kunstverlag Abtei Marienstatt, Marienstatt 1977.
- Abtei Marienstatt (ed.): 100 Jahre Wiederbesiedlung der Abtei Marienstatt 1888–1988. Buch- und Kunstverlag Abtei Marienstatt, Marienstatt 1988.
- Doris Fischer: Die Klosterkirche Marienstatt = Denkmalpflege in Rheinland-Pfalz. Forschungsberichte 4. Wernersche Verlagsgesellschaft, Worms 1999. ISBN 3-88462-159-9
- Hillen, Christian (2012). "Sehet, hier ist die Stätte -": Geschichte der Abtei Marienstatt (in German). Böhlau. p. 462. ISBN 978-3-11-046903-5.
- Hermann Josef Roth: Himmerod und Marienstatt. Möglichkeiten eines Vergleichs als methodische Anregung. In: Cistercienser-Chronik. 111, 2, 2004, pp. 205–214, 2 illus., 1 table
- Wilhelm Buschulte: Abtei Marienstatt. Rheinischer Verein für Denkmalpflege und Landschaftsschutz, Cologne 2008, ISBN 978-3-86526-023-9.
- Andreas Lechtape: Kloster Marienstatt. Schnell & Steiner, Regensburg 2005, ISBN 3-7954-1663-9.
- Wolf-Heino Struck: Das Cistercienserkloster Marienstatt (Westerwald) im Mittelalter. Urkundenregesten, Zinsverzeichnisse und Nekrolog. Historische Kommission für Nassau, Wiesbaden 1965, ISBN 978-3-922244-22-6.
- Katharina Kasper. Schriften. Vol. I. Kevelaer 2001, ISBN 3-7666-0323-X (Founder of the Congregation of Poor Handmaids of Jesus Christ).
- Forum Abtei Marienstatt (ed.): Acht Jahrhunderte Abtei Marienstatt. Jubiläum – Äbte – Projekte. Marienstatt 2014. ISBN 978-3-00-042103-7.

=== Films ===
- Virtual flight over the Abbey grounds
- A quiet place: Marienstatt Abbey on YouTube

== See also ==
- List of Christian monasteries in Rhineland-Palatinate
- List of Christian monasteries in Germany
