= Hermann Josef Roth =

German theologian and scientist

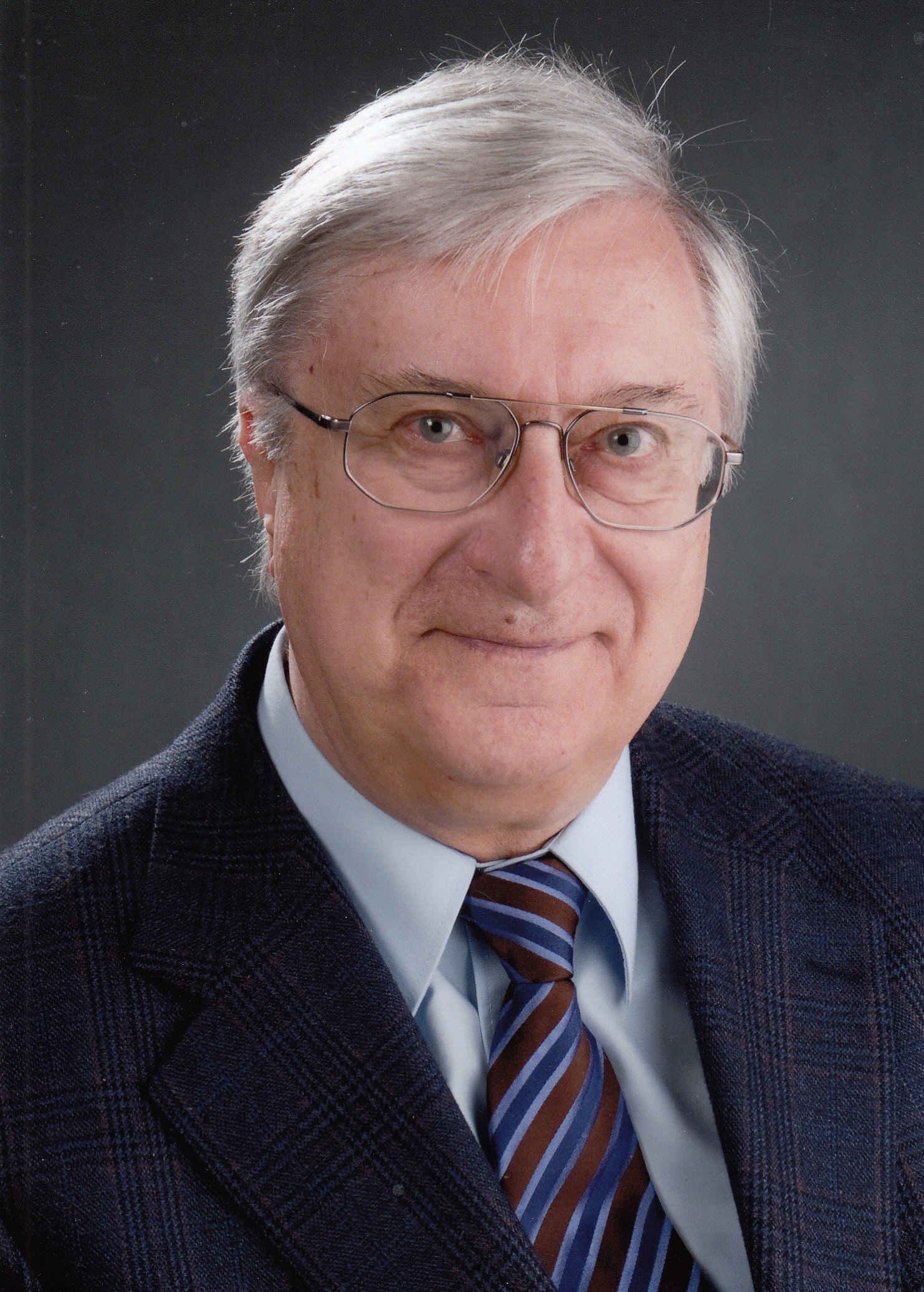
- Roth in 2017
- Born: January 2, 1938 (age 88)
- Education: PhD in natural science, 1990
- Alma mater: University of Nijmegen, Netherlands
- Occupations: Theologian and scientist, cultural historian and historian of science, educator and monument preservation and nature conservation activist
- Website: http://cist-natur.de

Hermann Josef Ludwig Roth (pseudonym: Antonius R.; author abbreviation: HJR) (b. 2 January 1938 at Montabaur) is a German theologian and scientist, cultural historian and historian of science, educator and monument preservation and nature conservation activist. He is a specialist in the area of mediaeval reform movements and is considered today’s foremost expert on the geography of the Rhineland region and on the life and work of the naturalist, Prince Maximilian of Wied-Neuwied, and his circle.

== Education and career ==
Hermann Roth was born on January 2, 1938 in Montabaur, Germany, the son of Landrat (Note: chief district-administrative officer) Heinrich Roth and his wife, Gertrud, née Ebert. From 1957 onwards, having completed his grammar school studies (examinations in advanced Greek, Latin and Hebrew), he initially lived as a Cistercian monk and was enrolled at the Heiligenkreuz Philosophical-Theological Institute (near Vienna). Following ordination as a priest (Frankfurt, 1963) he was active in the youth and community ministries of Marienstatt Abbey and at its grammar school.

From 1966, he studied biology and chemistry and auxiliary sciences (physics, palaeontology), passed both state examinations for academic teaching qualification (1970, 1972) and taught at a grammar school in Cologne. He assisted from time to time in the parish, youth and aged ministries. In 1991, Cologne‘s regional chief executive appointed Roth head of the advanced education division of the biology department; from 1995, he was director of studies. In 1990, Roth obtained a doctorate in natural sciences from the University of Nijmegen.

== Nature ==
Having become familiar early on with the surroundings of his birthplace, Roth worked toward a systematic registration of the geological and biological features of the Rhineland highlands and contributed to the Floristic Mapping of Central Europe project (1971–1988). He is considered the ”foremost expert on the Westerwald.“ Roth’s comprehensive study of this region called for an interdisciplinary type of enquiry, an approach which he subsequently applied to other topics, as well. A prime example is his analysis of the floral architectural sculpture of Gothic monuments (Altenberger Dom, 1976; Cologne Cathedral, 1990) under the aspects of botany and art history.

Generally speaking, Roth’s consistent aim has been to see scientific knowledge in the contexts of intellectual and social history: e.g., evolution in the light of the field of tension between knowledge and belief; ecological theories and ethical postulates versus the variety of ‘natural’ observation.

Since his school days, Roth has been active in the area of nature conservation and has on a pro bono basis held important positions in relevant associations and commissions. For some years, he ran the Biological Station, Bergisches Land. Since 1975, he has been a member of various advisory panels on local geography at both the community and state levels.

== Culture ==
Roth’s encounter with the Cistercians led to his search for the grave of Otto of Freising (1114–1158) at Morimond (1963). In 1979, Roth founded the international Carthusian Colloquia. Most recently, he worked toward restoring the popularity of Alanus ab insulis (Alain de Lille, d. 1203), including amongst those outside anthroposophical circles.

Concerning Roth, Peter Finke has concluded that:

“... no small number of theologians [...] have also become outstanding experts in fields of knowledge outside that of theology. However, in the case of Father Peter Roth, this phenomenon is more complex, as he is active both in the field of the natural sciences and in the fields of cultural history and the sciences of the mind. He has contributed to several domains of regional and cultural history, as well as to landscape geography and the history of science and has discovered interconnections which otherwise would hardly be known, thus saving them from oblivion [...]. But because he cannot be pinned down to one single discipline, he is the living embodiment of transdisciplinarity, whose exponents endeavour to uncover hidden connections by consciously ignoring disciplinary borders.“

— Finke

Roth’s work as a member of the Research Group for Monastic Medicine at the University of Würzburg (for which he even did research in Brazil) and his contribution to the monastic cultural landscape research programme at the Centre for Garden Art and Landscape Architecture (CGL) of Hannover’s Leibniz University (which centre was established on his own initiative) both exemplify this interdisciplinary approach.

Roth has been elected or appointed to numerous panels, including the Historic Commission for Nassau (since 1978) and the North Rhine-Westphalia Foundation for Nature Conservation and the Local History and Culture of Düsseldorf (1994–2000).

== The Americas ==
In the Americas, in particular Roth’s activities in the fields of the history of science and monastic medicine have led to close personal and academic connections and, in turn, to several publications.

=== United States ===
Roth’s research into Gothic architectural sculpture and the history and culture of the Cistercians led to invitations from Western Michigan University to participate in the International Congress on Medieval Studies at Kalamazoo, at which event he has delivered several papers.

Roth’s investigations relating to Prince Maximilian of Wied-Neuwied ultimately resulted in the establishment of a relevant project of academic exchange with the Center for Western Studies at the Joslyn Art Museum, Omaha. This in turn led to three journeys in which he retraced stepwise the travel route of Maximilian and Bodmer, with study stays at Philadelphia, Pennsylvania, and New Harmony and St. Louis, Missouri, as well as a side-trip to the Museum of Civilisation at Ottawa. (Note: The Museum of Civilisation changed 2013 to its current name Canadian Museum of History) These activities substantially benefited from support from Dr Karl-Heinz Boewe (d. 2013) of the University of Kentucky Libraries, Lexington, and his wife, Joan Lorna Pierce of the Western University of Kentucky.

=== Mexico ===
The original deeds in the archives of Heiligenkreuz Abbey concerning Father Dominik Bilimek (1813–1884), adviser to Ferdinand Maximilian Joseph von Habsburg, Archduke of Austria and Emperor of Mexico (1832–1867), served as the impetus for additional research in Mexico, which included studies at the Biblioteca Nacional de México and at the library and archives of the Dominican Order at Coapa, whose prior, Luis Gabriel Chico Sánchez (†), provided indispensable assistance. Study stays at the historic sites of the Austrian Intervention were followed by supplementary studies relating to the parallel project, monastic medicine, at Puebla.

=== Brazil ===
Brazil was the destination of the first ocean voyage of Prince Maximilian of Wied-Neuwied. This and the natural riches of the country made it excellently suited for both projects. The essential steps of Maximilian’s route were traced. Research into monastic medicine was carried out during stays at the historic monasteries in the coastal towns and at newer establishments in Manaus and Mato Grosso. The costs of the journey were in part borne by pharmaceutical firm Abtei (GSK). Subsequently, study trips were also made to Cabo Verde, Manaus (1999) und Moçambique.

== Didactics, journalism and bibliophile activities ==
As lecturer, excursion leader and activist in the field of environmental education both at home and abroad, Roth formulated relevant recommendations for the advisory committee of North Rhine-Westphalia’s Executive Landscape Conservation Authority (1998). Roth’s experiences as educator have found expression in such didactic and educational works as On ethics in biology instruction (Note: zur Ethik im Biologieunterricht, (1992)) and Earth sciences and biology didactics, (Note: Erdwissenschaften und Biologie-Didaktik, (2001)) the experiment kit for schools Ecology, (Note: Ökologie, (1986)) as well as in publications for a wider readership. As pioneering achievements, his nature guides to the Westerwald (Note: (1975), (1980)) and the Guide to nature in Cologne (Note: Kölner Naturführer, (1990)) can be mentioned.

As editor, Roth oversaw the publications Cistercian Chronicles. Forum for Monastic History, Art, Literature and Spirituality., Natural History and Local Geography, Regional Biology and Godesberg Local History and Culture.

Roth played a crucial role in the creation of the Westerwald Landscape Museum at Hachenburg and contributed in an advisory capacity to the preparations for the founding of the LVR Open-Air Museum in Lindlar, North-Rhein-Westphalia. He stimulated the organisation of important exhibitions and contributed to them in an advisory capacity: The Cistercians. Ideal and reality of monastic life , (Note: Aachen, 1980) Flora and fauna of the Cologne Cathedral , (Note: Cologne, 1989: Botanic Garden, Domforum) Maximilian of Wied-Neuwied. Hunter, scholar, traveller , (Note: Bonn, Cologne, Dortmund, Frankfurt et al., 1995 ff.) 900 years Cîteaux – Rhenish Cistercians as revealed in the art of book design , (Note: Landesmuseum Mainz 1998/99) 500 years Brazil – from Rhine to Rio . (Note: Permanent Representation of the State of Rhineland-Palatinate, Bonn, 2000) He contributed to Männerbande – Männerbünde. On the role of men in comparative sociology (Note: Rautenstrauch-Joest-Museum, Cologne, 1990) and The Cologne Charterhouse ca. 1500 . (Note: Municipal Museum, Cologne, 1991)

Roth enlarged the family library dedicated to regional geography (Nassovica, Rhenania) and expanded it to include additional subject areas (monastica, Brasiliensia, acta rerum naturalium). Portions of the library, including archived material, have now been acquired by the Montabaur Municipal Archives, Stiftung Naturschutzgeschichte, Biohistoricum Bonn, the Historic Archives of the Archdiocese of Cologne and the Archives of the Diocese of Limburg.

== Affiliations ==
Roth is active in a number of specialist organisations. He is a founding member of the German Society for the History and Theory of Biology (DGGTB, 1991) and a member of the executive committee of the Natural History Society of the Rhinelands and Westphalia (NHV) and of a number of historical societies and hikers’ clubs.

== Awards and honours ==
- Scholarship of the Nassauischen Kulturstiftung (1958)
- Appointment at correspondent member of the Dokumentationszentrum Kannenbäckerland, Höhr-Grenzhausen (1976)
- Silver badge of honour of the Deutschen Lebensrettungs-Gesellschaft (DLRG, 1977)
- Albert-Steeger-Stipendium des Landschaftsverbandes Rheinland (1979)
- Umweltschutzmedaille der Deutschen Umweltstiftung (1985)
- Bruno H.-Schubert-Preis (1988)
- Golden badge of honour of the Westerwald-Vereins (1989)
- Rheinlandtaler, Landschaftsverband Rheinland (1998)
- Prize of the Umweltstiftung of the land of Rhineland-Palatinate (2001)
- Bundesverdienstkreuz (2006)
- Certificate of the Gesellschaft für Naturschutz und Ornithologie Rheinland-Pfalz (2003)
- Golden badge of honour of the Verbandes der Deutschen Gebirgs- und Wandervereine (2007)
- Verdienstorden des Landes Nordrhein-Westfalen (2014)
- Membership Naturhistorischen Verein der Rheinlande und Westfalens, Bonn (2018)
- Botanical honorary taxon: Habenaria hermannjosef-rothii (2020)

2366-0643

== Sources ==
- Guide to Cistercian scholarship. 2. Ed.: Institute of Cistercian Studies, Western Michigan University. Kalamazoo 1985, p. 125 f.
- Who's Who in the World 1998,15. ed. New Providence/NJ-USA: Marquis, 1997, p. 1207
- American Biographical Institute (Ed.): 1000 Leaders of world influence – o. O. (USA) 2001, p. 389
- Kürschners Deutscher Sachbuch-Kalender 2003/2004. Munich, Leipzig: K.G. Saur, 2004, p. 626 [refer. to p. 935, 949, 967, 970, 980, 994, 996, 998] ISBN 3-598-24181-X
- Who’s Who. 13. ed. Berlin, Wien 2007, p. 766–767, 1 fig.
- Eberle, Jürgen (2010). Leben und Forschen für das Bergische Land. In: Rh.-Berg. Kalender, 80, 2010. Bergisch-Gladbach: Heider. pp. 192–200. ISBN 978-3-87314-444-6.
- Finke, Peter (2014). Citizen Science. Das unterschätzte Wissen der Laien. Munich: oekom. pp. 115–116. ISBN 978-3-86581-466-1.
- European Almanac of Sholars. Vienna: IDB, 2019, p. 839; ISBN 978-3-922236-76-4
- Eifeljahrbuch 2019. Hg.: Eifelverein. Düren 2018, p. 18–24; ISBN 978-3-944620-26-8

== Publications (choice) ==
=== Works as author ===
- Roth, Hermann Josef (1966). "Abtei Marienstatt. Architektur und Kunst". Marienstatter Gesammelte Aufsätze. (2)., Hachenburg
- Roth, Hermann Josef (1976). Die Pflanzen in der Bauplastik des Altenberger Domes. Ein Beitrag zur Kunstgeschichte und zur mittelalterlichen Botanik. Bergisch Gladbach., 156 p., 379 fig.
- Roth, Hermann Josef (1989). Der Westerwald. Kultur und Landschaft zwischen Rhein, Lahn und Sieg. Cologne: DuMont. ISBN 3-7701-1198-2., 294 p., 142 fig.
- Roth, Hermann Josef (1982). Das Bergische Land. Geschichte und Kultur zwischen Rhein, Ruhr und Sieg. Cologne: Bachem. ISBN 3-7616-0611-7., 224 p., 16 fig.
- Roth, Hermann Josef (1993). Siegerland, Westerwald, Lahn und Taunus. Geologie, Mineralogie und Paläontologie. Bindlach: Gondrom. ISBN 3-8112-1055-6., 176 p, 158 fig.
- Roth, Hermann Josef (1986). Ökologie. Grundlegende Schülerversuche zu Ökologie und Umweltschutz. Bonn: Maey., 71 p. for it: Schülerheft. 56 p.
- Roth, Hermann Josef (1986). Hessen. Munich: Prestel. ISBN 3-7913-0770-3., 640 p., ca. 70 fig.
- Roth, Hermann Josef (1988). Bonn. Von der römischen Garnison zur Bundeshauptstadt. Cologne: DuMont. ISBN 3-7701-1970-3., 364 p., 143 fig.
- Roth, Hermann Josef (1989). Naturkundliche Bibliographie des rechtsrheinischen Schiefergebirges zwischen Lahn und Sieg. Hessen, Nordrhein-Westfalen, Rheinland-Pfalz (= Planaria III). Overath: BSBL. ISSN 0931-3737., 202 p.
- Roth, Hermann Josef (1990). Die bauplastischen Pflanzendarstellungen des Mittelalters im Kölner Dom. Eine botanische Bestandsaufnahme (= Europäische Hochschulschriften XXVIII/117). Frankfurt am Main, Bern, New York, Paris: Lang. ISBN 3-631-43225-9., 196 p., 30 fig.
- Kloft, Christoph; Roth, Hermann Josef (2008). ... und mittendrin der Westerwald. Geschichten und Geschicke in Europas Mitte. Blickpunkte zwischen Mainz und Köln. Trier: Paulinus Verlag. ISBN 978-3-7902-1627-1.
- Roth, Hermann Josef (2011). "Klöstergärten aus Sicht von Botanik und Kulturgeschichte". Jahrbücher des Nassauischen Vereins für Naturkunde (142): 29–55., 10 fig.
- Roth, Hermann Josef (2013). Montabaur. Schloss und Stadt (= Gr. Kunstführer Bd. 273). Regensburg: Schnell & Steiner. ISBN 978-3795426712., 48 p.
- Roth, Hermann Josef (2019). Φαρμακοποία - Spuren antiker Heilweisen und Heilslehren in Klöstern. Klostergärten in Deutschland. Hannover: Herrenhäuser Matinée. pp. 21–62.
- Roth, Hermann Joesf (2021). La fouille du choer de l'Abbaye en 1963. In: Morimond 1117-2017. Approches pluridisciplinaires d'un reseau monastique. Nancy: PUN-Éditions Universitaires de Lorraine. pp. 45–50. ISBN 978-2-8143-0588-5.

=== Publisher/editor ===
- Elm, Kaspar; Joerißen, Peter (1980). Die Zisterzienser. Ausstellungskatalog (= Schriften d. Rhein. Museumsamtes, 10). Rheinland-Verlag. ISBN 978-3792705575., 707 p.
- Ebert, Ferdinand (1993). Unser Bistum. Ereignisse und Gestalten aus der Geschichte des Bistums Limburg. Grevenbroich: Bernardus. ISBN 3-910082-07-6., 440 p.
- Roth, Hermann Josef (1995). "Maximilian Prinz zu Wied. Jäger, Reisender, Naturforscher". Fauna und Flora in Rheinland-Pfalz, Beiheft 17. ISSN 0938-7684.
- Eberth, Herbert A.; Kremer, Bruno (1997). Kulturlandschaft Westerwald. Perspektiven einer ökologischen Regionalentwicklung (= POLLICHIA-Buch No. 35). Bad Dürkheim.
- Prinz zu Wied, Maximilian (1820–21). Reise nach Brasilien in den Jahren 1815 bis 1817, fol. I u. II (Reprint 2001, Editor Roth, Hermann J., Gardez!, St. Agustin ed.). Frankfurt am Main. ISBN 3-89796-026-5.
- Alte und gefährdete Haustierrassen – Arnsberg: LNU, 2003 - 108 p., – ISBN 3-00-014975-9
- Roth, Hermann Josef; Wolschke-Bulmahn, Joachim; Hauptmeyer, Carl-Hans; Schönermark, Gesa (2009). Klostergärten und klösterliche Kulturlandschaften (= CGL-Studies, 6). Munich: Meidenbauer. ISBN 978-3-89975-167-3.

== Audio-visual media/teaching materials ==
- Die Zisterzienser. Ordensleben zwischen Ideal und Wirklichkeit - Slideshow with soundtrack, 36 slides, backup 49 p.; ed. with Chrysostomus Schulz - CALIG-Verlag, München 1983
- SVN-Ökologie. Schülerversuchssystem: equipment, chemicals, teachers notes‘, exercise book. Bonn: Prof. Maey, 1986
- Westerwald. Land zwischen Rhein, Lahn und Sieg - Cassette film (50 Min.). arbeda-media Wesseling 1989
