= Staudt =

- Municipality
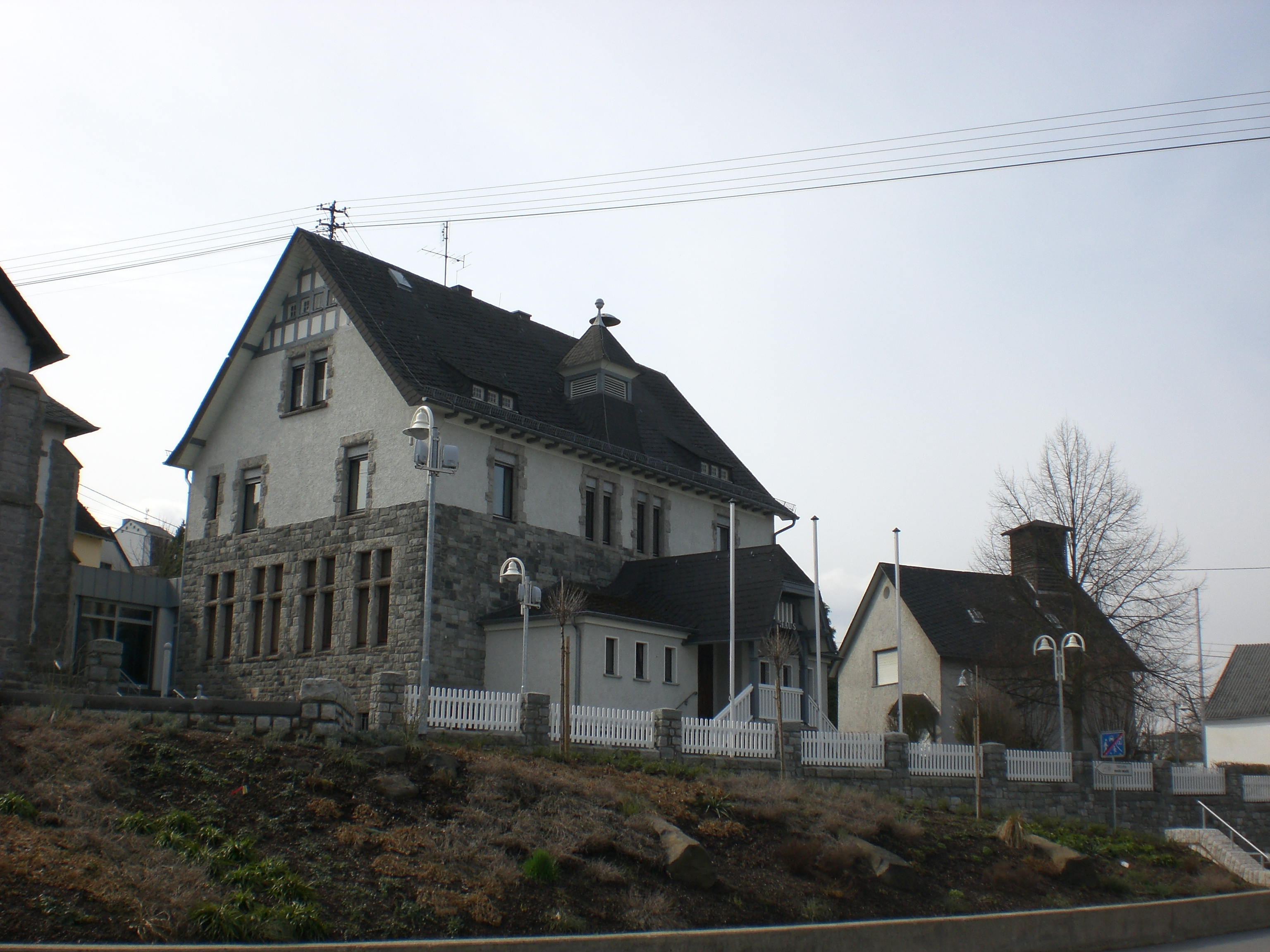

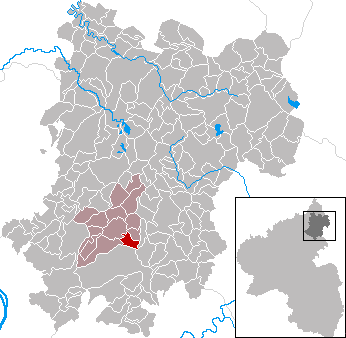
- Location of Staudt within Westerwaldkreis district
- Interactive map of Staudt
- Location within Germany Location within Rhineland-Palatinate
- Coordinates: 50°28′2″N 7°49′36″E
- Country: Germany
- State: Rhineland-Palatinate
- District: Westerwaldkreis
- Municipal assoc.: Wirges

Government
  - Mayor (2019–24): Sven Normann

Area
  - Total: 2.65 km^{2} (1.02 sq mi)
- Elevation: 265 m (869 ft)

Population (2025-12-31)
  - Total: 1,274
  - Density: 481/km^{2} (1,250/sq mi)
- Time zone: UTC+01:00 (CET)
  - Summer (DST): UTC+02:00 (CEST)
- Postal codes: 56424
- Dialling codes: 02602
- Vehicle registration: WW
- Website: www.staudt.info

Staudt is an Ortsgemeinde – a community belonging to a Verbandsgemeinde – in the Westerwaldkreis in Rhineland-Palatinate, Germany.

== Geography ==
The municipal area lies at elevations from 260 to 285 m above sea level. The community lies in the southern Westerwald on the edge of the Montabaur Hollow (Montabaurer Senke) and belongs to the so-called Kannenbäckerland (“Jug Bakers’ Land”, a small region known for its ceramics industry). Towards its south, Staudt stretches to the 286-metre-high slope of the mountain Am Hähnchen, whereas from east to west, the community's area spreads out into a 265-metre-high plain. In the north lies the rest of the residential and new-town area in the foothills of the 277-metre-high Kramberg. The highest elevation in the municipal area is the 291-metre-high Fussenacker. Through Staudt flow the Aubach and the Unterbach. Since 1972 the community has belonged to what was then the newly founded Verbandsgemeinde of Wirges – a kind of collective municipality – whose seat is in the like-named town.

== History ==
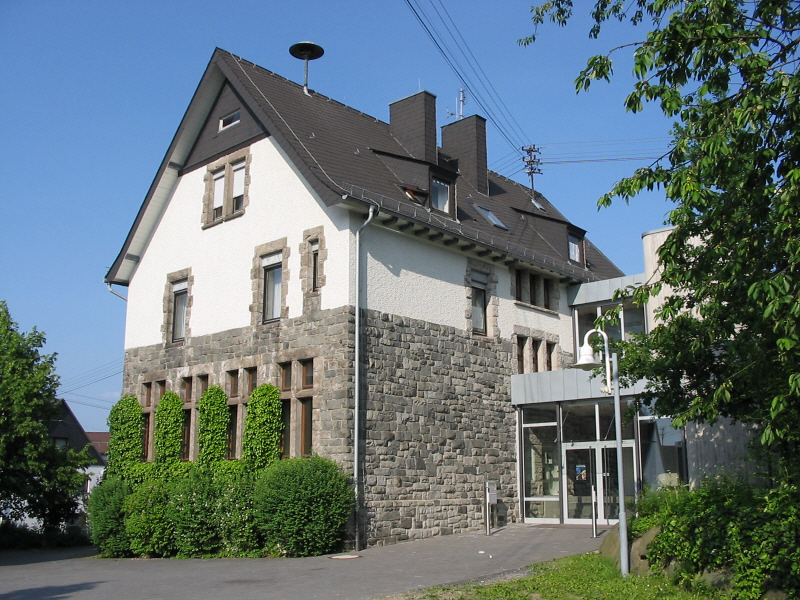
Old school in Staudt

Staudt has existed since the Late Middle Ages. Since days of yore it has belonged to the parish of Wirges, itself originally a daughter parish of the parish of Humbach-Montabaur, although over time it became a parish in its own right. Parish patronage rights and the tithe (a rent) in turn were held by St. Florin's Monastery in Koblenz. The first documentary mention of Stude stemmed from a document from this monastery in 1367. More precisely, the document was about rental paid in grain, oats and chickens within the Bann (an administrative unit) of Montabaur, wherein also lay Staudt. In the Bann of Montabaur, the Archbishop of Trier exercised exclusive power over the inhabitants. The villages were obliged to do labour, that is to say, the people were unfree, counted as “goods”, and went by any sale or exchange into the new lord's ownership. The Bann was subdivided into smaller administrative zones. Together with six further communities, Staudt – no later than 1488 – formed the so-called große Zeche, until further division in 1653. This yielded a new Zeche with Leuterod, Hosten, Ötzingen and Staudt.

This was shortly after the Thirty Years' War ended, which was not without consequences even for Staudt, as the number of families fell from 18 in 1605 to only 9 in 1684. It is assumed that there were even fewer inhabitants at the time of the war's end, as a population directory from 1678 lists only 7 families. Passing armies brought horrors and poverty to the Bann of Montabaur. Many people fled; almost two thirds died. Presumably in the late 17th century, the Bann of Montabaur was split up and a Bann of Wirges came into being (the exact date is unknown), to which Staudt also belonged. The Amt administrator, Court Council Linz reported the following in 1786:

“The inhabitants of the Bann of Wirges show themselves to be sensible, are hardworking (that is to say enterprising), and yet docile, love foreigners, are at home thrifty to the point of miserliness and at the inn wasteful to the point of showing off; can be called more cleanly than uncleanly.”

From the end of the Holy Roman Empire in 1806 until the Austro-Prussian War in 1866, the community – at the time fighting on Austria’s side – belonged to the newly founded Duchy of Nassau. Nassau, however, was annexed and became Prussian and at first part of the North German Confederation and then later the German Empire. The community and its inhabitants lived through two world wars. In a bombardment on 18 March 1944, 18 buildings were utterly destroyed. However, not only were these houses long ago rebuilt, but also the community has changed from an agricultural community to one based more on industry and services.

== Politics ==
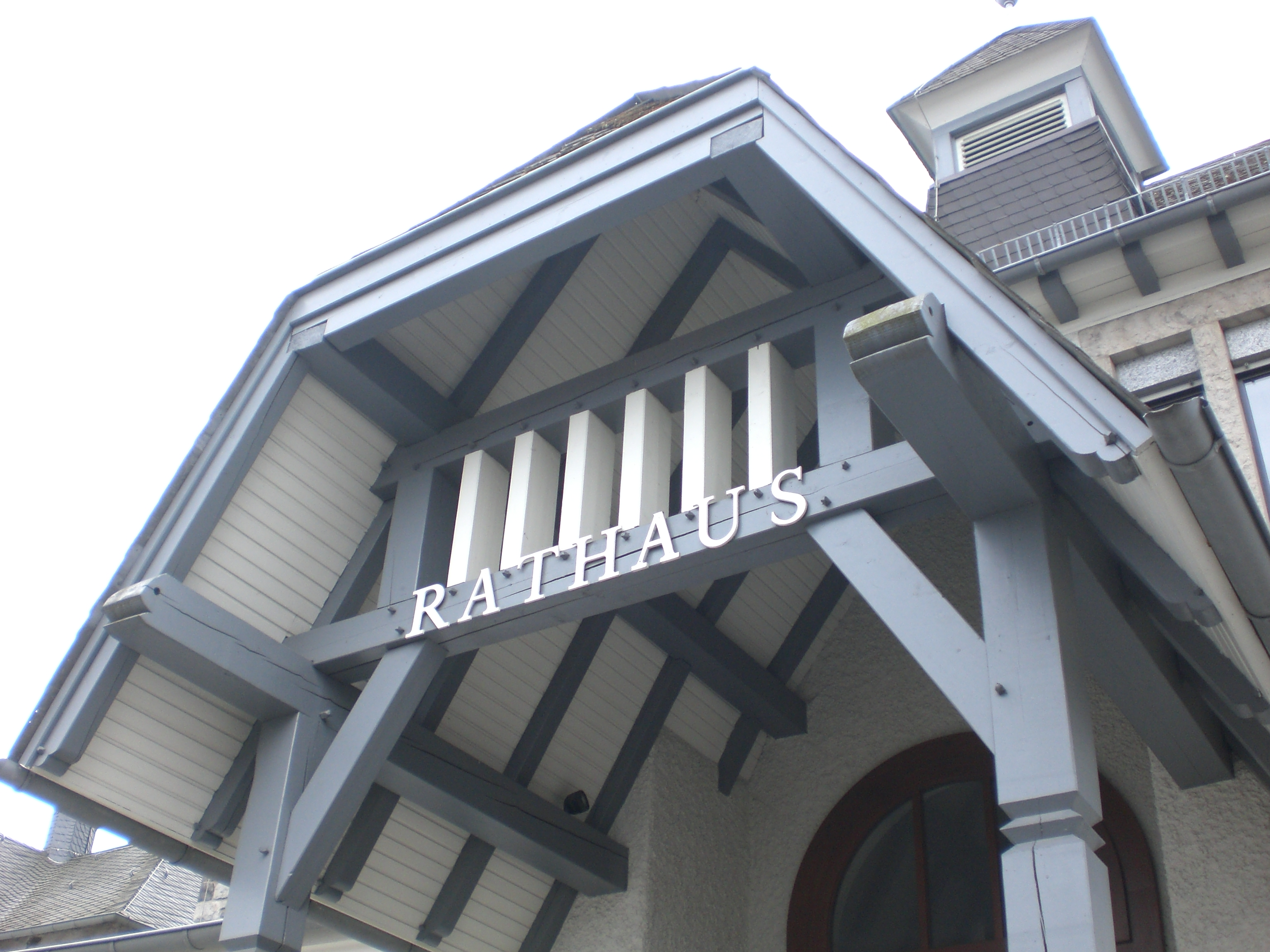
Town hall

The municipal council is made up of 17 council members, including the extraofficial mayor (Bürgermeister), who were elected in a majority vote in a municipal election on 13 June 2004.

== Economy and infrastructure ==
=== Clay quarrying ===
As in the area as a whole, there is clay quarrying in Staudt. The biggest company that processes clay and that lies in Staudt is Osmose, which manufactures ceramic products.

=== Transport ===
Staudt is connected to the public bus transport through the lines 459, 463, 481, 482 and 958. Staudt is located in the fare zone number 414 of the transport association Verkehrsverbund Rhein-Mosel (VRM).

The town also is only two kilometres from both the towns of Montabaur and Wirges, as well as the nationally important roads Bundesstraße 255 and the A 3 (Cologne–Frankfurt). Limburg an der Lahn and Koblenz are each twenty minutes’ drive away, and Cologne and Frankfurt may be reached in one hour.

At the border to Bannberscheid, the former train stop of Cross Westerwald railway (Montabaur - Wallmerod - Westerburg - Rennerod - Herborn), was located, was located, nowadays this line between Montabaur and Wallmerod is only in service for fright traffic, from Fehl-Ritzhausen to Rennerod station touristic Railbike tours take place organized by the interest group IG Westerwald-Querbahn e. V. (IWQ), special train rides from Montabaur to Wallmerod took place in 2005, 2006, 2007 and 2010.

The nearest accesses to train services are at Wirges and Dernbach on the Limburg-Staffel–Siershahn railway. The industrial area of Staudt also is located close to Heiligenroth industrial area, where the trains of the Limburg-Staffel - Siershahn railway (RB29) pass very close, although no train stop has been constructed yet.

The InterCityExpress railway station at Montabaur is only two kilometres away; travel time to either Cologne or Frankfurt is only 30 minutes.

== Staudt as a surname ==
Staudt is quite a common German surname. The origin lies in the fact that when surnames came into being – at least as they are known today – it was, among other things, customary to assign people to their home towns or villages. Often, occupational descriptions or even nicknames were used. Staudt, however, is without a doubt one of these geographical-origin surnames, meaning that its bearers’ forebears did indeed come from Staudt. Emigration from Germany has also spread the name abroad.

In 1367, Staudt cropped up as Stude. In 1388 it was Stut and in 1448 Stude. In 1557, history mentions an Electorate of Trier council named Michael Staudt von Limburg. In the early 18th century, the name's bearers settled on the spelling Staudt.

In the early to mid-19th century in America many families changed the surname of Staudt to Stout, which is a phonetic spelling based on the American pronunciation.

== Ponds ==
To Staudt belong several ponds (Weiher) lying south of the village, namely Schräderweiher, Weberweiher, Ochsenheide, Birkenweiher, Fussenweiher and the Morschenweiher, which in droughts becomes nothing more than a muddy pool.

== Sightseeing ==
- Old school (today the town hall), built 1907/08
- Old church, built 1865, expanded 1922/23
- New church, built 1959
- Waldkapelle (“Forest Chapel”) in der Ös, renovated 2007
- Birkensportplatz (sporting ground), originally with cinder loop track, built 1945
- Sportlerheim, built 1991
