= Ötzingen =

- Municipality
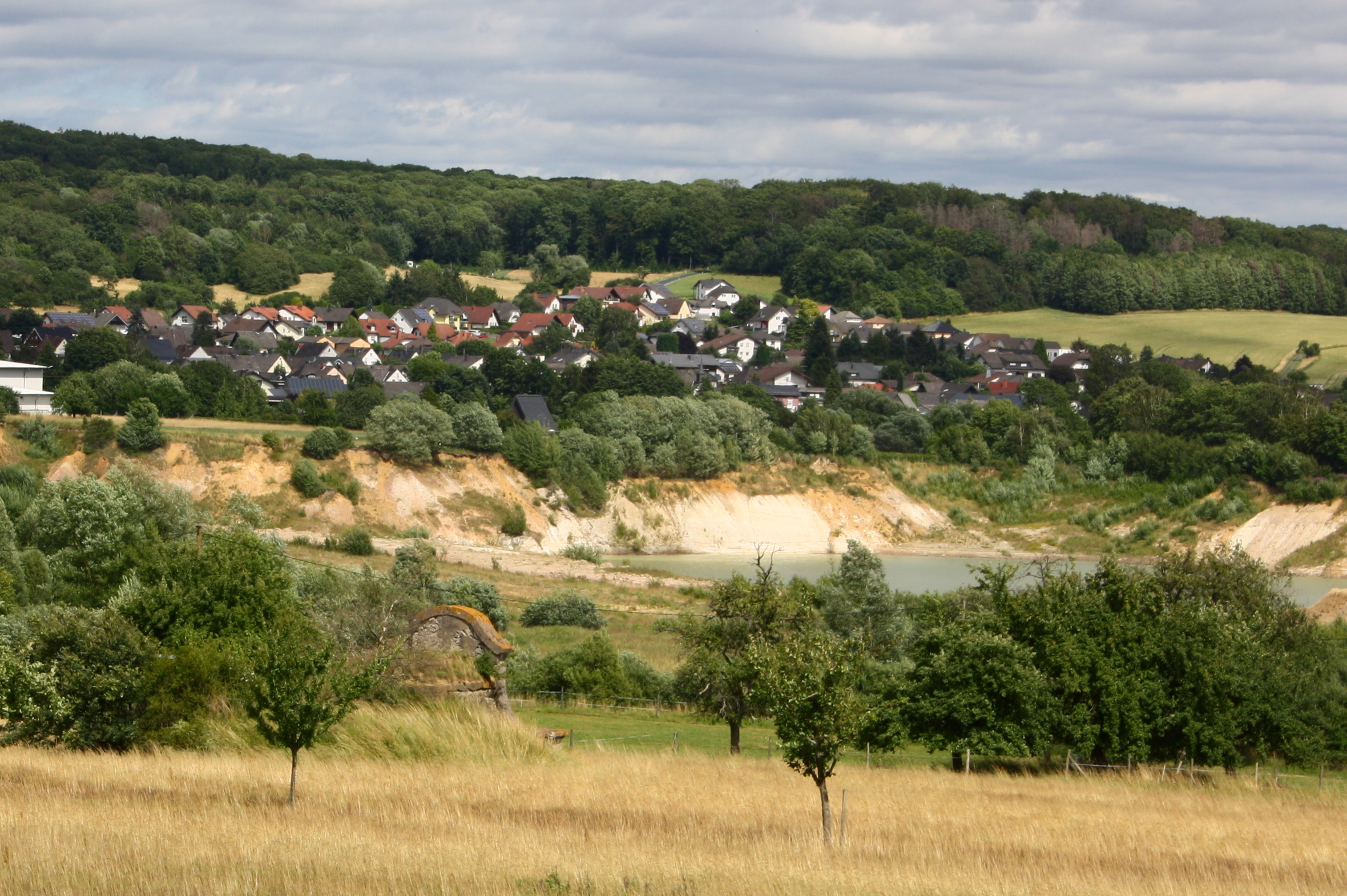

- Coat of arms

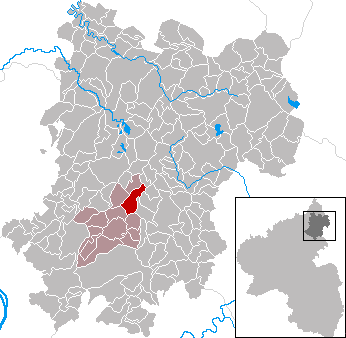
- Location of Ötzingen within Westerwaldkreis district
- Interactive map of Ötzingen
- Location within Germany Location within Rhineland-Palatinate
- Coordinates: 50°30′8″N 7°49′58″E
- Country: Germany
- State: Rhineland-Palatinate
- District: Westerwaldkreis
- Municipal assoc.: Wirges

Government
  - Mayor (2019–24): Ansgar Ritz

Area
  - Total: 5.98 km^{2} (2.31 sq mi)
- Elevation: 310 m (1,020 ft)

Population (2025-12-31)
  - Total: 1,378
  - Density: 230/km^{2} (597/sq mi)
- Time zone: UTC+01:00 (CET)
  - Summer (DST): UTC+02:00 (CEST)
- Postal codes: 56244
- Dialling codes: 02602 / 02666 (S´holz)
- Vehicle registration: WW

Ötzingen is an Ortsgemeinde – a community belonging to a Verbandsgemeinde – in the Westerwaldkreis in Rhineland-Palatinate, Germany.

== Geography ==
The community lies at the foot of the Malberg, a wooded volcanic cone found within the neighbouring community of Moschheim. Other neighbouring communities are Leuterod, Niederahr, Oberahr, Ettinghausen, Kuhnhöfen, Niedersayn and Helferskirchen. Along the edge of the community winds the Aubach, which rises in the outlying centre of Sainerholz some 3 km from the community's main centre. Ötzingen belongs to the Verbandsgemeinde of Wirges, a kind of collective municipality. Its seat is in the like-named town.

As is so throughout the so-called Kannenbäckerland (“Jug Bakers’ Land”, a region home to Europe’s largest clay deposit and its grey and blue Westerwald Pottery since the 16th century), clay quarrying plays an important role. Somewhat outside the community is found a production centre for world-famous clay mosaics.

Ötzingen has one outlying centre called Sainerholz.

== History ==
The community's name comes from the Old High German Uitzingen, most likely meaning some such thing as “Uitzo’s (or Utz’s) Offspring”. The ending –ingen leads to the supposition that at the time the land was taken, it had already been cleared, or there were no woods found there, in turn leading to the conclusion that the community's founding time was somewhere between the late 6th century and the 11th century.

The name has appeared in various spellings over the centuries:

- About 1362: Ozingen
- About 1385: Oezingin
- About 1386: Oitzingen
- About 1417: Oytzingen
- About 1476: Uitzingen, Ober-Otzingen
- About 1589: Oezingin

== Politics ==
The municipal council is made up of 17 council members, including the extraofficial mayor (Bürgermeister), who were elected in a municipal election on 13 June 2004.

	BfÖ - Bürger für Ötzingen	SPD	Total
2004	12	4	16 seats
