= Kannenbäckerland =

Central German cultural landscape

Coordinates: 50°29′52″N 7°45′40″E

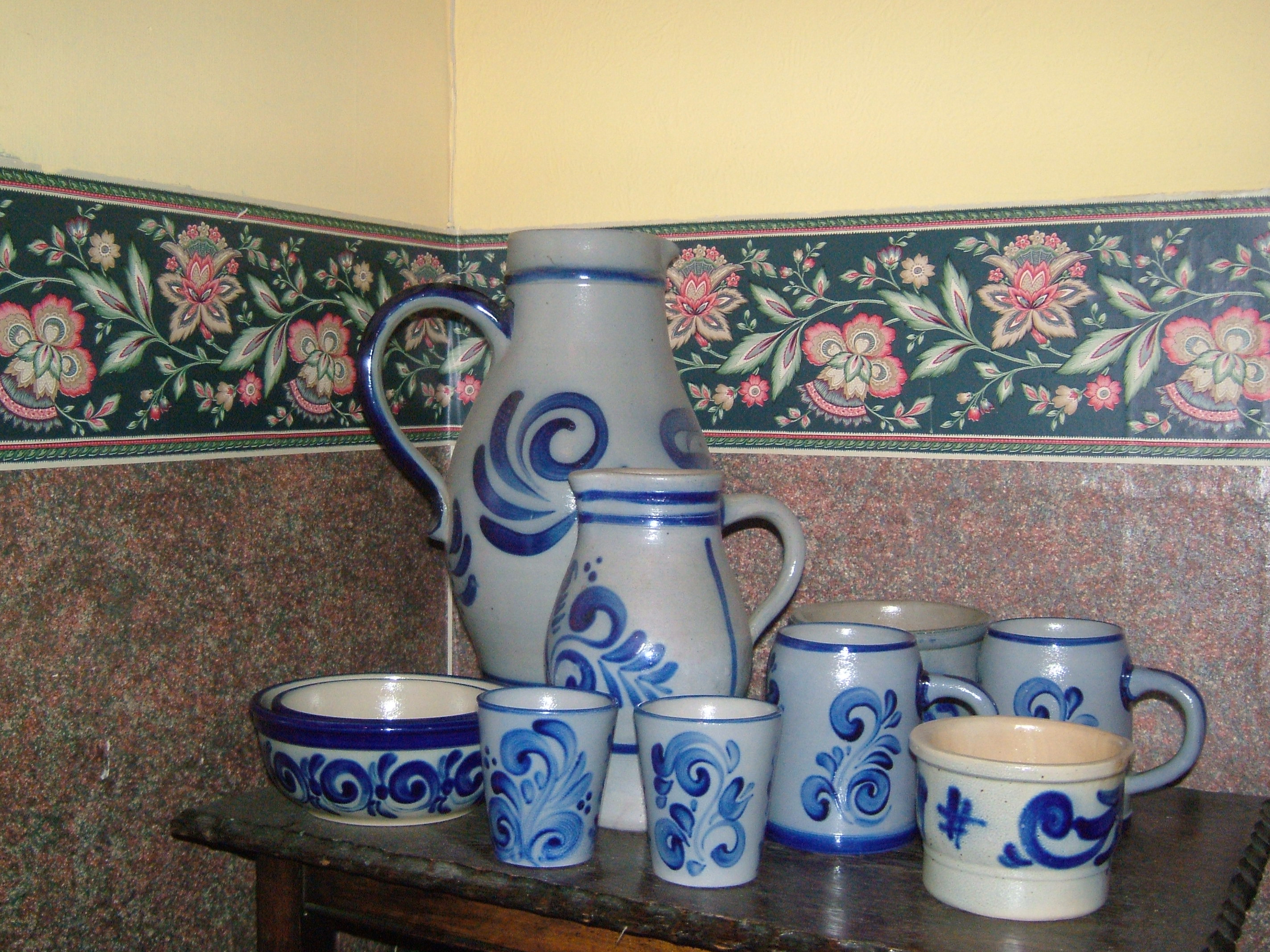
Saltglazed stoneware from the Kannenbäckerland with typical regional decoration

The Kannenbäckerland (German pronunciation: [ˈkanənbɛkɐˌlant]; 'potters' land', lit. 'jug bakers' land') is a cultural landscape in central Germany, which extends from Wirges in the Westerwald hills to Bendorf and Vallendar in the Middle Rhine valley. The Kannenbäckerland owes its name to the fact that, in this region, the largest clay deposit in Europe was found and, since the 16th century, has been used to make the well-known grey and blue Westerwald Pottery.

== Formation ==
In addition to pot making and, especially in Hilgert pipe making for the production of the clay, tobacco pipes which were once common, pottery craftsmanship and training have also been concentrated in the Kannenbäckerland. Since 1879, Höhr-Grenzhausen has been home to the College of Ceramics, which later became part of the Ceramics Department of the Koblenz University of Applied Sciences. Its training comprises eight terms and it awards a diploma in materials engineering, glass and ceramics.

In addition to the University of Applied Sciences, six other specialist institutions joined forces in the Education and Research Centre for Ceramics (BFZK) and offer a competence network for ceramics that is unique in the world. This also led to the organization of the special exhibition "Ceramics - Material of the Future" at the World Exhibition for Expo 2000 in Hanover, which was organized by the BFZK. The BFZK includes, among others, the new business centre of CeraTech for ceramic technologies and materials, the Glass and Ceramics Research Institute, the Institute for Artistic Ceramics and Glass, various educational institutions and, of course, the Westerwald Pottery Museum.

== Locations ==
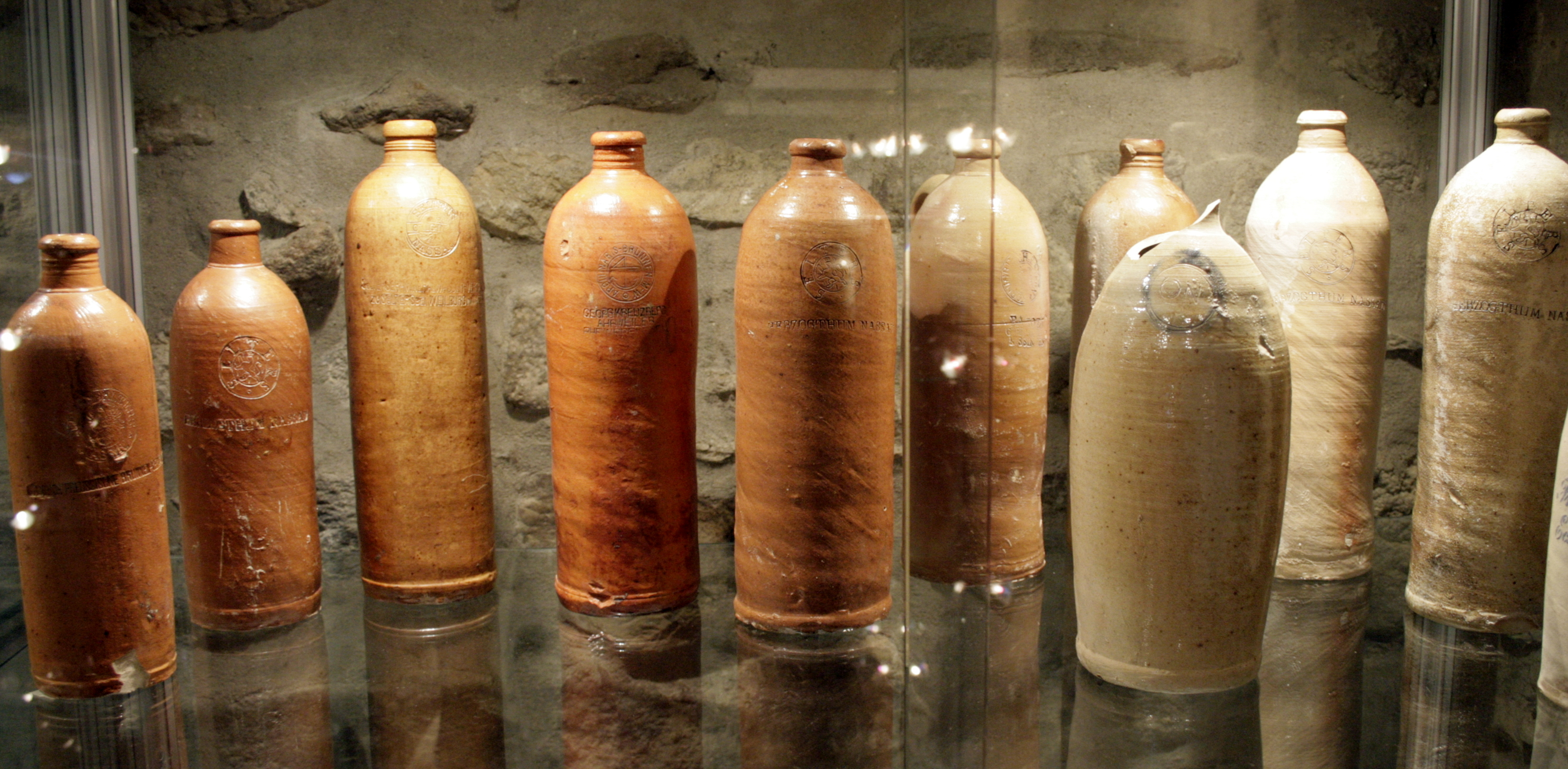
Even mass-produced pottery plays a role: mineral water bottles from the 19th century in the Tower Museum in Mengerskirchen.

The main sites of the clay industry developed from the main extraction areas near Wirges and down to the Rhine. Clay was extracted in Wirges, worked in the western districts of Höhr-Grenzhausen and Ransbach-Baumbach and stored on the Rhine near Bendorf and Vallendar for transportation to the markets. Other well known sites in the Kannenbäckerland are Bannberscheid, Ebernhahn, Hillscheid, Hilgert, Hundsdorf, Leuterod, Mogendorf, Moschheim, Nauort, Ötzingen, Sessenbach, Siershahn and Staudt.

== History ==
The Kannenbäckerland was described as such in the late 18th century, although the records show that pottery had been continuously made here since at least 1402. The surrounding regions and areas referred to the occupation of potter (normally Töpfer in German) either as Dippemacher (in Hessian) Döppesbäcker (in the area of Cologne) or Töpfer and Hafner (in the Palatine dialect). They were only called Kannenbäcker (or Kannebäcker) in a relatively small area south of Cologne and in the southern Westerwald. Traditionally the "Kannebäckerland" supplied the Frankfurt region upstream on the Rhine with Apfelwein Bembel, a grey earthenware jug with bule decoration for serving apple cider. Down the Rhine in the Netherlands, clay pots in the classic blue décor were known as Keulse pot ("Cologne Pots"). The Mosellen vintners, when working in the vineyard, had their daily wine or Fluppes ration in brown Bimmes (see photograph).

== Tourism ==
Due to its location between the Middle Rhine valley in the west and the Westerwald in the east, the Rhine-Westerwald Nature Park in the north and the Nassau Nature Park in the south, the Kannenbäckerland is a very good destination for active holidaymakers. Numerous footpaths and trails, such as the Brexbach Gorge Way ("Wäller Tour") and the geo trail near Nauort, a large Nordic walking park and well-surfaced cycleways run through the region.

Among the most popular destinations in the Kannenbäckerland are the castle of Schloss Sayn with its butterfly garden in two breeding houses, the Brexbach valley, der Limes Tower and the Roman fortlet in Hillscheid, the Westerwald Pottery Museum, and the annual Europ pottery markets in Höhr-Grenzhausen and Ransbach-Baumbach.

== Literature ==
- Ulrich Fliess: Volkskundliche Abteilung. Exhibition catalogue of the Historisches Museum Hannover, 1972. pp. 99–102: „Westerwälder Steinzeug“ und „Wandvitrine 142“ nebst Tafel 15.
