= Bannberscheid =

- Municipality
- Coat of arms

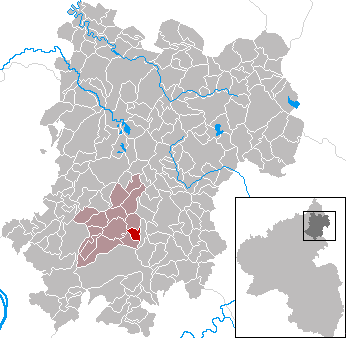
- Location of Bannberscheid within Westerwaldkreis district
- Interactive map of Bannberscheid
- Location within Germany Location within Rhineland-Palatinate
- Coordinates: 50°28′28″N 7°50′16″E
- Country: Germany
- State: Rhineland-Palatinate
- District: Westerwaldkreis
- Municipal assoc.: Wirges

Government
  - Mayor (2019–24): Georg Holl

Area
  - Total: 1.88 km^{2} (0.73 sq mi)
- Elevation: 260 m (850 ft)

Population (2025-12-31)
  - Total: 687
  - Density: 365/km^{2} (946/sq mi)
- Time zone: UTC+01:00 (CET)
  - Summer (DST): UTC+02:00 (CEST)
- Postal codes: 56424
- Dialling codes: 02602
- Vehicle registration: WW

Bannberscheid is an Ortsgemeinde – a municipality belonging to a Verbandsgemeinde – in the Westerwaldkreis in Rhineland-Palatinate, Germany.

== Geography ==
The municipality lies north of Montabaur some 260 m in elevation in meadowland with a gradually climbing slope, within the low mountain landscape of the Westerwald, which is framed by the high Westerwald and the Montabaur Heights (Montabaurer Höhenzug). Since 1971 the municipality has belonged to what was then the newly founded Verbandsgemeinde of Wirges, a kind of collective municipality.

== History ==
In 1211, Bannberscheid had its first documentary mention. From 1895 to 1897, the village church was built. The municipality was electrified in 1921 and in 1937 it was connected to the sewer system. Until the 1960s, clay quarrying was the municipality's main source of income.

== Politics ==
=== municipality council ===
The council is made up of 13 council members, including the extraofficial mayor (Bürgermeister), who were elected in a majority vote in a municipal election on 7 June 2009.

=== Coat of arms ===
The municipality's arms were introduced in 1992 upon a decision by the council. They show a bend sinister of silver and red dividing the field into blue and gold. Above is a gold waterwheel and below along the shield's edge are three blue steps.

== Economy and infrastructure ==
The public local bus lines 424, 463, 481, 482 and 958 connect Bannberscheid to the public transport. The village is located in the fare zone 414 of the public transport association Verkehrsverbund Rhein-Mosel (VRM).

West of the municipality runs Bundesstraße 255, which leads from Montabaur to Rennerod. The nearest Autobahn interchange is Montabaur on the A 3 (Cologne–Frankfurt am Main), some 3 km away.

In Bannberscheid, at the border to Studt, the former train stop of Herborn–Montabaur railway (Montabaur - Wallmerod - Westerburg - Rennerod - Herborn), was located, nowadays this line between Montabaur and Wallmerod is only in service for fright traffic, from Fehl-Ritzhausen to Rennerod station touristic Railbike tours take place organized by the interest group IG Westerwald-Querbahn e. V. (IWQ). Special train rides from Montabaur via Bannberscheid/Staudt to Wallmerod organized by IWQ took place in 2005, 2006, 2007 and 2010.

Bannberscheid also is located close to Heiligenroth industrial area, where the trains of the Limburg-Staffel - Siershahn railway (RB29) pass very close, although no train stop has been constructed yet.

The nearest access to train service is Wirges on the Limburg-Staffel–Siershahn railway. The nearest InterCityExpress stop is at the railway station at Montabaur on the Cologne-Frankfurt high-speed rail line.
