= Boden, Germany =

Boden
- Municipality
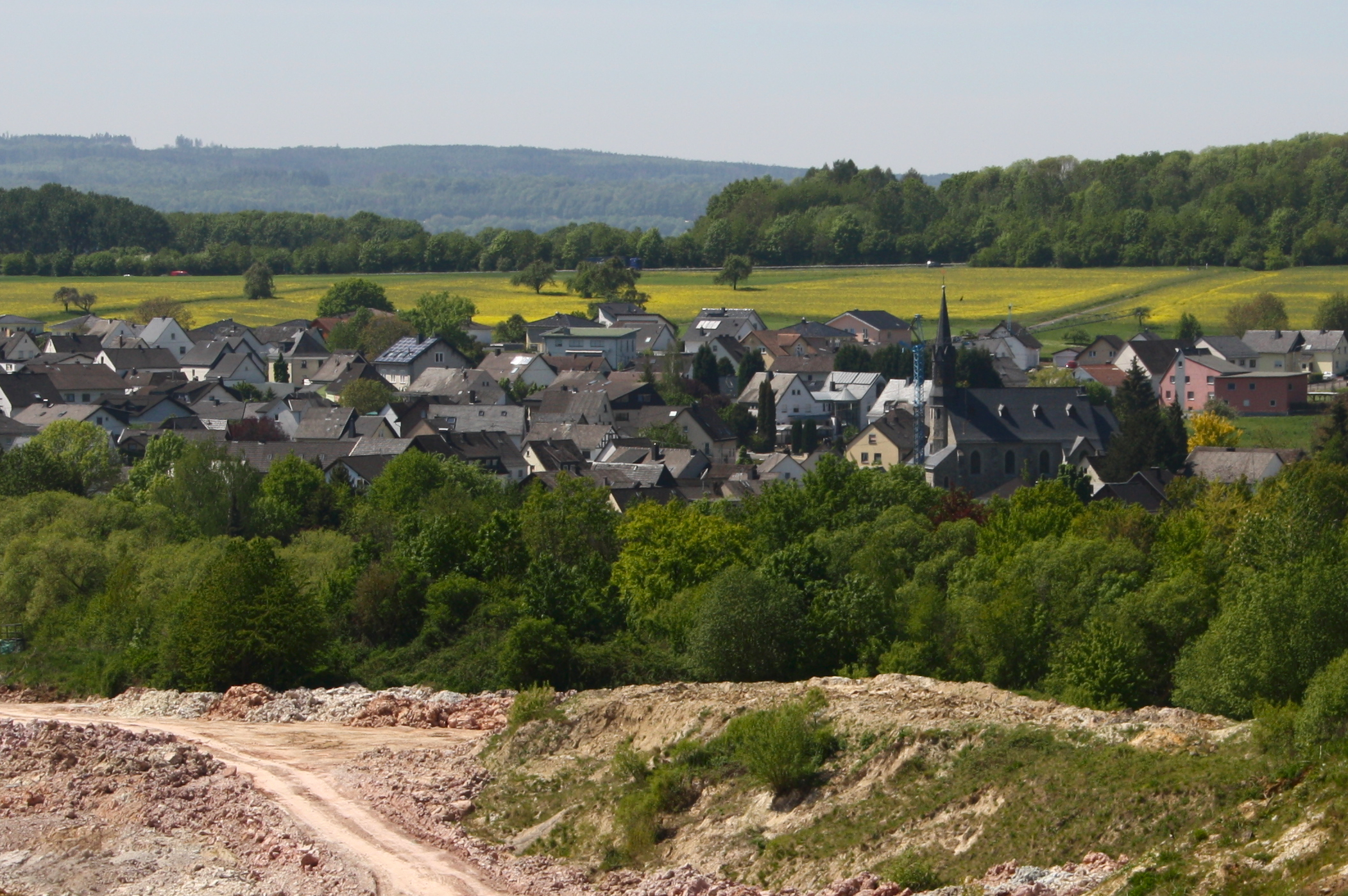

- Coat of arms

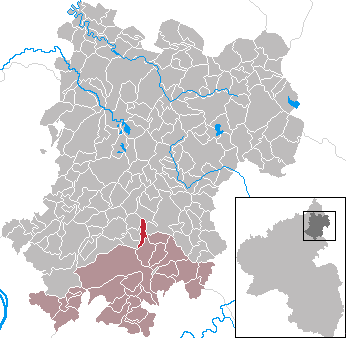
- Location of Boden within Westerwaldkreis district
- Interactive map of Boden
- Location within Germany Location within Rhineland-Palatinate
- Coordinates: 50°28′22″N 7°51′32″E
- Country: Germany
- State: Rhineland-Palatinate
- District: Westerwaldkreis
- Municipal assoc.: Montabaur

Government
  - Mayor (2019–24): Peter Stamm

Area
  - Total: 2.3 km^{2} (0.89 sq mi)
- Elevation: 265 m (869 ft)

Population (2025-12-31)
  - Total: 681
  - Density: 300/km^{2} (770/sq mi)
- Time zone: UTC+01:00 (CET)
  - Summer (DST): UTC+02:00 (CEST)
- Postal codes: 56412
- Dialling codes: 02602
- Vehicle registration: WW
- Website: www.vg-montabaur.de

Boden (German pronunciation: [ˈboːdn̩]) is an Ortsgemeinde – a municipality belonging to a Verbandsgemeinde – in the Westerwaldkreis in Rhineland-Palatinate, Germany.

== Geography ==
=== Location ===
The municipality lies north of Bundesautobahn 3, five kilometres from Montabaur. Through Boden's rural area flows the Ahrbach. The municipality belongs to the Verbandsgemeinde of Montabaur, a kind of collective municipality.

=== Neighbouring communities ===
Abutting Boden are, among others, Ruppach-Goldhausen, Heiligenroth, Moschheim, Niederahr and Meudt.

== History ==
In 1211, Boden had its first documentary mention in the so-called Liber annalium iurium, in which were written down the Trier Archbishops’ extensive holdings. The first chapel was built in 1716. The Church of the Assumption (Maria Himmelfahrt), built between 1914 and 1916 gives the village the look that it has today. An important rôle was played in Boden's development by clay quarrying, whose effects can clearly be seen all around Boden.

=== Religion ===
Ruppach-Goldhausen is the parish's main seat.

== Politics ==
The municipal council is made up of 8 council members who were elected in a majority vote in a municipal election on 7 June 2009.

== Culture and sightseeing ==
=== Music ===
The Big Band Boden e.V. is jazz and swing orchestra based in Boden that performs both classical and contemporary music.

=== Sport ===
- The ASV Boden is the municipality's sport club, offering wrestling and gymnastics as sports.
- The Sportfreunde Boden e.V. are active in the areas of table tennis, badminton and athletics.

== Economy and infrastructure ==
Owing to its central location in western Germany and the well developed transport connections, Boden is easy to reach. Along the municipality runs Bundesstraße 255, linking Montabaur and Marburg. The nearest Autobahn interchange is Montabaur on the A 3 (Cologne–Frankfurt). The nearest InterCityExpress stop is the railway station at Montabaur on the Cologne-Frankfurt high-speed rail line. The Kannenbäckerstrasse links Boden to Neuhäusel and runs through the Kannenbäckerland.
