= Ebernhahn =

- Municipality
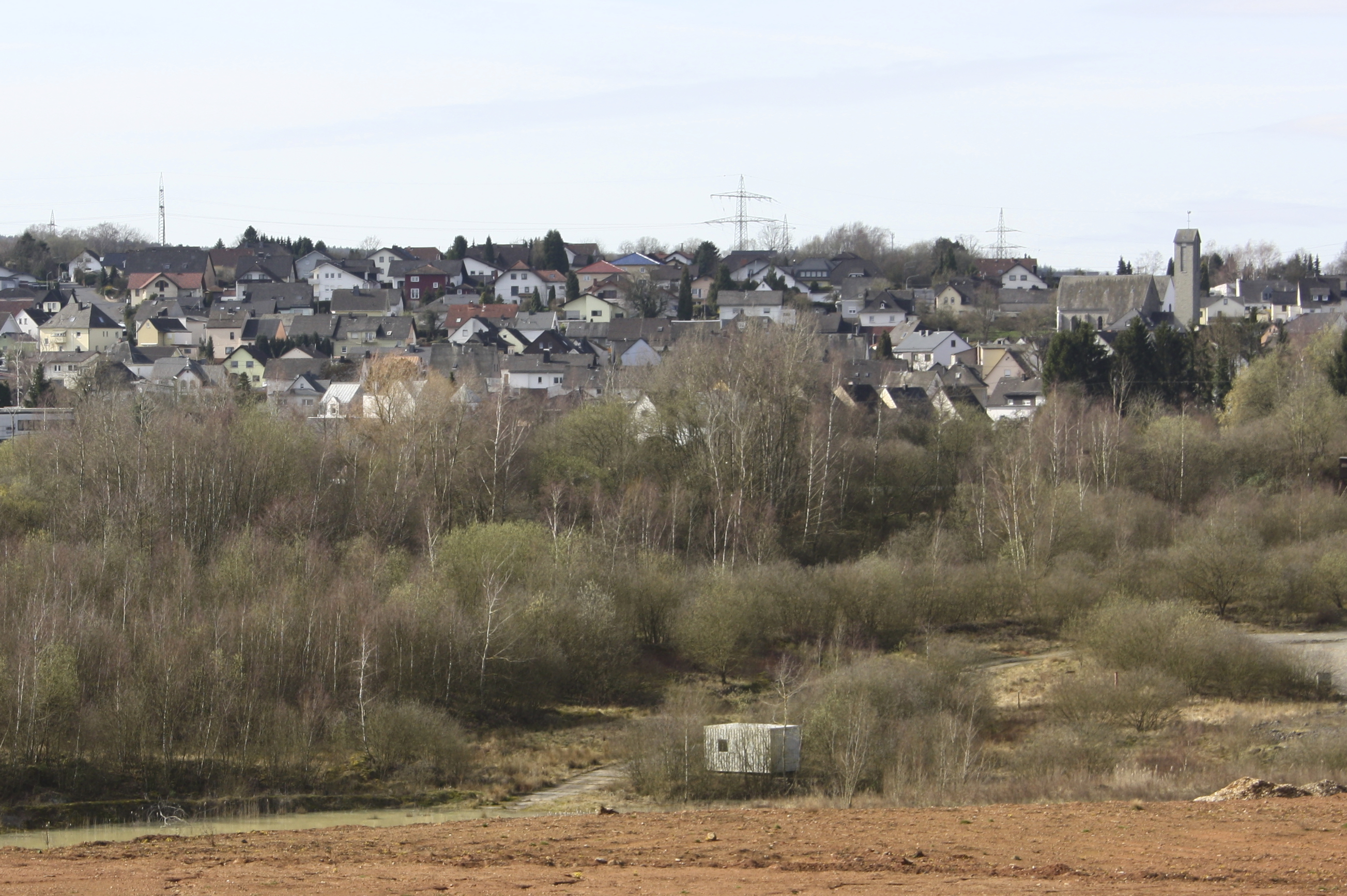

- Coat of arms

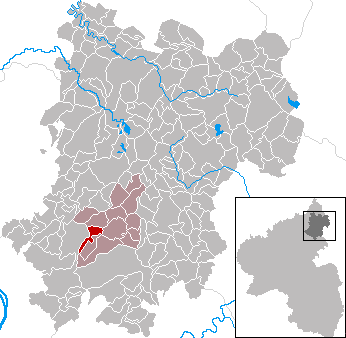
- Location of Ebernhahn within Westerwaldkreis district
- Interactive map of Ebernhahn
- Location within Germany Location within Rhineland-Palatinate
- Coordinates: 50°28′22″N 7°46′12″E
- Country: Germany
- State: Rhineland-Palatinate
- District: Westerwaldkreis
- Municipal assoc.: Wirges

Government
  - Mayor (2019–24): Thomas Schenkelberg

Area
  - Total: 3.33 km^{2} (1.29 sq mi)
- Elevation: 295 m (968 ft)

Population (2025-12-31)
  - Total: 1,341
  - Density: 403/km^{2} (1,040/sq mi)
- Time zone: UTC+01:00 (CET)
  - Summer (DST): UTC+02:00 (CEST)
- Postal codes: 56424
- Dialling codes: 02623
- Vehicle registration: WW

Ebernhahn is an Ortsgemeinde – a municipality belonging to a Verbandsgemeinde – in the Westerwaldkreis in Rhineland-Palatinate, Germany.

== History ==
First unequivocally mentioned in 1324 as Evernhan, Ebernhahn is counted among the newer Westerwald villages, and through the Middle Ages, its name hardly cropped up at all. After the devastating effects of the Thirty Years' War (1618–48), it counted, together with nearby Siershahn, only 42 inhabitants.

Ebernhahn's name comes from the Old High German word hag (“enclosure”), making the name's meaning, roughly, “belonging to the boar’s enclosure”; Eber is German for “boar”.

Ebernhahn was at first under the governance of the Electorate of Trier, later passing to the Duchy of Nassau and later still, in 1866, to Prussia. Since 1971 it has belonged to what was then the newly founded Verbandsgemeinde of Wirges, a kind of collective municipality, and since 1974 it has been part of the Westerwaldkreis whose district seat is in Montabaur.

In the mid 19th century, industry began to make inroads into the municipality, above all clay quarrying businesses. With industrialization, the municipality underwent, as did all communities in the Kannenbäckerland, a swift upswing in growth. While Ebernhahn counted only 241 inhabitants in 1818, by century's end, this had grown to some 500.

Since the quarrying businesses drew so many people from beyond Ebernhahn into the municipality, there was a necessary reaction to this in the municipality itself in the form of a developing transport trade. This gave rise to local passenger- and goods-moving businesses whose descendants can still be found today, long after clay quarrying ended.

On 11 March 1945, the municipality was bombed by the United States Army Air Forces; 52 people were killed and 32 buildings were thoroughly destroyed.

== Parish of Maria Empfängnis, Ebernhahn ==
=== Parish’s history ===
In 1902, Ebernhahn was made an autonomous chapel-parish. In 1921, Ebernhahn became a parish vicariate, and in 1964 it was raised to parish. Until April 1984, the parish had its own clergyman. Since then, it has shared one with the neighbouring parish of Dernbach. Given the increasing dearth of clergymen, Ebernhahn, and indeed Dernbach too, had to be grouped into the parish cluster (Pfarreienverband) of Wirges in 1996 while otherwise retaining its status as a parish.

=== Church’s history ===
In 1871, the first chapel was built in Ebernhahn. This was forsaken in 1911 for the new church, Maria Empfängnis. The church was expanded in 1958 and finished in 1968 with the belfry that it has today, which replaced the earlier onion-domed tower. In 1978, the interior was renovated. In 1997 extensive work was done on the church's exterior. Moreover, the rectory and sacristy were remodelled. In 2006 came a radical renovation and remodelling of the church's interior. A decisive architectural feature resulting from this is the shifting of the altar from the sanctuary forwards to the centre of a half-circle consisting of four segments, made out of old pews. On 4 November 2006, the new altar, whose capstone was made from the old altar, was consecrated by Abbot emeritus Dr. Thomas Denter.

=== Patron’s festival and church consecration ===
The parish patron's festival is on 8 December, the “high festival of the Mother of God conceived without original sin”. The church consecration festival is celebrated each year on the first Sunday in May.

=== municipality council ===
The council is made up of 17 council members, including the extraofficial mayor (Bürgermeister), who were elected in a municipal election on 7 June 2009.

	CDU	FWG Ebernhahn	WG - Schmidt	Total
2004	5	7	4	16 Seats

=== Village hymn ===
Since June 2006, Ebernhahn has had its own anthem, called Dou bess dott Dorf (Ebernhahn dialect for Du bist das Dorf – “You are the village”).

== Partnerships ==
Since 1973, there has existed a partnership between Ebernhahn and the French municipality of Marolles-les-Braults in the department of Sarthe. The official partnership meetings take place each year on Whitsun weekend, in Ebernhahn in even-numbered years and in Marolles-les-Braults in odd-numbered years. On 22 April 2007, the square outside the multi-purpose hall in Ebernhahn, after a thorough remodelling, was given the name Place Marolles as an expression of the partnership.

== Village life ==
Ebernhahn is well known far beyond the Westerwald for its roughly 30 established firms and its many clubs, among them the men's singing club Thalia, founded in 1880, the music club, founded in 1913, the Maria Empfängnis church choir, established in 1949 and the Wanderfreunde Ebernhahn (“Ebernhahn Hiking Friends”), which came into being in 1980.

The MGV "Thalia" gives its own concert every year on the Saturday before Palm Sunday at which other renowned choirs and ensembles are guests. Moreover, the MGV "Thalia" takes part in at least one important choir contest each year. The music club vies every autumn with three other orchestras in a collective concert held at a different place each time. Each year, on the last weekend before the summer holidays, the music club gives an open-air serenade at the old village linden in the middle of the municipality. The church choir takes on the creation of the church year's high points, particularly at Easter, Corpus Christi and Christmas. Every summer there is an evening song event, likewise at the old village linden. All three musical clubs also hold combined church concerts in a perennial, loose cycle. The Wanderfreunde are represented weekly, nationally, and sometimes internationally, at many hiking events. Each year in August, the Wanderfreunde hold their own Internationale Volkswanderung. Furthermore, the Wanderfreunde invite everyone to an Advent Hike in December, linked every other year with the Krippenwanderung (“Manger Hike”), when under festive lighting, there are many Christmas mangers to be seen.

== Transport ==
There was a stop of the Engers-Au railway in Ebernhahn which is currently not in service, the nearest train stop nowadays is Wirges at the Lower Westerwald Railway. Ebernhahn is connected to the local bus network through the lines 421, 425, 427, 467, 485 and 958. Ebernhahn is located in the area of the transport association Verkehrsverbund Rhein-Mosel (VRM).
