= Leuterod =

- Municipality
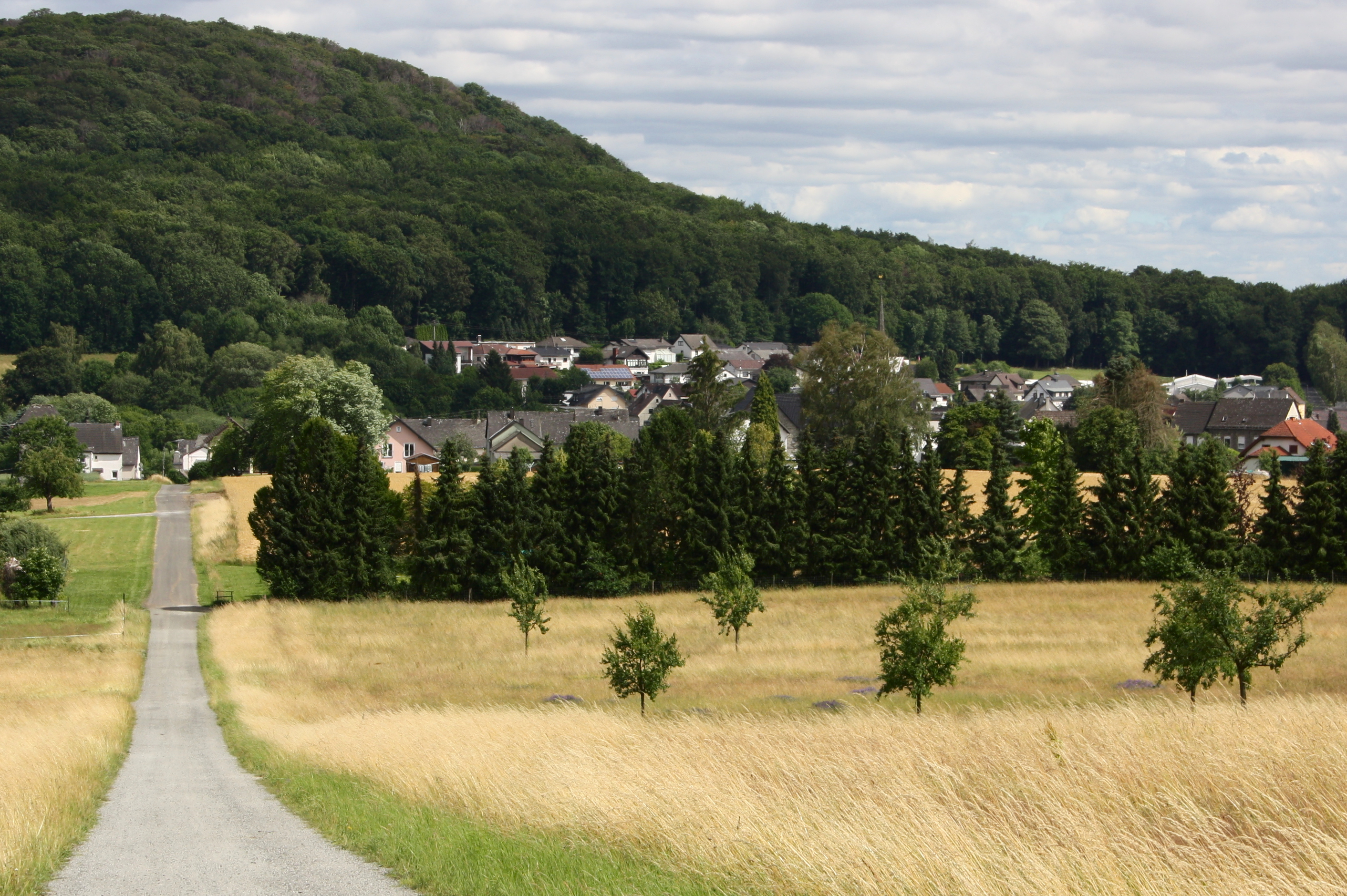

- Coat of arms

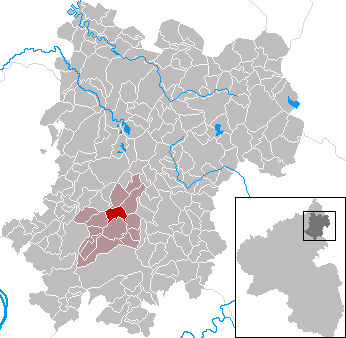
- Location of Leuterod within Westerwaldkreis district
- Interactive map of Leuterod
- Location within Germany Location within Rhineland-Palatinate
- Coordinates: 50°29′45″N 7°49′8″E
- Country: Germany
- State: Rhineland-Palatinate
- District: Westerwaldkreis
- Municipal assoc.: Wirges
- Subdivisions: 2

Government
  - Mayor (2019–24): Heidi Perpeet

Area
  - Total: 3.91 km^{2} (1.51 sq mi)
- Elevation: 305 m (1,001 ft)

Population (2025-12-31)
  - Total: 850
  - Density: 220/km^{2} (560/sq mi)
- Time zone: UTC+01:00 (CET)
  - Summer (DST): UTC+02:00 (CEST)
- Postal codes: 56244
- Dialling codes: 02602
- Vehicle registration: WW
- Website: www.leuterod.de

Leuterod is an Ortsgemeinde – a municipality belonging to a Verbandsgemeinde – in the Westerwaldkreis in Rhineland-Palatinate, Germany.

== Geography ==
=== Neighbouring municipalities ===
Leuterod's immediate neighbours are Moschheim in the southeast, Ötzingen in the northeast, Siershahn in the west, and Wirges in the southwest.

=== Location ===
Together with the first two municipalities named above, Leuterod borders in the east on the Malberg, whose elevation of 422 m above sea level makes it the most notable feature on the landscape north of Montabaur. The river Aubach divides the municipality into two zones (Bereiche in German): the Unterdorf (“Lower Village”) and the Insel (“Island”). The municipality belongs to the Wirges Verbandsgemeinde (the municipal association of Wirges).

=== Constituent municipalities ===
Leuterod's Ortsteile are Leuterod and Hosten.

== History ==
Leuterod's history reaches very far back. Finds on the Malberg confirm the existence of a Celtic hill fort (a place of worship) built there sometime between 800 and 600 BC.

In 1362, Leuterod had its first documentary mention as Wendel de lutereide. Somewhat earlier, in 1311, the outlying centre of Hosten had been mentioned as Hovesteden. Leuterod and Hosten lay at this time in the parish of Montabaur, whereby the Lords of St. Florin in Koblenz held the tithing rights.

In 1563, 12 “hearths” (Feuerstätten, that is to say, families) were counted in Leuterod. One hundred and twenty years later, owing to the frightful aftermath of the Thirty Years' War, there was only one left. According to Sagas, the municipality was utterly destroyed at this time and then built once more on a different spot. The Altendorfer Weg, according to the saga, is supposedly the road to the village's former site.

Until 1803, Leuterod belonged to the Electorate of Trier, when it passed to the Duchy of Nassau, and thereby also to Prussia in 1866.

Moreover, it worth mentioning is that by 1563, a hereditary mill (gristmill) was mentioned in the municipality.

== Politics ==
The municipal council is made up of 13 council members, including the extraofficial mayor (Bürgermeister), who was elected in a majority vote in a municipal election on 13 June 2004.

== Economy and infrastructure ==
=== Transport ===
East of the municipality runs Bundesstraße 255, linking Montabaur and Rennerod. The nearest Autobahn interchanges are Mogendorf and Montabaur, both on the A 3 (Cologne–Frankfurt), both 5 km away each. The nearest InterCityExpress stop is the railway station at Montabaur on the Cologne-Frankfurt high-speed rail line.

=== Clubs ===
- Förderverein der Freiwilligen Feuerwehr (Volunteer Fire Brigade Promotional Club)
- Männergesangverein Eintracht (men's singing club, “Harmony”)
- Sportverein
- Theaterverein
- Katholische Frauengemeinschaft (Catholic women's community)
- Kirchenchor St. Leonhard (church choir)
- Kirmesgesellschaft (kermis community)
