= Niedersayn =

- Municipality
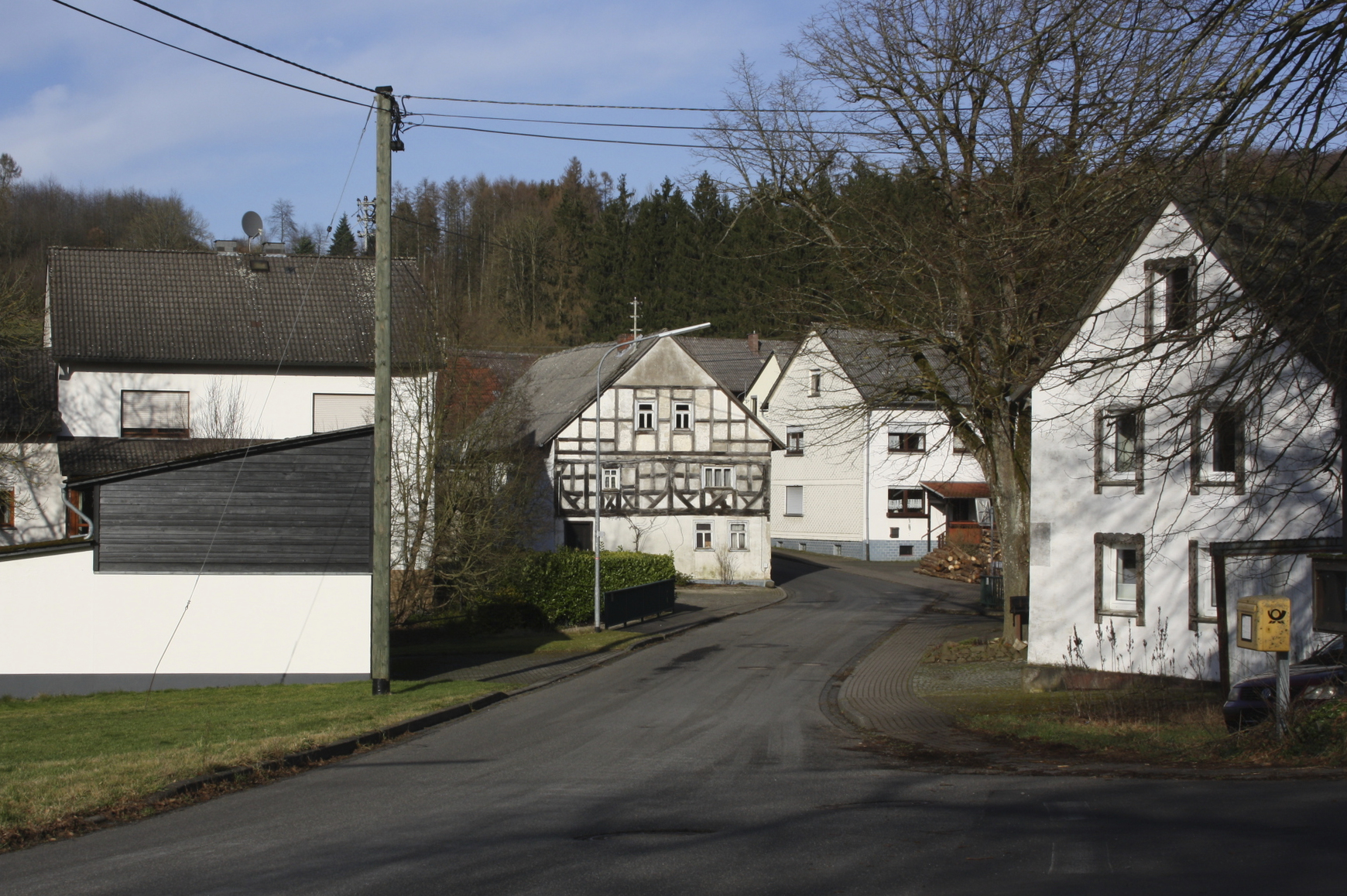

- Coat of arms

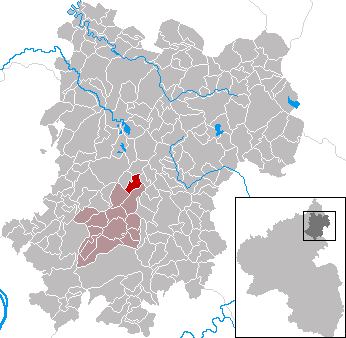
- Location of Niedersayn within Westerwaldkreis district
- Interactive map of Niedersayn
- Location within Germany Location within Rhineland-Palatinate
- Coordinates: 50°31′49″N 7°49′55″E
- Country: Germany
- State: Rhineland-Palatinate
- District: Westerwaldkreis
- Municipal assoc.: Wirges
- Subdivisions: 3

Government
  - Mayor (2019–24): Günter Anton Kober

Area
  - Total: 2.82 km^{2} (1.09 sq mi)
- Elevation: 340 m (1,120 ft)

Population (2025-12-31)
  - Total: 163
  - Density: 57.8/km^{2} (150/sq mi)
- Time zone: UTC+01:00 (CET)
  - Summer (DST): UTC+02:00 (CEST)
- Postal codes: 56244
- Dialling codes: 02602
- Vehicle registration: WW
- Website: www.niedersayn.de

Niedersayn is an Ortsgemeinde – a community belonging to a Verbandsgemeinde – in the Westerwaldkreis in Rhineland-Palatinate, Germany.

== Geography ==
=== Location ===
The community lies north of Montabaur on the river Sayn. Since 1971 it has belonged to what was then the newly founded Verbandsgemeinde of Wirges, a kind of collective municipality. Its seat is in the like-named town.

=== Constituent communities ===
Niedersayn's Ortsteile are Karnhöfen, Blaumhöfen and Niedersayn.

== History ==
In 1277, Niedersayn had its first documentary mention under the name Langesain.

== Politics ==
The municipal council is made up of 7 council members, including the extraofficial mayor (Bürgermeister), who were elected in a majority vote in a municipal election on 13 June 2004.

== Economy and infrastructure ==
East of the community runs Bundesstraße 255, linking Montabaur and Rennerod, and also Bundesstraße 8. The nearest Autobahn interchange is Montabaur on the A 3 (Cologne–Frankfurt), some 3 km away. The nearest InterCityExpress stop is the railway station at Montabaur on the Cologne-Frankfurt high-speed rail line.
