= Wirges (Verbandsgemeinde) =

Municipality in Rhineland-Palatinate, Germany

- Verbandsgemeinde
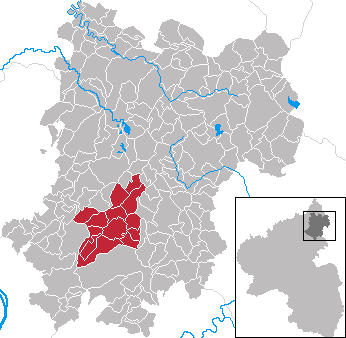
- Location of Wirges within Westerwaldkreis district
- Interactive map of Wirges
- Location within Germany Location within Rhineland-Palatinate
- Coordinates: 50°28′N 7°48′E
- Country: Germany
- State: Rhineland-Palatinate
- District: Westerwaldkreis
- Seat: Wirges
- Subdivisions: 12 municipalities

Area
  - Total: 56.44 km^{2} (21.79 sq mi)

Population (2025-12-31)
  - Total: 20,261
  - Density: 359.0/km^{2} (929.8/sq mi)
- Time zone: UTC+01:00 (CET)
  - Summer (DST): UTC+02:00 (CEST)
- Website: www.wirges.de

Wirges is a Verbandsgemeinde ("collective municipality") in the district Westerwaldkreis, in Rhineland-Palatinate, Germany. The seat of the Verbandsgemeinde is in Wirges.

The Verbandsgemeinde Wirges consists of the following Ortsgemeinden ("local municipalities"):

1. Bannberscheid
2. Dernbach
3. Ebernhahn
4. Helferskirchen
5. Leuterod
6. Mogendorf
7. Moschheim
8. Niedersayn
9. Ötzingen
10. Siershahn
11. Staudt
12. Wirges
