= Helferskirchen =

- Municipality
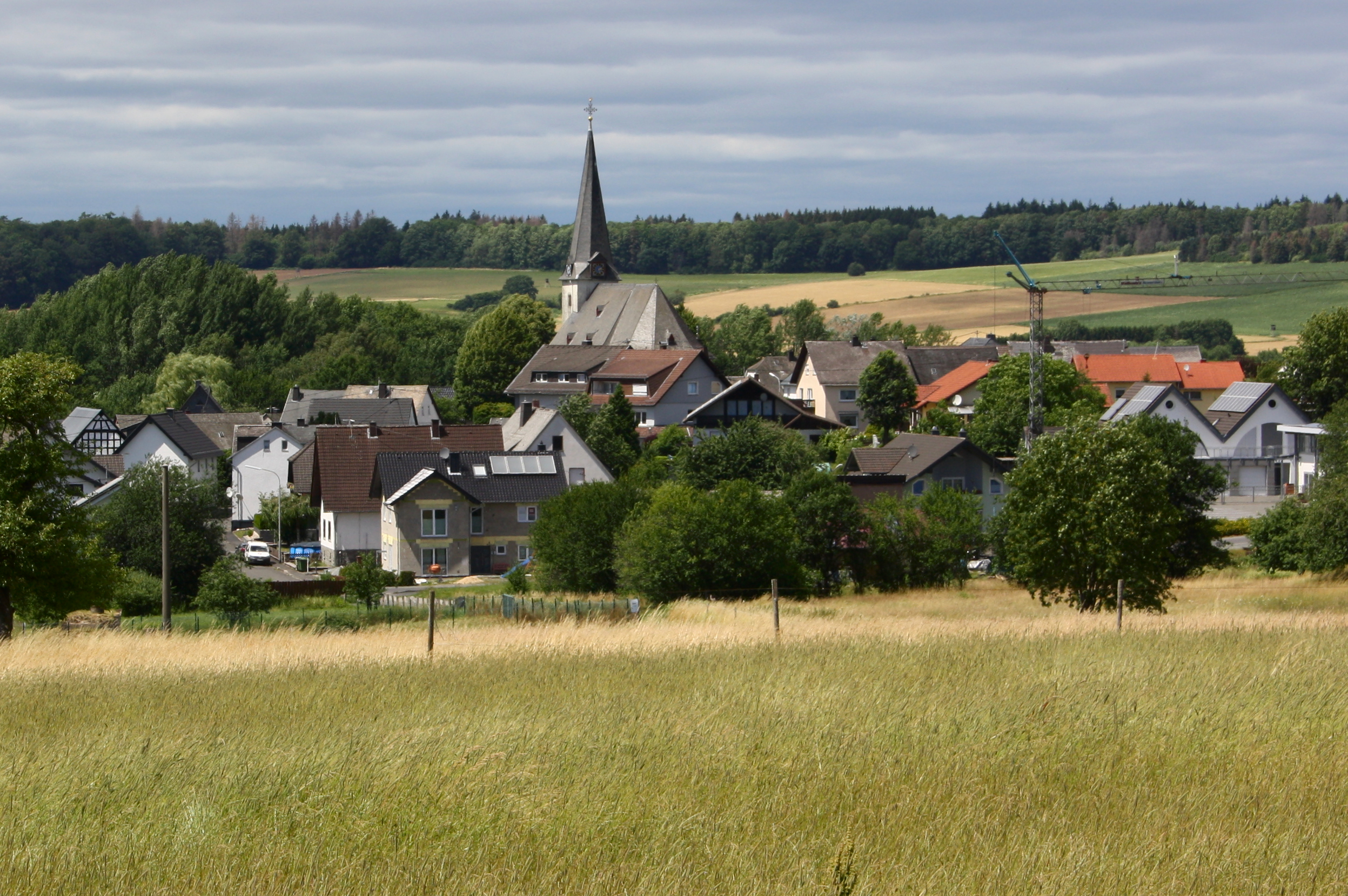

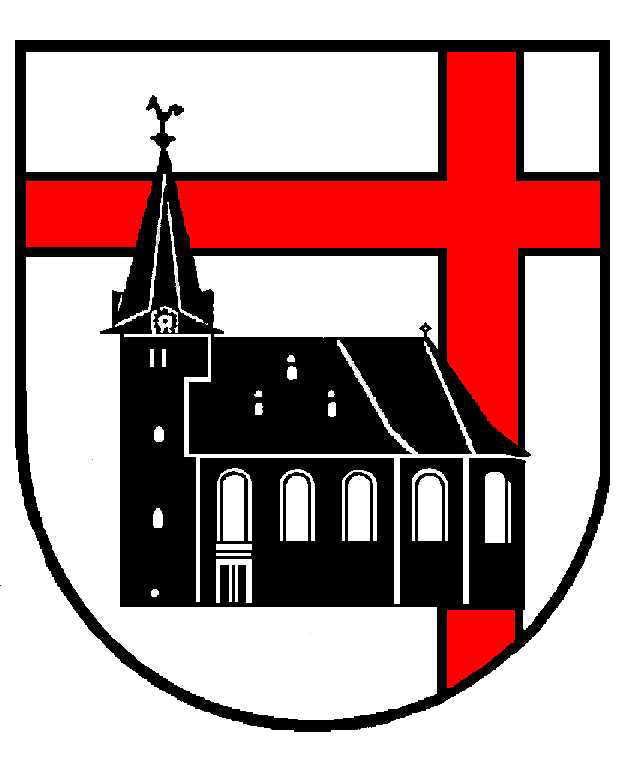
- Coat of arms

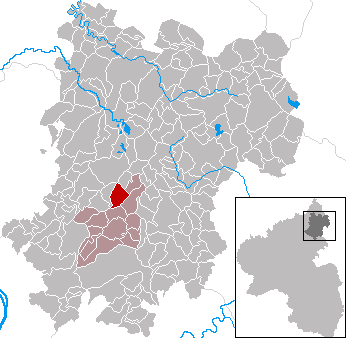
- Location of Helferskirchen within Westerwaldkreis district
- Interactive map of Helferskirchen
- Location within Germany Location within Rhineland-Palatinate
- Coordinates: 50°30′47″N 7°48′56″E
- Country: Germany
- State: Rhineland-Palatinate
- District: Westerwaldkreis
- Municipal assoc.: Wirges

Government
  - Mayor (2019–24): Anette Marciniak-Mielke

Area
  - Total: 5.00 km^{2} (1.93 sq mi)
- Elevation: 330 m (1,080 ft)

Population (2025-12-31)
  - Total: 1,255
  - Density: 251/km^{2} (650/sq mi)
- Time zone: UTC+01:00 (CET)
  - Summer (DST): UTC+02:00 (CEST)
- Postal codes: 56244
- Dialling codes: 02626
- Vehicle registration: WW
- Website: www.helferskirchen.de

Helferskirchen is an Ortsgemeinde – a community belonging to a Verbandsgemeinde – in the Westerwaldkreis in Rhineland-Palatinate, Germany.

== Geography ==
The village lies between the Kannenbäckerland and the Westerwald Lake District (Westerwälder Seenplatte). Since 1971 it has belonged to what was then the newly founded Verbandsgemeinde of Wirges, a kind of collective municipality.

== History ==
In 1277, Helferskirchen had its first documentary mention under the name Langesain in connection with Niedersayn, Karnhöfen, Kuhnhöfen and Blaumhöfen.

== Politics ==
=== Community council ===
The council is made up of 17 council members, including the extraofficial mayor (Bürgermeister), who were elected in a majority vote in a municipal election on 7 June 2009.

=== Coat of arms ===
The community's arms take the shape of a late Gothic rounded shield with a horizontal upper edge and sides meeting it at right angles. Its basic tincture is silver. In red, the Trier cross can be seen, and in black is a stylized representation of the church after its expansion in 1769, which is how it still looks today. The layout and tower, which have been preserved from the early 13th century, characterize the church as an old fortress church in the village's core.

== Economy and infrastructure ==
East of the community runs Bundesstraße 255, linking Montabaur and Rennerod, as well as Bundesstraße 8. The nearest Autobahn interchange is Mogendorf on the A 3 (Cologne–Frankfurt), some 7 km away. The nearest InterCityExpress stop is the railway station at Montabaur on the Cologne-Frankfurt high-speed rail line.
