= Moschheim =

- Municipality
- Coat of arms

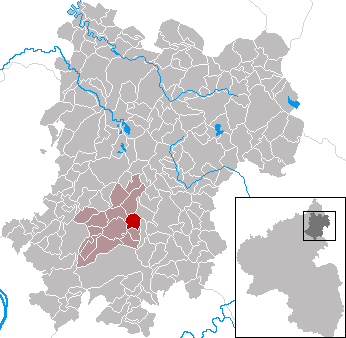
- Location of Moschheim within Westerwaldkreis district
- Interactive map of Moschheim
- Location within Germany Location within Rhineland-Palatinate
- Coordinates: 50°28′57″N 7°50′30″E
- Country: Germany
- State: Rhineland-Palatinate
- District: Westerwaldkreis
- Municipal assoc.: Wirges

Government
  - Mayor (2019–24): Norbert Nöller

Area
  - Total: 3.44 km^{2} (1.33 sq mi)
- Elevation: 272 m (892 ft)

Population (2025-12-31)
  - Total: 767
  - Density: 223/km^{2} (577/sq mi)
- Time zone: UTC+01:00 (CET)
  - Summer (DST): UTC+02:00 (CEST)
- Postal codes: 56424
- Dialling codes: 02602
- Vehicle registration: WW
- Website: www.moschheim.de

Moschheim is an Ortsgemeinde – a community belonging to a Verbandsgemeinde – in the Westerwaldkreis in Rhineland-Palatinate, Germany.

== Geography ==
The community lies north of Montabaur on the Kannenbäckerstraße (“Jug Bakers’ Road”, a reference to the local ceramics industry). The community has since 1971 belonged to what was then the newly founded Verbandsgemeinde of Wirges, a kind of collective municipality. Its seat is in the like-named town.

In the north of the municipal area stands the Malberg, which at 422 m above sea level is one of the greatest elevations in the area.

== History ==
In 1362, Moschheim had its first documentary mention.

== Politics ==
The municipal council is made up of 13 council members, including the extraofficial mayor (Bürgermeister), who were elected in a majority vote in a municipal election on 13 June 2004.

== Economy and infrastructure ==
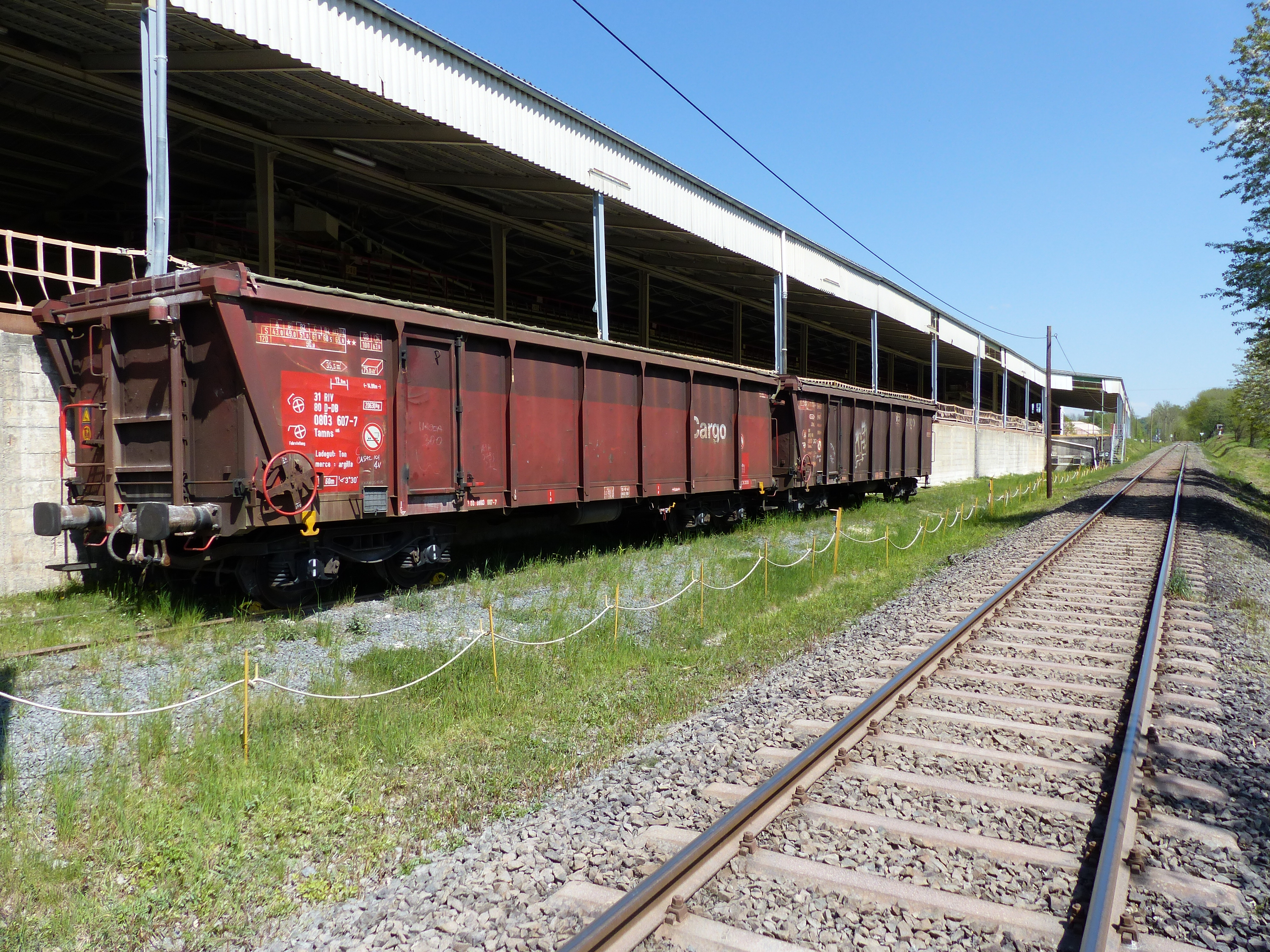
Fright trains still operate in Moschheim

The public local bus lines 424, 463, 481 and 958 connect Moschheim to the public transport. Moschheim.is located in the transport association Verkehrsverbund Rhein-Mosel (VRM) in the fare zone number 413.

East of the community runs Bundesstraße 255, linking Montabaur and Rennerod. The nearest Autobahn interchange is Montabaur on the A 3 (Cologne–Frankfurt), some 3 km away.

Moschheim had a station at the Cross Westerwald railway (Montabaur - Wallmerod - Westerburg - Rennerod - Herborn), nowadays this line between Montabaur and Wallmerod is only in service for fright traffic, from Fehl-Ritzhausen to Rennerod station touristic Railbike tours take place organized by the interest group IG Westerwald-Querbahn e. V. (IWQ), IWQ has organized special train rides from Montabaur to Wallmerod in 2005, 2006, 2007 and 2010.

The nearest access to train service is at Wirges on the Limburg-Staffel–Siershahn railway (RB29).

The nearest InterCityExpress stop is the railway station at Montabaur on the Cologne-Frankfurt high-speed rail line.
