= Herborn–Montabaur railway =

Railway line in Germany

Overview
- Line number: 3722 (Herborn–Erdbach); 3747 (Erdbach–Montabaur)
- Locale: Hesse, Rhineland-Palatinate, Germany
- Termini: Herborn (Dillkr); Montabaur

Service
- Route number: 425 (1981)

Technical
- Line length: 74.3 km (46.2 mi)
- Track gauge: 1,435 mm (4 ft 8 1/2 in) standard gauge
- Operating speed: 50 kilometres per hour (31 mph)
- Maximum incline: 2.0%

The Herborn–Montabaur railway, also known in German as the Westerwaldquerbahn ("cross Westerwald railway"), is a branch line in the German states of Hesse and Rhineland-Palatinate. Opened between 1906 and 1910, the line originally ran from Herborn via Driedorf, Fehl-Ritzhausen, and Westerburg to Montabaur. Passenger service was gradually discontinued from 1959 onwards. Today, only the section between Wallmerod and Montabaur remains in operation for freight traffic.

== History ==
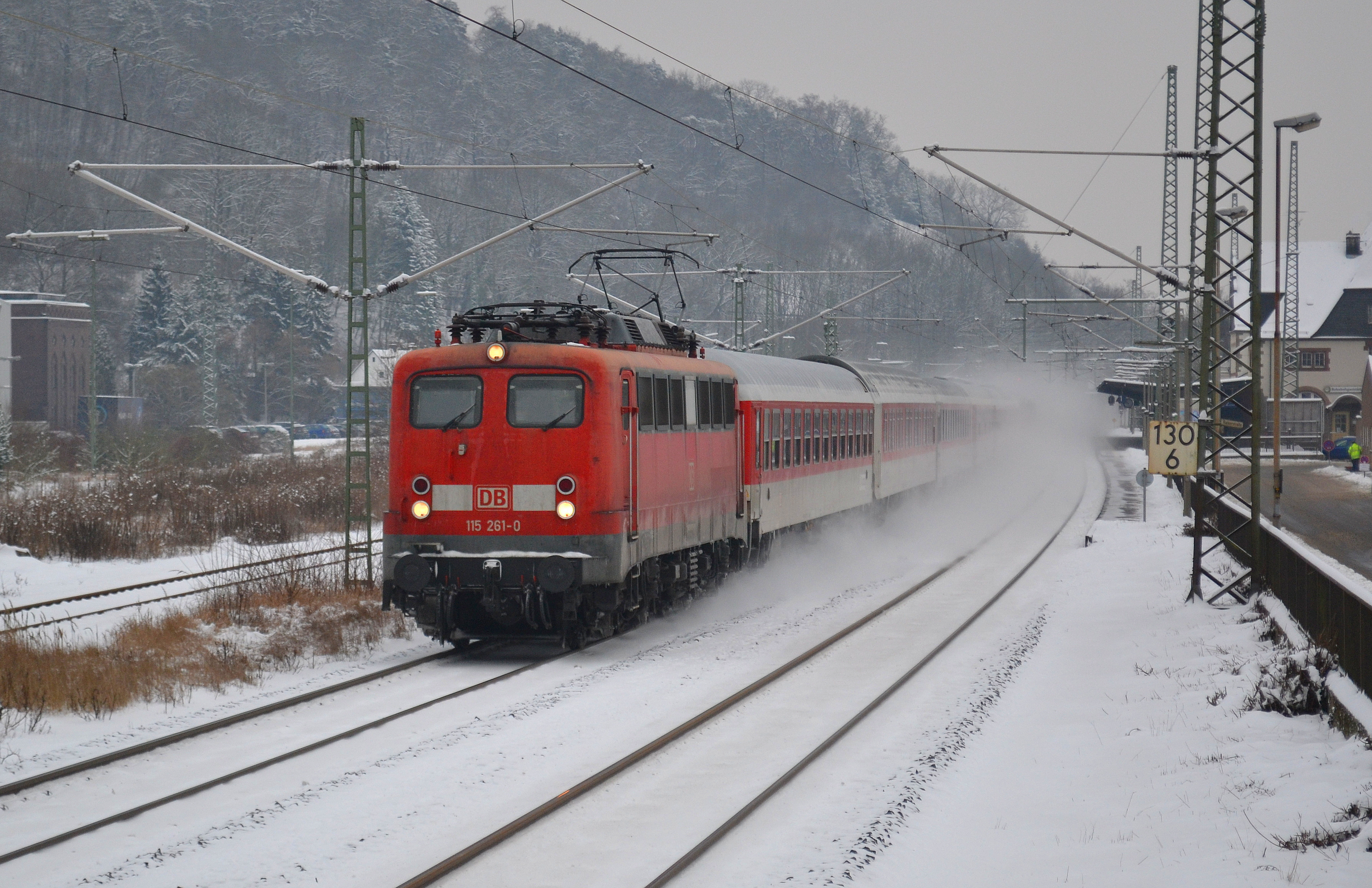
Herborn (Dillkr) station

Roth station

Schönbach station

As early as the 1850s, the Duchy of Nassau desired a railway connection from Herborn via Rennerod to Hadamar, which would connect there to other planned interregional railway lines. This plan, as well as others from the 1870s, failed to materialise, partly due to a lack of financial resources or support from the participating states. Renewed plans for the Westerwaldquerbahn emerged at the end of the 1880s after the completion of the Limburg–Altenkirchen railway. This was followed by lengthy disputes over the precise route and numerous proposals for different alignments. Several competing railway committees attempted to achieve a route that would be beneficial to the interests of the communities involved. As with all railway projects in the Westerwald, the motivation was to improve access to the region's raw material resources (clay, basalt, iron ore, and lignite). The project aimed to connect the processing plants that had sprung up at these mining sites, improve transportation for the region's numerous migrant workers to the industrial centers, and generally boost the economic standing of the impoverished region. Furthermore, Marienberg, as the administrative center of the Upper Westerwald district, also desired a rail connection. The railway divisions of Cologne and Frankfurt also disagreed on the best location for the connecting stations. In February 1896, an agreement was reached that the planned route should run from Herborn via Erbach or Westerburg towards Siershahn or Montabaur. The new line was now to be built as a state-owned branch line; the previously considered options of a narrow-gauge or private railway were no longer under discussion. The planned construction costs were estimated at approximately 10 million marks.

On 20 May 1898, the Prussian Parliament approved the construction of a railway from Herborn to a junction with the Limburg–Altenkirchen railway, yet to be determined, and further west to Montabaur or Siershahn on the Staffel–Siershahn railway. Marienberg was also to be served by a short branch line. Construction costs to Westerburg were estimated at only around seven million marks this time, with the municipalities along the route contributing approximately 0.5 million marks. Despite initial preliminary work, a route satisfactory to all parties involved could still not be agreed upon. Initially, three cross-connection lines between the Limburg–Altenkirchen railway line and the Engers–Au or Staffel–Siershahn lines were discussed. After the Selters–Hachenburg light railway opened in 1901, only two were considered. However, the Herborn–Rennerod route was now undisputed, and construction began there in 1903.

=== Railway construction and opening in several stages ===
The railway line was originally planned to be completed within 26 months, despite the need to build two tunnels and several large bridges. Actual construction began in September 1903, following problems such as acquiring the necessary land. Bad weather, subsoil issues, and landslides caused further delays. By May 1905, the earthworks, carried out mainly by Italians, were largely complete. However, the 1905 miners' strike in the Ruhr region led to a shortage of building materials. The opening ceremony for the completed Herborn–Driedorf section took place on 30 April 1906, and regular service began the following day. The extension from Driedorf to Rennerod was opened on 1 October 1906, after the completion of the remaining work at Rennerod station.

The final decision to locate the junction station at Westerburg instead of Erbach was made in 1904/1905. Simultaneously with the construction of the line towards Westerburg, work began on the branch line from Fehl-Ritzhausen to Marienberg. This also required the construction of elaborate bridges. The new Rennerod–Westerburg section was officially opened on 16 July 1907. However, the originally planned construction costs were exceeded by almost one million marks. This was due to delays as well as a slightly altered route on the Rennerod–Westerburg section.

The extension from Westerburg to Montabaur was approved in 1905, and the necessary planning work began immediately. This was completed in 1908, and construction began on the final section. Due to the terrain, the route was considerably simpler, and elaborate engineering structures were unnecessary. Only the flyover to the Limburg–Altenkirchen line and several road bridges had to be built. The final section was opened on 1 June 1910. A resident of Wallmerode, Karl Hutter, donated a large sum of money to the railway, so the originally planned route was rerouted in a wide arc to the southeast towards his home village. The initial construction costs for the final section, at approximately 3.5 million marks, were exceeded by about 0.5 million marks. The municipalities and districts contributed 315,000 marks to the railway construction.

Further construction of the line towards the Rhine or Lahn failed for financial reasons, despite the efforts of various committees. Nevertheless, some preliminary work had been carried out before 1914, but after the outbreak of the First World War, all such projects could not be continued.

=== Operation until 1945 ===
The foreseen economic upswing resulting from the railway construction materialised. Numerous new businesses were established, and the economic decline of the High Westerwald region was halted. The northeastern section, up to Westerburg, saw higher transport volumes than the section from Westerburg to Montabaur. Here, freight traffic was primarily limited to the shipment of stone and clay. In 1913 – the year with the highest traffic volume – approximately 125,000 tons of goods were received and around 375,000 tons were shipped along the entire route. During the same period, six pairs of passenger trains ran daily; however, there were no through trains, and passengers had to change trains in Westerburg. Additional pairs of trains also operated on shorter sections of the line.

The closure of seven of the eight lignite mines in the 1920s led to a noticeable decrease in transport volume. Only the Alexandria mine remained in operation. Freight traffic was now primarily handled by the southern section of the line, with its clay pits, as further quarries in the northeastern area ceased production. The basic timetable remained similar in the 1930s, although four through trains ran on the Herborn–Westerburg section and five on the Westerburg–Montabaur section. Occasionally, some of these trains continued beyond Montabaur to Siershahn station. Unlike many other lines, the timetable remained largely unchanged during the Second World War.

Launch sites for V-2 rockets were built in the Westerwald region during the Second World War. Towards the end of the war in 1944/1945, the railway facilities along the line were therefore bombed several times, but damage only occurred at Westerburg station, which was largely destroyed. Numerous residential buildings along the railway line were destroyed by the attacks.

=== After the Second World War ===
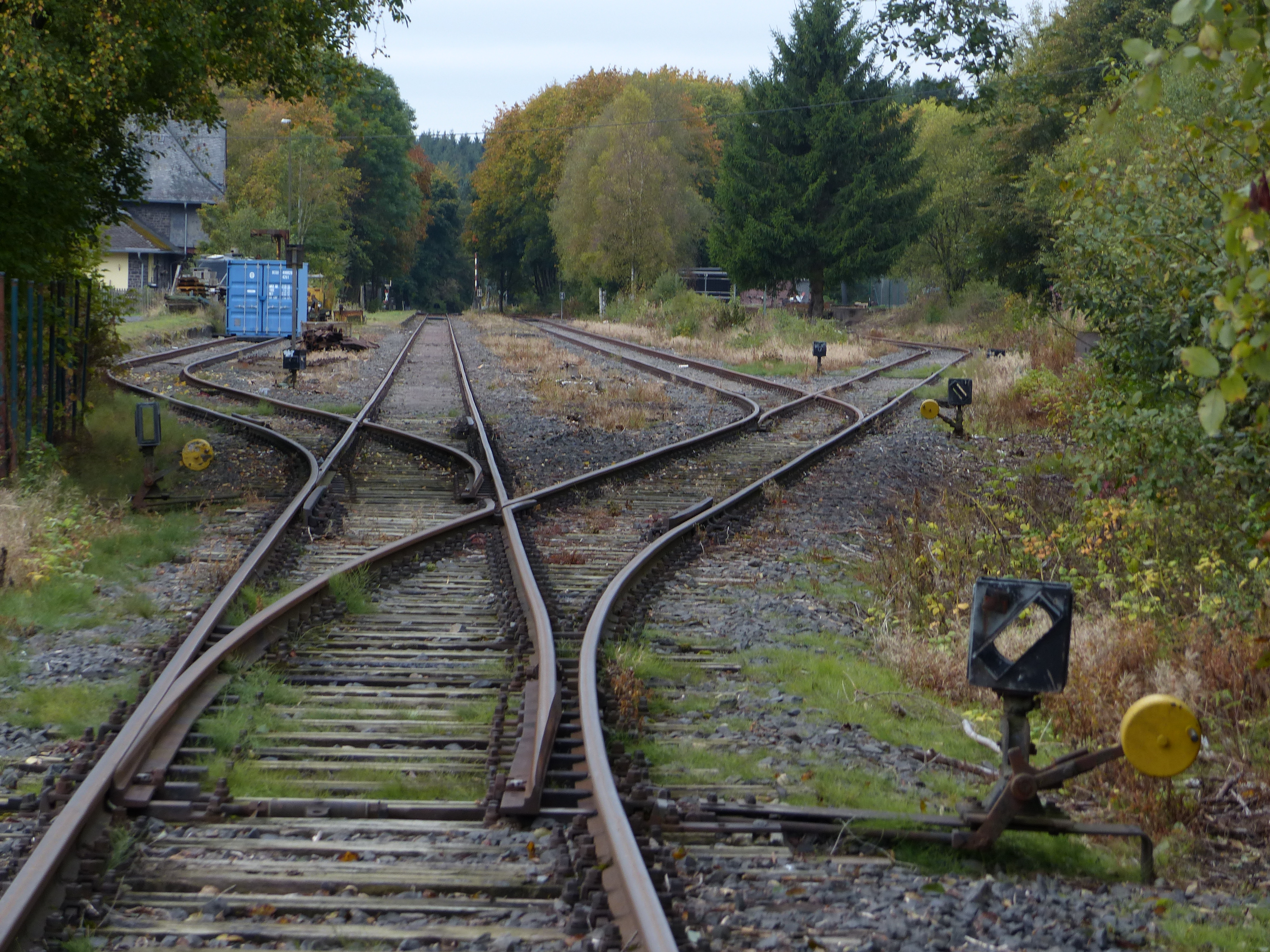
Tracks in Rennerod station

Hülsbachtalbrücke Westerburg

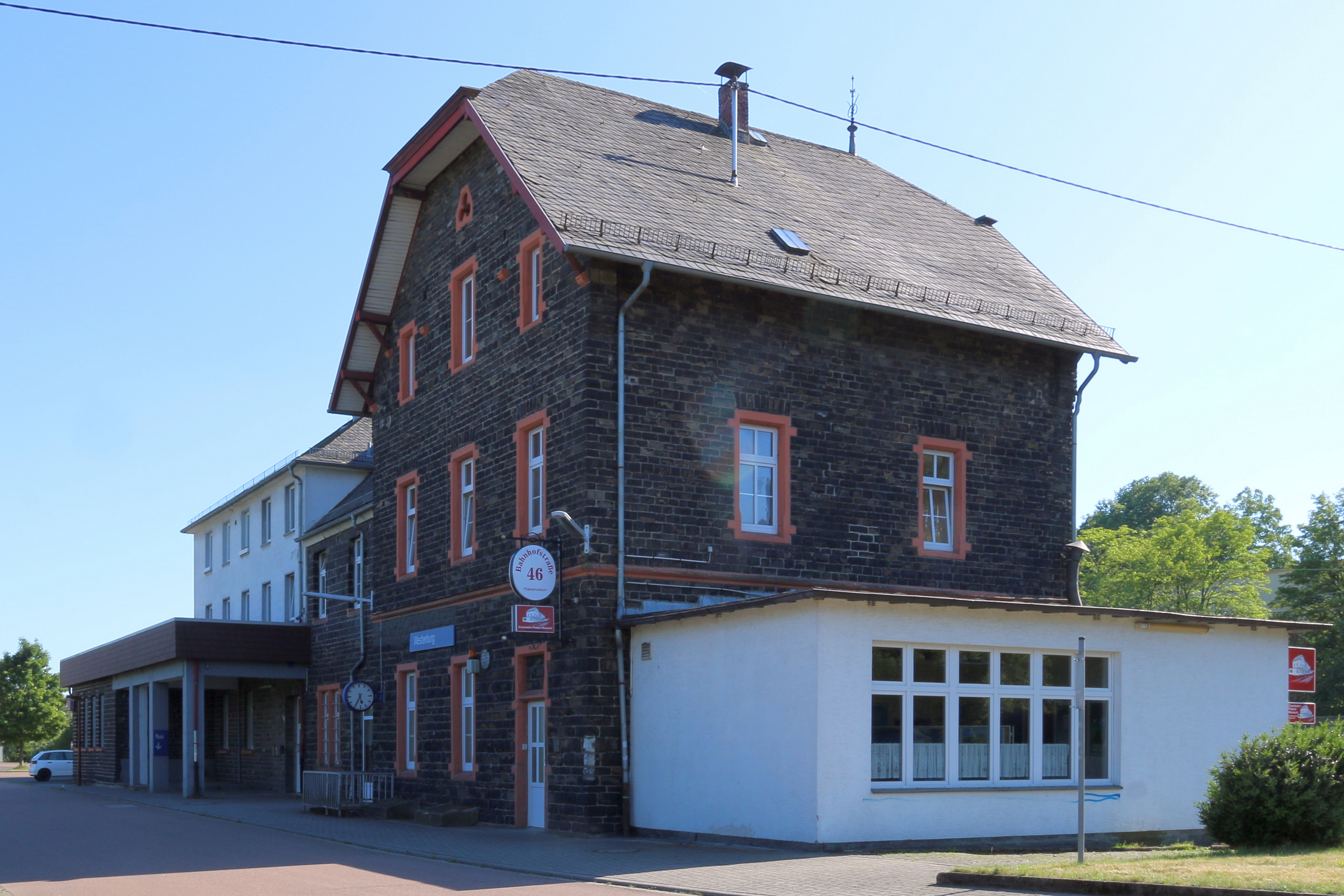
Westerburg station, on the former tracks and platforms of Westerwaldquerbahn, a park and ride lot has been consteucted

After the Second World War, the French occupying forces assigned all railway lines in the northern part of their occupation zone to the Mainz railway division, including the Herborn–Montabaur railway between Montabaur and Rehe in October 1945. The timetable was also drastically reduced after the end of the war.

During the construction of the Krombachtal dam from 1946 to 1949, the railway line was rerouted northwards in the area of the dam.

From the 1950s onwards, there was a decline in transport for both passengers and freight. At least in passenger traffic, the decline was temporarily halted by the introduction of VT 95 railbuses and the establishment of new stations. The line was now shown in a timetable under timetable number 251 f, but there were still hardly any through train connections; passengers still had to change trains in Westerburg. The Montabaur–Westerburg section was converted to simplified branch line operation on 2 November 1954, followed by the Westerburg–Fehl-Ritzhausen section on 22 May 1955, which was extended to Rennerod on 1 June 1969. In addition, Hergenroth station was downgraded to a Haltepunkt (roughly "halt") in 1959, and Kölbingen station followed in 1967.

=== Decline from 1959 onwards ===
| from | to | closure of passenger services | closure of goods operations | closure of line |
|---|---|---|---|---|
| Herborn | Schönbach | 31 May 1980 | 27 September 1985 | |
| Schönbach | Steinringsberg | 22 May 1966 | 1 June 1984 | |
| Steinringsberg | Driedorf | 31 May 1959 | 1 June 1984 | |
| Driedorf | Mademühlen | 31 May 1959 | 1 April 1974 | |
| Mademühlen | Rennerod | 31 May 1959 | 1 January 1967 | |
| Rennerod | Westerburg | 30 May 1981 | 18 April 1995 | 25. April 1998 |
| Westerburg | Wallmerod | 30 May 1981 | 30 May 1985 | |
| Wallmerod | Montabaur | 30 May 1981 | operating | |

Passenger service between Steinringsberg and Rennerod was discontinued on 31 May 1959. The last lignite mine ceased operations in 1961, after which freight traffic on the section between the state border and Westerburg plummeted to a minimum. At Rehe station, for example, the total traffic volume for the entire year of 1957 was just under 300 tons, in addition to 260 tickets sold. Only a gravel plant near Hergenroth and the establishment of the Alsberg Barracks in Rennerod in 1957 provided the railway with any significant transport volume in this area. Passenger service on the Schönbach–Steinringsberg section was discontinued on 22 May 1966. A further shift of passengers to bus services occurred due to direct bus connections between Rennerod and Herborn, which were printed in the timetable. Freight traffic on the Mademühlen–Rennerod section, which had practically ceased to exist, was discontinued on 1 January 1967, due to the poor condition of the track, after years of track maintenance having been reduced to an absolute minimum. Since then, the line has been divided into two sections.

With the gradual dissolution of the Mainz Federal Railway Division in 1971/72, responsibility for the section between Rennerod and just before Montabaur fell to the Frankfurt/Main Federal Railway Division on 1 January 1971.

On 13 August 1973, a spectacular accident occurred at Erdbach station. Due to the interference of unauthorised persons on the Rehe–Mademühlen section of the line, the handbrakes of 16 freight cars parked on the track were released, causing them to roll downhill. After 15 km (9.3 mi) and crossing 20 level crossings, they hit the buffer stop of the Erdbach switchback station, ran over it, and crashed into a house 50 m (160 ft) further on, killing a woman. As early as 13 December 1910, an inadequately braked freight train had run over the buffer stop at this location.

Freight train at Schönbach station (1980)

Freight service on the short section of track from Driedorf to Mademühlen ceased on 1 April 1974, and the line between Driedorf and Rennerod was subsequently dismantled. Passenger service between Herborn and Schönbach ended on 31 May 1980. Freight service from Herborn to Driedorf continued until 1 June 1984, after which only Schönbach was served from Herborn until 27 September 1985. The tracks were dismantled in 1985 and 1989/1990.

Passenger service on the southern section of the line, Rennerod–Westerburg–Montabaur, was discontinued on 30 May 1981. Freight service from Westerburg to Wallmerod continued until 25 September 1983. A cycle path along the former railway line was opened between Westerburg and Wallmerod in 1989; the tracks had been removed in 1987/1988. Although a freight forwarding company northeast of Rennerod station wanted to invest approximately DM 2.5 million in a new rail connection, this project was blocked by Deutsche Bahn in 1994. The Hülsbach Viaduct near Westerburg was closed to traffic on 18 April 1995, due to the dilapidation of one of its piers, thus also bringing the sporadic freight traffic on the Rennerod–Westerburg section to a halt. The only section of the line that escaped decline was Wallmerod–Montabaur, from where approximately 650,000 tonnes of clay were shipped annually, primarily to Italy, in the early 1990s. The tracks in this section were renewed in the spring of 1993. In the summer of 2000, the route within the town of Montabaur was changed when the station there was relocated to the newly built station on the Cologne–Frankfurt high-speed rail line.

=== Current operation ===
Loading tano on Wallmerod station

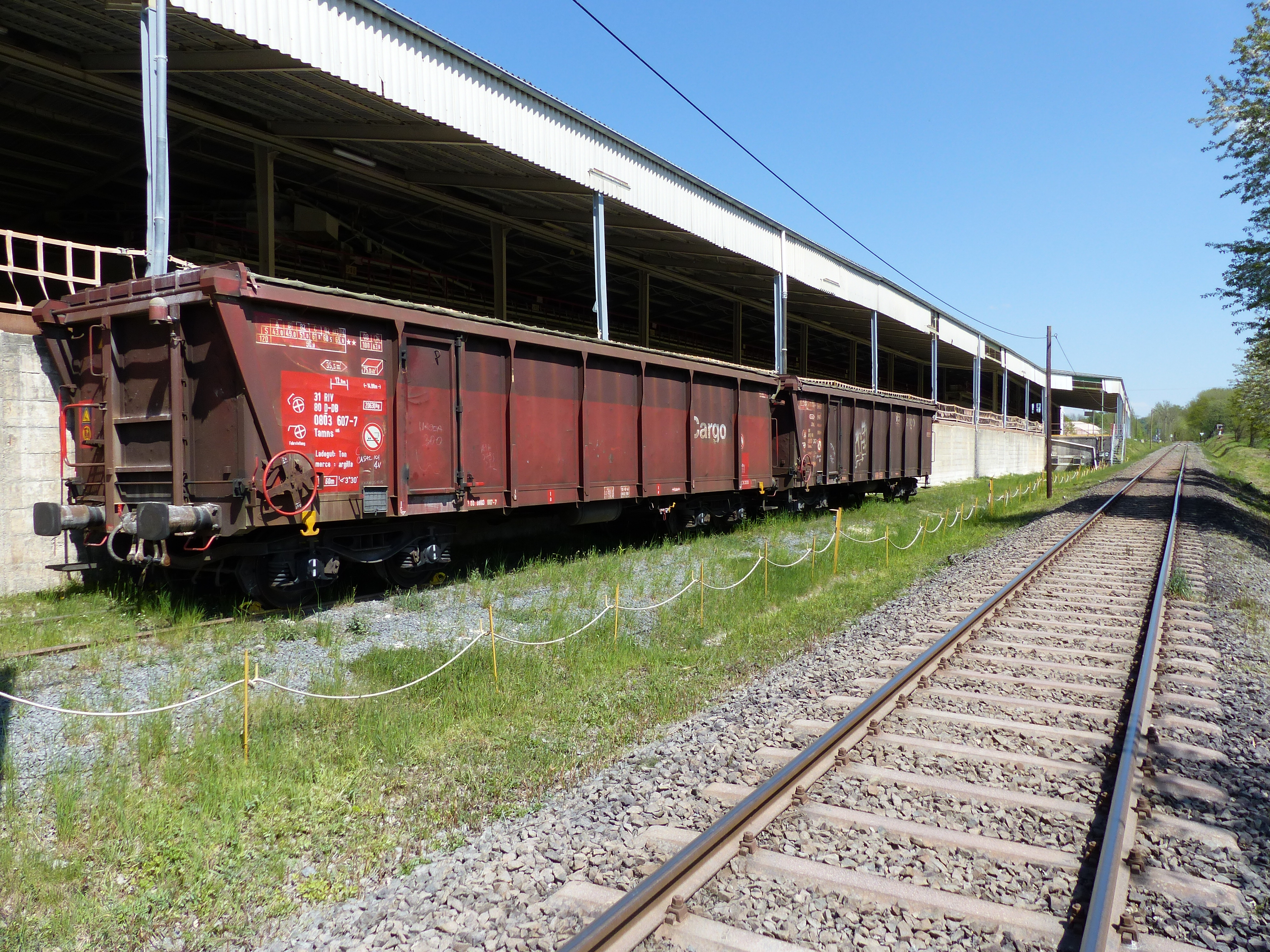
Moschheim loading station (2016)

Former Montabaur station

Fright trains in the new Montabaur station

Only the section between Wallmerod and Montabaur still serves freight traffic as part of DB InfraGO's infrastructure. DB Cargo transports clay from the clay pits around Wallmerod (including for Villeroy & Boch) in block trains. The line is operated using train control. The train controller is the Montabaur train dispatcher.

The interest group IG Westerwald-Querbahn e. V. (IWQ), founded in 2002, has leased the Westerburg–Rennerod section and is aiming for its phased restoration as a tourist railway. Since April 2014, rides on hand-operated railbikes have been operating on the 6 km (3.7 mi) section between Fehl-Ritzhausen and Rennerod, which is managed by the IWQ. Further expansion is planned for the coming years; by 2026, large sections of the line to Westerburg will have been cleared of vegetation and level crossings that had already been removed will have been reinstated.

Moschheim charging station (2016) Only the section between Wallmerod and Montabaur still serves freight traffic as part of DB InfraGO's infrastructure. DB Cargo transports clay from the clay pits around Wallmerod (including for Villeroy & Boch) in block trains. The line is operated using train control. The train controller is the Montabaur train dispatcher.

== Infrastructure ==
With the switchback in Erdbach, the two listed tunnels near Erdbach and in Schönbach, the three listed railway bridges, the fishbelly girder bridge in Burg, the Hülsbach viaduct in Westerburg and the fishbelly girder bridge near Fehl-Ritzhausen as well as the stone arch bridge specially constructed for mining operations at the Alexandria colliery, the route had some special structural features.

The first section of the line included several bridges. In Herborn, the railway bridge crossed the Niederwalgern–Herborn / Siegen–Gießen lines, and in Burg, it crossed the Dill river, while near Amdorf, it crossed the Erdbach stream. In Schönbach, the line crossed a larger railway bridge built of natural stone. Several of its piers still remain today. The northern section of the line then led through the Wachtköppel Tunnel.

Other preserved structures include the Nister bridge near Fehl-Ritzhausen. A unique feature is the stone arch bridge at the former Alexandria colliery near Höhn, which was built specifically for mining operations.

Former railway bridge over the Dill Railway in Herborn

Former railway bridge over the Dill in Burg

Former railway bridge over the Erdbach near Amdorf (Herborn)

North portal of the Erdbacher Tunnel

Pillars of the former railway bridge in Schönbach (Herborn)

South portal of the Wachtköppel Tunnel

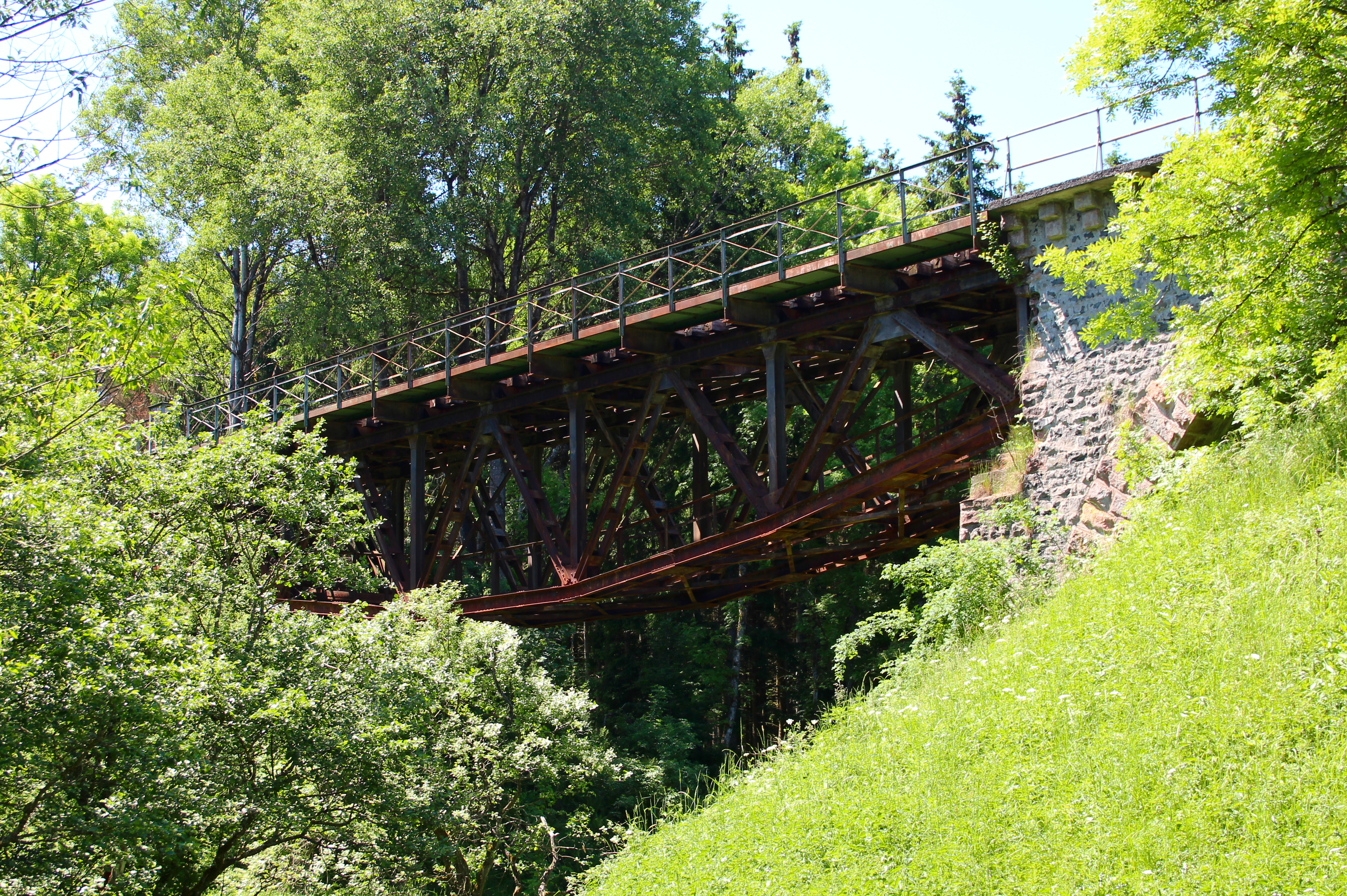
Nister Bridge near Fehl-Ritzhausen (2021)

Stone arch bridge at the former Alexandria colliery near Höhn (2026)

== IG Westerwald Querbahn e. V. ==
In 2002, the interest group IG Westerwald-Querbahn e. V. (IWQ) especially having the goal of the conservation and the reactivation of passenger- and fright transport on the Herborn–Montabaur railway, has been founded, which is located in Hellenhahn-Schellenberg.

== Sources ==
- Fuchs, Konrad (1961). "Die Erschließung des Westerwaldes durch die Eisenbahn". Nassauische Annalen (in German). 72: 143–159.
- Kandler, Udo (1992). "Eisenbahnen im Westerwald". Eisenbahn-Journal (in German) (Sonderausgabe I/92). Fürstenfeldbruck: Hermann Merker Verlag. ISSN 0720-051X.
- Kandler, Udo (2006). Hoch über den Westerwald. Streckenjubiläum 100 Jahre Westerwaldquerbahn (in German). Vol. 5. Eisenbahn-Journal. pp. 26–33.
- Merzhäuser, Willi; Wenzel, Hans-Jürgen (1996). Eisenbahnen im Westerwald – Zwischen Sieg und Lahn (in German). Freiburg: EK-Verlag. ISBN 3-88255-579-3.
- Schoth, Ulrich; Reeh, Michael; Zimmermann, Manuel (2007). 100 Jahre Eisenbahnstrecke Westerburg–Rennerod 1907–2007 (in German). Hellenhahn.
