= Rennerod station =

Railway station in Germany

Rennerod
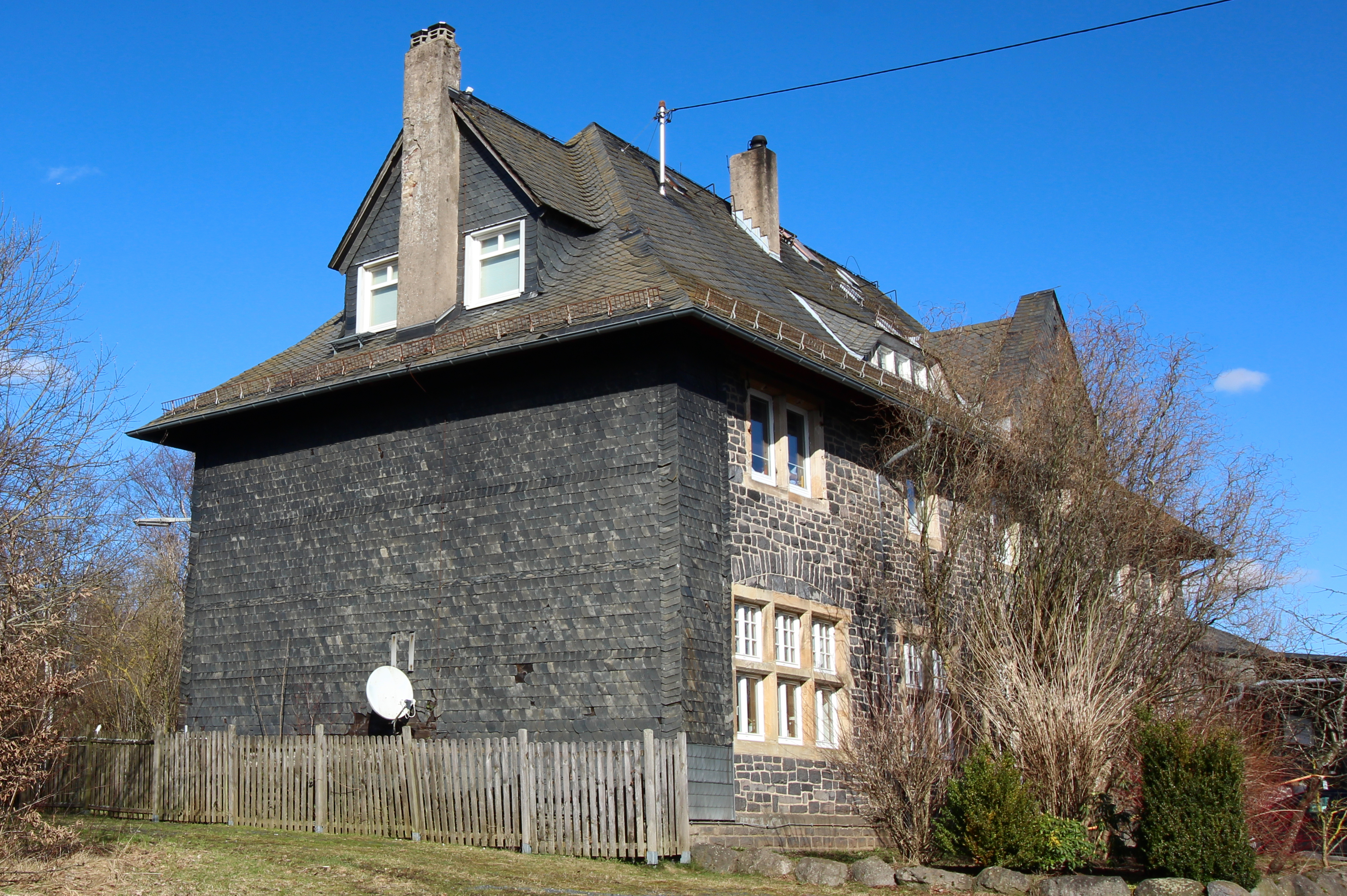
- Rennerod station building, street view

General information
- Location: Bahnhofstr. 60, 56477 Rennerod, Rhineland-Palatinate; Germany
- Coordinates: 50°37′7″N 8°4′18″E
- Elevation: 516 m (1,693 ft)
- Line: Herborn–Montabaur railway (km 31.4)
- Platforms: 2

Other information
- Station code: n/a
- DS100 code: FRED

History
- Opened: 1 October 1906
- Closed: 25 April 1998
Location

Rennerod station is a former station of the in Rennerod in Westerwaldkreis in the German state of Rhineland-Palatinate. It was located on the Herborn–Montabaur railway, also known as Westerwaldquerbahn ("cross Westerwald railway"), a former line from Herborn via Rennerod, Fehl-Ritzhausen, Westerburg and Wallmerod to Montabaur.

== History ==
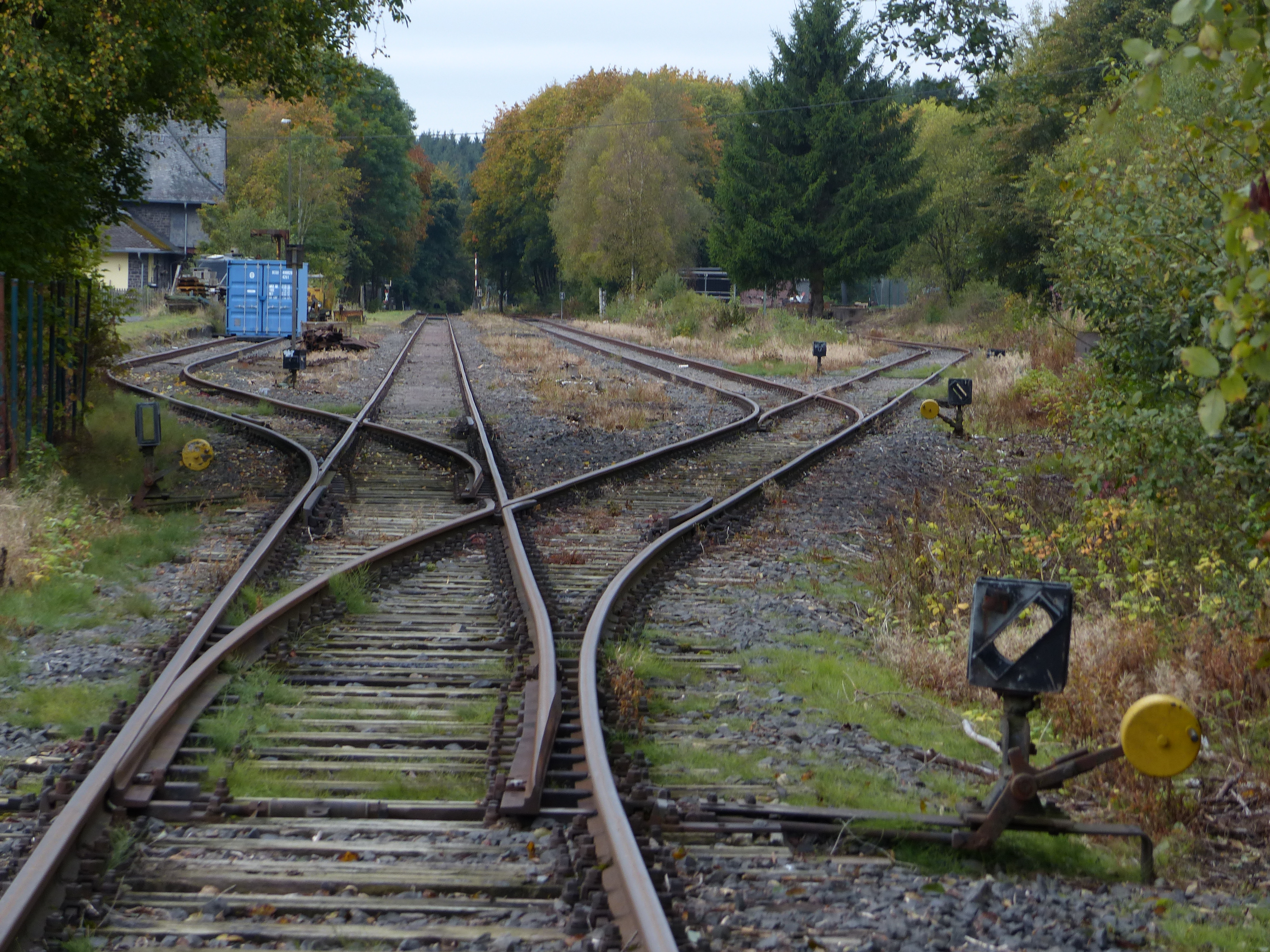
Tracks in Renenrod station

Service on the Herborn–Driedorf section began on 1 May 1906. The extension to Rennerod was delayed by several months because both the access road to the station and the water supply were not completed in time. Thus, the Driedorf–Rennerod section, along with Rennerod station, could not be opened until 1 October 1906. Originally, the station was located about 1 km (0.62 mi) north of the nearest settlement. The missing section to Westerburg was opened on 16 July 1907.

On the side of the station building with the attached goods shed, there was a long loading road. The station building was constructed in the local style using basalt stone. The goods shed was a timber-framed building with brick infill. An almost identical building was erected on the Fehl-Ritzhausen–Erbach railway at Marienberg station; a mirrored version was built at Fehl-Ritzhausen station. The weather side of the station building was subsequently clad in slate. On the opposite side of the station were a loading ramp and the engine shed. The track layout consisted of five tracks connected at both ends, two of which had platforms, as well as several stub tracks. In 1911, a mechanical signal box was installed in the station building.

Although some trains terminated in Rennerod, passenger traffic was never of great importance. Most recently, freight traffic was primarily focused on the Alsberg Barracks, located not far from the station. Passenger service towards Herborn was discontinued in 1959, and freight service in that direction in 1967. Subsequently, Rennerod was once again a terminus until its closure. The remaining passenger service to Westerburg ended in 1981. Although a freight forwarding company northeast of the station wanted to invest approximately DM 2.5 million in a new rail siding, this project was blocked by Deutsche Bahn in 1994. No freight traffic took place from 1995 onwards, and in 1998 the line, and consequently the station, was closed.

The station building is a listed building and is now privately owned. Several tracks are also still preserved; since 2014 these have been used by the IG Westerwald-Querbahn e. V., which offers railbike rides from here to Fehl-Ritzhausen.

== Sources ==
- Merzhäuser, Willi; Wenzel, Hans-Jürgen (1996). Eisenbahnen im Westerwald – Zwischen Sieg und Lahn (in German). Freiburg: EK-Verlag. ISBN 978-3-88255-579-0.
