= Siershahn =

- Municipality
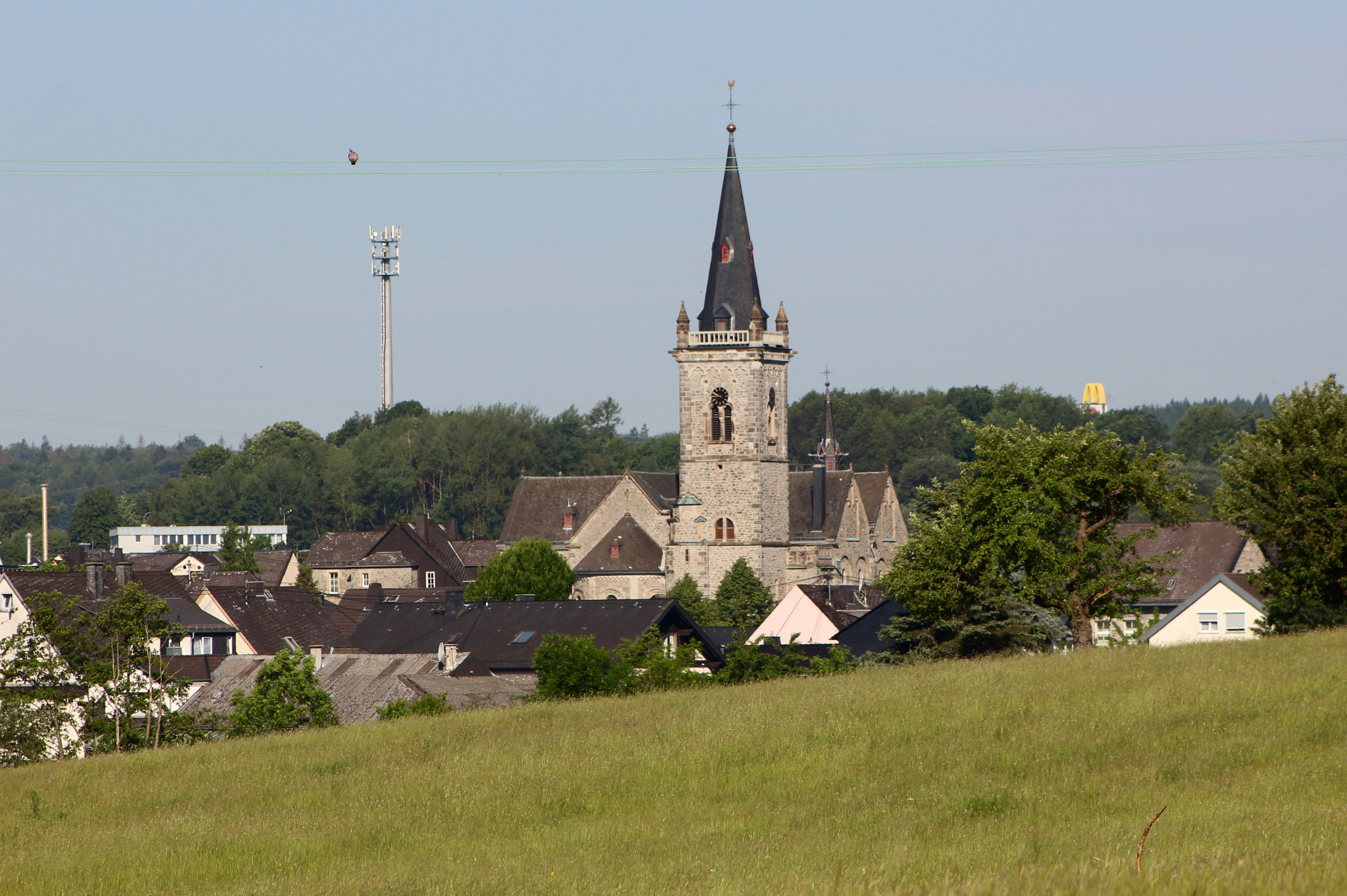

- Coat of arms

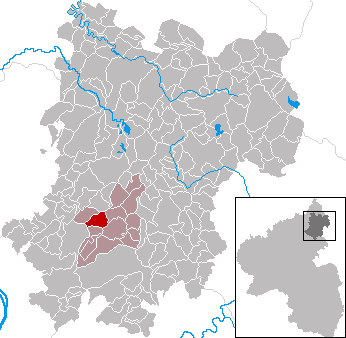
- Location of Siershahn within Westerwaldkreis district
- Interactive map of Siershahn
- Location within Germany Location within Rhineland-Palatinate
- Coordinates: 50°29′11″N 7°46′47″E
- Country: Germany
- State: Rhineland-Palatinate
- District: Westerwaldkreis
- Municipal assoc.: Wirges

Government
  - Mayor (2019–24): Alwin Scherz

Area
  - Total: 4.43 km^{2} (1.71 sq mi)
- Elevation: 290 m (950 ft)

Population (2025-12-31)
  - Total: 2,965
  - Density: 669/km^{2} (1,730/sq mi)
- Time zone: UTC+01:00 (CET)
  - Summer (DST): UTC+02:00 (CEST)
- Postal codes: 56427
- Dialling codes: 02623
- Vehicle registration: WW
- Website: www.siershahn.de

Siershahn is an Ortsgemeinde – a community belonging to a Verbandsgemeinde – in the Westerwaldkreis in Rhineland-Palatinate, Germany.

== History ==
Clay finds from La Tène times have been unearthed here. In 1211, Siershahn had its first documentary mention as Sigarshagen.

== Politics ==
The municipal council is made up of 21 council members, with the extraofficial mayor (Bürgermeister), who were elected in a municipal election on 9 June 2024.

Allocation of seats in the municipal council:

Election	CDU	FWG	BLS	Total
2024	11	9	–	20 seats
2019	11	9	–	20 seats
2014	11	7	2	20 seats
2009	9	8	3	20 seats
2004	8	8	4	20 seats

== Economy and infrastructure ==
Siershahn's biggest firm, and the one richest in tradition is Cera Tech (formerly Keramchemie), still employing most of the villagers. Nearby, during the Second World War, was a prison camp.

Siershahn has several bypass roads so that heavy vehicles do not drive through the community as they once did.

=== Transport ===
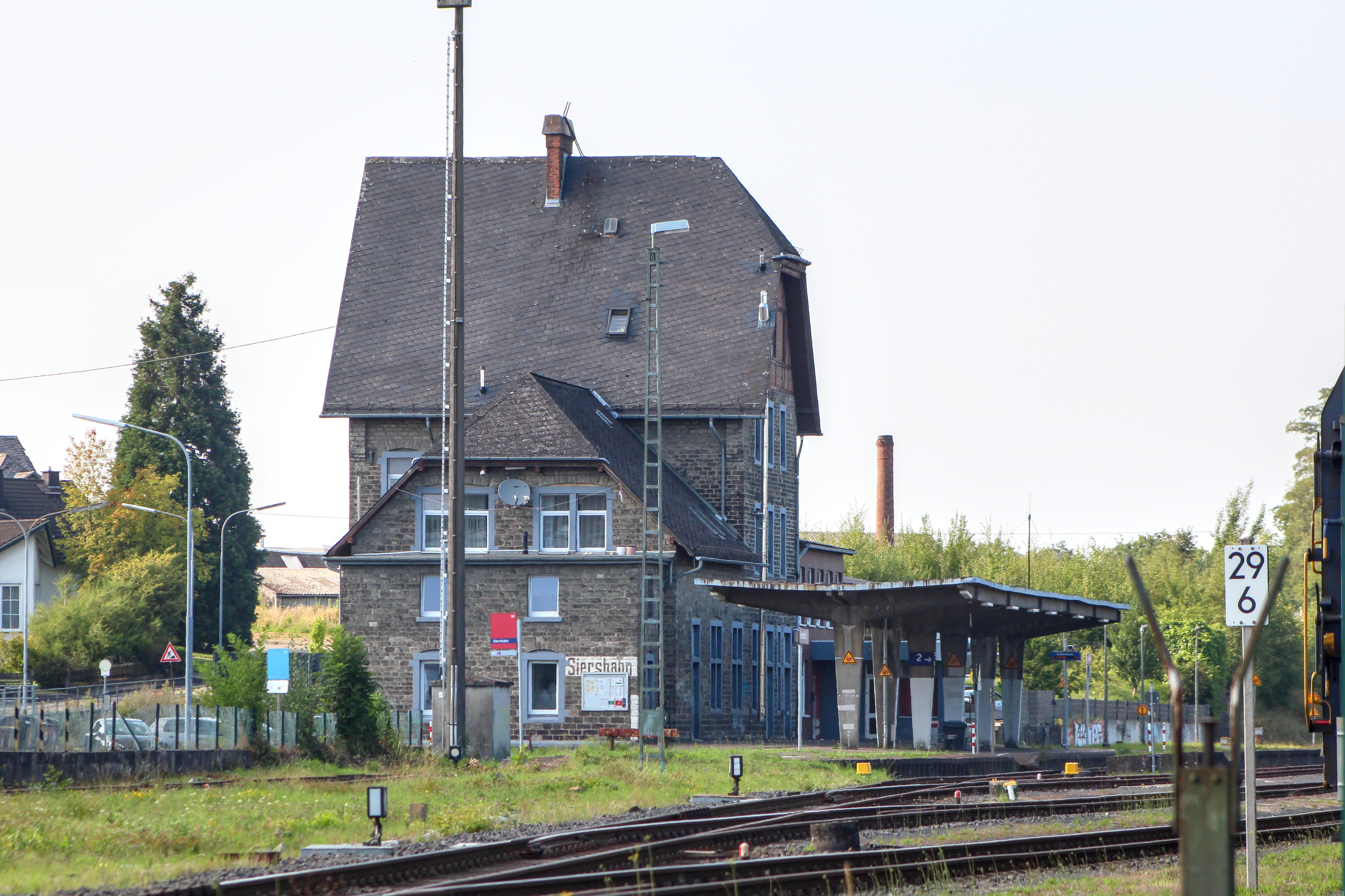
Siershahn station

.

Siershahn is located in the area of the transport association Verkehrsverbund Rhein-Mosel (VRM), zone number 420 and connected to the local bus and local train network. The nearest Autobahn interchange is Mogendorf on the A 3 (Cologne–Frankfurt), some 2 km away. Siershahn station was once an important railway hub between Limburg, Gießen and Cologne. All passenger services were closed over the years, except for the RB29 to Limburg (Lower-Weaterwald-railway), operated by DreiLänderBahn, a section of Hessische Landesbahn (HLB). The line to Au is used for freight and it is sometimes used for tourist services. The nearest InterCityExpress stop is Montabaur station on the Cologne-Frankfurt high-speed rail line.
