= Wirges =

- Town
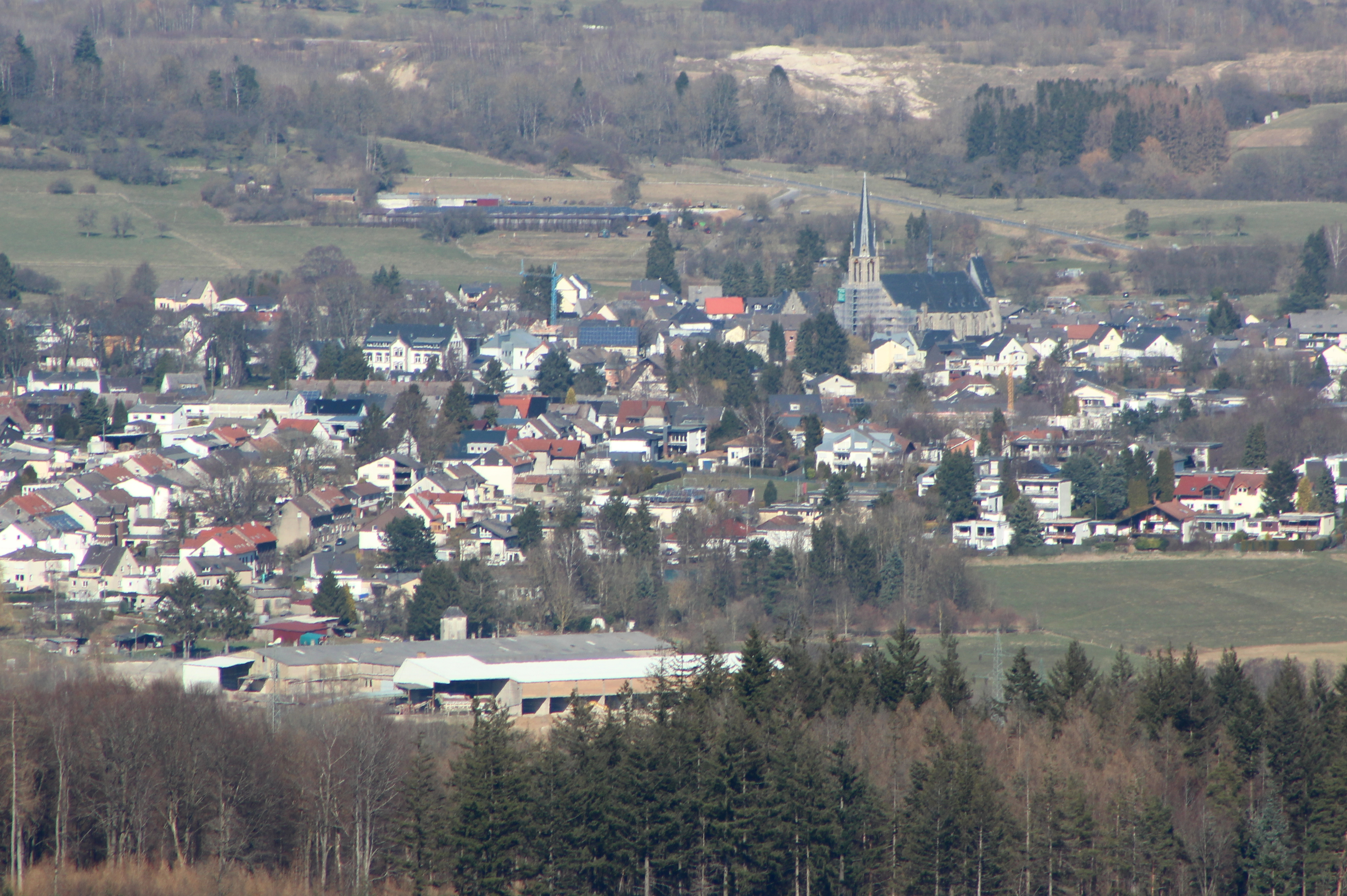

- Coat of arms

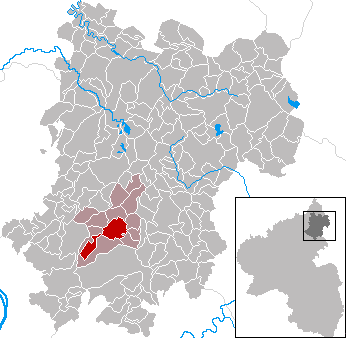
- Location of Wirges within Westerwaldkreis district
- Interactive map of Wirges
- Location within Germany Location within Rhineland-Palatinate
- Coordinates: 50°28′27″N 7°47′43″E
- Country: Germany
- State: Rhineland-Palatinate
- District: Westerwaldkreis
- Municipal assoc.: Wirges

Government
  - Mayor (2019–24): Andreas Weidenfeller (CDU)

Area
  - Total: 10.11 km^{2} (3.90 sq mi)
- Elevation: 267 m (876 ft)

Population (2025-12-31)
  - Total: 5,735
  - Density: 567.3/km^{2} (1,469/sq mi)
- Time zone: UTC+01:00 (CET)
  - Summer (DST): UTC+02:00 (CEST)
- Postal codes: 56422
- Dialling codes: 02602
- Vehicle registration: WW
- Website: www.wirges.eu

Wirges (German pronunciation: [ˈvɪʁɡəs]) is a town in the Westerwaldkreis in Rhineland-Palatinate, Germany.

== Geography ==
Wirges lies in a high hollow in the further Westerwald between Köppel and Malberg, roughly 5 km northwest of Montabaur and 20 km northeast of Koblenz. It was granted town rights in 1975. Wirges is the seat of the Verbandsgemeinde of Wirges, a kind of collective municipality. The people of Wirges call themselves Wirgeser.

== Politics ==
=== Town council ===
The council is made up of 22 council members, as well as the honorary and presiding mayor (Stadtbürgermeister), who were elected in a municipal election on 7 June 2009.

Allocation of seats in the municipal council:

	CDU	SPD	FDP	FW	Total
2009	12	8	2	–	22 seats
2004	12	9	–	1	22 seats

=== Coat of arms ===
The escutcheon has the shape of a late Gothic round shield with horizontal upper edge and sides meeting it at right angles. The town’s arms are those once borne in days of yore by the Widergis noble family, whose seat was in Wirges.

=== Town partnerships ===
Wirges has partnership arrangements with these places:

- Montchanin, Saône-et-Loire, France
- Samobor, Zagreb County, Croatia

== Economy and infrastructure ==
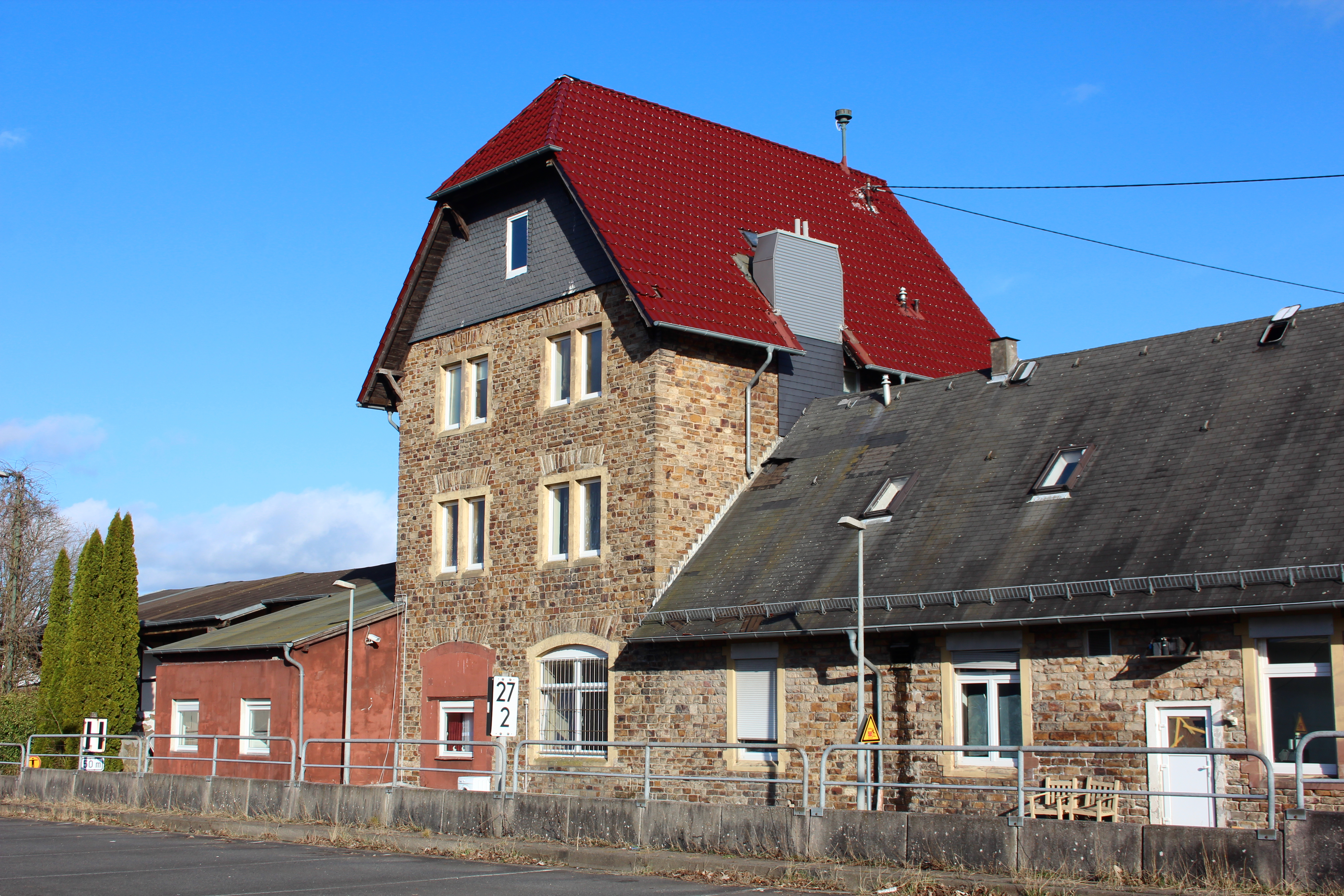
Train stop Wirges

The local bus lines 420, 425, 485, 958 and 963 connect Wirges to the public bus transport.

East of the town runs Bundesstraße 255 linking Montabaur and Rennerod. The nearest Autobahn interchange is Montabaur on the A 3 (Cologne–Frankfurt), some 3 km away.

The nearest InterCityExpress stop is at Montabaur station on the Cologne-Frankfurt high-speed rail line. The town lies on the Lower Westerwald Railway (Unterwesterwaldbahn) from Limburg to Siershahn, operated by DreiLänderBahn, a section of Hessische Landesbahn (HLB).

Wirges is located in the area of the transport association Verkehrsverbund Rhein-Mosel (VRM), zone number 414.

The Zweckverband SPNV Nord plans a new local train line from Neuwied via Ransbach-Baumbach and Siershahn and Wirges to Montabaur running on the Brexbach Valley Railway as well as the Lower Westerwald Railway.

== Sport and culture ==
SpVgg EGC Wirges’ first team plays in the football Oberliga Südwest; the A-youth have reached the Regionalliga Süd. The men’s second team play in the Rheinlandliga.

The main church is the Westerwälder Dom St. Bonifatius

Furthermore, Wirges has several choirs, a band and a music club.

== Notable people ==
- 1926: Kurt Isselbacher, physician
- 1951: Gerd Andres, politician
