= Nauort =

- Municipality
- Coat of arms

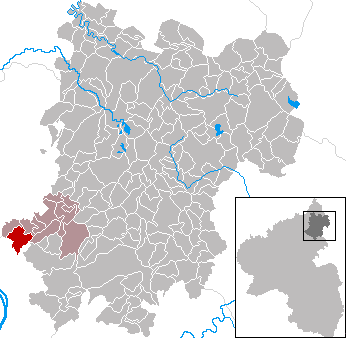
- Location of Nauort within Westerwaldkreis district
- Interactive map of Nauort
- Location within Germany Location within Rhineland-Palatinate
- Coordinates: 50°28′0″N 7°37′31″E
- Country: Germany
- State: Rhineland-Palatinate
- District: Westerwaldkreis
- Municipal assoc.: Ransbach-Baumbach

Government
  - Mayor (2019–24): Dietmar Quernes (CDU)

Area
  - Total: 6.42 km^{2} (2.48 sq mi)
- Elevation: 300 m (980 ft)

Population (2025-12-31)
  - Total: 2,339
  - Density: 364/km^{2} (944/sq mi)
- Time zone: UTC+01:00 (CET)
  - Summer (DST): UTC+02:00 (CEST)
- Postal codes: 56237
- Dialling codes: 02601
- Vehicle registration: WW
- Website: www.nauort.de

Nauort is an Ortsgemeinde – a community belonging to a Verbandsgemeinde – in the Westerwaldkreis in Rhineland-Palatinate, Germany.

== Geography ==
=== Location ===
The community lies in the Westerwald between Koblenz and Siegen. A local tourist draw is the community's favourable location in the Sayn-Isenburg-Grenzau “castle triangle”. Nauort belongs to the Verbandsgemeinde of Ransbach-Baumbach, a kind of collective municipality. Its seat is in the like-named town.

=== Neighbouring communities ===
Nauort's immediate neighbours are the smaller Ortsgemeinden Caan (1 km away), Sessenbach (2 km) and Alsbach (2 km) as well as Bendorf’s outlying centre of Stromberg (2 km).

== History ==
The name “Nauort” developed by way of “Naurodt” (16th century) from “Nuenrohde”, meaning “new clearing”, which had its first documentary mention in 1279.

In the 20th century, besides agriculture, the local pumice industry was one of the main income sources for Nauorters. Benefits were also drawn from the community's membership in the Kannenbäckerland ("Jug Bakers’ Land") around the ceramics production centre of Höhr-Grenzhausen.

=== Religion ===
The Catholic parish, which belongs to the Bishopric of Limburg, has as its church patron John the Baptist.

== Politics ==
=== Community council ===
The council is made up of 17 council members, including the extraofficial mayor (Bürgermeister), who were elected in a majority vote in a municipal election on 25 May 2014.

	CDU	FWG	Total
2014	10	6	16 seats

=== Coat of arms ===
The community's arms are based on the following points: The community of Nauort, mentioned in a document in 1279, lies in the former Engersgau and belonged to the lordly domain of Isenburg-Grenzau. Once the Lower Isenburg line died out, the community passed to the Electorate of Trier in 1664, and then in 1803 to Nassau-Weilburg. From 1806 it belonged to the Duchy of Nassau. In 1866 it passed to Prussia and became part of the province of Hesse-Nassau. Nauort lies in the landscape within the Sayn-Isenburg-Grenzau triangle between the charming valleys of the Saynbach and Brexbach on a wooded high plateau. The broad bend sinister wavy seen in the arms stands with the two blue fields of the same size, each with two silver wavy bendlets, for the two valleys with the Saynbach and Brexbach. Widespread pumice deposits from volcanic time gave rise to a pumice industry, which for a long time was an income earner for the community's inhabitants. The pumice, with its naturally yellow colour is represented in the arms by the gold (yellow) colour of the middle field inside the broad bend, also of the same size. Besides the customary agriculture, the jug firer's trade was an income earner and livelihood for Nauorters well into the 19th century. The craft is documented in the civic arms by the typical jug with its blue tincture. Finally, the field tinctures blue and gold recall Nassau's armorial tinctures, Nauort having belonged to this territory for a long time, as earlier mentioned. Today, Nauort is a community with a good location for living and economic development in the Verbandsgemeinde of Ransbach-Baumbach in the Westerwaldkreis.

Nauort's coat of arms is thereby based in its history, crafts and landscape.

=== Town partnerships ===
Nauort maintains partnerships with the following places:

- Condette, Pas-de-Calais, France
- Oundle, Northamptonshire, England, United Kingdom

== Economy and infrastructure ==
West of the community runs Bundesstraße 413, leading from Koblenz to Hachenburg. The A 48 with the Höhr-Grenzhausen interchange lies 6 km away. The nearest InterCityExpress stop is the railway station at Montabaur on the Cologne-Frankfurt high-speed rail line.
