= Hundsdorf =

- Municipality
- Coat of arms

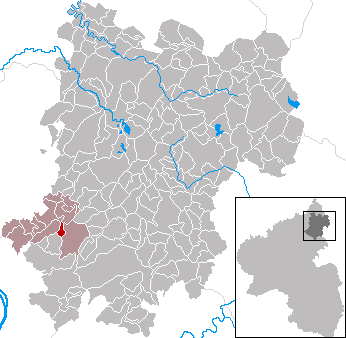
- Location of Hundsdorf within Westerwaldkreis district
- Interactive map of Hundsdorf
- Location within Germany Location within Rhineland-Palatinate
- Coordinates: 50°28′20″N 7°42′14″E
- Country: Germany
- State: Rhineland-Palatinate
- District: Westerwaldkreis
- Municipal assoc.: Ransbach-Baumbach

Government
  - Mayor (2019–24): Eckhard Niebisch

Area
  - Total: 1.40 km^{2} (0.54 sq mi)
- Elevation: 290 m (950 ft)

Population (2025-12-31)
  - Total: 445
  - Density: 318/km^{2} (823/sq mi)
- Time zone: UTC+01:00 (CET)
  - Summer (DST): UTC+02:00 (CEST)
- Postal codes: 56235
- Dialling codes: 02623
- Vehicle registration: WW
- Website: www.hundsdorf.de

Hundsdorf (German pronunciation: [ˈhʊntsˌdɔʁf]) is an Ortsgemeinde – a community belonging to a Verbandsgemeinde – in the Westerwaldkreis in Rhineland-Palatinate, Germany.

== Geography ==
The community lies in the Westerwald between Koblenz and Siegen on the edge of the Kannenbäckerland, a region known for its ceramics industry. Hundsdorf belongs to the Verbandsgemeinde of Ransbach-Baumbach, a kind of collective municipality.

== History ==
In 1243, Hundsdorf had its first documentary mention as Hunisdorp.

== Politics ==
The municipal council is made up of 8 council members who were elected in a majority vote in a municipal election on 13 June 2004.

== Regular events ==
Each year, between Ascension and Whitsun, a Western town is built here in which Western and Indian clubs recreate the atmosphere of the Wild West for a few days under authentic conditions.

In early August each year, Hundsdorf holds its kermis.

== Economy and infrastructure ==
The local bus lines 421, 461 and 467 connect Hundsdorf to the public transport, the village is located in the area of the transport association Verkehrsverbund Rhein-Mosel (VRM). The A 48 with its Höhr-Grenzhausen interchange (AS 12) lies 6 km away. The A 3 (Cologne–Frankfurt) with its Ransbach-Baumbach interchange lies only 5 km away. Hundsdorf used to have a stop at the Engers-Au railway which currently is out of service. The nearest InterCityExpress stop is the railway station at Montabaur on the Cologne-Frankfurt high-speed rail line.
