= Wirscheid =

- Municipality
- Coat of arms

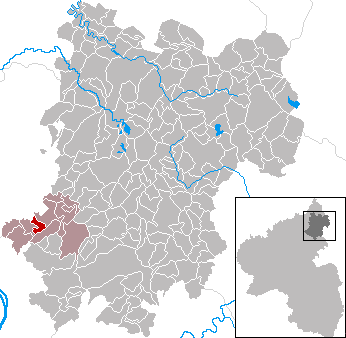
- Location of Wirscheid within Westerwaldkreis district
- Interactive map of Wirscheid
- Location within Germany Location within Rhineland-Palatinate
- Coordinates: 50°28′41″N 7°40′2″E
- Country: Germany
- State: Rhineland-Palatinate
- District: Westerwaldkreis
- Municipal assoc.: Ransbach-Baumbach

Government
  - Mayor (2019–24): Christine Klasen

Area
  - Total: 2.68 km^{2} (1.03 sq mi)
- Elevation: 293 m (961 ft)

Population (2025-12-31)
  - Total: 348
  - Density: 130/km^{2} (336/sq mi)
- Time zone: UTC+01:00 (CET)
  - Summer (DST): UTC+02:00 (CEST)
- Postal codes: 56237
- Dialling codes: 02601
- Vehicle registration: WW
- Website: www.wirscheid.de

Wirscheid is an Ortsgemeinde – a community belonging to a Verbandsgemeinde – in the Westerwaldkreis in Rhineland-Palatinate, Germany.

== Geography ==
The community lies in the Westerwald between Koblenz and Altenkirchen in the Kannenbäckerland (“Jug Bakers’ Land”, a small region known for its ceramics industry). Wirscheid belongs to the Verbandsgemeinde of Ransbach-Baumbach, a kind of collective municipality. Its seat is in the like-named town.

== History ==
In 1547, Wirscheid had its first mention in a historical document as Wersched.

== Politics ==
The municipal council is made up of 11 council members, including the extraofficial mayor (Bürgermeister), who were elected in a municipal election on 13 June 2004.

	Grüne	WG Wirz	Total
2004	2	8	10 seats

== Economy and infrastructure ==
Autobahn A 48 with its Höhr-Grenzhausen interchange (AS 12) lies 6 km away. The nearest InterCityExpress stop is the railway station at Montabaur on the Cologne-Frankfurt high-speed rail line.
