= Oberhaid, Rhineland-Palatinate =

Oberhaid
- Municipality
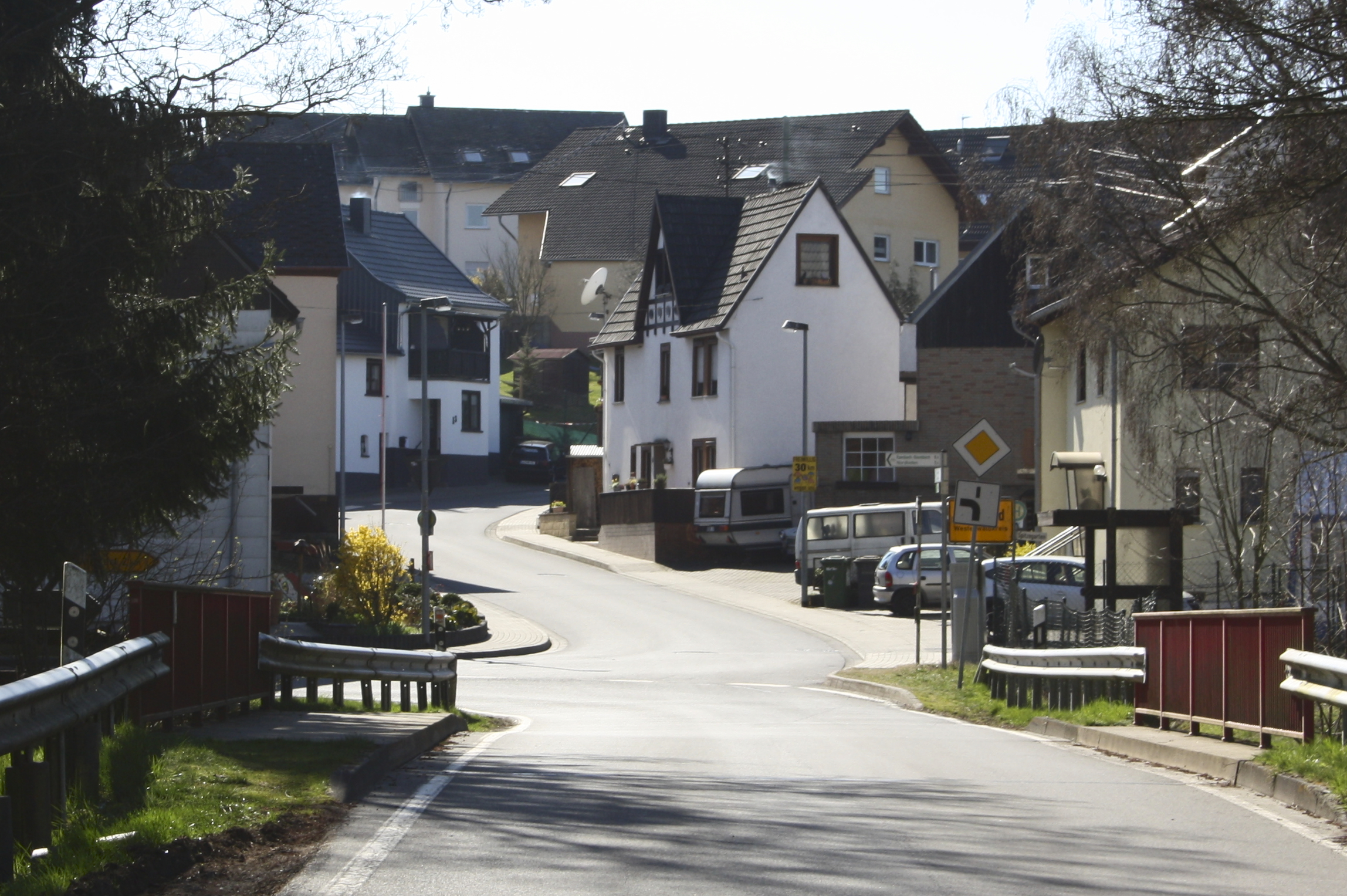

- Coat of arms

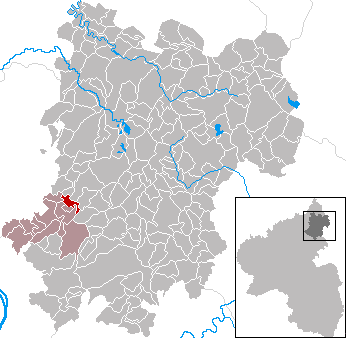
- Location of Oberhaid within Westerwaldkreis district
- Interactive map of Oberhaid
- Location within Germany Location within Rhineland-Palatinate
- Coordinates: 50°30′36″N 7°43′6″E
- Country: Germany
- State: Rhineland-Palatinate
- District: Westerwaldkreis
- Municipal assoc.: Ransbach-Baumbach

Government
  - Mayor (2019–24): Horst Albrecht Weggel

Area
  - Total: 1.92 km^{2} (0.74 sq mi)
- Elevation: 242 m (794 ft)

Population (2025-12-31)
  - Total: 387
  - Density: 202/km^{2} (522/sq mi)
- Time zone: UTC+01:00 (CET)
  - Summer (DST): UTC+02:00 (CEST)
- Postal codes: 56237
- Dialling codes: 02626
- Vehicle registration: WW
- Website: www.oberhaid-ww.de

Oberhaid (German pronunciation: [ˈoːbɐhaɪt]) is an Ortsgemeinde – a community belonging to a Verbandsgemeinde – in the Westerwaldkreis in Rhineland-Palatinate, Germany.

== Geography ==
The community lies in the Westerwald between Koblenz and Siegen on the edge of the Kannenbäckerland. Through the community flows the Sayn, which belongs to the Rhine drainage basin. Oberhaid belongs to the Verbandsgemeinde of Ransbach-Baumbach, a kind of collective municipality. Its seat is in the like-named town.

== History ==
In 1376, Oberhaid had its first documentary mention as Heide.

== Politics ==
The municipal council is made up of 8 council members who were elected in a majority vote in a municipal election on 13 June 2004.

=== Federal elections ===
Results of the 2025 German federal election in Oberhaid:

2025 German federal election
	percent
AfD	40.7%
CDU	15.6%
SPD	14.8%
FDP	11.1%
Greens	8.1%
BSW	4.4%
Die Linke	3.0%
Free Voters	2.2%
others	0.1%

== Economy and infrastructure ==
=== Transport ===
Bundesautobahn 3 and the Cologne-Frankfurt high-speed rail line run through Oberhaid's municipal area. The nearest Autobahn interchange is Ransbach-Baumbach (Nr. 38), some 6 km southeast of the middle of the community. The nearest station on the high-speed rail line is Montabaur; nearer still, however, is Siershahn station on the Unterwesterwaldbahn (railway).
