= Wittgert =

- Municipality
- Coat of arms

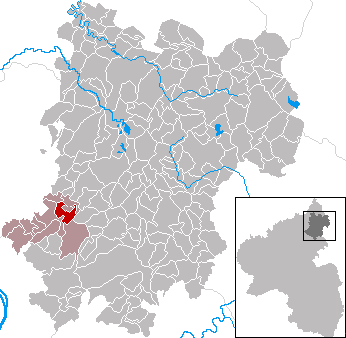
- Location of Wittgert within Westerwaldkreis district
- Interactive map of Wittgert
- Location within Germany Location within Rhineland-Palatinate
- Coordinates: 50°29′50″N 7°41′51″E
- Country: Germany
- State: Rhineland-Palatinate
- District: Westerwaldkreis
- Municipal assoc.: Ransbach-Baumbach

Government
  - Mayor (2019–24): Thomas Hoffmann

Area
  - Total: 4.74 km^{2} (1.83 sq mi)
- Elevation: 235 m (771 ft)

Population (2025-12-31)
  - Total: 633
  - Density: 134/km^{2} (346/sq mi)
- Time zone: UTC+01:00 (CET)
  - Summer (DST): UTC+02:00 (CEST)
- Postal codes: 56237
- Dialling codes: 02623
- Vehicle registration: WW
- Website: www.wittgert.de

Wittgert is an Ortsgemeinde – a community belonging to a Verbandsgemeinde – in the Westerwaldkreis in Rhineland-Palatinate, Germany.

== Geography ==
The community lies in the Westerwald between Koblenz and Siegen on the borders of the Kannenbäckerland (“Jug Bakers’ Land”, a small region known for its ceramics industry). The Saynbach, which belongs to the Rhine drainage basin, flows past the community. Through the community itself flows the Röttgesbach, which empties into the Saynbach. Wittgert belongs to the Verbandsgemeinde of Ransbach-Baumbach, a kind of collective municipality. Its seat is in the town of the same name.

== History ==
In 1298, Wittgert was first mentioned in a document as Widechinrode.

== Politics ==
The municipal council is made up of 12 council members who were elected in a majority vote in a municipal election on 13 June 2004.

== Economy and infrastructure ==
Autobahn A 3 (Cologne–Frankfurt) with its Mogendorf interchange (AS 38) lies 6 km away. The nearest InterCityExpress stop is the railway station at Montabaur on the Cologne-Frankfurt high-speed rail line.
