= Westerwald pottery =

Type of stoneware manufactured in Westerwald, Germany

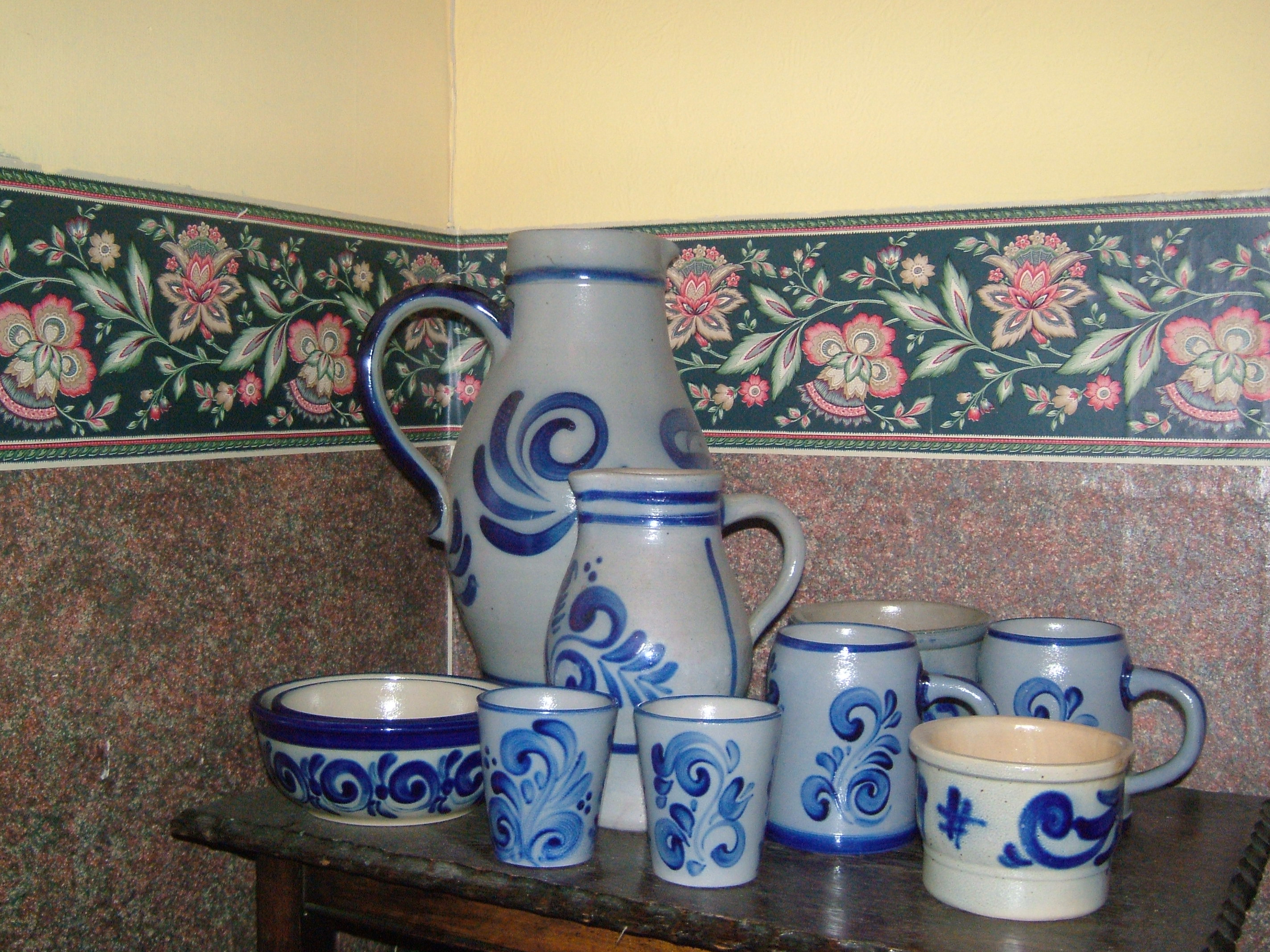
Domestic pottery

Westerwald pottery, or Westerwald stoneware, is a distinctive type of salt glazed grey pottery from the Höhr-Grenzhausen and Ransbach-Baumbach area of Westerwaldkreis in Rheinland-Pfalz, Germany. Typically, Westerwald pottery is decorated with cobalt blue painted designs, although some later examples are white. It may also be decorated with contrasting black or brown-purple designs. The salt glaze creates a glossy surface. It is also known as Kannenbäckerland stoneware.

== History ==
Westerwald pottery originated from potting families from Siegburg and Raeren, in present-day Belgium, who emigrated to the Westerwald area in the 1580s and 1590s. These immigrants included Anno Knütgen and his family, who traveled from Siegburg to Höhr, and the Mennicken family, who traveled from Raeren to Grenzhausen.

By the 17th century, Westerwald stoneware became widely distributed throughout the world. The stoneware was often sent to British markets, sometimes with a molded medallion containing a portrait of William III of England inside a border with the king's name. Others featured portraits of Louis XIV of France. Westerwald stoneware intended for the home market, rather than heraldry, often featured patterns of rosettes, lion's heads, cherubs, and stars.

The Keramikmuseum Westerwald in Höhr-Grenzhausen displays the construction techniques and the history of salt glaze.
