= Sessenbach =

- Municipality
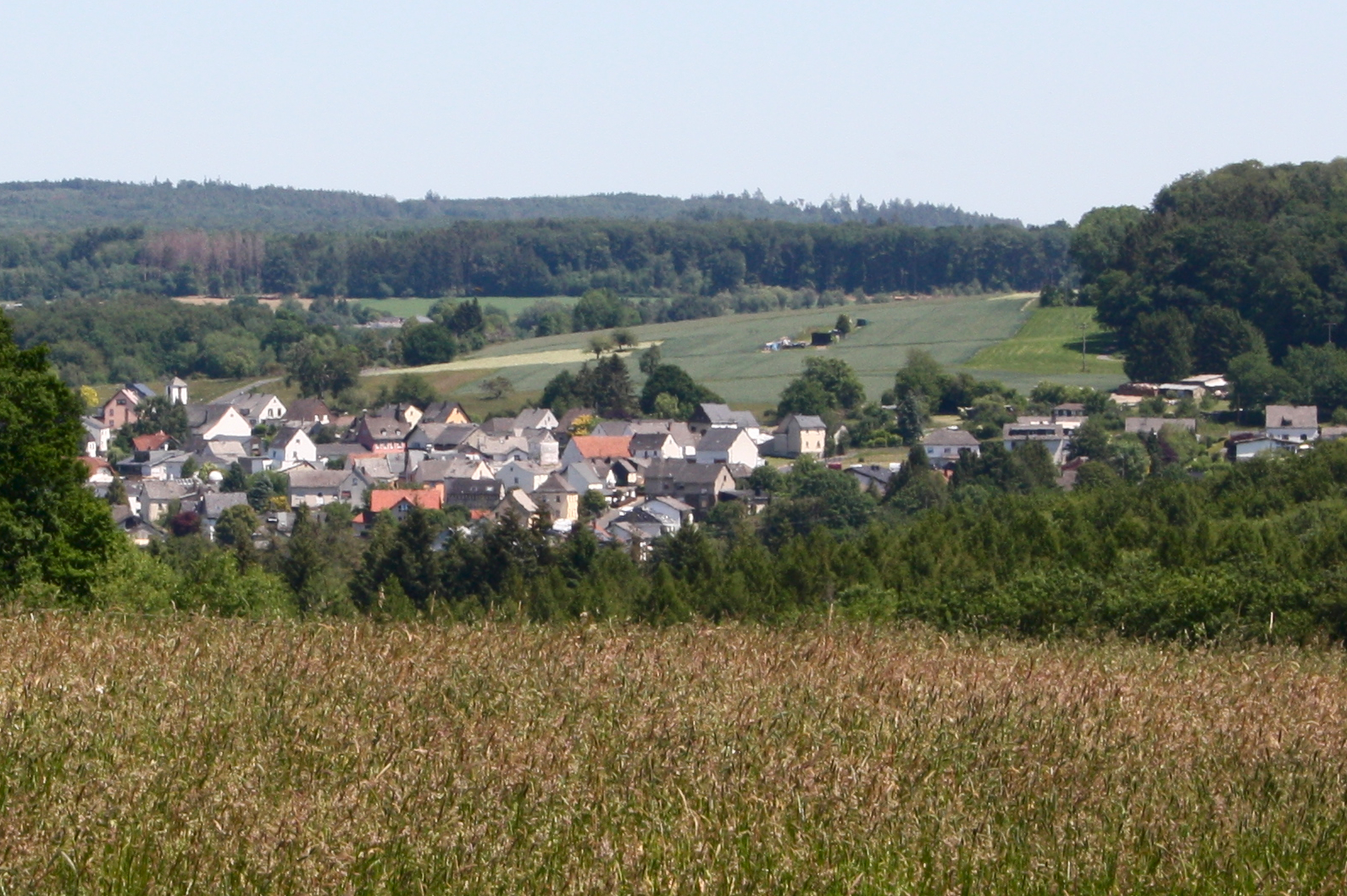

- Coat of arms

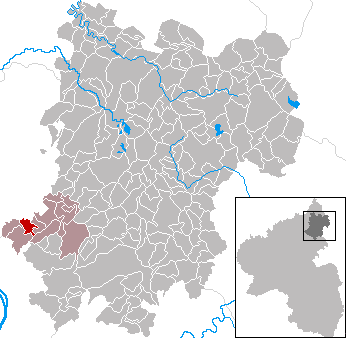
- Location of Sessenbach within Westerwaldkreis district
- Interactive map of Sessenbach
- Location within Germany Location within Rhineland-Palatinate
- Coordinates: 50°28′37″N 7°38′40″E
- Country: Germany
- State: Rhineland-Palatinate
- District: Westerwaldkreis
- Municipal assoc.: Ransbach-Baumbach

Government
  - Mayor (2021–26): Ina Anhäuser

Area
  - Total: 2.79 km^{2} (1.08 sq mi)
- Elevation: 285 m (935 ft)

Population (2025-12-31)
  - Total: 514
  - Density: 184/km^{2} (477/sq mi)
- Time zone: UTC+01:00 (CET)
  - Summer (DST): UTC+02:00 (CEST)
- Postal codes: 56237
- Dialling codes: 02601
- Vehicle registration: WW
- Website: www.sessenbach.de

Sessenbach is an Ortsgemeinde – a community belonging to a Verbandsgemeinde – in the Westerwaldkreis in Rhineland-Palatinate, Germany.

== Geography ==
The community lies in the Westerwald between Koblenz and Siegen in the Kannenbäckerland ("Jug Bakers’ Land", a small region known for its pottery industry). Through the community flows the Sessenbach, which belongs to the Rhine drainage basin. Sessenbach belongs to the Verbandsgemeinde of Ransbach-Baumbach, a kind of collective municipality. Its seat is in the like-named town.

== History ==
In 1321, the village had its first documentary mention as Sinsinbach. Archaeological finds have led to the conclusion that there was once a Celtic dwelling pit settlement here.

At first documentary mention in 1321, Luther von Isenburg held Sinsinbach in fief. The Isenburg estate and the Wollenschlägers Höfchen at Sessenbach were in Isenburg hands until 1664, whereafter they passed to the Electorate of Trier. The Saynhof (1331, Hof “Uf der Seijne”) found itself in many owner's hands, ending up in 1723 under the Oberwerth Monastery's ownership. Isenburg-Grenzau owned a share of the tithes from Sessenbach in 1600.

Today, Sessenbach has roughly 550 inhabitants living in 160 houses with all together 230 dwellings in an area of 2.8 km^{2}.

In the 20th century, the villagers’ main livelihoods were agriculture and ceramics. Sessenbach is still a village, and it has several clubs for local residents.

Since 1972 Sessenbach has belonged to the Verbandsgemeinde of Ransbach-Baumbach.

== Politics ==
The municipal council is made up of 12 council members who were elected in a majority vote in a municipal election on 13 June 2004.

== Economy and infrastructure ==
Autobahn A 48 with its Höhr-Grenzhausen (AS 12) interchange lies 6 km away. The nearest InterCityExpress stop is the railway station at Montabaur on the Cologne-Frankfurt high-speed rail line.
