= Breitenau, Germany =

Breitenau
- Municipality
- Coat of arms

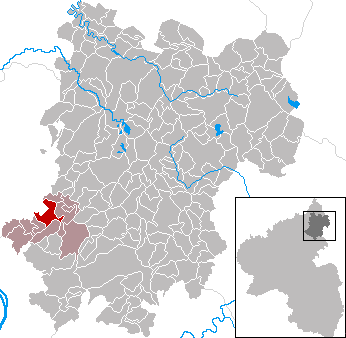
- Location of Breitenau within Westerwaldkreis district
- Interactive map of Breitenau
- Location within Germany Location within Rhineland-Palatinate
- Coordinates: 50°29′53″N 7°41′26″E
- Country: Germany
- State: Rhineland-Palatinate
- District: Westerwaldkreis
- Municipal assoc.: Ransbach-Baumbach

Government
  - Mayor (2019–24): Jürgen Berleth

Area
  - Total: 6.06 km^{2} (2.34 sq mi)
- Elevation: 205 m (673 ft)

Population (2025-12-31)
  - Total: 721
  - Density: 119/km^{2} (308/sq mi)
- Time zone: UTC+01:00 (CET)
  - Summer (DST): UTC+02:00 (CEST)
- Postal codes: 56237
- Dialling codes: 02623
- Vehicle registration: WW
- Website: www.breitenau.de

Breitenau is an Ortsgemeinde – a municipality belonging to a Verbandsgemeinde – in the Westerwaldkreis in Rhineland-Palatinate, Germany. Breitenau belongs to the Verbandsgemeinde of Ransbach-Baumbach, a kind of collective municipality.

== Geography ==
The municipality lies in the Westerwald between Koblenz and Siegen on the rim of the Rhein-Westerwald Nature Park (Naturpark Rhein-Westerwald).

== History ==
The village had its first mention in 1265 as Bredenowe. From 1343 until 1664 it belonged to the county of Isenburg, and then it passed to the Electorate of Trier. In 1802 it passed to the Duchy of Nassau, and eventually, in 1866, to Prussia.

== Politics ==
The municipal council is made up of 12 council members, including the honorary and presiding mayor (Ortsbürgermeister), who were elected in a majority vote in a municipal election on 7 June 2009.

== Music ==
The "St. Georgsbläser Haiderbach e.V." association was founded in 1973, featuring a wind orchestra of approximately 45 musicians. It has become an integral part of the local church and wider community. Through its training ensembles, preparatory and youth orchestras, recorder groups, and early childhood music education programs, the association also fosters musicality among the children and young people living in the Haiderbach area. In addition to performing within the Haiderbach communities, such as at the traditional local fair kermis, the St. Georgsbläser can always be heard at festivals, kermis parades and concerts. A particular highlight is the "Singende, klingende Haiderbach" ("Singing, Resounding Haiderbach") event held every two years at the Haiderbachhalle in collaboration with the Haiderbach choral society and the church choir.

== Economy and infrastructure ==
The A 3 with its Mogendorf interchange (AS 38) lies 6 km away. The nearest InterCityExpress stop is the railway station at Montabaur on the Cologne-Frankfurt high-speed rail line.

== Notable residents ==
George J. Rath, founder of the Rath Packing Company, a defunct American meat packing company that lasted from 1891 to 1985
