= Ransbach-Baumbach (Verbandsgemeinde) =

- Verbandsgemeinde
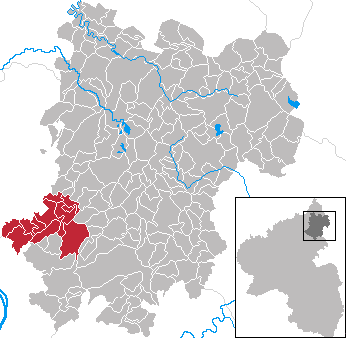
- Location of Ransbach-Baumbach within Westerwaldkreis district
- Interactive map of Ransbach-Baumbach
- Location within Germany Location within Rhineland-Palatinate
- Coordinates: 50°28′N 7°44′E
- Country: Germany
- State: Rhineland-Palatinate
- District: Westerwaldkreis
- Seat: Ransbach-Baumbach
- Subdivisions: 11 municipalities

Area
  - Total: 49.65 km^{2} (19.17 sq mi)

Population (2025-12-31)
  - Total: 15,641
  - Density: 315.0/km^{2} (815.9/sq mi)
- Time zone: UTC+01:00 (CET)
  - Summer (DST): UTC+02:00 (CEST)
- Website: www.ransbach-baumbach.de

Ransbach-Baumbach is a Verbandsgemeinde ("collective municipality") in the district Westerwaldkreis, in Rhineland-Palatinate, Germany. The seat of the Verbandsgemeinde is in Ransbach-Baumbach.

The Verbandsgemeinde Ransbach-Baumbach consists of the following Ortsgemeinden ("local municipalities"):

1. Alsbach
2. Breitenau
3. Caan
4. Deesen
5. Hundsdorf
6. Nauort
7. Oberhaid
8. Ransbach-Baumbach
9. Sessenbach
10. Wirscheid
11. Wittgert
