= Kammerforst, Rhineland-Palatinate =

Kammerforst
- Municipality
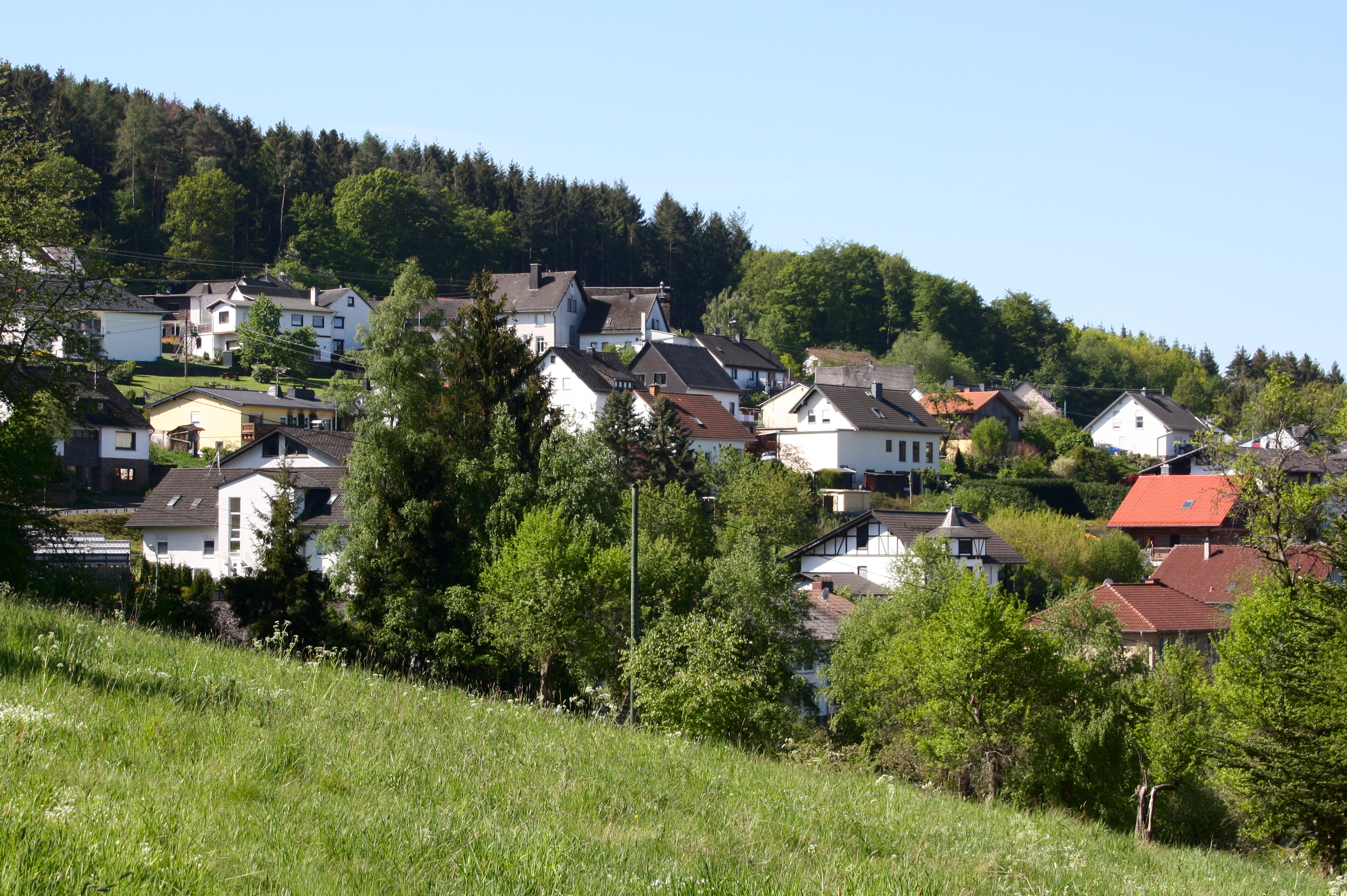

- Coat of arms

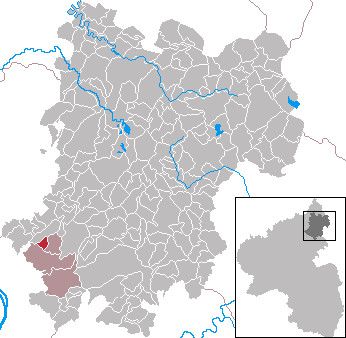
- Location of Kammerforst within Westerwaldkreis district
- Interactive map of Kammerforst
- Location within Germany Location within Rhineland-Palatinate
- Coordinates: 50°27′50″N 7°40′38″E
- Country: Germany
- State: Rhineland-Palatinate
- District: Westerwaldkreis
- Municipal assoc.: Höhr-Grenzhausen

Government
  - Mayor (2019–24): Kevin Michael Heibel

Area
  - Total: 1.33 km^{2} (0.51 sq mi)
- Elevation: 280 m (920 ft)

Population (2025-12-31)
  - Total: 257
  - Density: 193/km^{2} (500/sq mi)
- Time zone: UTC+01:00 (CET)
  - Summer (DST): UTC+02:00 (CEST)
- Postal codes: 56206
- Dialling codes: 02624
- Vehicle registration: WW
- Website: www.gemeinde-Kammerforst.de

Kammerforst (German pronunciation: [ˈkamɐˌfɔʁst]) in the Kannenbäckerland is an Ortsgemeinde – a community belonging to a Verbandsgemeinde – in the Westerwaldkreis in Rhineland-Palatinate, Germany.

== Geography ==
The community lies roughly 13 km northeast of Koblenz on the edge of the Nassau Nature Park. The community belongs to the Verbandsgemeinde of Höhr-Grenzhausen, a kind of collective municipality. Its seat is in the like-named town.

== History ==
The community came into being sometime about the year 1680. It was founded by Walloon guest workers who were seeking iron ore in the area.

== Politics ==
The municipal council is made up of 7 council members, including the extraofficial mayor (Bürgermeister), who were elected in a municipal election on 13 June 2004.

	Einzelbewerber	Total
2004	6	6 seats

== Economy and infrastructure ==
The A 48 with its Höhr-Grenzhausen interchange is 4 km away. The nearest InterCityExpress stop is the railway station at Montabaur on the Cologne-Frankfurt high-speed rail line or the one at on the Rechte Rheinstrecke. Kammerforst is located at the Engers–Au railway, although there currently is no train service.
