= Salt glaze pottery =

Pottery with ceramic glaze made of salt

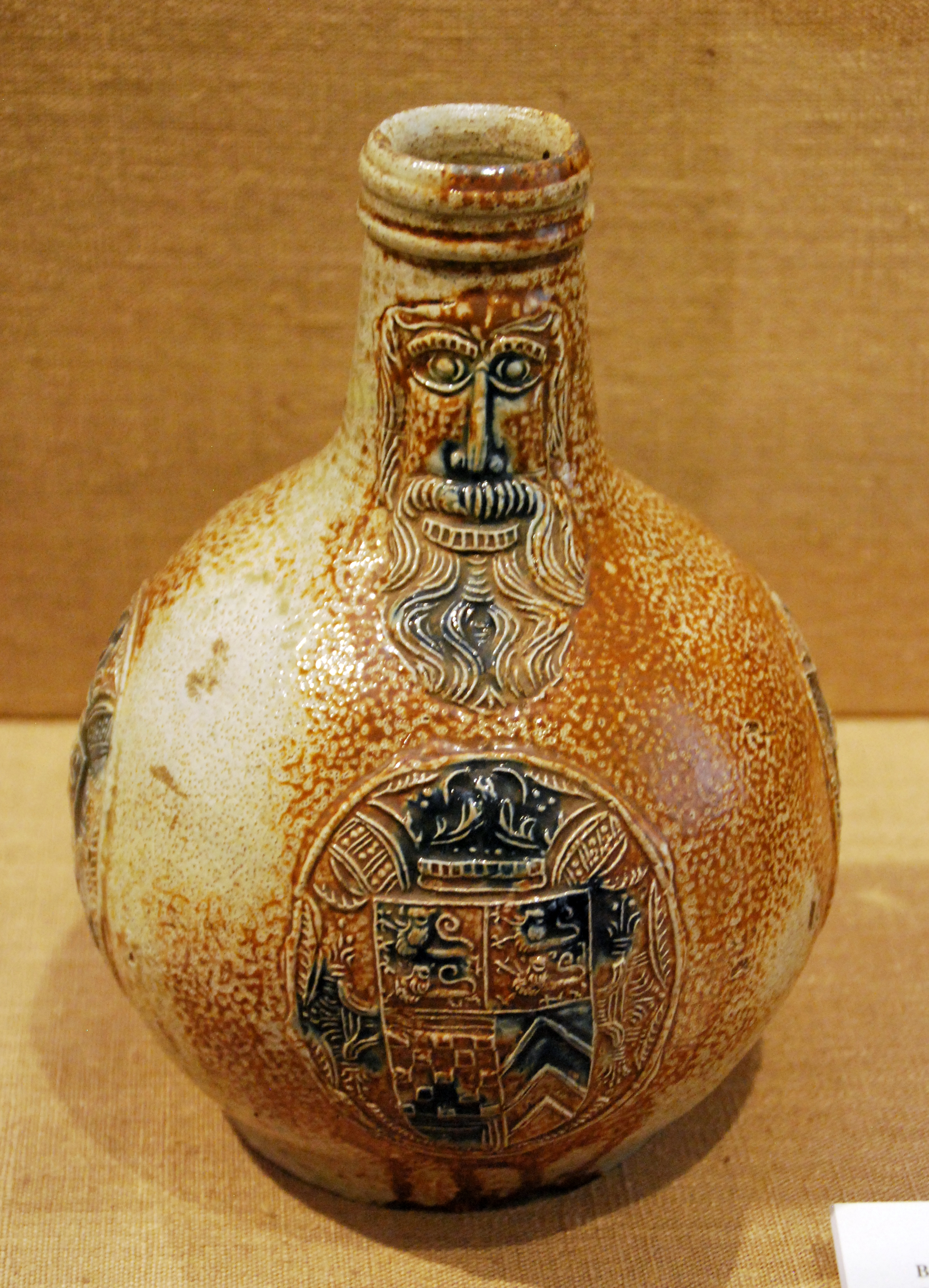
German Bartmann jug, c. 1600

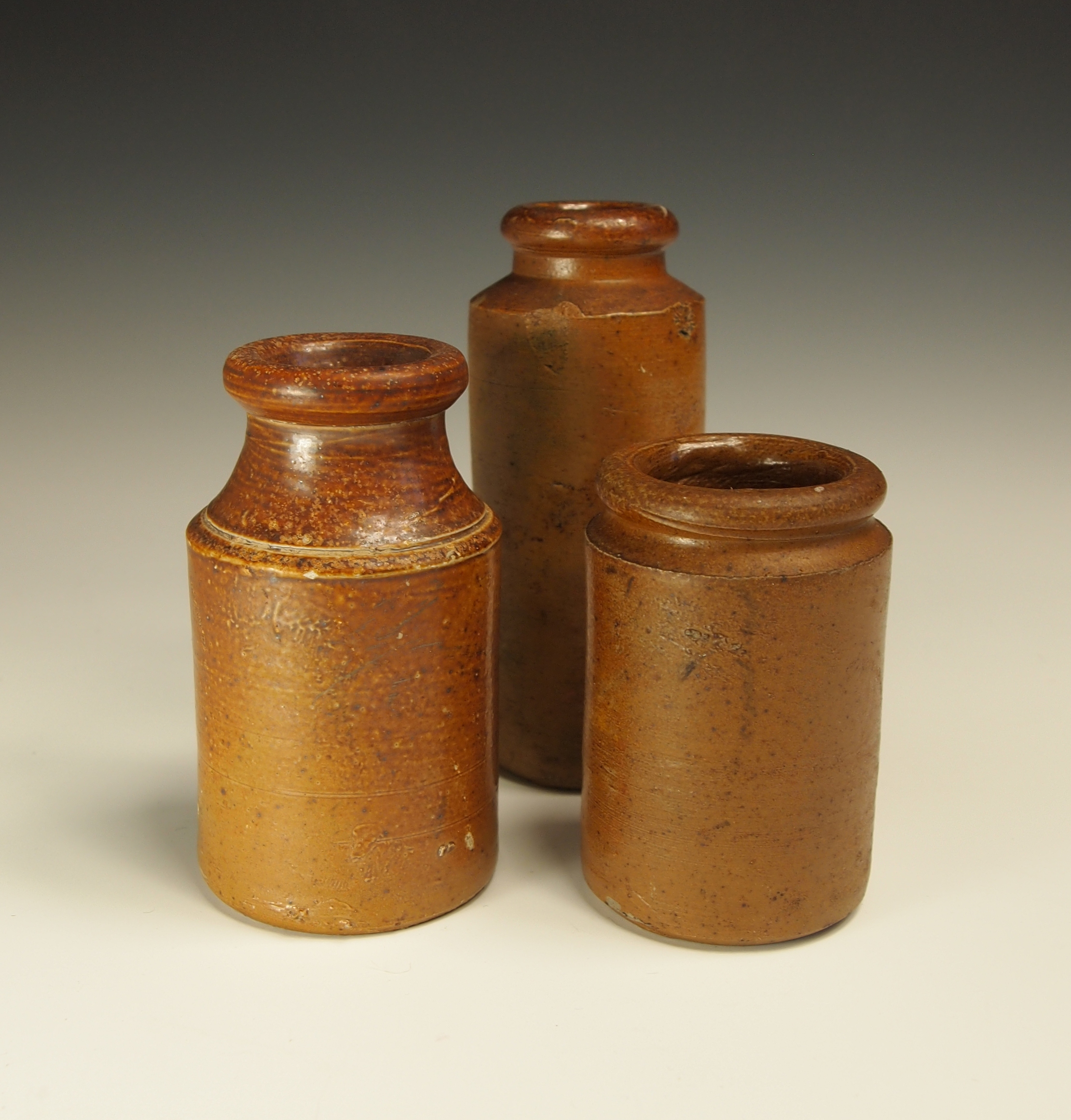
Salt glazed containers

Salt-glaze or salt glaze pottery is pottery, usually stoneware, with a ceramic glaze of glossy, translucent and slightly orange-peel-like texture which was formed by throwing common salt into the kiln during the higher temperature part of the firing process. Sodium from the salt reacts with silica in the clay body to form a glassy coating of sodium silicate. The glaze may be colourless or may be coloured various shades of brown (from iron oxide), blue (from cobalt oxide), or purple (from manganese oxide).

Except for its use by a few studio potters, the process is obsolete. Before its demise, in the face of environmental clean air restrictions, it was last used in the production of salt-glazed sewer-pipes. The only commercial pottery in the UK currently licensed to produce salt glaze pottery is Errington Reay at Bardon Mill in Northumberland which was founded in 1878.

== History ==
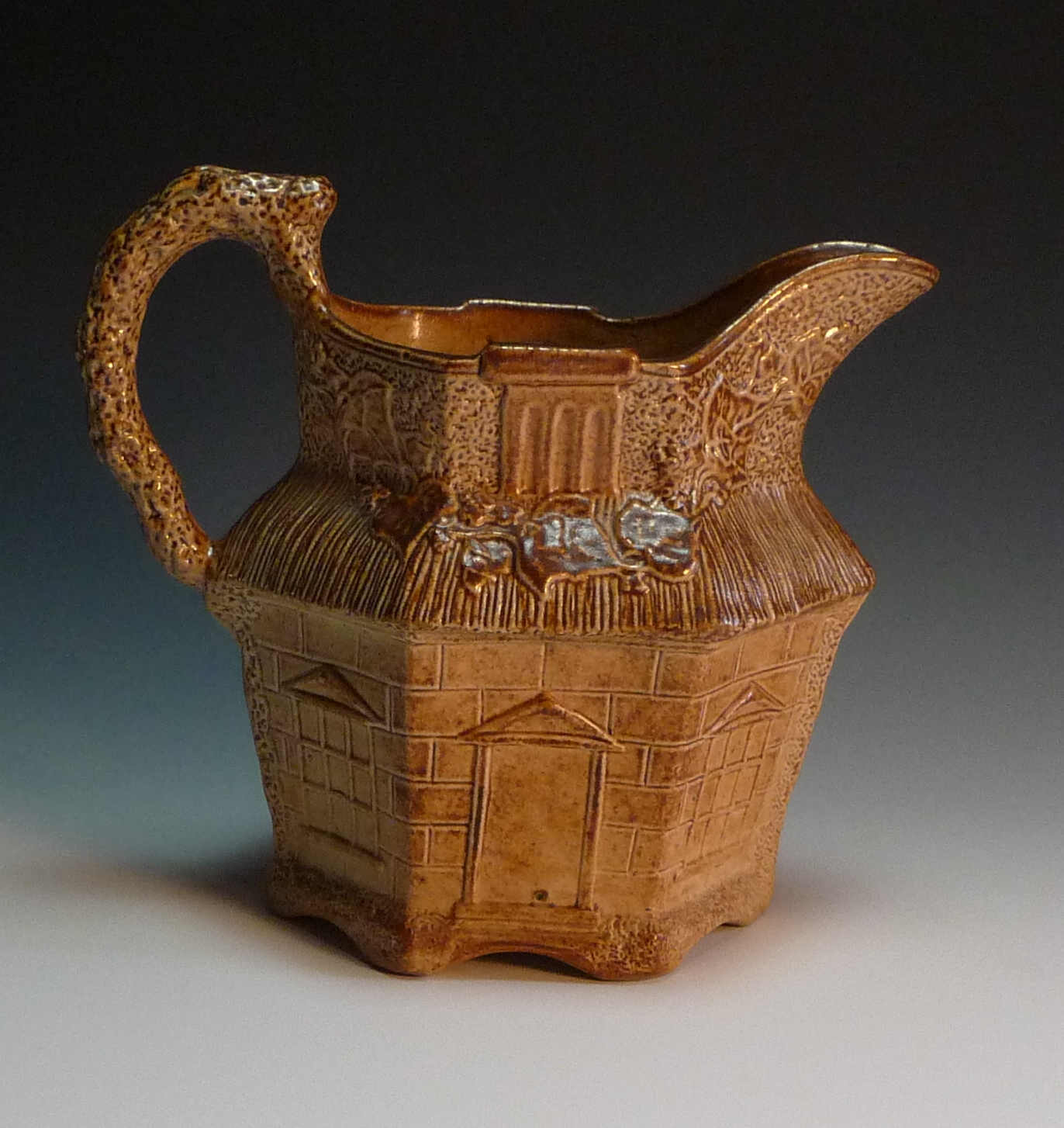
Salt glaze jug, 19th century

The earliest known production of salt glazed stoneware was in the Rhineland of Germany around 1400; it was effectively the only significant innovation in pottery of the European Middle Ages. Initially, the process was used on earthenware. By the 15th century, small pottery towns of the Westerwald, including Höhr-Grenzhausen, Siegburg, Köln, and Raeren in Flanders, were producing a salt-glazed stoneware, with the Bartmann jug a typical product. In the 17th century, salt glaze gained popularity in England as well as in Colonial America. Westerwald Pottery was characterized by stamped medallions and the use of a cobalt oxide based colorant for decoration. Production of salt glaze pottery in Westerwald ceased because of environmental considerations in 1983.

In the UK during the 17th century and 18th century, high quality salt-glazed stoneware was produced in Derbyshire, Nottinghamshire, London and Staffordshire. Salt glazed pottery was also popular in North America from the early 17th century until the early 19th century, indeed it was the dominant domestic pottery there during the 19th century. Whilst its manufacture in America increased from the earliest dated production, the 1720s in Yorktown, significant amounts were imported from Britain until around the mid-19th century.

During the 20th century, the technique was promoted for studio pottery use by Bernard Leach. In the 1950s, it was introduced into Japanese craft pottery through Leach's association with Shōji Hamada. Don Reitz introduced salt glazing into the curriculum at Alfred University in New York in 1959, and it subsequently spread to other American universities with ceramic art programs.

Due to concerns of significant amount of air pollution resulting from the process environmental clean air restrictions led to the demise of widespread use of salt glazing. It was last used on any large scale for the production of salt-glazed sewer-pipes, and other than limited use by some studio potters the process is obsolete, although there are reports of it still being used for sewer-pipes in India.

=== English salt glaze stoneware ===
Experiments in stoneware production began in England during the second part of the 17th century. The earliest evidence has been dated 1650–1700 at the site of a kiln at Woolwich Ferry, London. The similarity of the ware to German products of a similar era has led it to be attributed to immigrant potters.

A significant English manufacturer of salt glaze pottery was John Dwight at the Fulham Pottery, which he founded in 1672. In a related patent application, which was granted in 1671, he also claimed to have "discovered the mystery of transparent earthenware commonly knowne by the name of porcelaine or China and Persian ware."

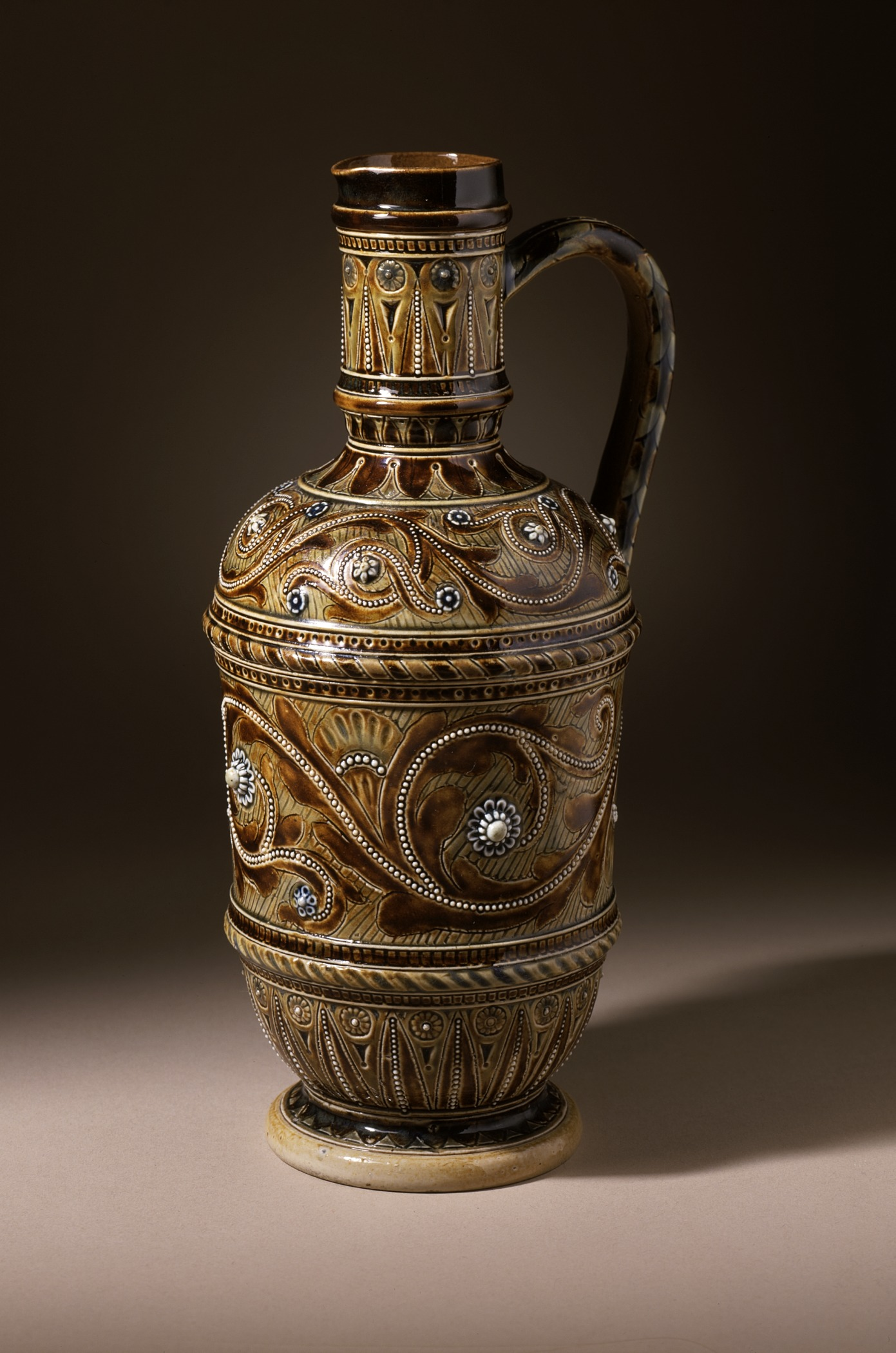
Salt glazed jug by Doulton. England, 1875

By the 1800s Lambeth in London had become a centre for the production of salt glaze stoneware, and most especially after the establishment of Doulton and Watts Pottery, which later became Royal Doulton. The company was founded in 1815 when John Doulton formed a partnership with the owner, Martha Jones and foreman, John Watts, of an existing pottery in Lambeth. Initially the factory specialised in utilitarian salt glazed stoneware, similar to that produced by the Fulham factories. During the 1830s and 1840s, considerable amounts of salt-glazed sewer-pipes were produced by Doultons following Sir Edwin Chadwick's advocacy of improved sanitary conditions. Doultons were also one of the earliest manufacturers of electrical insulators, initially using salt glaze stoneware and for the electrical telegraph systems. Also, from about 1830, they started production of salt glaze stoneware vessels, which were valued for their acid resistance, for the emerging chemical industries. From the 1850s Doulton & Co.'s decorative stoneware, that was produced in association with the nearby Lambeth School of Art, enjoyed significant success at various international exhibitions, including at The Great Exhibition in 1851, Philadelphia Exhibition in 1876, and also at Chicago in 1893. Their salt glaze decorative products became known as 'Doulton Ware'. By 1890 their decorative stoneware were so successful that 350 designers and artists were employed at the Lambeth factory, including the famous George Tinworth. Doulton’s Lambeth factory closed in 1956, due largely to new clean air regulations that prohibited the production of salt glaze in the urban environment. Production, but not of salt glazing, was transferred to their factory in Burslem which had been established in 1877.

Several other stoneware potteries also operated in Lambeth between the mid-18th & 19th centuries, including James Stiff and Sons and Stephen Green's Imperial pottery. The former having started his pottery career at Doulton in 1830, before opening his own factory in 1843.

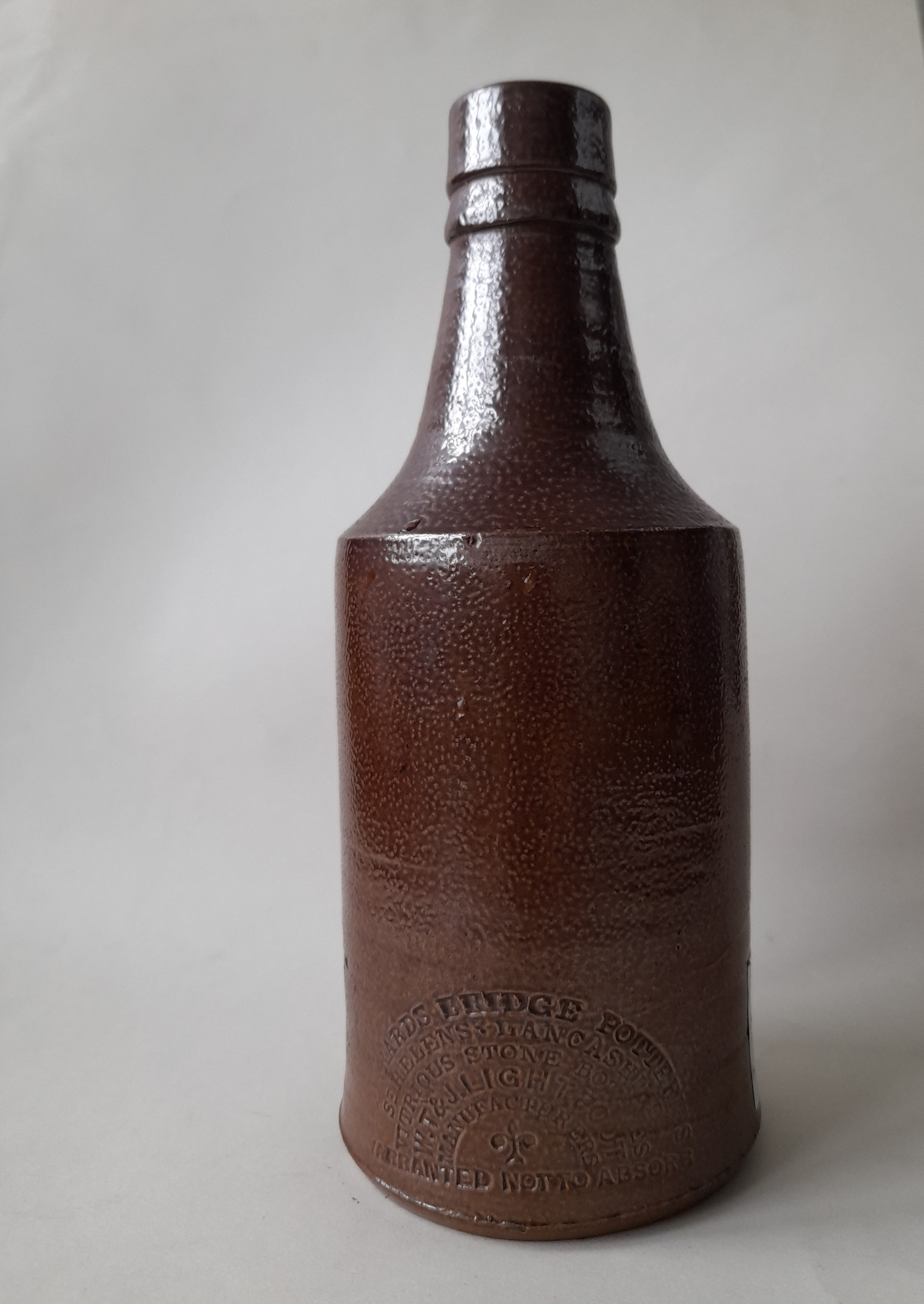
C19th ''Vitrious Stone Bottle", Gerrards Bridge Pottery, St Helens, Lancashire for porter/beer.

=== New world ===
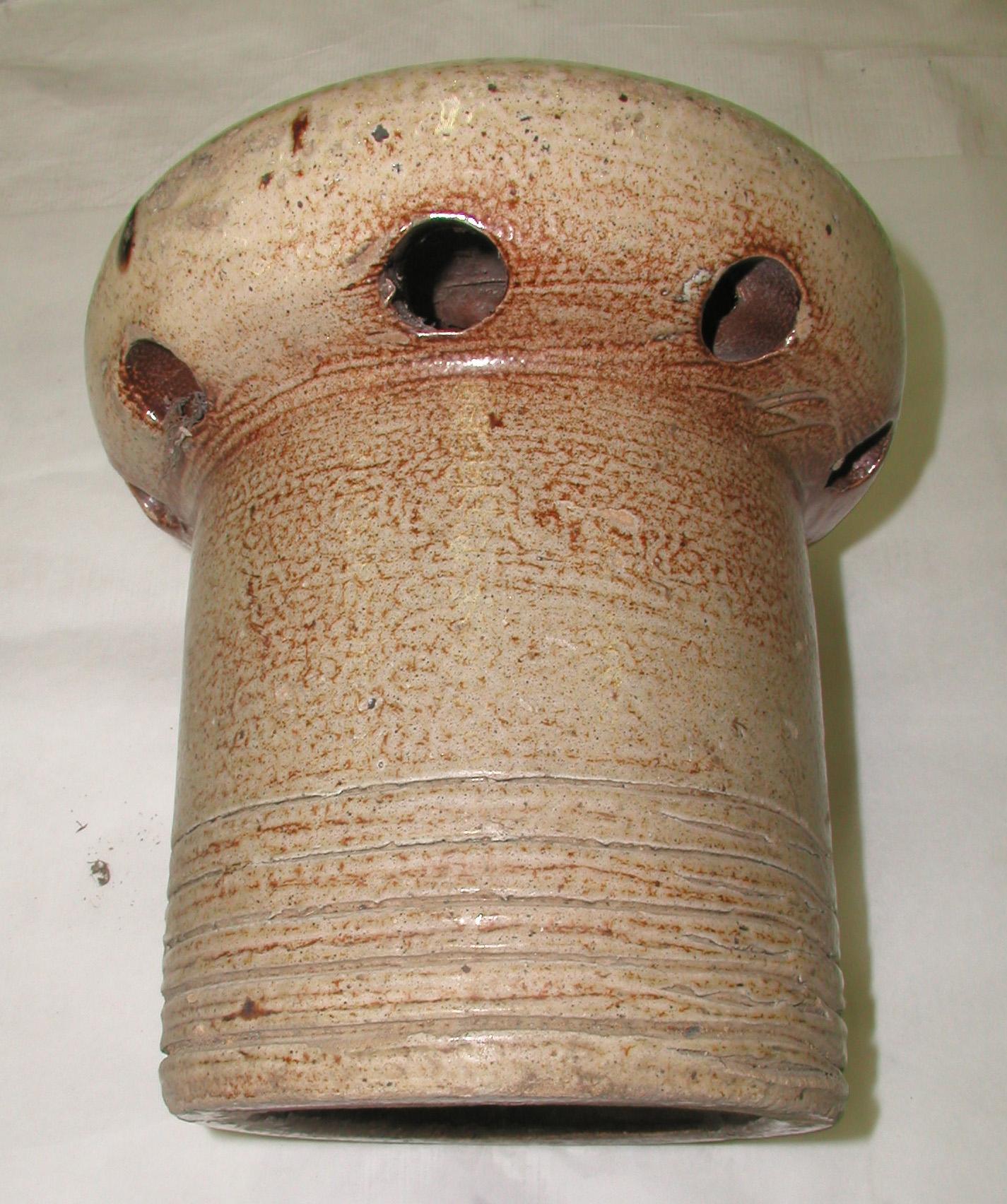
Salt-glazed pipe vent, New Zealand, 1910–1936

One of the first potteries in the US was on Bean Hill in Norwich, Connecticut. They manufactured yellow-brown, salt-glazed earthenware. According to a rather dubious local legend, their salt glaze technique was discovered in about 1680 by a servant. There was an earthenware vessel on the fire with brine in it to cure salt pork. While the servant was away the brine boiled over, the pot became red hot, and the sides were found to be glazed. A local potter utilized the discovery and salt glaze became established.

The earliest known production of salt glaze pottery in Australia has been dated to 1850–1883.

== Process ==
Pouring salt into a wood-fired kiln, using a carved-out piece of bamboo filled with salt soaked in water

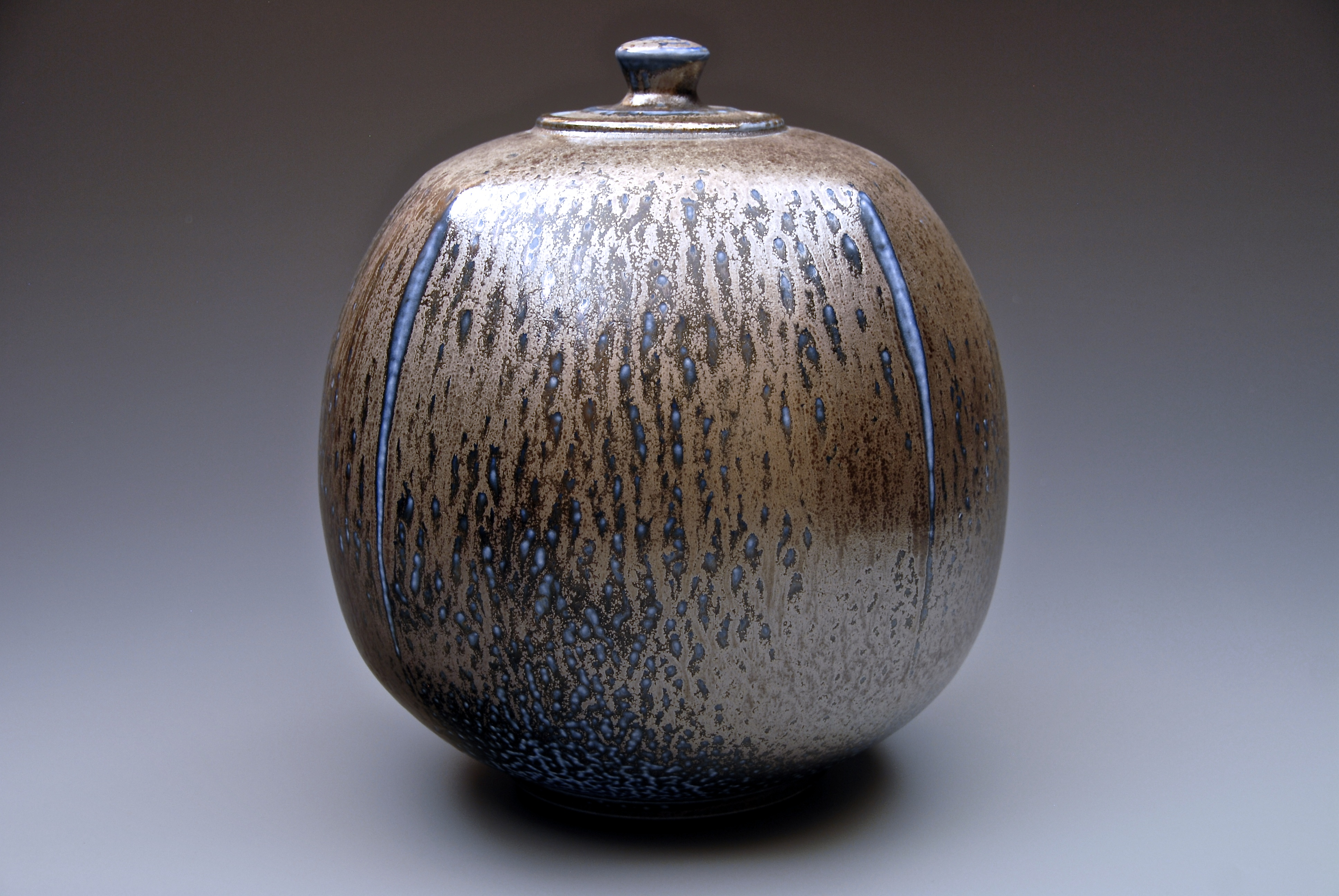
Modern salt-glazed porcelain piece

The salt glaze is formed on the unglazed body by reaction of common salt with the clay body constituents, particularly silica, toward the end of firing. The body should ideally be richer in silica than normal stoneware, and iron impurities can help produce good salt glazes. A reduction atmosphere can be employed as the reduced iron silicates are very powerful fluxes.

The salting mixture of sodium chloride and water is introduced into the kiln when the appropriate temperature is reached, typically around 900 °C, or salt can be placed inside the kiln prior to firing. As the kiln reaches higher temperatures, typically 1100–1200 °C, the sodium chloride vaporizes and reacts with steam to form hydrogen chloride and soda. These vapors react with the silica in the body and other body constituents. A glaze of fairly high alumina content (0.6 molecular parts) and a relatively low silica content (2.6 molecular parts), and in which the main base is soda, is formed. Salt glazes have been improved by the addition of borax, and sometimes sodium nitrate, to the salting mixture. Colouring oxides can be incorporated in the salting mixture to give decorative effects, such as a kind of aventurine glaze.

Salt fumes in a firing atmosphere react in the following way:

2NaCl + 2H_{2}O → 2NaOH + 2HCl

2NaOH → Na_{2}O + H_{2}O

In soda firings the reaction is a little more direct, not requiring the presence of water vapor:

Na_{2}CO_{3} → Na_{2}O + CO_{2}

Both the hydrogen chloride and the carbon dioxide are gases; they do not react with the sodium oxide that binds with the silica and other components of the clay body. Hydrogen chloride leaving the kiln will form a hydrochloric acid vapour on contact with moisture in the air or kiln exhaust gases. Any remaining sodium oxide will form salt by reacting with hydrochloric acid vapour as the gases exit the kiln. The sodium oxide (Na_{2}O) reacts with the alumina and silica in the clay body to form a sodium alumino-silicate glaze. The general reaction is shown below, with the values for x and y varying dependent on the amounts of sodium oxide, alumina and silica composing the glaze:

Na_{2}O + SiO_{2} + Al_{2}O_{3}·(SiO_{2})_{2} → (Na_{2}O)_{x}·Al_{2}O_{3}·(SiO_{2})_{y}

Salt can also be used as a decorative element on selected individual pots. Biscuit ware can be soaked in a brine solution to create salted patterns. Rope and other textiles can also be soaked in brine and wrapped around biscuit ware. Salt can also be added, in solution, to coloured clay slips and can be sprinkled onto biscuit ware in protective, ceramic containers called saggars. A related technique, soda firing, substitutes soda ash or sodium bicarbonate for common salt. Whilst the application method is a little different, the alternatives need to be sprayed into the kiln, results are similar to salt glazing but for subtle differences in texture and colour.
