= Hilgert =

- Municipality
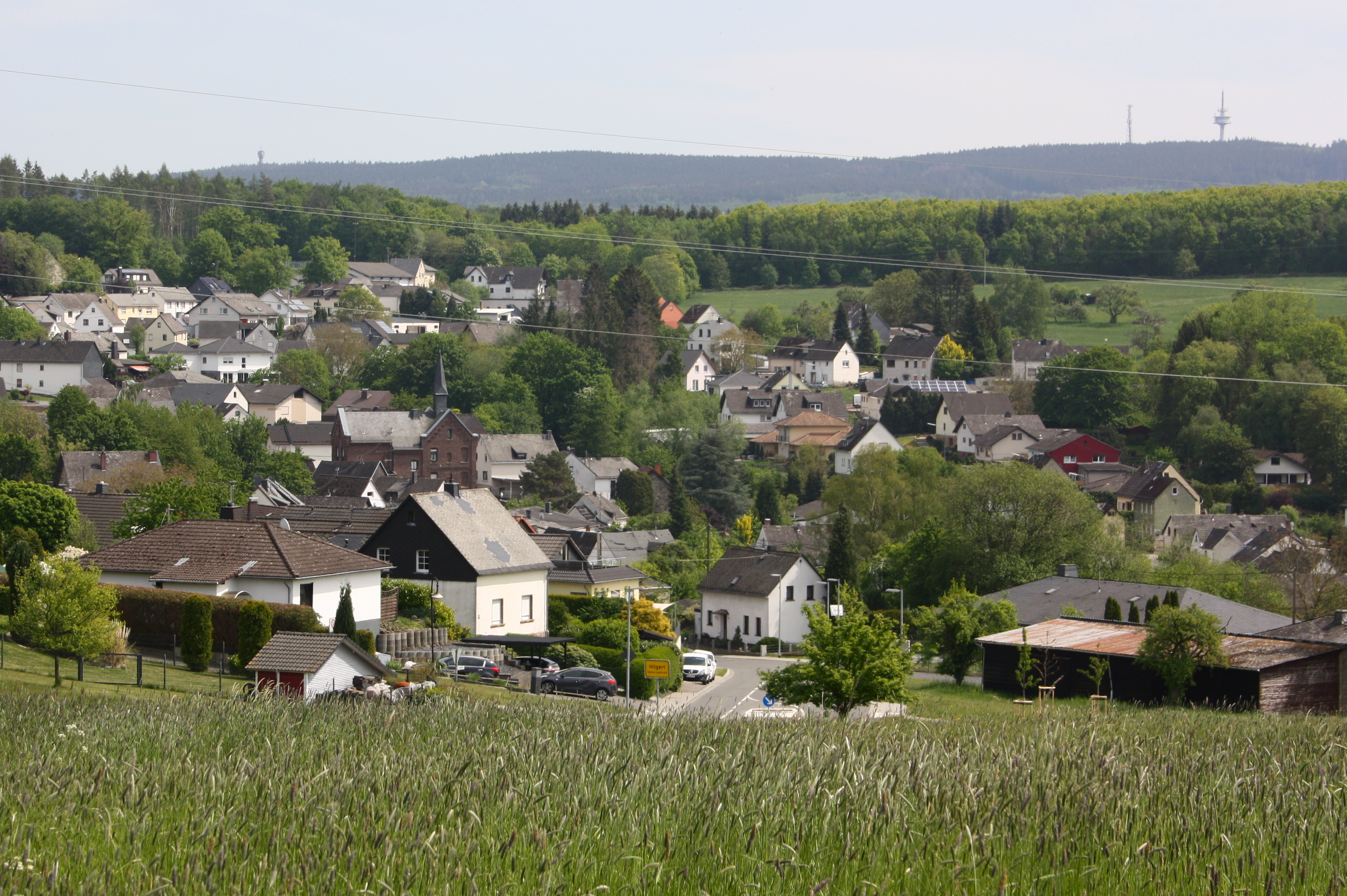

- Coat of arms

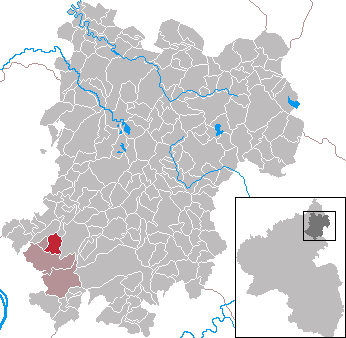
- Location of Hilgert within Westerwaldkreis district
- Interactive map of Hilgert
- Location within Germany Location within Rhineland-Palatinate
- Coordinates: 50°27′21″N 7°41′20″E
- Country: Germany
- State: Rhineland-Palatinate
- District: Westerwaldkreis
- Municipal assoc.: Höhr-Grenzhausen

Government
  - Mayor (2019–24): Uwe Schmidt (SPD)

Area
  - Total: 4.57 km^{2} (1.76 sq mi)
- Elevation: 300 m (980 ft)

Population (2025-12-31)
  - Total: 1,540
  - Density: 337/km^{2} (873/sq mi)
- Time zone: UTC+01:00 (CET)
  - Summer (DST): UTC+02:00 (CEST)
- Postal codes: 56206
- Dialling codes: 02624
- Vehicle registration: WW
- Website: www.gemeinde-hilgert.de

Hilgert in the Kannenbäckerland is an Ortsgemeinde – a community belonging to a Verbandsgemeinde – in the Westerwaldkreis in Rhineland-Palatinate, Germany.

== Geography ==
Hilgert lies roughly 13 km from Koblenz on the edge of the Nassau Nature Park. The community belongs to the Verbandsgemeinde of Höhr-Grenzhausen, a kind of collective municipality.

== History ==
Hilgert was first mentioned in documents dating to 1340.

== Politics ==
The municipal council is made up of 17 council members, including the extraofficial mayor (Bürgermeister), who were elected in a municipal election on 7 June 2009.

	CDU	SPD	FWG	Total
2004	6	6	4	16 seats

== Economy and infrastructure ==
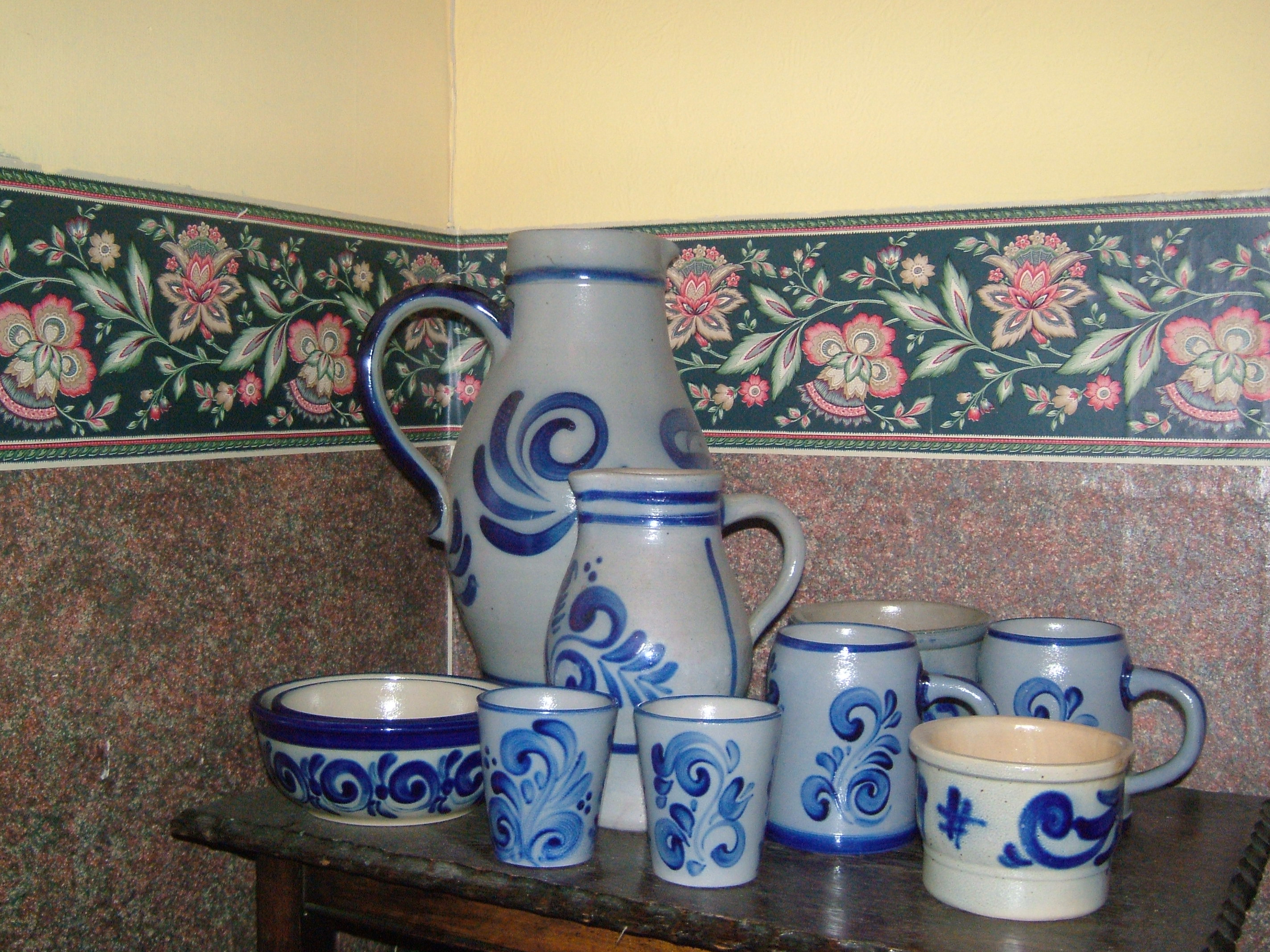
Westerwald ceramics

=== Transport ===
The A 48 with its Höhr-Grenzhausen interchange (AS 12) lies right near the municipal area, 3 km away. There is no rail connection, only an hourly bus to Koblenz.
