= Deesen =

- Municipality
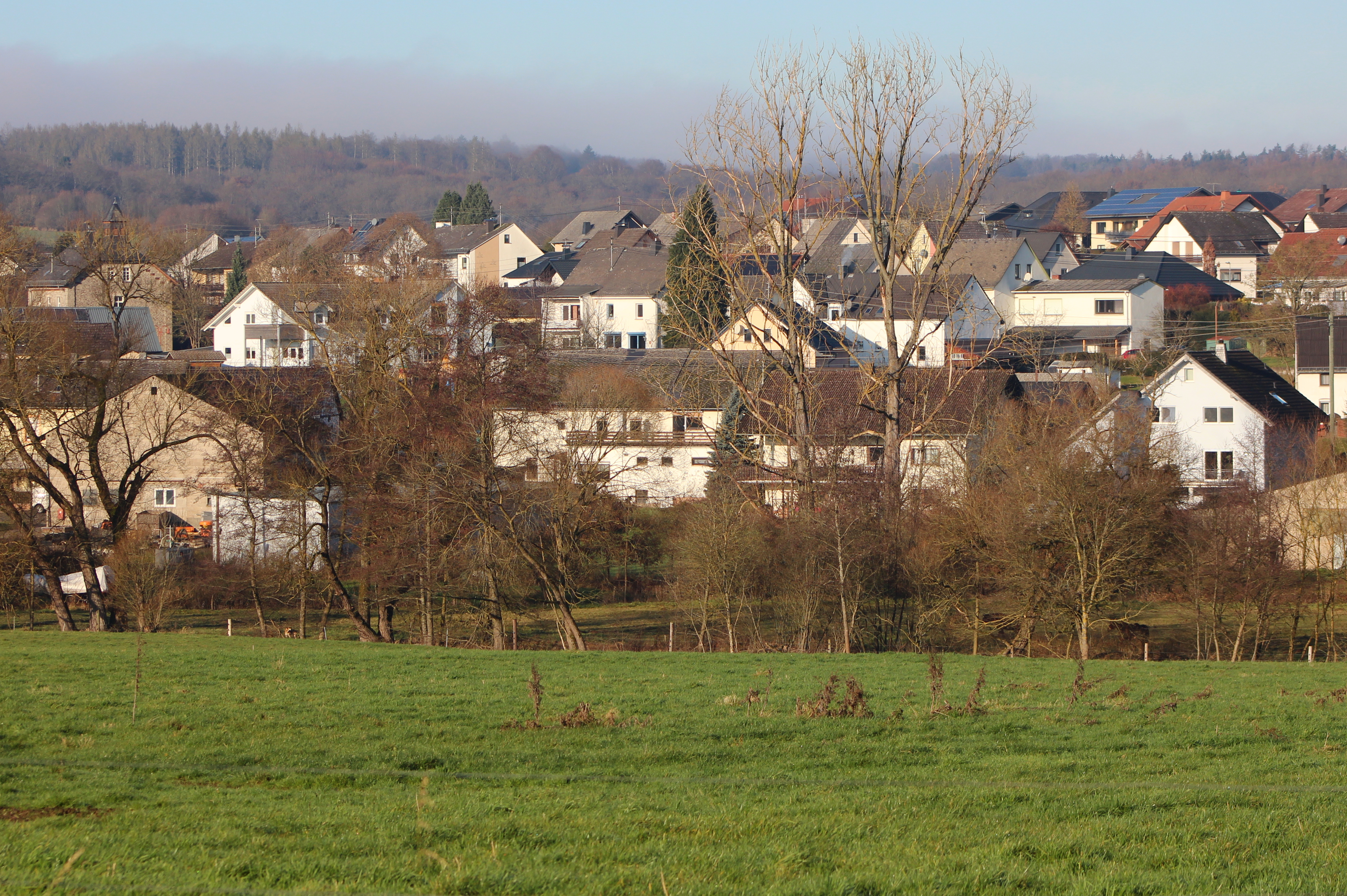

- Coat of arms

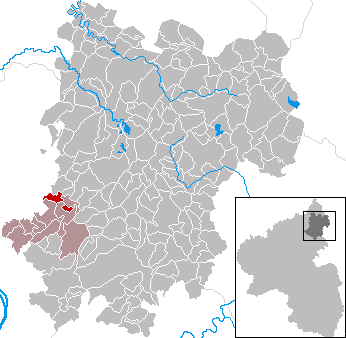
- Location of Deesen within Westerwaldkreis district
- Interactive map of Deesen
- Location within Germany Location within Rhineland-Palatinate
- Coordinates: 50°30′39″N 7°42′00″E
- Country: Germany
- State: Rhineland-Palatinate
- District: Westerwaldkreis
- Municipal assoc.: Ransbach-Baumbach

Government
  - Mayor (2019–24): Günter Kuhn

Area
  - Total: 3.4 km^{2} (1.3 sq mi)
- Elevation: 220 m (720 ft)

Population (2025-12-31)
  - Total: 785
  - Density: 230/km^{2} (600/sq mi)
- Time zone: UTC+01:00 (CET)
  - Summer (DST): UTC+02:00 (CEST)
- Postal codes: 56237
- Dialling codes: 02626
- Vehicle registration: WW
- Website: www.deesen.de

Deesen (German pronunciation: [ˈdeːzn̩]) is an Ortsgemeinde – a municipality belonging to a Verbandsgemeinde – in the Westerwaldkreis in Rhineland-Palatinate, Germany.

== Geography ==
The municipality lies in the Westerwald between Koblenz and Siegen on the edge of the Rhein-Westerwald Nature Park. The Saynbach, part of the Rhine's drainage basin, flows through the municipality. Deesen belongs to the Verbandsgemeinde of Ransbach-Baumbach, a kind of collective municipality.

== History ==
In 1218, Deesen had its first documentary mention as Desene when Burgrave Heinrich von Isenburg donated a Lichterzins to the Rommersdorf Abbey. The village itself is a few hundred years older. In 1271, the Rommersdorf Monastery sold Hermann von Desene various goods in Deesen. In 1531 the Mant family of Limbach had an estate in Deesen. Until 1664, it was Isenburg domain, and thereafter Electorate of Trier domain until 1803 when it became part of the Duchy of Nassau. In 1866, the village passed to Prussia. The customs house and lordly inn in Deesen's municipal area is mentioned in 1667 and 1723. The old school is under protection as a monument.

== Politics ==
The municipal council is made up of 13 council members, including the extraofficial mayor (Bürgermeister), who were elected in a municipal election on 7 June 2009.

	WG Bendel	Total
2004	12	12 Seats

== Economy and infrastructure ==
The A 3 with its Mogendorf interchange (AS 38) lies 7 km away. The nearest InterCityExpress stop is the railway station at Montabaur on the Cologne-Frankfurt high-speed rail line, which runs straight through the municipality.
