= Hillscheid =

- Municipality
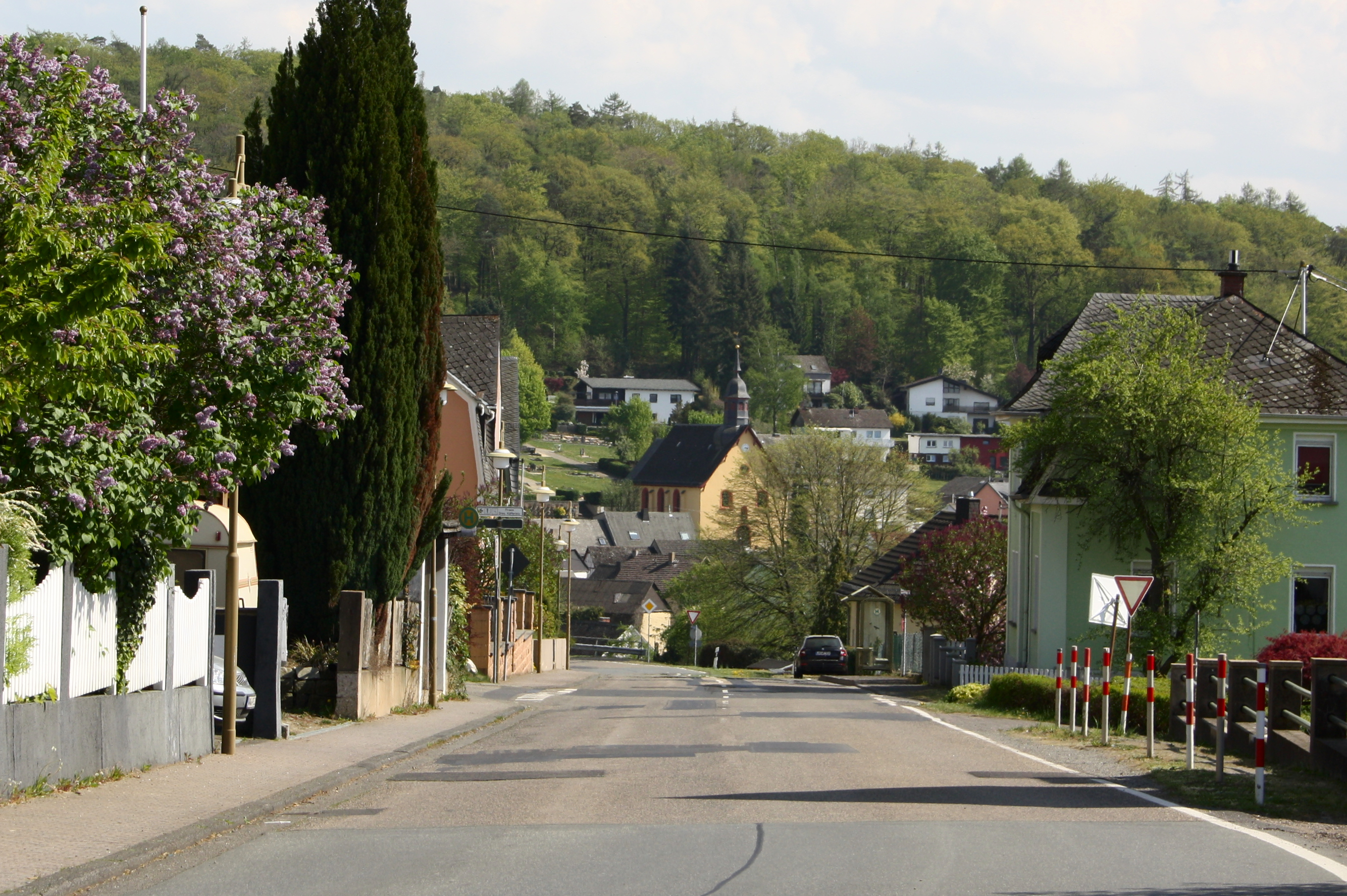

- Coat of arms

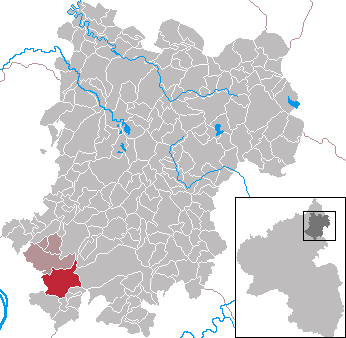
- Location of Hillscheid within Westerwaldkreis district
- Interactive map of Hillscheid
- Location within Germany Location within Rhineland-Palatinate
- Coordinates: 50°24′23″N 7°41′55″E
- Country: Germany
- State: Rhineland-Palatinate
- District: Westerwaldkreis
- Municipal assoc.: Höhr-Grenzhausen

Government
  - Mayor (2019–24): Andreas Rath

Area
  - Total: 14.08 km^{2} (5.44 sq mi)
- Elevation: 300 m (980 ft)

Population (2025-12-31)
  - Total: 2,438
  - Density: 173.2/km^{2} (448.5/sq mi)
- Time zone: UTC+01:00 (CET)
  - Summer (DST): UTC+02:00 (CEST)
- Postal codes: 56204
- Dialling codes: 02624
- Vehicle registration: WW
- Website: www.hillscheid.de

Hillscheid is an Ortsgemeinde – a community belonging to a Verbandsgemeinde – in the Westerwaldkreis in Rhineland-Palatinate, Germany.

== Geography ==
Hillscheid lies northeast of Koblenz on the edge of the Nassau Nature Park. The community belongs to the Verbandsgemeinde of Höhr-Grenzhausen, a kind of collective municipality.

== History ==
Many finds in the area of the village meadows show that there were already Celtic settlers here in Hallstatt and La Tène times. With the building of the limes came the Romans. They built not only walls, moats and watchtowers, whose traces can still sometimes still be made out, but also a small fort, whose outer foundations, however, may now only be viewed in reconstruction.

It is assumed that the community of Hillscheid came into being sometime between 959 and 994. The community's first documentary mention, as Hiensceit, appears in a document uttered by Archbishop of Trier Ludolf (994-1008) about the year 1000. At the request of Abbess Mathilde zu Essen (974-1011), daughter of Swabian duke Liudolf and granddaughter of Otto I, Holy Roman Emperor and Swabian duke Hermann I, who himself was Count of the Engersgau and lord of a great area around Montabaur, the Archbishop of Trier Ludolf transferred to St. Florin's Monastery at Koblenz tithing rights to Hana (Höhn), Hiensceit (Hillscheid), Mannechenrot (Mangeroth, now abandoned) and Agerin (Niederähren), and in return exchanged Aschebach (Eschelbach). Hillscheid, however, was not in the monastery’s hands for long.

Vallendar was the mother church for the surrounding area and thereby also for Hillscheid and places nearby. Hillscheid belonged, along with Vallendar to the Engersgau, which had its first documentary mention in 773. It was coëxtensive with the Deanery of Engers, to which Vallendar with Hillscheid and the parish's other communities belonged.

Near Hillscheid lay the two now forsaken villages of Cudilbach (Kühlbach) and Felderhusen (Pfarrhausen). They found their place in Hillscheid's coat of arms, represented by two jugs.

Hillscheid itself was largely destroyed in the Thirty Years' War, recovering rather quickly, however, and from 1683, it had a chapel. It only remained part of the parish of Vallendar until 1812. For the most part, Vallendar had two lords: Sayn-Wittgenstein and the Electorate of Trier. Once France had conquered the areas on the Rhine’s left bank and the Electorate of Trier had been beaten, the Electorate’s former territories on the Rhine’s right bank, and thereby also Vallendar and Hillscheid, passed under Napoleon to the Duchy of Nassau-Weilburg in 1803 as a result of the so-called Reichsdeputationshauptschluss.

After Napoleon was overthrown, Vallendar became Prussian with the creation of the Rhine Province, whereas Hillscheid and Höhr near Nassau remained in the Duchy of Nassau and were assigned to the Amt of Montabaur.

After Prussia’s conquest and occupation of the Duchy of Nassau, Hillscheid became part of the Prussian province of Hesse-Nassau, and in 1867, through restructuring of authority, part of the new Unterwesterwaldkreis (district).

In the Second World War, Hillscheid was mostly spared any great war damage, although there was a rocket launching site near Hillscheid (Hillscheider Stock) from which many V-2 rockets were launched. Furthermore, artillery and flak units were stationed in Hillscheid. Late in the war, these engaged in a heavy firefight with the US artillery near Koblenz, resulting in several deaths in Hillscheid.

In 1946, the Unterwesterwaldkreis and along with it the community of Hillscheid were assigned to the new Bundesland of Rhineland-Palatinate, belonging at first to the Regierungsbezirk of Montabaur. Through its dissolution in 1968, administrative reform in 1971 and district reform in 1974, Hillscheid is today part of the Verbandsgemeinde of Höhr-Grenzhausen within the Westerwaldkreis, itself formed out of the old districts of the Unterwesterwaldkreis and the Oberwesterwaldkreis.

== Politics ==
=== Community council ===
The council is made up of 20 council members, including the extraofficial mayor (Bürgermeister), who were elected in a municipal election on 7 June 2009.

	CDU	SPD	FWG	Total
2004	11	7	2	20 seats

=== Mayor ===
The mayor is Andreas Rath.

== Culture and sightseeing ==
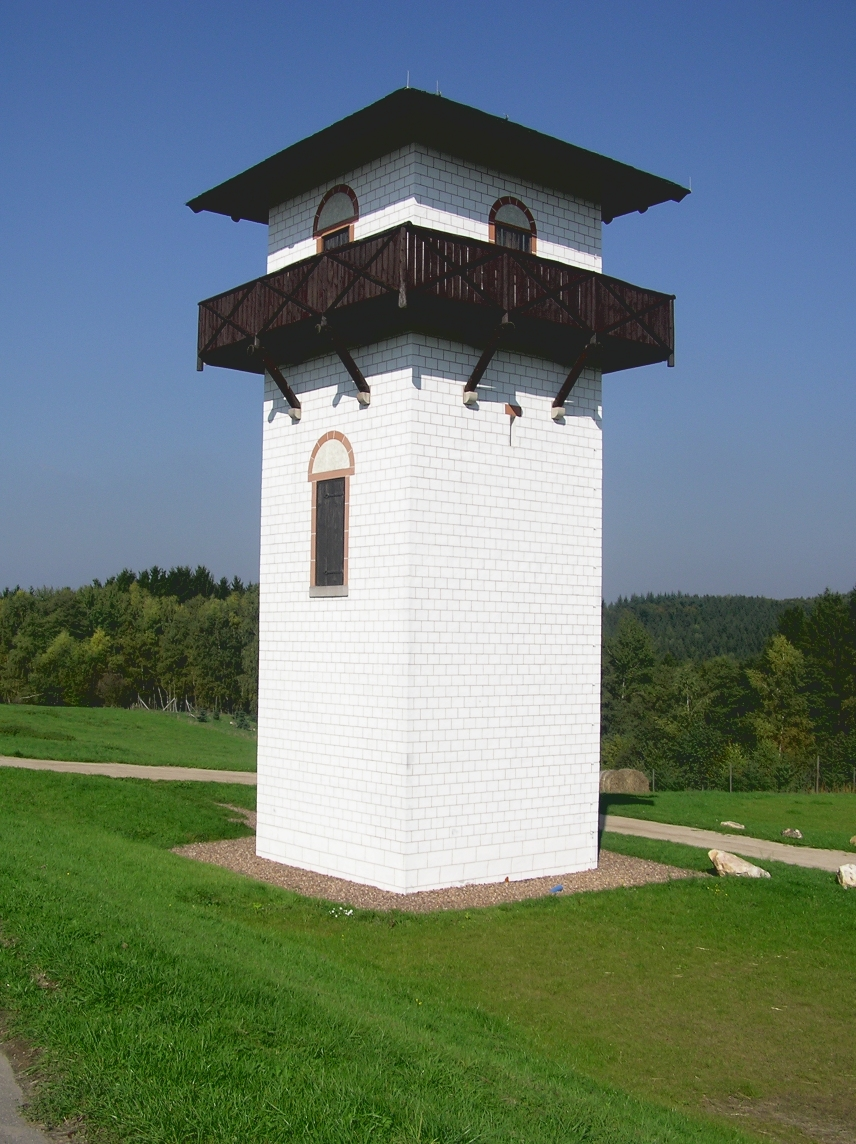
Reconstructed Roman watchtower

=== Museums ===
- In the community is found a small but thoroughly interesting local museum.
- At the edge of the community, a Limes tower has been reconstructed.
- A short walk into the forest are the reconstructed foundations of the small Roman fort that stood at this spot. Archaeological digs have brought to light information about the structure's original condition.

=== Music ===
There are three music clubs in Hillscheid, the MGV Eintracht, the MGV Edelweiß and the Musikverein Hillscheid. (MGV = Männergesangverein, or “men’s singing club”)

== Economy and infrastructure ==
=== Transport ===
Since the branch line of the Engers-Au railway from Grenzau to Hillscheid is out of service, Hillscheid is only served by local busses. The village is located in the area of the transport association Verkehrsverbund Rhein-Mosel (VRM), zone number 401. The Bundesstraße 49 is linking Koblenz and Montabaur lies 5 km to the south. The A 48 with its Höhr-Grenzhausen interchange (AS 12) lies 6 km away. There was a stop of the branch line Grenzau - Höhr-Grenzhausen - Hillscheid of the Engers-Au railway in Hillscheid which is out of service today.

=== Education ===
In Hillscheid there is a primary school with a sport hall. Also there are Catholic and communal kindergartens.

=== Other ===
At 50°25′27″N 7°43′55″E is found a 99-m-tall transmitter owned by Deutsche Telekom AG, which bears the nickname Alarmstange (roughly, “signal mast”).
