= Caan, Germany =

Caan
- Municipality
- Coat of arms

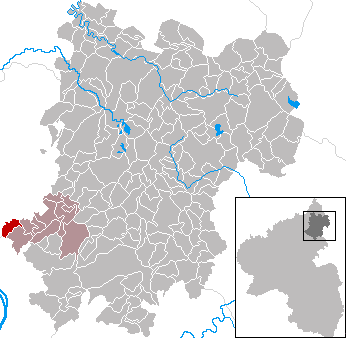
- Location of Caan within Westerwaldkreis district
- Interactive map of Caan
- Location within Germany Location within Rhineland-Palatinate
- Coordinates: 50°28′29″N 7°36′39″E
- Country: Germany
- State: Rhineland-Palatinate
- District: Westerwaldkreis
- Municipal assoc.: Ransbach-Baumbach

Government
  - Mayor (2019–24): Roland Lorenz

Area
  - Total: 3.45 km^{2} (1.33 sq mi)
- Elevation: 297 m (974 ft)

Population (2025-12-31)
  - Total: 658
  - Density: 191/km^{2} (494/sq mi)
- Time zone: UTC+01:00 (CET)
  - Summer (DST): UTC+02:00 (CEST)
- Postal codes: 56237
- Dialling codes: 02601
- Vehicle registration: WW
- Website: www.caan.de

Caan (German pronunciation: [kaːn]) is an Ortsgemeinde – a municipality belonging to a Verbandsgemeinde – in the Westerwaldkreis in Rhineland-Palatinate, Germany.

== Geography ==
The municipality lies in the Westerwald between Koblenz and Siegen on the edge of the Kannenbäckerland. Caan belongs to the Verbandsgemeinde of Ransbach-Baumbach, a kind of collective municipality.

== History ==
In 1250, Caan had its first documentary mention. The name Caan describes an old settlement from the noble family "von Kane." In 1352, the Dietkirchen monastery acquired a share of land. A quarry was in operation in Caan in 1756.

== Politics ==
The municipal council is made up of 12 council members who were elected in a majority vote in a municipal election on 7 June 2009.

The current mayor is Roland Lorenz.

== Economy and infrastructure ==
West of the municipality runs Bundesstraße 413 linking Koblenz and Hachenburg. The A 48 with its Höhr-Grenzhausen interchange (AS 12) lies 8 km away. The nearest InterCityExpress stop is the railway station at Montabaur on the Cologne-Frankfurt high-speed rail line.

== Coat of arms ==
Coat of Arms of Caan

The Caans coat of arms has three red eagles in the upper part of the shield to reference the original members of the village. The blue wavy line symbolizes the stream in the town, called the Rucksbach, and the red jug at the bottom indicates the connection to the place name of Caan.
