= Karlheinz Zöller =

- Born: 24 August 1928; Höhr-Grenzhausen, Germany
- Died: 29 July 2005 (aged 76) Berlin, Germany
- Genres: Classical
- Occupations: Musician, professor
- Instrument: Flute
- Formerly of: Berlin Philharmonic Orchestra

Karlheinz Zöller (24 August 1928 – 29 July 2005) was a German flutist, and solo fluteplayer in the Berlin Philharmonic Orchestra between 1960–1969 and 1976–1993.

== Early life and education ==
Karlheinz Zöller was born in Höhr-Grenzhausen (near Frankfurt), Westerwald, Germany.

He began his studies in Frankfurt and later studied with Kurt Redel in Detmold. While in Detmold, he met his wife-to-be Gertrud, herself a flautist studying under Hans-Peter Schmitz. After World War II, at the age of 17, he obtained a position in the Frankfurt Opera Orchestra. He had not yet attended college but the experience was invaluable. After engagements in Cologne and Herford, he joined the Berlin Philharmonic Orchestra as solo flautist in 1960.

== Teaching ==
In 1968, Zöller was appointed professor at the Hamburg Music Academy, and later he taught at the Hochschule der Künste in Berlin and at the Hamburg Music Academy.

Zöller and his wife became renowned as a teaching team and one of their students later recalled, "extensive technical training, especially from her, and music and tone, from him." Many of his former students later played with orchestras all over Europe or became music professors themselves; Roswitha Staege became professor of flute at the Berlin Arts Academy; Wolfgang Ritter became solo flautist with the North German Radio Symphony Orchestra; Maren Distel became a celebrated flautist as well; Michael Faust became solo flautist with the Westdeutscher Rundfunk Sinfonieorchester in 1988 and professor at the Musik Hochschule in Düsseldorf.

== New music ==
Zöller was a tremendous supporter of new music and commissioned flute concerti from several composers. These included new works by Siegfried Matthus, Diether de la Motte, Manfred Trojahn and Isang Yun.

== Personal tragedy ==
In 1968, while travelling in a taxi from the hotel to the concert hall in Buenos Aires, Zöller was critically injured in an accident. The cab driver died and Zöller's lung was pierced by a piece of metal. This severely limited his lung capacity and as a result he was replaced by James Galway as principal flautist with the Berlin Philharmonic. However, he remained active as a chamber and solo player and maintained a busy teaching and concert schedule. Later, in the 1970s, he had an operation to reattach his non-functional lung. The operation was a success and Zöller regained his position as principal flautist with the Philharmonic, when Galway left to teach at the Eastman School of Music.

== Family life ==
After Gertrud's death, Karlheinz married Anna-Luise some years later. She had children and grandchildren from a former marriage and Karlheinz took them to heart as his own.

Zöller died of cancer in Berlin on 29 July 2005.
