= Höhr-Grenzhausen (Verbandsgemeinde) =

- Verbandsgemeinde
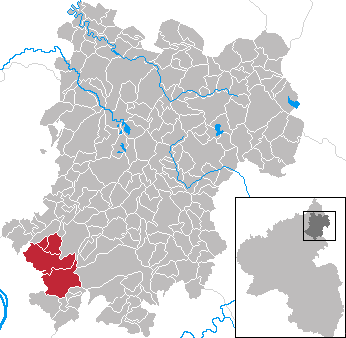
- Location of Höhr-Grenzhausen within Westerwaldkreis district
- Interactive map of Höhr-Grenzhausen
- Location within Germany Location within Rhineland-Palatinate
- Coordinates: 50°26′N 7°40′E
- Country: Germany
- State: Rhineland-Palatinate
- District: Westerwaldkreis
- Seat: Höhr-Grenzhausen
- Subdivisions: 4 municipalities

Area
  - Total: 35.86 km^{2} (13.85 sq mi)

Population (2025-12-31)
  - Total: 13,589
  - Density: 378.9/km^{2} (981.5/sq mi)
- Time zone: UTC+01:00 (CET)
  - Summer (DST): UTC+02:00 (CEST)
- Website: www.hoehr-grenzhausen.de

Höhr-Grenzhausen is a Verbandsgemeinde ("collective municipality") in the district Westerwaldkreis, in Rhineland-Palatinate, Germany. The seat of the Verbandsgemeinde is in Höhr-Grenzhausen.

The Verbandsgemeinde Höhr-Grenzhausen consists of the following Ortsgemeinden ("local municipalities"):

1. Hilgert
2. Hillscheid
3. Höhr-Grenzhausen
4. Kammerforst
