= Alsbach, Westerwaldkreis =

Alsbach
- Municipality
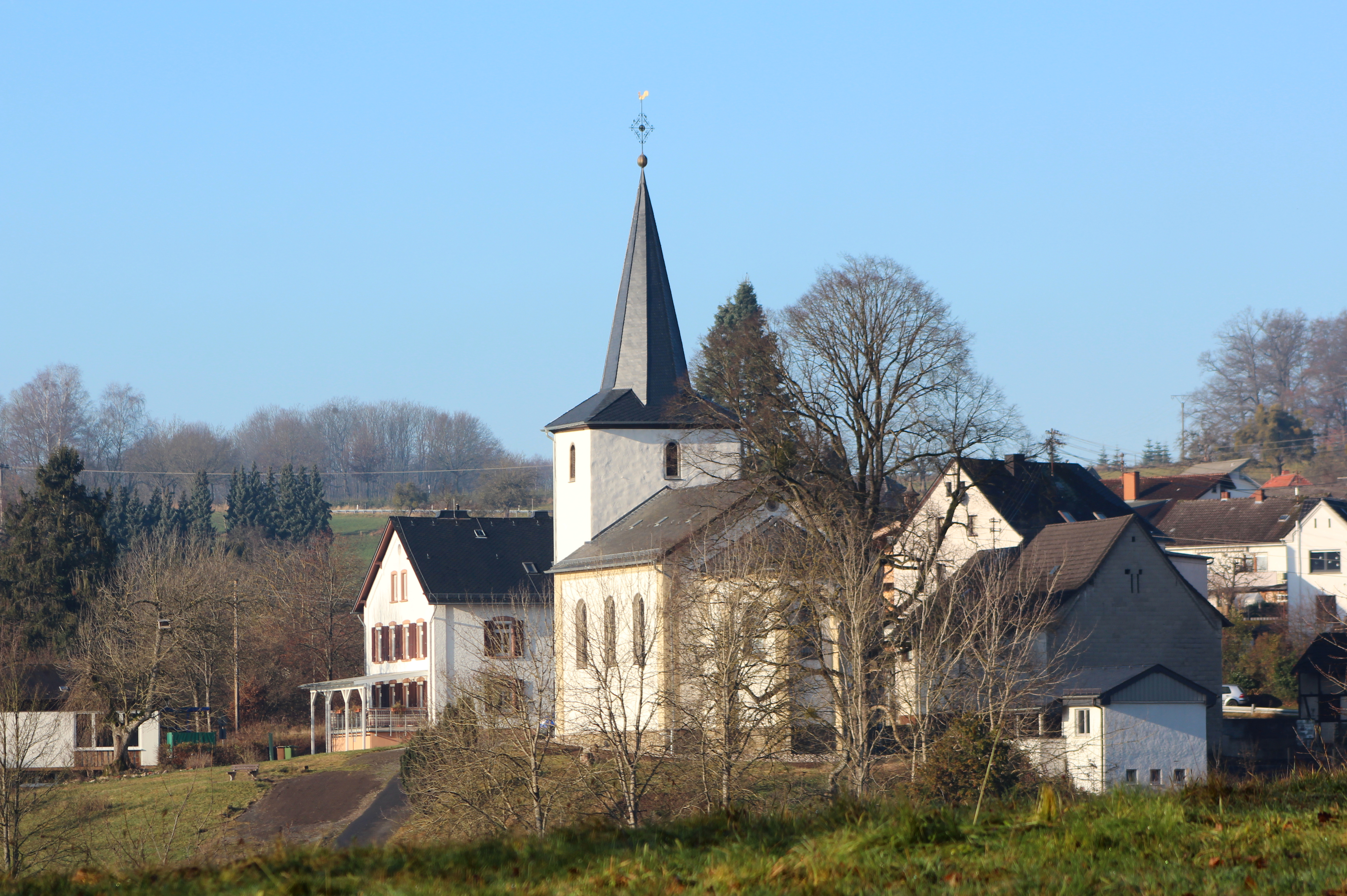

- Coat of arms

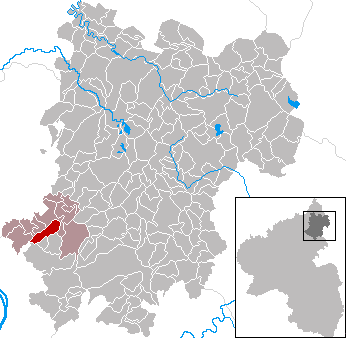
- Location of Alsbach within Westerwaldkreis district
- Interactive map of Alsbach
- Location within Germany Location within Rhineland-Palatinate
- Coordinates: 50°27′56″N 7°39′43″E
- Country: Germany
- State: Rhineland-Palatinate
- District: Westerwaldkreis
- Municipal assoc.: Ransbach-Baumbach

Government
  - Mayor (2019–24): Heike Christmann

Area
  - Total: 4.77 km^{2} (1.84 sq mi)
- Elevation: 280 m (920 ft)

Population (2025-12-31)
  - Total: 633
  - Density: 133/km^{2} (344/sq mi)
- Time zone: UTC+01:00 (CET)
  - Summer (DST): UTC+02:00 (CEST)
- Postal codes: 56237
- Dialling codes: 02601
- Vehicle registration: WW
- Website: www.alsbach.de

Alsbach is an Ortsgemeinde – a municipality belonging to a Verbandsgemeinde – in the Westerwaldkreis in Rhineland-Palatinate, Germany.

== Geography ==
The municipality lies in the Westerwald between Koblenz and Siegen. Fifty-four percent of the rural area is wooded. Alsbach belongs to the Verbandsgemeinde of Ransbach-Baumbach, a kind of collective municipality.

== History ==
In 1143, Alsbach had its first documentary mention. From 1806 it belonged to the Duchy of Nassau. In 1866 it passed to Prussia.

== Coat of arms ==
The municipality's arms are based on those formerly borne by the Counts of Wied, Alsbach's former overlords.

== Economy and infrastructure ==
South of Alsbach runs the Autobahn A 48. The nearby Brexbachtalbahn (railway) is no longer in service.
