= Höhr-Grenzhausen =

- Town
- Coat of arms

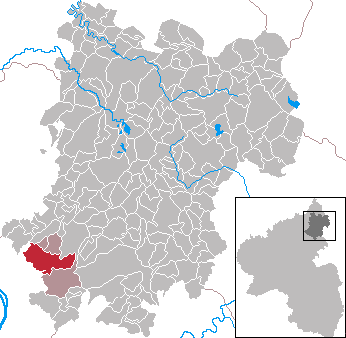
- Location of Höhr-Grenzhausen within Westerwaldkreis district
- Interactive map of Höhr-Grenzhausen
- Location within Germany Location within Rhineland-Palatinate
- Coordinates: 50°26′06″N 7°40′16″E
- Country: Germany
- State: Rhineland-Palatinate
- District: Westerwaldkreis
- Municipal assoc.: Höhr-Grenzhausen

Government
  - Mayor (2019–24): Michael Thiesen

Area
  - Total: 15.88 km^{2} (6.13 sq mi)
- Elevation: 250 m (820 ft)

Population (2025-12-31)
  - Total: 9,354
  - Density: 589.0/km^{2} (1,526/sq mi)
- Time zone: UTC+01:00 (CET)
  - Summer (DST): UTC+02:00 (CEST)
- Postal codes: 56203
- Dialling codes: 02624
- Vehicle registration: WW
- Website: www.hoehr-grenzhausen.de

Höhr-Grenzhausen (German pronunciation: [ˌhøːɐ̯ɡʁɛntsˈhaʊzn̩]) is a town in the Westerwaldkreis in Rhineland-Palatinate, Germany. It is a centre for the ceramic industry in the Kannenbäckerland with a professional college for ceramics, another for ceramic form, and many others, hence the nickname Kannenbäckerstadt (roughly, “Jug Baking Town”).

Together with the communities of Hillscheid, Hilgert and Kammerforst it has formed the Verbandsgemeinde of Höhr-Grenzhausen – a kind of collective municipality – since 1971.

== Geography ==
Höhr-Grenzhausen lies roughly 10 km west of Montabaur, and 10 km northeast of Koblenz.

== Politics ==
=== Town council ===
	CDU	SPD	FWG	FDP	Grüne	Total
2004	10	5	6	1	2	24 seats

(as of municipal election on 13 June 2004)

=== Town partnerships ===
Höhr-Grenzhausen maintains partnerships with these towns:

- Laigueglia, Riviera, Italy (since 1972)
- Semur-en-Auxois, Burgundy, France (since 1987)

== Culture and sightseeing ==
=== Museums ===
In the town are found the Westerwald Ceramics Museum (Keramikmuseum Westerwald) and a museum of the town's history.

=== Buildings ===
- Evangelical church
- Grenzau Castle
- Limes Germanicus, a UNESCO World Heritage site, in particular the Ferbach fort

=== Sport ===
Höhr-Grenzhausen's outlying centre of Grenzau is home to the TTC Zugbrücke Grenzau, a table tennis club involved in Bundesliga play. Likewise, the Rhineland-Palatinate table tennis Olympic base is found here.

== Economy and infrastructure ==
=== Economy ===
RASTAL GmbH & Co. KG, which is a business established in Höhr-Grenzhausen, is one of Europe's biggest manufacturers of decorated drinking vessels, especially beer glasses.

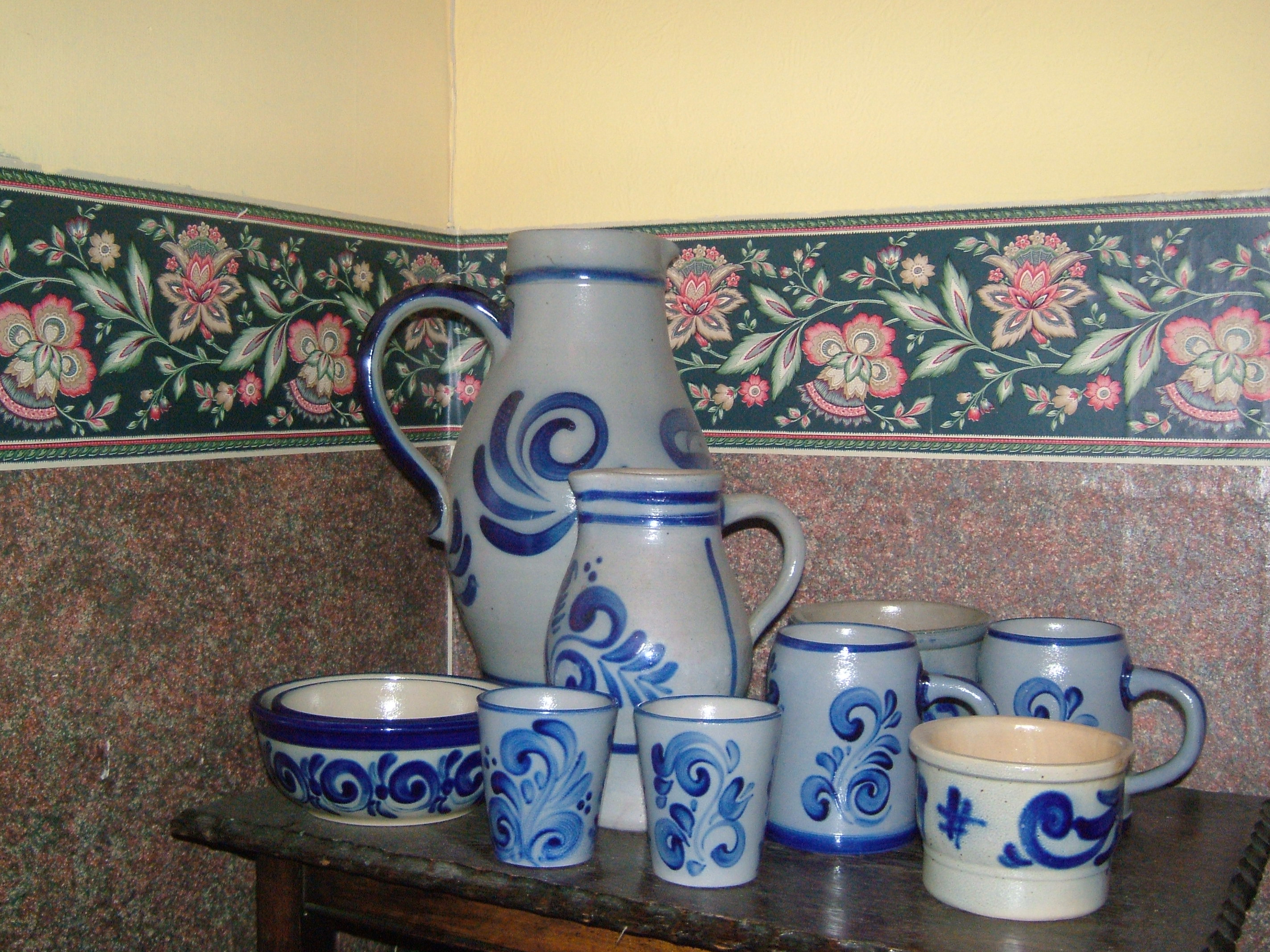
Typical everyday Westerwald pottery

Since the 1500s, the area has been one of the most productive salt-glazed pottery centers in Europe. In the mid 16th century, potters from Raeren in Belgium migrated into the Westerwald, bringing with them some of their moulds. This type of pottery was taken to the New World and was found in the early Chesapeake settlements.

Gray Westerwald pottery is easily recognized with its curling blue flourishes, often in simple floral and leaf patterns. It is still molded by hand and fired in wood-burning kilns throughout the area. The town-wall is decorated all along its full length with huge ceramic pots made by various potters of the area. The International Ceramics Market & Museum Festival is held the first weekend in June, featuring around 150 exhibitors from all over Europe, including Spain, France, Belgium, The Netherlands, Poland and Hungary.

=== Transport ===
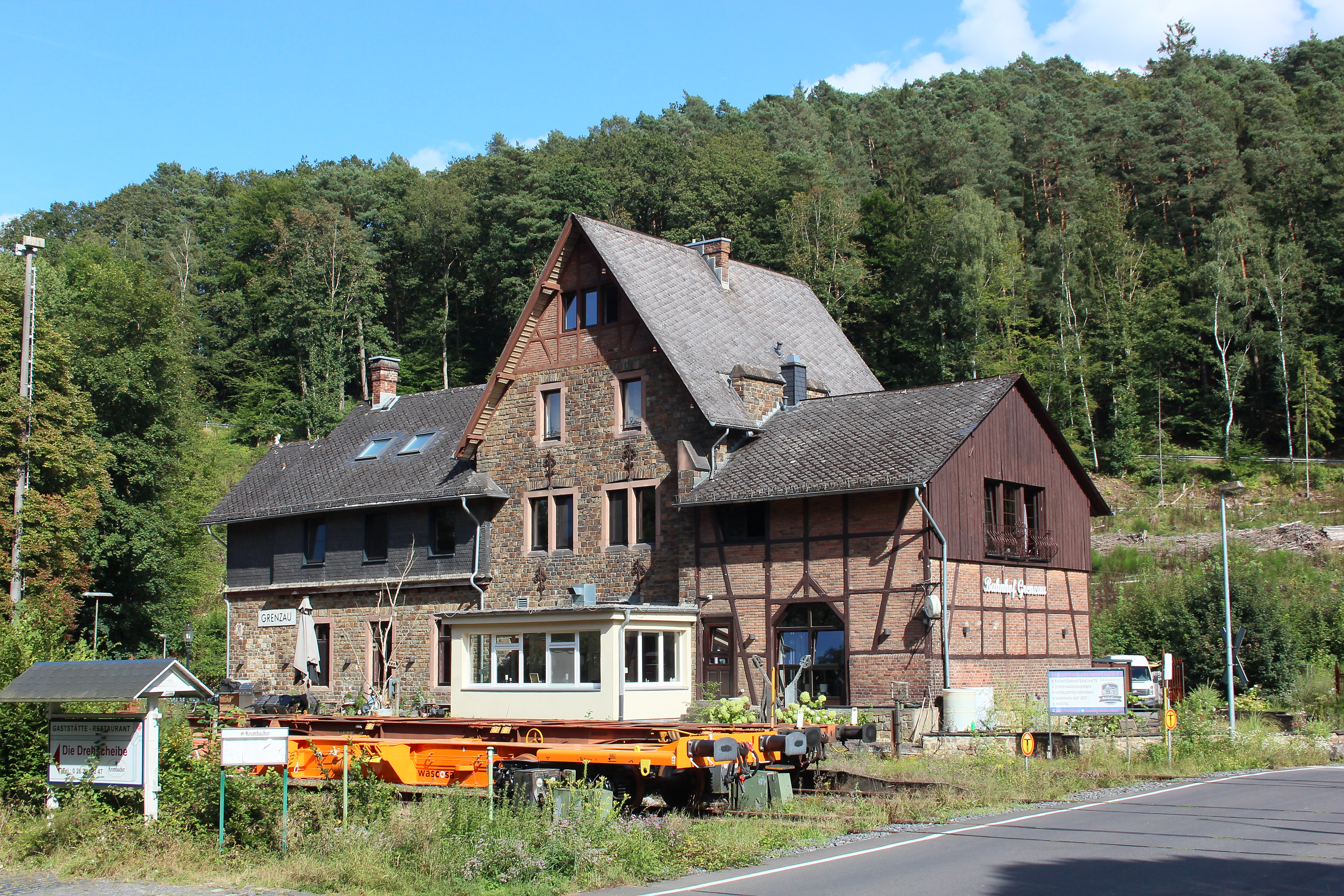
Former train station in Grenzau

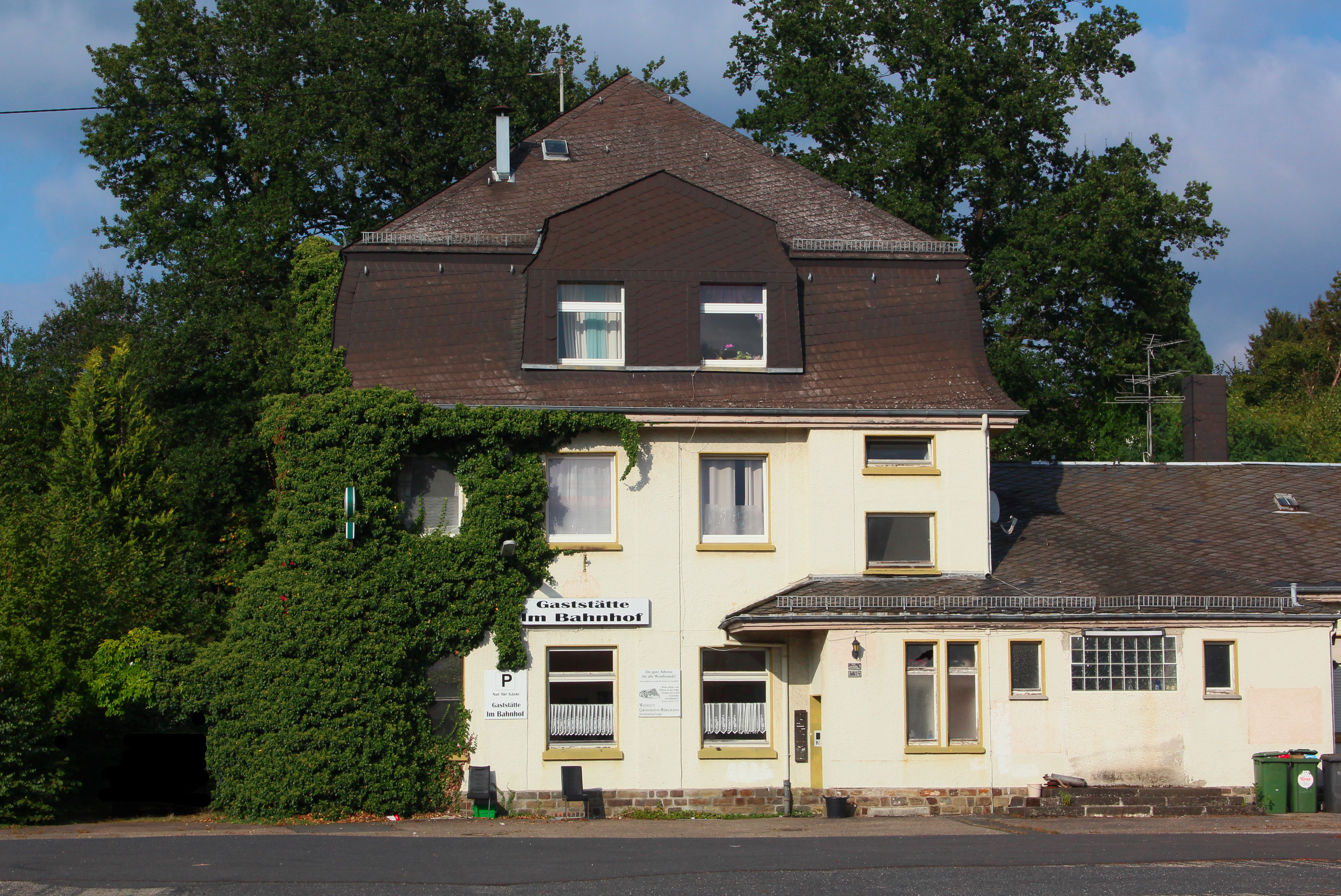
Former Höhr-Grenzhausen train station

There were train stations in Höhr-Grenzhausen center and also in district Grenzau, which is located at the Engers–Au railway, but both are currently out of service.

The town is connected to the public transport through the local bus lines 150, 419, 425, 427, 428, 437, 461, 465, 467 and 968 and located in the area of the transport association Verkehrsverbund Rhein-Mosel (VRM), zone number 416.

== Notable people ==
- Karlheinz Zöller (1928–2005), musician

== See also ==
- German Ceramics Society
- Waechtersbach ceramics
- Darmstadt Artists' Colony
