= Ransbach-Baumbach =

- Town
- Coat of arms

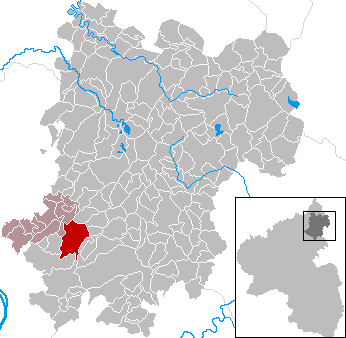
- Location of Ransbach-Baumbach within Westerwaldkreis district
- Interactive map of Ransbach-Baumbach
- Location within Germany Location within Rhineland-Palatinate
- Coordinates: 50°27′58″N 7°43′31″E
- Country: Germany
- State: Rhineland-Palatinate
- District: Westerwaldkreis
- Municipal assoc.: Ransbach-Baumbach
- Subdivisions: 2

Government
  - Mayor (2019–24): Michael Merz (Ind.)

Area
  - Total: 12.15 km^{2} (4.69 sq mi)
- Elevation: 300 m (980 ft)

Population (2025-12-31)
  - Total: 8,178
  - Density: 673.1/km^{2} (1,743/sq mi)
- Time zone: UTC+01:00 (CET)
  - Summer (DST): UTC+02:00 (CEST)
- Postal codes: 56235
- Dialling codes: 02623
- Vehicle registration: WW
- Website: www.ransbach-baumbach.de

Ransbach-Baumbach (German pronunciation: [ˈʁansbax ˈbaʊmbax]) is a town in the Westerwaldkreis in Rhineland-Palatinate, Germany. Ransbach-Baumbach is the seat of the Verbandsgemeinde of Ransbach-Baumbach, a kind of collective municipality.

== Geography ==
The community lies in the Westerwald about 10 km northwest of Montabaur, and 15 km northeast of Koblenz.

== History ==
In 1330, the parish of Ransbach had its first documentary mention. Already in 959, however, the Montabaurer Zehntbeschreibung (a “description of tithes”), speaks of the vanished community of Desper (Dedinsburg) near Ransbach. In 1373, the name Babenbach for Baumbach crops up. In 1969, Ransbach and Baumbach were merged into one community. In 1971, in the course of municipal restructuring, the Verbandsgemeinde of Ransbach-Baumbach was founded. In 1975, Ransbach-Baumbach was granted town rights.

== Partnerships ==
- Pleurtuit, Brittany, France since 1985
- Parish of Rukoma in Mirenge, Rwanda since April 2005

== Schools and kindergartens ==
- Astrid Lindgren-Schule (primary school/whole-day school)
- Erich Kästner-Schule (Regionalschule)
- St. Markus Catholic Kindergarten
- St. Antonius Catholic Kindergarten
- St. Martin Town Kindergarten

== Sightseeing ==
Ransbach-Baumbach lies in the heart of the Kannenbäckerland, a small region known for its ceramics industry.

- Many pottery works in and around Ransbach-Baumbach
- 40-m-high lookout tower on the Köppel
- Yearly pottery market on the first weekend in October
- Erlenhofsee (lake)

== Transport ==
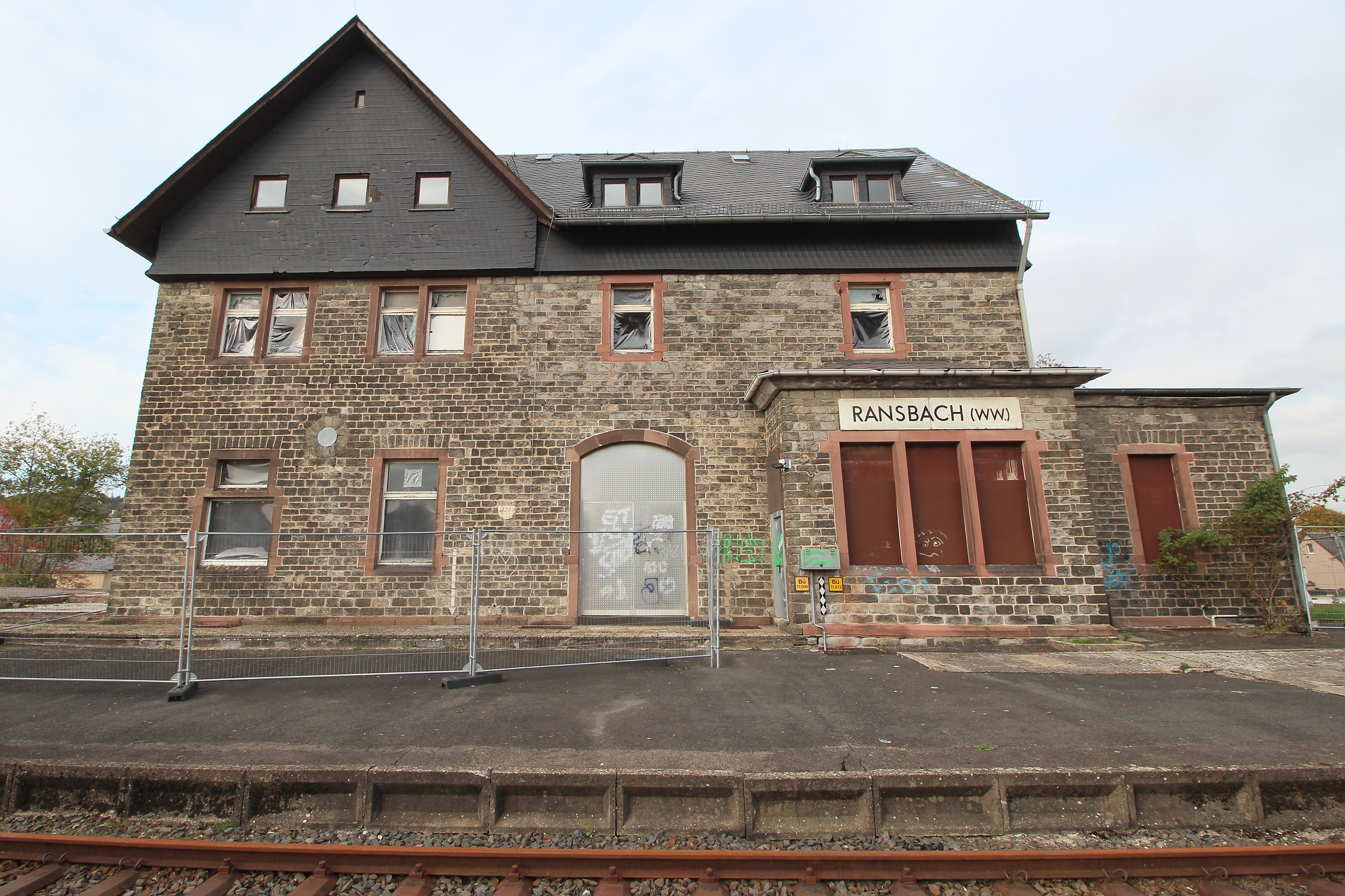
Former Ransbachb(Ww) train station

The district Ransbach was located on the Engers-Au railway, the section between Engers and Siershahn is currently out of service.

Ransbach-Baumbach is served by the local bus lines 425, 427, 461, 467, 485 and 964 and located in the area of the transport association Verkehrsverbund Rhein-Mosel (VRM), fare zone 415.

== Other ==
Since 1676 the Fohr Brewery has been in Ransbach-Baumbach.
