= Köppel (Westerwald) =

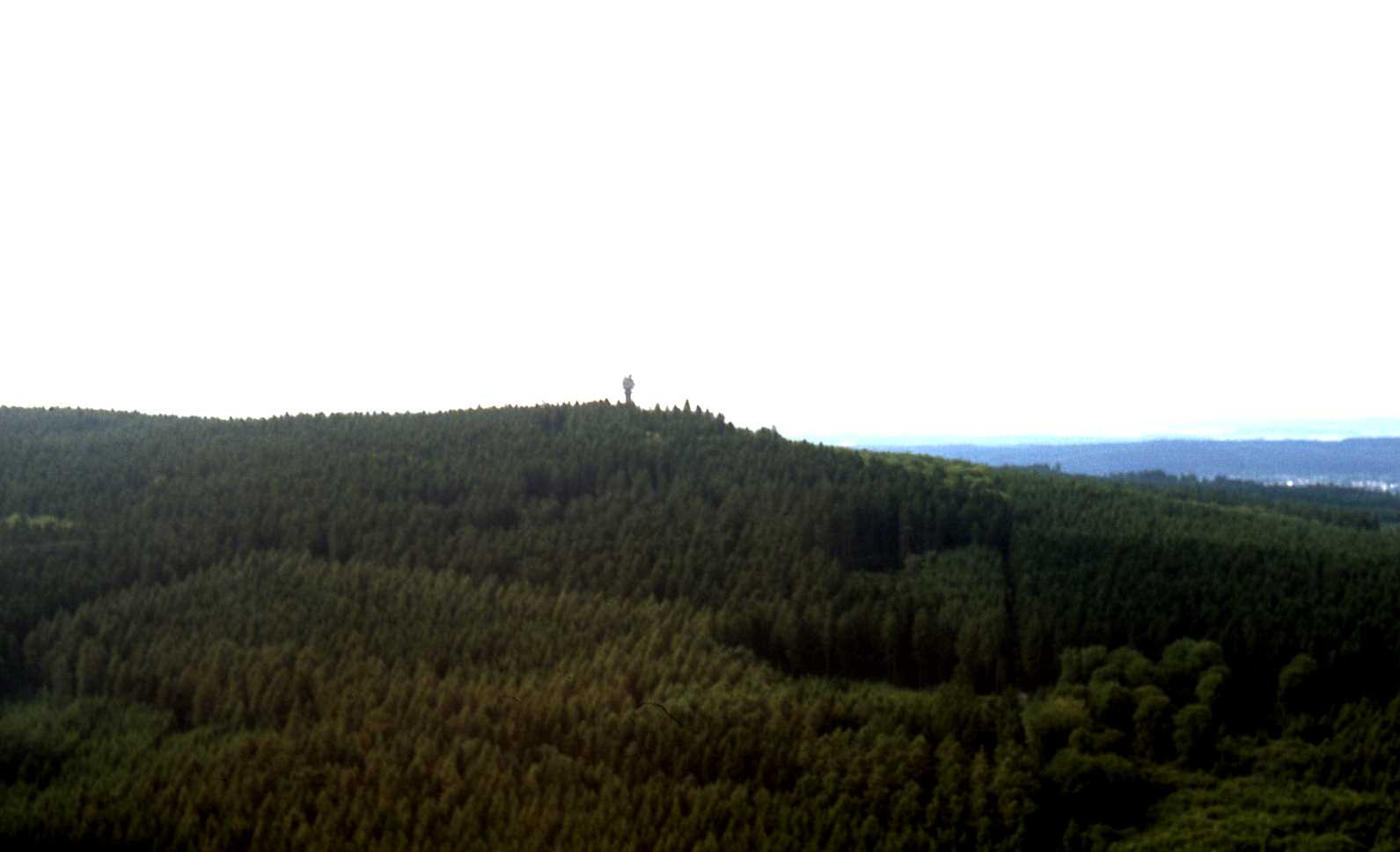
- The Köppel and its viewing tower

Highest point
- Elevation: 540.2 m above sea level (NHN) (1,772 ft)
- Listing: Köppel viewing tower
- Coordinates: 50°25′49.3″N 7°45′3.4″E

Geography
- Location within Rhineland-Palatinate
- Location: Near Dernbach and Montabaur; Westerwaldkreis, Rhineland-Palatinate, Germany
- Parent range: Montabaur Heights, Westerwald

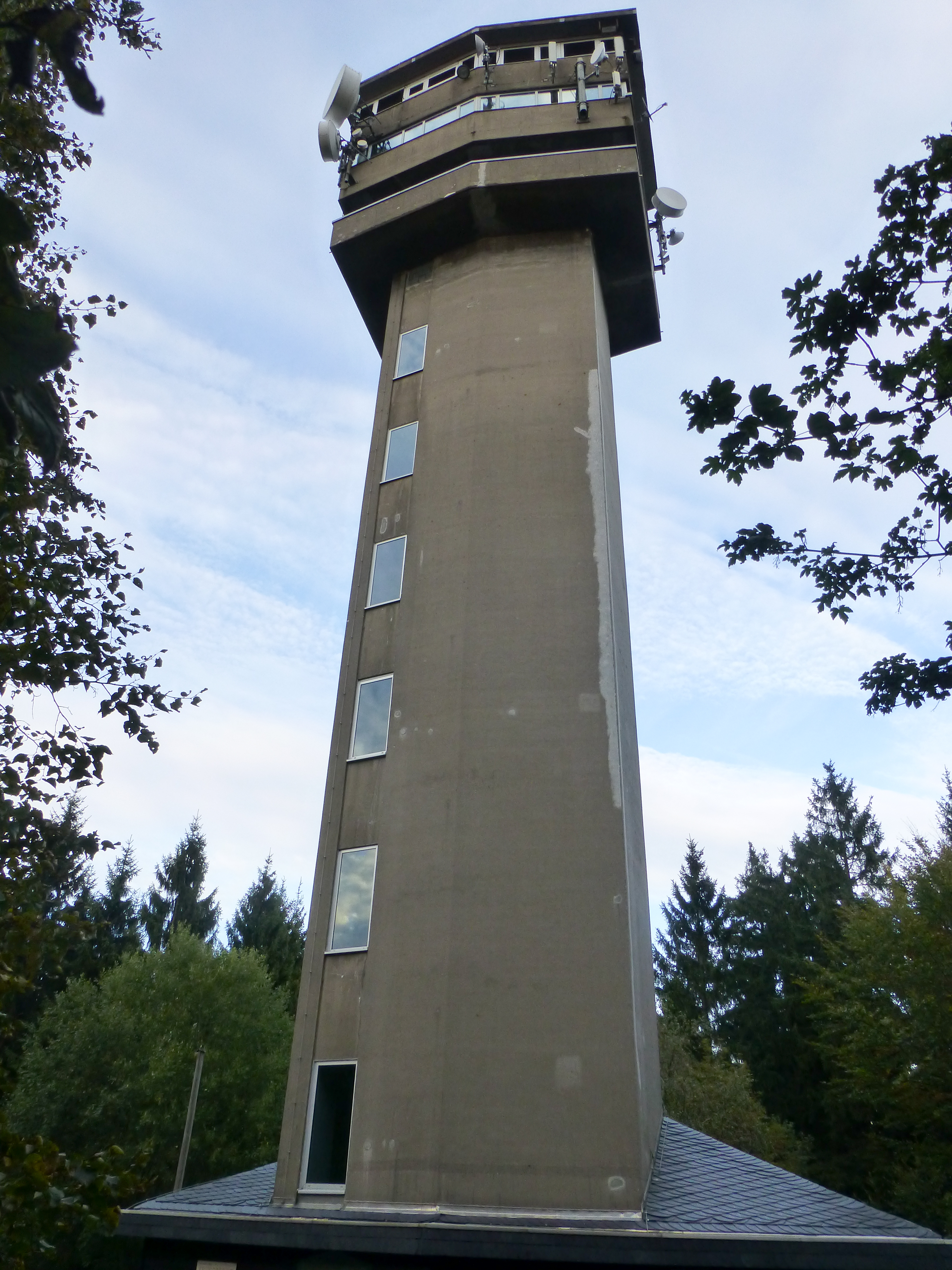
The viewing tower on the Köppel

The Köppel, at 540.2 m above sea level (NHN), is the second highest point in the Montabaur Heights, an elongated hill ridge in the Lower Westerwald in Germany. It is second only to the nearby Alarmstange (545.2 m) and lies on the boundary between Montabaur and Dernbach in the county of Westerwaldkreis in the state of Rhineland-Palatinate. At the summit is the Köppel viewing tower.

== Name ==
In the Westerwald dialect Köppel is the general name for a hill or mountain, possibly related to the Alemannic word Kapf meaning a mountain or hill with a good view. It probably goes back to the original Frankish term for high points in the terrain and means "small head".

== Geography ==
=== Location ===
The Köppel is located within the Nassau Nature Park. Its summit is on the boundary between the parish of Dernbach, whose village is 4 km to the northeast, and the borough of Montabaur, whose town is 5.7 km to the east. The majority of the summit region is on the Dernbach side. To the west-southwest, the terrain transitions to the hill of Alarmstange, 1.5 km away.

On the north flank of the hill rises the Masselbach; on the northeast side, the Schabebornbach and Waldbach. The Biebrichsbach, a headstream of the Stadtbach which rises on the Alarmstange, flows past to the south. The headstreams of the Brexbach, the Vorderste Bach and Hinterste Bach, rise to the west-northwest and northwest of the summit.

=== Natural regions ===
The Köppel is located within the natural region major unit group of the Westerwald (no. 32), the major unit of the Lower Westerwald (324) and the subunit of the Montabaur Heights (324.1).

== Conservation ==
The Köppel is covered by beech, mixed forest and conifers. Part of the Montabaur Heights Special Area of Conservation lies on the mountain (no. 5512-301; 28.11 km^{2}).

== Köppel viewing tower ==
On the summit region of the Köppel in the parish of Dernbach is the Köppel viewing tower which was built from 1964 to 1966 from reinforced concrete and which is 37.48 m high. It has a covered viewing platform 28.8 metres above the ground offering views over the Westerwald and the volcanoes in the Pellenz and as far as the Eifel, Taunus and Hunsrück. It has transmitters for the D2 mobile network. In the vicinity of the tower is a restaurant.
