= Alarmstange =

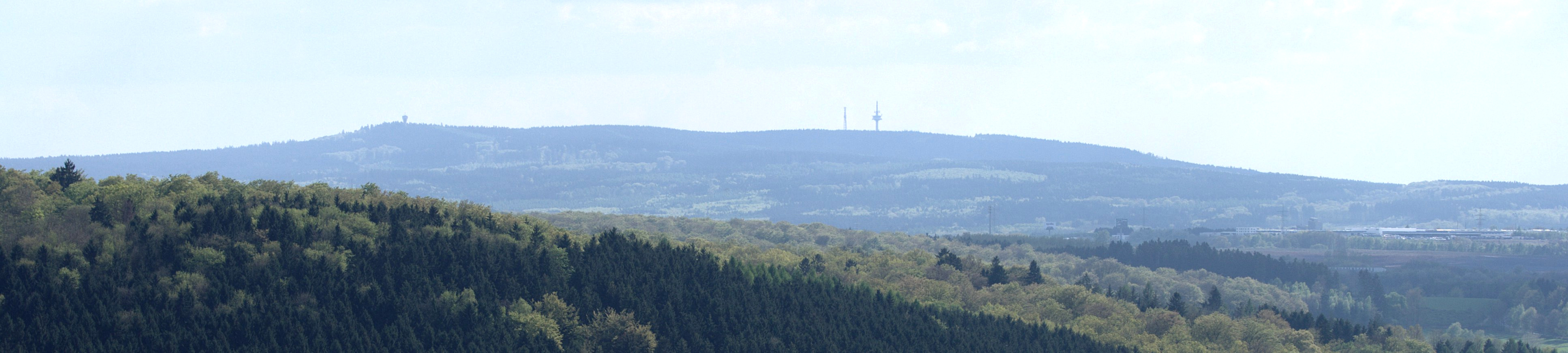
- View from Quirnbach looking SSW towards the Montabaur Heights with the summits of the Köppel (l) and Alarmstange (r)

Highest point
- Elevation: 545.2 m above sea level (NHN) (1,789 ft)
- Listing: Two telecommunication towers
- Coordinates: 50°25′29.9″N 7°44′2″E

Geography
- Location within Rhineland-Palatinate
- Location: Near Horressen; Westerwaldkreis, Rhineland-Palatinate, Germany
- Parent range: Westerwald

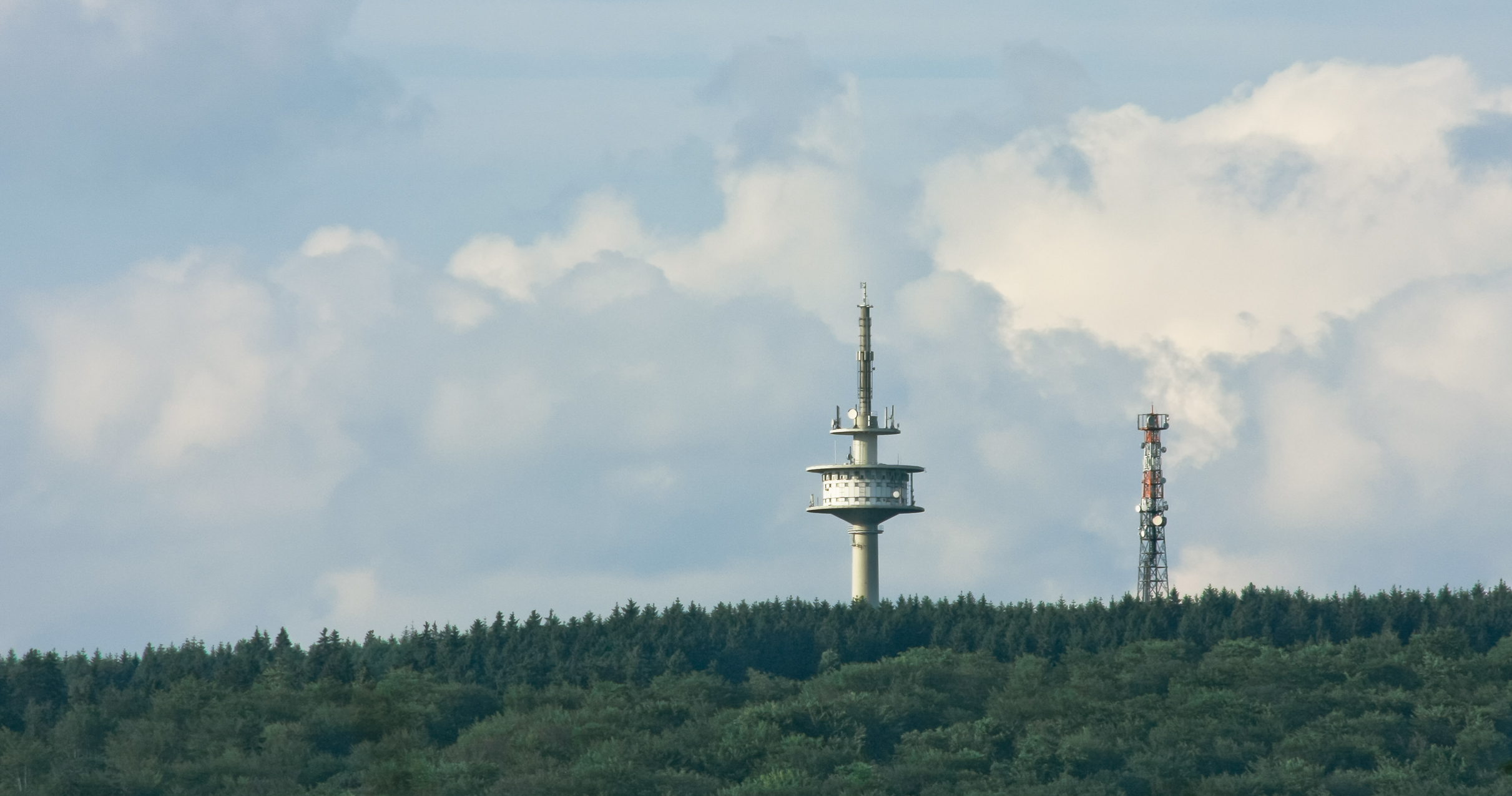
Telecommunication towers on the Alarmstange

The Alarmstange, at 545.2 m above sea level (NHN), is the highest point in the Montabaur Heights, a hill ride on the southwestern edge of the Westerwald. It lies near Horressen in the county of Westerwaldkreis in the German state of Rhineland-Palatinate. Together with the Köppel and the Lippersberg, the Alarmstange forms the centre of the ridge, on which is the largest contiguous woodland area in the Westerwald.

== Name ==
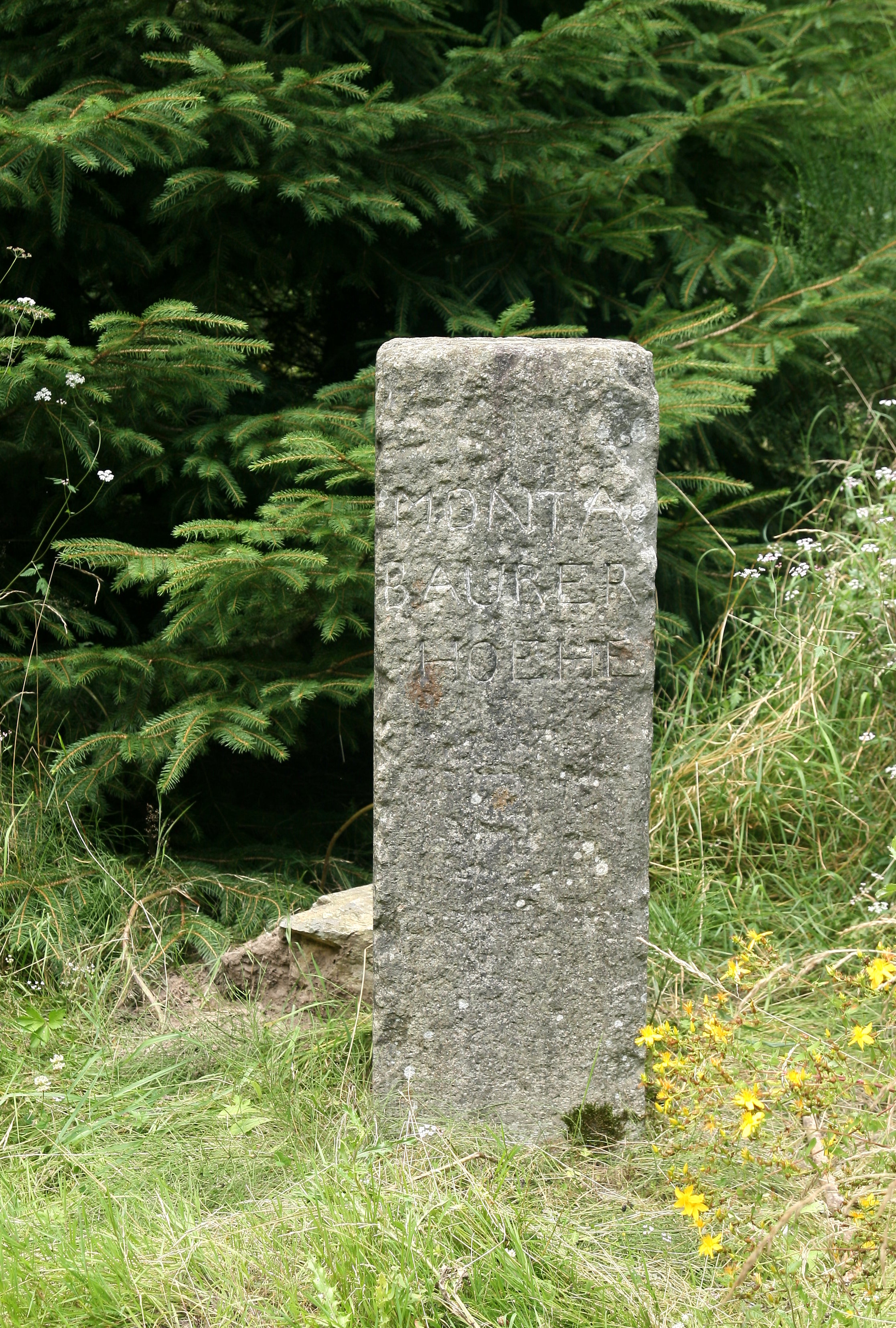
Historical trigonometric point

The Alarmstange owes its name to the fact that in 1809 French soldiers built an optical signal station there. In 1853, a post was erected that acted as a trigonometric point for the surveying of the Rhineland which was begun by Jean-Joseph Tranchot and continued by Friedrich Carl Ferdinand von Müffling. From 1894 it was used for the Prussian state survey. The post was moved in 1969 by around five metres and, in its place, a granite post was erected.

== Geography ==
=== Location ===
The Alarmstange stands within the Nassau Nature Park. The boundary of the borough of Montabaur, whose town lies 7 km ENE of the summit, with the municipality of Hillscheid, whose village is 3.5 km SW, runs from northwest via west to southwest around the summit region which belongs to the borough of Montabaur. To the east-northeast the countryside transitions to the Köppel, which is around 1.5 km away. Two streams rise on the hill's north flank, the Vorderste Bach and the Hinterste Bach, both headstreams of the Brexbach. On the southern slopes is the source of the Biebrichsbach, a headstream of the Stadtbach. To the south the Wolfsborn is the sources of the little Wolfsgraben, which discharges into the Kalterbach, as does the little Alsbach, which rises to the southwest. On the western hillside is the source of the Feisternachtbach (Kühlbach).

On the summit region and southern flank of the Alarmstange are parts of a Special Area of Conservation, the Montabauer Heights (Montabaurer Höhe, FFH no. 5512-301; 28.11 km^{2}).

=== Natural regions ===
The Alarmstange lies within the natural region major unit group of the Westerwald (no. 32), in the major of the Lower Westerwald (324) and in the subunit of the Montabaur Heights (324.1).

=== Height ===
The Alarmstange is 545.2 m. Roughly 150 metres southwest of the summit on topographical maps is a spot height of 542.5 m. Atlases and larger maps give its height as 545 m or 546 m.

== Telecommunication towers and survey station ==
About 130 metres southwest of the summit of the Alarmstange stands the99-metre-high Hillscheid-Alarmstange Tower built in 1971 (50°25′27.8″N 7°43′55.5″E) belonging to Deutsche Funkturm with its amateur radio relay repeater. 150 metres west of this tower is the air quality survey station of Neuhäusel, which is part of the ZIMEN network of the State Office for the Environment, Water and Trade. About 20 metres west of the summit is another telecommunication tower.

== Transport and hiking ==
The Landesstraße 309 and German Limes Road run over the southern slopes of the Montabaur Heights and the Alarmstange between Hillscheid and the Bundesstraße 49, roughly from west to east. it runs near the Wolfsgraben at about 420 m and meets the B 49 at 424.3 m.

The E1 European long distance path runs over the Montabaur Heights and the Köppel east of the Alarmstange. On the western hillside of the Alarmstange, next to a forest track and hiking trail fork (499.2 m) is the refuge hut of Thielshütte built in 1967.
