= Kalterbach =

Kalterbach may refer to:

- Kalterbach (Amper), a river of Bavaria, Germany, tributary of the Amper
- Kalterbach, a river in central Germany that drains the Bückeberg and feeds the Aue
- Kalterbach, a river at the hill Alarmstange in Rhineland-Palatinate, Germany
- Kalterbach, also called Kalbach, a river of Rhineland-Palatinate, Germany, tributary of the Lahn
