= Sayn (disambiguation) =

Sayn was a small German county of the Holy Roman Empire which, during the Middle Ages, existed within what is today Rheinland-Pfalz in Germany.

Sayn may also refer to:

- Sayn, village in the borough of Bendorf in the county of Mayen-Koblenz, Rhineland-Palatinate, Germany
- Sayn Castle in Sayn
- Sayn (river), a right tributary of the River Rhine
- Sayn-Wittgenstein, German noble family
- Sayn-Wittgenstein-Sayn, branch of the German noble family
