= Kœur-la-Petite =

Koeur-la-Petite
- Commune
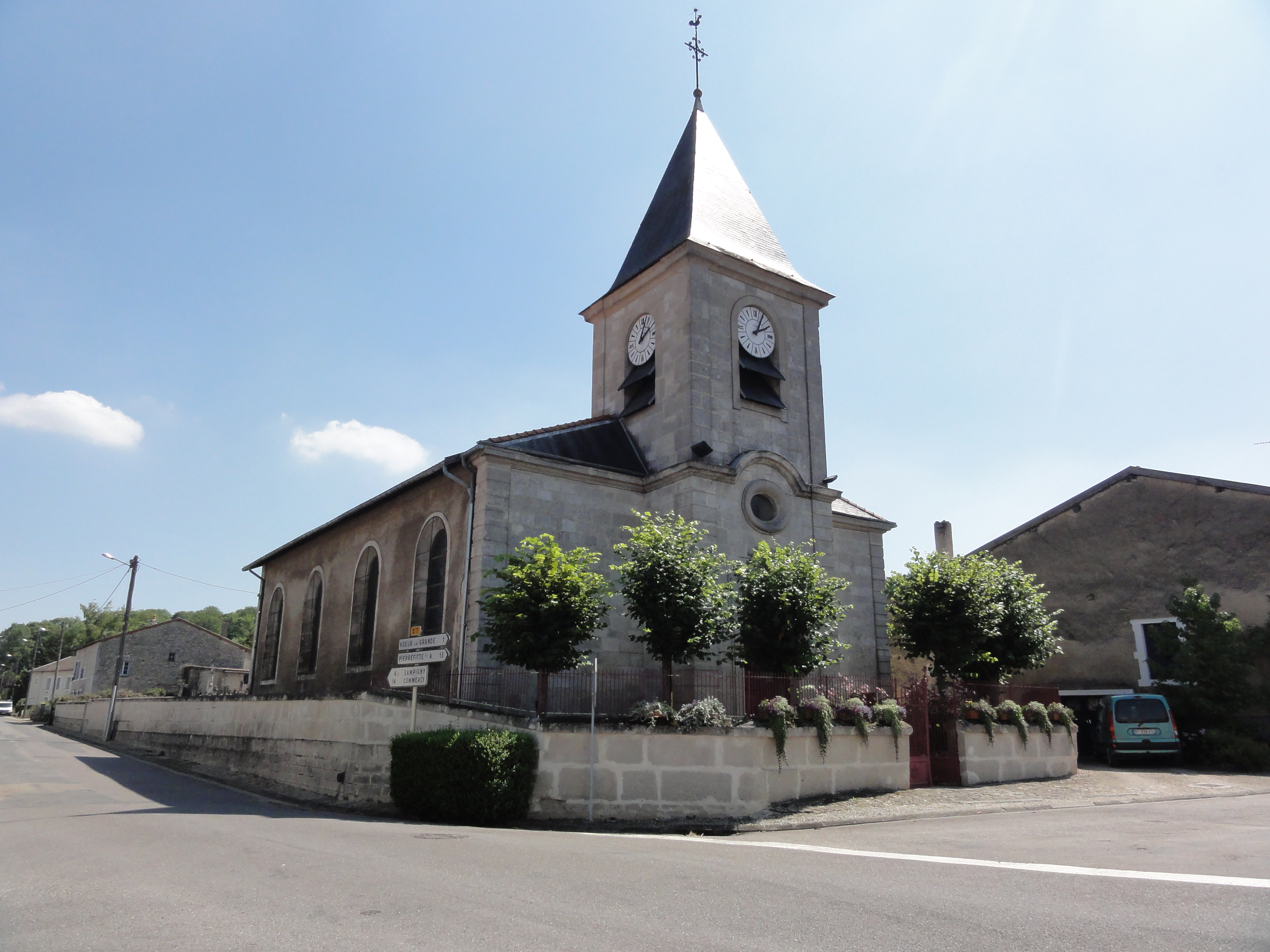
- The church in Kœur-la-Petite

- Coat of arms
- Location of Koeur-la-Petite
- Location within France Location within Grand Est
- Coordinates: 48°51′20″N 5°29′45″E
- Country: France
- Region: Grand Est
- Department: Meuse
- Arrondissement: Commercy
- Canton: Dieue-sur-Meuse
- Intercommunality: Sammiellois

Government
  - Mayor (2020–2026): Éric Gilson
- Area^{1}: 20.33 km^{2} (7.85 sq mi)
- Elevation: 222 m (728 ft)
- Highest elevation: 361 m (1,184 ft)
- Lowest elevation: 217 m (712 ft)
- Population (2023): 256
  - Density: 12.6/km^{2} (32.6/sq mi)
- Time zone: UTC+01:00 (CET)
  - Summer (DST): UTC+02:00 (CEST)
- INSEE/Postal code: 55264 /55300
- ^{1} French Land Register data, which excludes lakes, ponds, glaciers > 1 km^{2} (0.386 sq mi or 247 acres) and river estuaries.

Kœur-la-Petite (French pronunciation: [kœʁ la pətit]) is a commune in the Meuse department in Grand Est in north-eastern France.

In 1463, during the Wars of the Roses, Kœur became a refuge for members of the defeated House of Lancaster. Henry VI of England's wife, Margaret of Anjou found shelter and lived there with her son Edward of Westminster, Prince of Wales, and John Fortescue.

== Notable people ==
- Jean-Joseph Tranchot (1752 – 1815): French military cartographer

== See also ==
- Communes of the Meuse department
