= Kalterbach (Amper) =

River in Germany

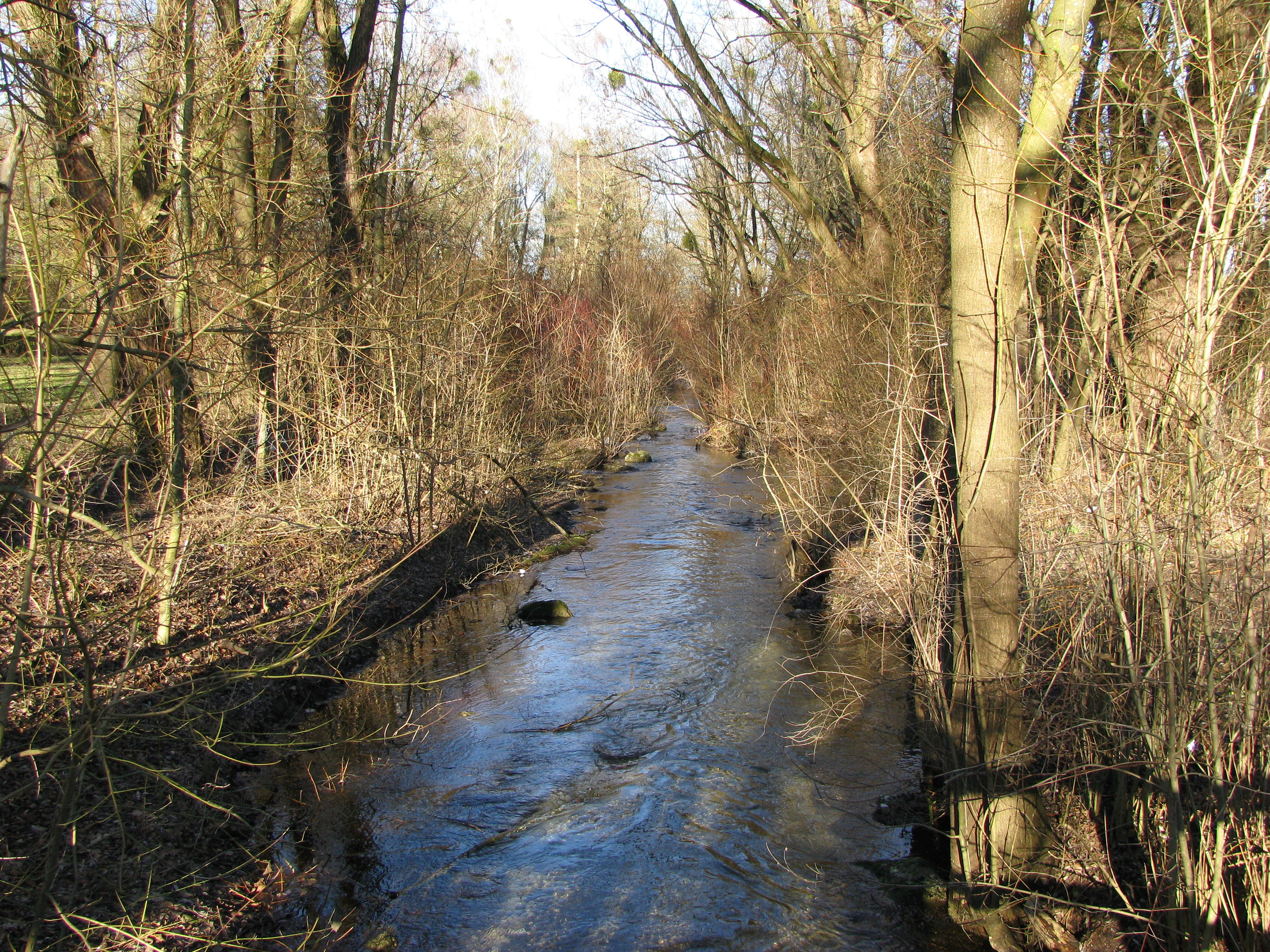
- The Kalterbach shortly after its origin in the lake Feldmochinger See

Location
- Country: Germany
- State: Bavaria

Physical characteristics
- Mouth
  - location: Amper
  - coordinates: 48.3018°N 11.5034°E
- Length: 11.3 km (7.0 mi)

Basin features
- Progression: Amper→ Isar→ Danube→ Black Sea

Kalterbach (in its upper course: Würmhölzlgraben) is a river of Bavaria, Germany. It is an outlet of the lake Feldmochinger See and a right tributary of the Amper at Ampermoching (part of Hebertshausen).

== See also ==
- List of rivers of Bavaria
