= Sayn Castle =

Castle ruins in Bendorf, Germany

- Burg Sayn, Alte Burg, Burg Stein, Eselsburg
- Bendorf
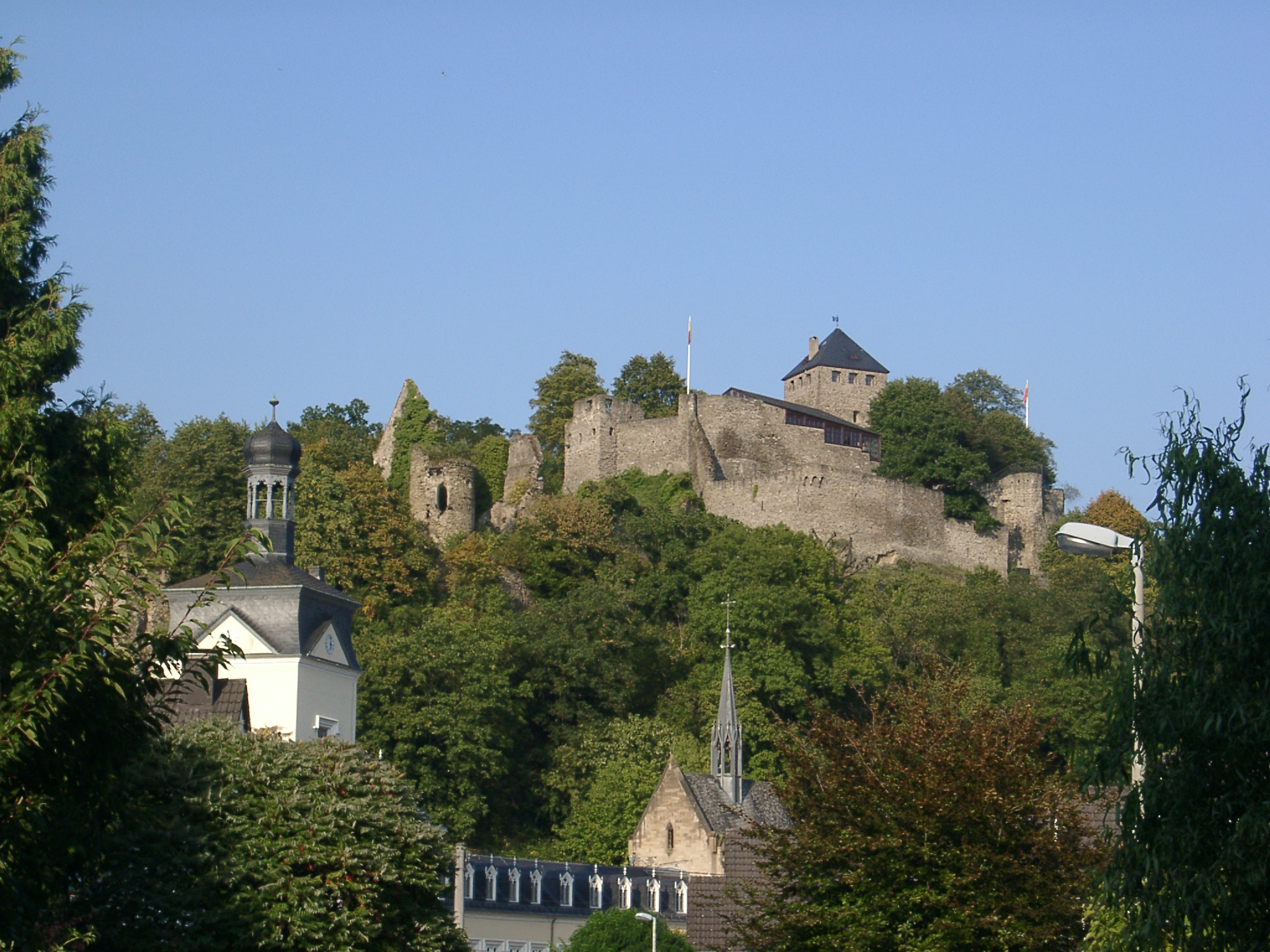
- Sayn and castle ruins

Site information
- Type: hill castle, spur castle
- Code: DE-RP
- Condition: ruins

Location
- Coordinates: 50°26′20″N 7°34′45″E
- Height: 110 m above sea level (NN)

Site history
- Built: from 1152, first recorded around 1400
- Materials: Quader, Bruchstein

Garrison information
- Occupants: counts

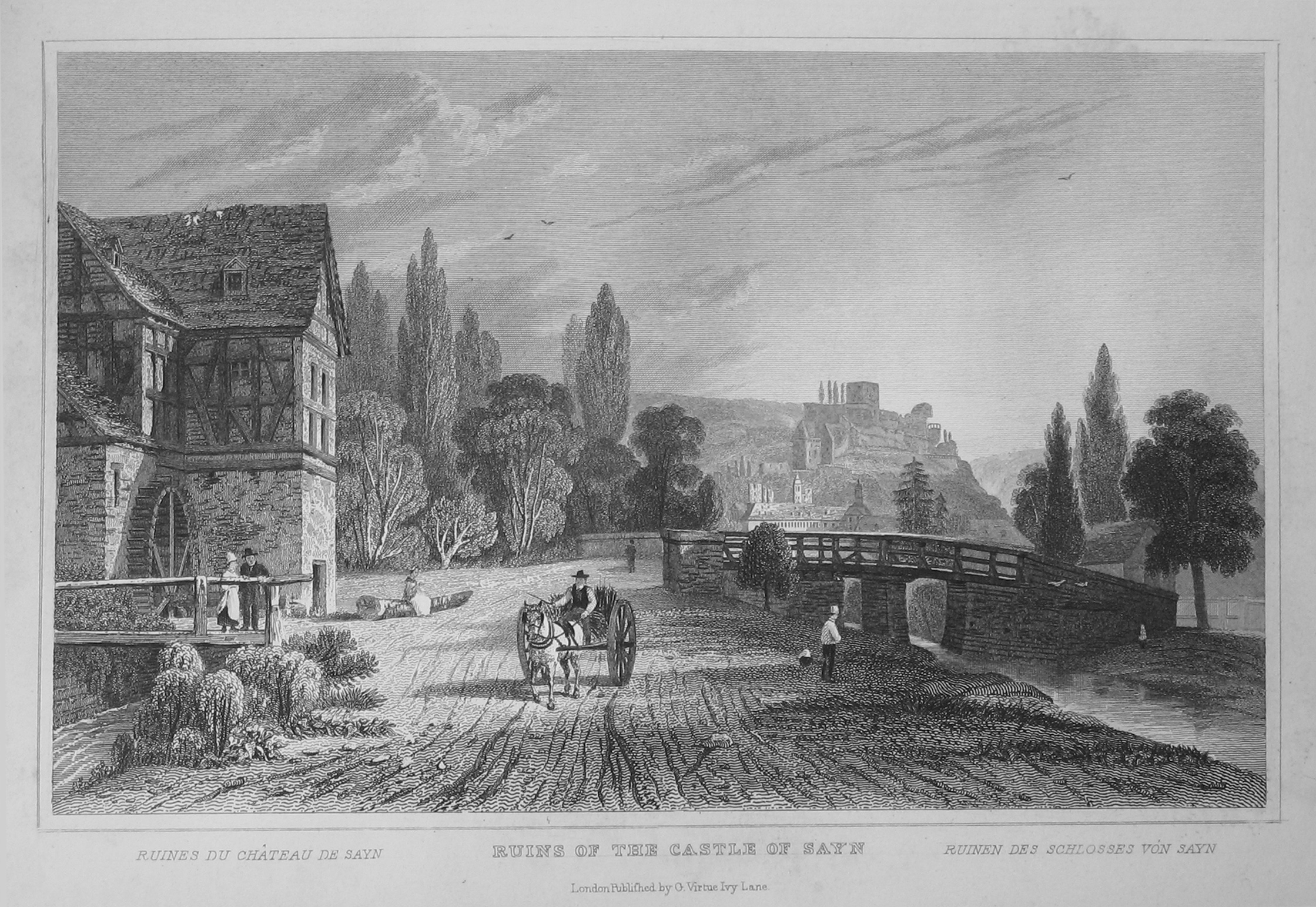
Ruins of Sayn Castle around 1832, drawing by Tombleson

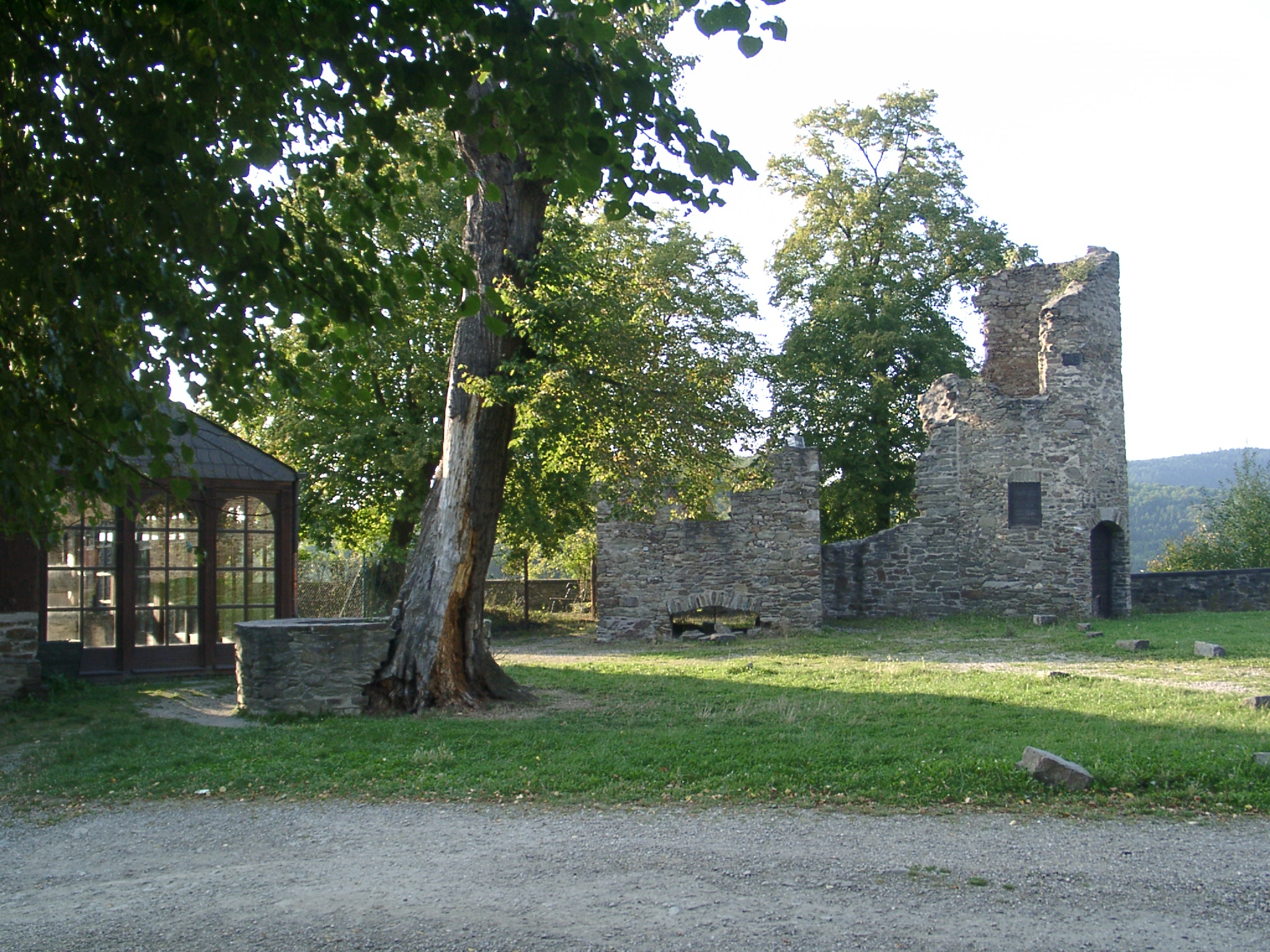
Ruins of Sayn Castle

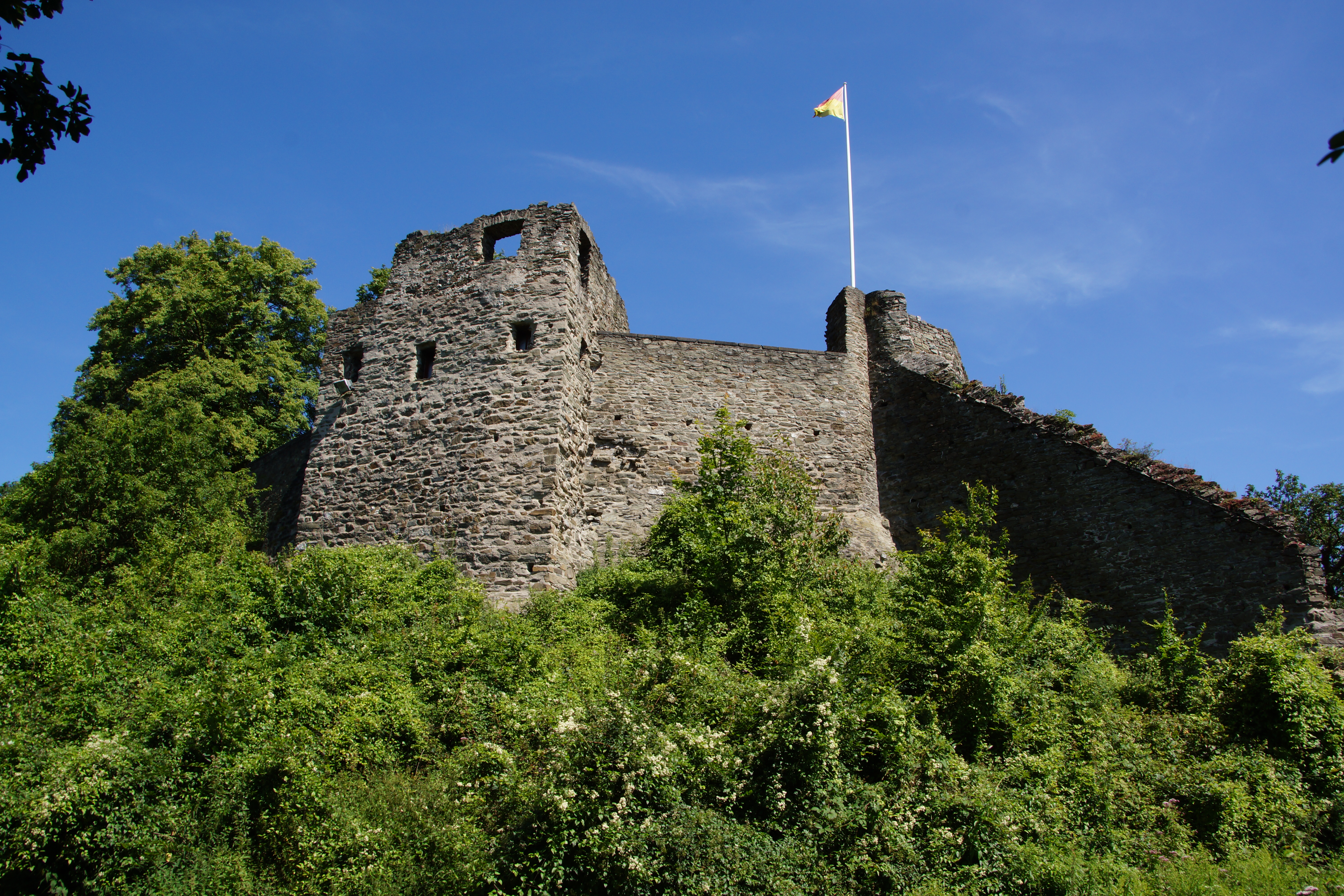
Ruins of Sayn Castle

The ruins of Sayn Castle (German: Burg Sayn), the 12th century family castle of the counts of Sayn and Sayn-Wittgenstein, are in Sayn, part of the borough of Bendorf on the Rhine, between Koblenz and Neuwied in the county of Mayen-Koblenz in the German state of Rhineland-Palatinate.

== Location ==
The ruins of the spur castle lie on the Kehrberg, a hill ridge about 110 metres long and 40 metres wide, in the foothills of the Westerwald, between the valleys of the Brexbach and Saynbach. Below the ruins, the village of Sayn stretches away to the south. At the foot of the castle hill is Schloss Sayn, a Baroque building dating to 1757.

Between the schloss and Sayn Castle there are two former castellan residences: the 15th century Mittlere Burghaus, which is joined to the castle by a wall, and the 14th century Von Steinschen Sitz (Stein Castle) of the lords of Stein from Nassau. Further east along the ridge there is the predecessor of Sayn Castle, the Alte Burg (“Old Castle”) from the 10th or 11th century, of which only a few remnants have survived.

Sayn Castle may be reached on the B 413 federal highway and Landesstraße L 306 which branches off in Sayn. At the castle is a large car park and another one just in front of the castle wall.

== Description ==
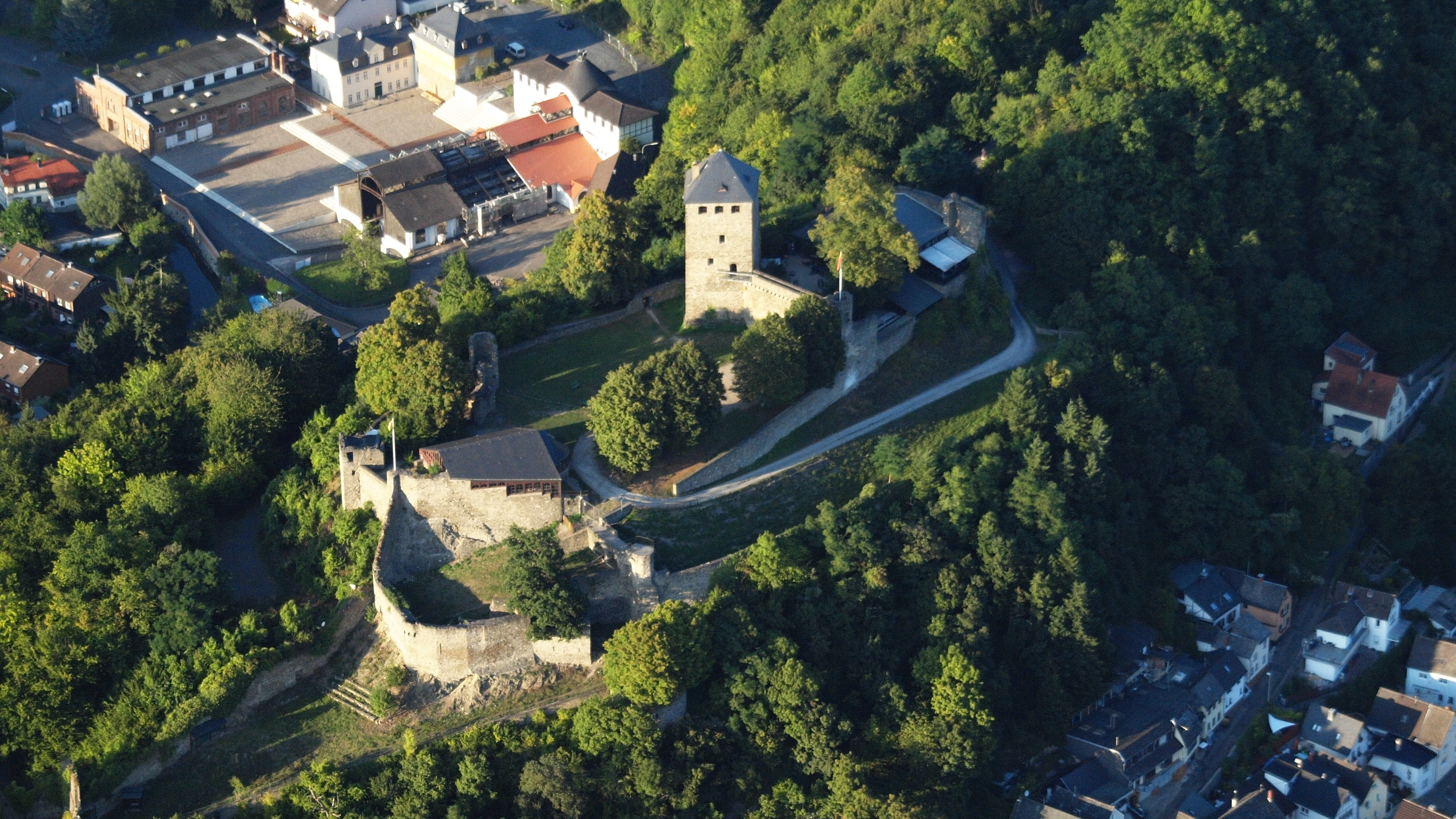
Sayn Castle, aerial view in 2013

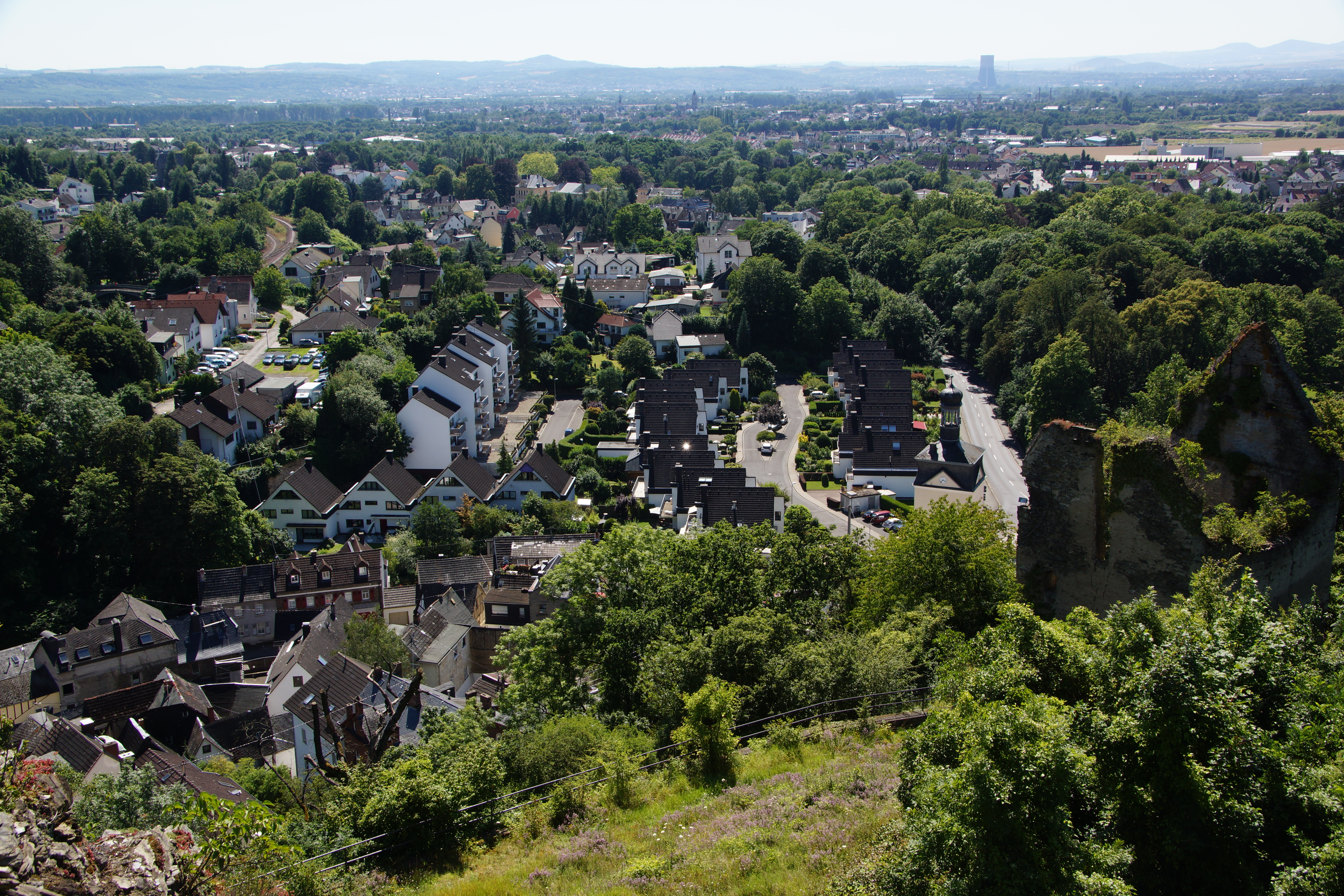
View of Sayn Castle

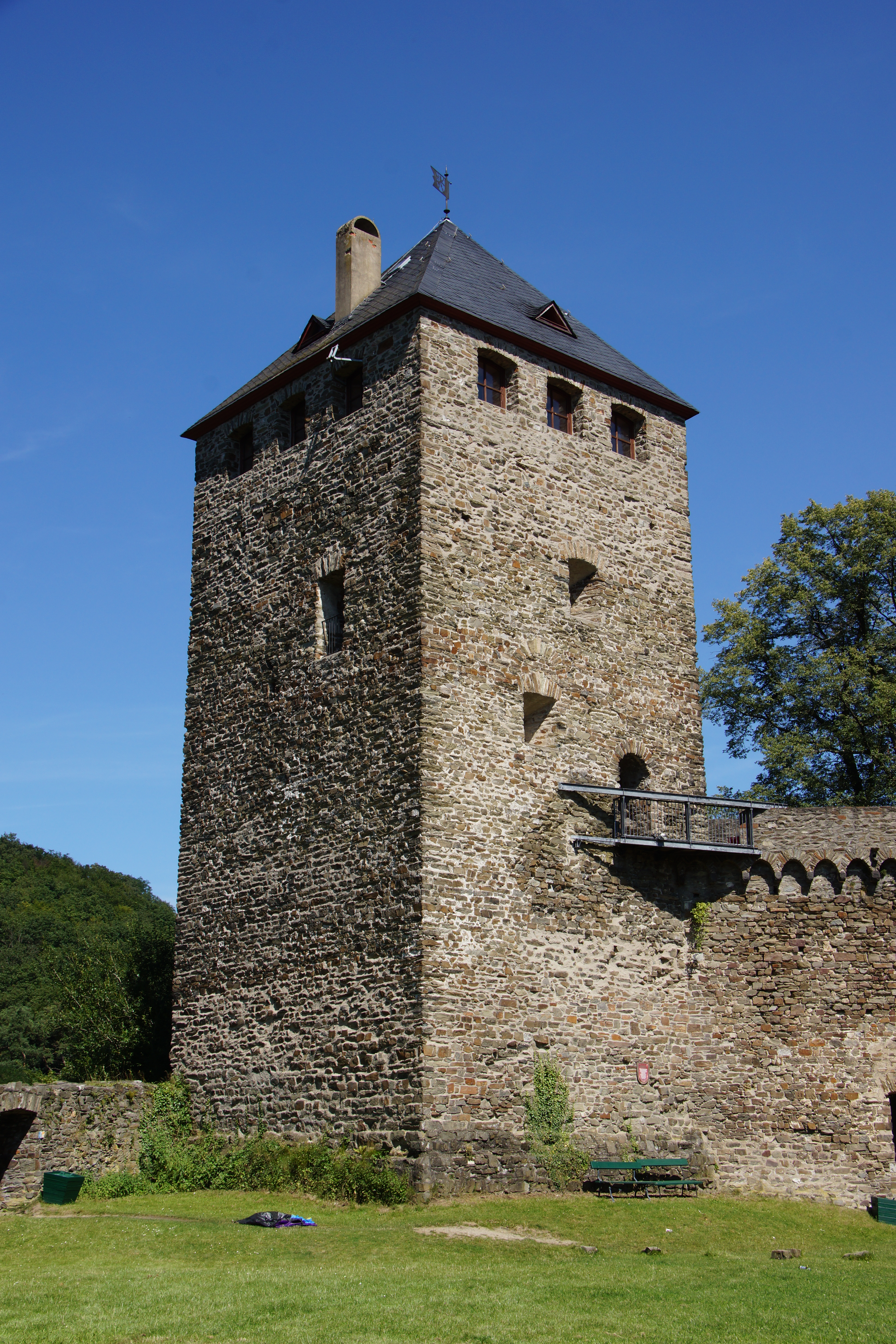
The bergfried

Whilst the southern, western and northern flanks of Sayn drop steeply into the valley, the flat hill ridge on the eastern side, from where the castle is accessed, is protected by a deep and wide artificial neck ditch. In order to provide additional protection a mighty shield wall with a wall walk was built above the moat. In the northeastern area of the site stands a well preserved, roughly 20-metre-high bergfried, which dominates the appearance of Sayn Castle. The construction period of the bergfried, whose walls are 2.4 metres thick in the middle, dates to the late 12th century. A wall running south from the bergfried, also guarded by an allure, divides the inner bailey into two courtyards.

Excavations in recent times have revealed that the palas originally stood on the south side of the smaller eastern courtyard, but was later moved to the western spur of the site. Today nothing is left apart from a 25-metre-deep castle well and an octagonal staircase tower. These excavations also uncovered the foundation walls of a castle chapel at the southwestern corner in the form of a simultaneum with three apses and its well preserved, ornately decorated floor dating to about 1200.

In front of the southern enceinte is a 90-metre-long and 20-metre-wide zwinger, guarded to the east by a small defensive tower and to the west by a barbican. Here there is also a smaller gateway zwinger and, further down the hillside, the Mittlere Burghaus ("Middle Castle House"), which is joined to the inner ward by a wall. The excavations, carried out by the State Conservation Department, also exposed the original access track to the inner ward along the southern flank through the gate zwinger, which may now be used again.

== Literature ==
- Dehio: Rhineland-Palatinate, Saarland. Munich, 1984, pp. 92–93
- Udo Liessem: Zur Baugeschichte von Sayn Castle. In: Alexander Fürst zu Sayn-Wittgenstein-Sayn (ed.): Sayn - Ort and Fürstenhaus. o.O., o.J. (Bendorf-Sayn, 1979)
- Alexander Thon, Stefan Ulrich: „... wie ein Monarch mitten in seinem Hofstaate thront“. Burgen am unteren Mittelrhein. Schnell & Steiner, Regensburg, 2010, ISBN 978-3-7954-2210-3, pp. 142–147.
