= Brexbach =

River in Germany

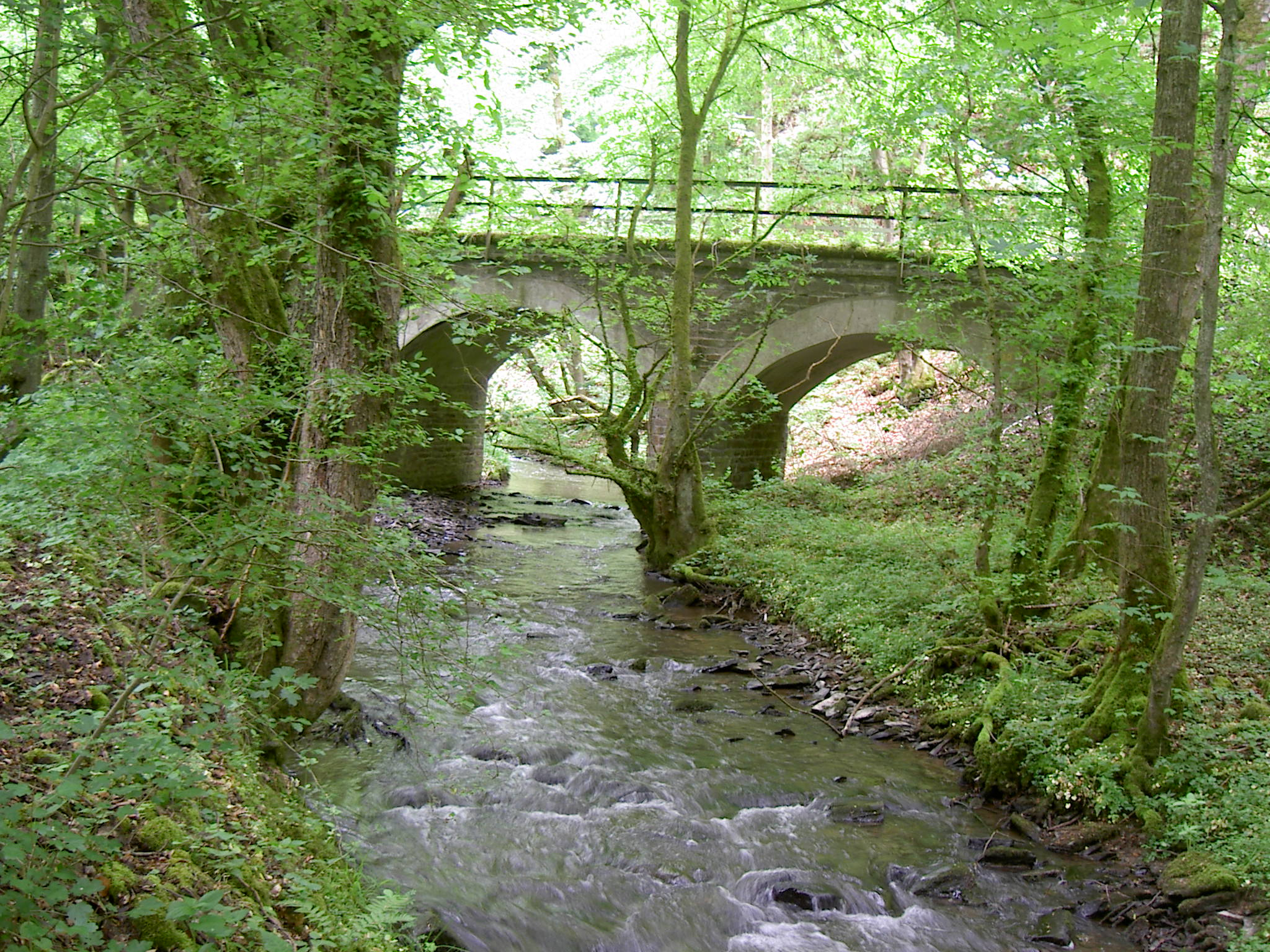
- The Brexbach between Grenzau and Bendorf-Sayn/Pfadfinderlager

Location
- Country: Germany
- State: Rhineland-Palatinate
- Reference no.: DE: 27128

Physical characteristics
- Source
  - location: in the Westerwald east of Höhr-Grenzhausen as the Hinterster Bach
  - coordinates: 50°26′5.18″N 7°44′18.08″E
  - elevation: c. 451 m above sea level (NHN)
- Mouth
  - location: in Bendorf-Sayn into the Saynbach
  - coordinates: 50°26′13.56″N 7°34′18.26″E
  - elevation: ca. 73 m above sea level (NHN)
- Length: 21.74 km (13.51 mi)
- Basin size: 53.476 km^{2} (20.647 sq mi)

Basin features
- Progression: Saynbach→ Rhine→ North Sea

The Brexbach (historically: Brachysa) is a river, just under 22 kilometres (14 mi) long, and an orographically left-hand tributary of the Saynbach in the German state of Rhineland-Palatinate.

== Course ==
The Brexbach is formed by the uniting of the Hinterster Bach and Vorderster Bach in the Grenzhausen municipal forest east of Höhr-Grenzhausen. Many consider the Hinterster Bach simply as the name for the upper reaches of the Brexbach.

From the confluence of its two headstreams by some fish ponds, the Brexbach initially runs along the upper edge of the municipality of Höhr-Grenzhausen. In the upper Brexbach valley there was once a mustard mill (Senfmühle), which burned down in 1914 - a memorial stone marks the spot - and other mills: the Farbmühle, Niesmühle and the Kühnsmühle, none of which are used as mills any longer.

The Brexbach next reaches the village of Grenzau (a district of Höhr-Grenzhausen) and flows through it below Grenzau Castle. Grenzau station is the terminus for the Brexbach Valley Railway, a line that closed passenger services in 1989 and goods trains in 1994, but which partly reopened in 2009 as a heritage railway.

Parallel to the historical railway bed runs the 16-kilometre-long (9.9 mi) Brexbach Gorge Way (Brexbachschluchtweg including the Wäller-Tour and Saynsteig paths), a very varied and, in places, challenging, hiking trail along steep and thickly wooded hillsides. It reaches the Brexbach Valley Pathfinder Camp (Pfadfindercamp Brexbachtal) in a meadow bottom; for three kilometres there are camping places, some with refuge huts, and a camp chapel.

The lower reaches of the Brexbach run past the former Abbey of Sayn, flow through the village of Sayn below Sayn Castle immediately next to the old defensive wall, before emptying into the Saynbach in the park of Schloss Sayn. The Saynbach discharges into the Rhine in the area of Bendorf harbour.

== Tributaries ==
- Hinterster Bach (right-hand headstream), 3.2 km
- Vorderster Bach (left-hand headstream), 1.3 km
- Seelbach (right), 2.2 km
- Masselbach (right), 9.5 km
- Felsgraben (right), 0.8 km
- Eisenbach (left), 1.0 km
- Nauorter-Floß (right), 1.6 km

== See also ==
- List of rivers of Rhineland-Palatinate
