= Lower Westerwald =

Geographic region in Rhineland-Palatinate, Germany

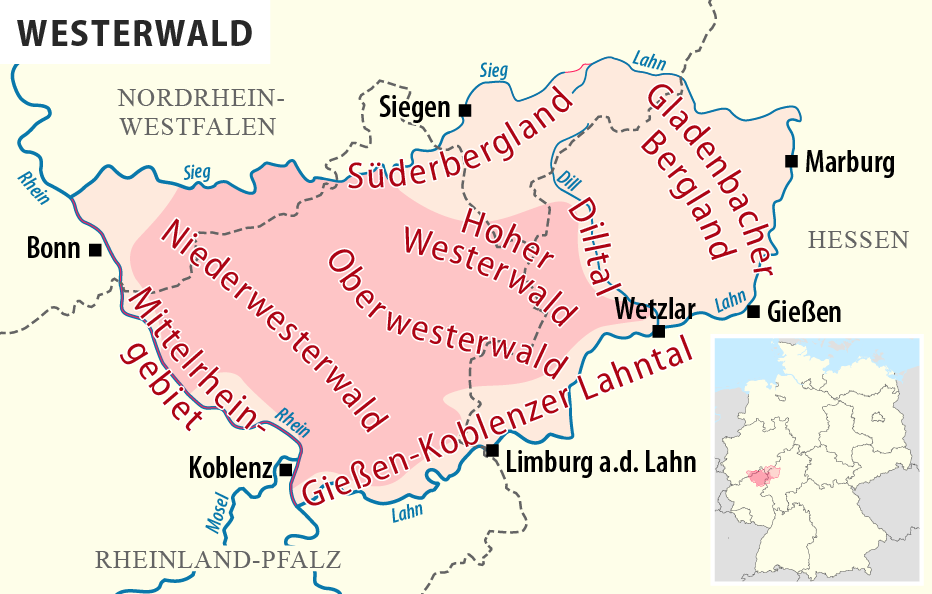
Location of the Lower Westerwald within the Westerwald

The Lower Westerwald (German: Niederwesterwald) is a region, over 1,300 km^{2} in area, in the west of the German hill range, the Westerwald, in the north of the state of Rhineland-Palatinate and, for small elements, in the south of the state of North Rhine-Westphalia. It reaches a height of 544 metres, 12 km northeast of Koblenz at the Montabaur Heights. From a natural region perspective the Lower Westerwald is major unit 324 within the major unit group of Westerwald (32). In the south it also includes the historical cultural landscape of the Kannenbäckerland.

The north(west) part of the Lower Westerwald is also called the Vorderwesterwald ("Anterior Westerwald") because, seen from Cologne and Bonn, it is at the front (vorne, "anterior") of the Westerwald. Its boundaries, however, only vaguely defined.

Another description is Unterwesterwald ("Under Westerwald"). It surfaces frequently in the names of clubs and institutions, but is not however used in any standardised way. It generally refers to the region of the old county of Unterwesterwaldkreis, which did not include the whole of the Lower Westerwald to the west and north, but extended further east into the natural region of the Upper Westerwald.

== Name ==
The prefix "Nieder" does not mean that the landscape as a whole was more level than the neighbouring Upper Westerwald to the east. Rather, it refers to the rivers on its boundaries - the Lahn and Sieg - as well as the rivers on its interior - the Saynbach and Wied - the lower reaches of which pass through the Lower Westerwald.
