= Westerwald (natural region) =

- Classification: Handbook of Natural Region Divisions of Germany
- Level 1 Region: Central Uplands
- Level 2 Region: 24–25, 27–33, 56 → Rhenish Massif
- Natural region: 32 → Westerwald

Natural region characteristics
- Landscape type: Mittelgebirge (basement, partly volcanically uplifted)
- Highest point: Fuchskaute (657.3 m)
- State(s): Hesse, North Rhine-Westphalia, Rhineland-Palatinate
- Country: Germany

As well as being a low mountain range, the Westerwald is also a natural region in the system of natural regional division of Germany. Within that it is a major unit group with the number "32". According to this system the major unit group of the Westerwald belongs to the basement plate (Grundgebirgsschollenland), which describes the type of mountain-building process by which it was formed. The major unit group extends across the states of Hesse, North Rhine-Westphalia and Rhineland-Palatinate. It is roughly bounded by the valleys of the Lahn (east and south), Rhine and Sieg (via Heller), whereby the hills immediately south of the Heller and Sieg are not considered to be part of it.

== Natural region divisions ==
Below the major unit group are the major units which, in turn, are divided into sub-units, part-units and base-units.

- 320 - Gladenbach Uplands (780 km^{2})

- 320.0 Lahn-Dill Upland

- 320.00 Breidenbach Bottom
- 320.01 Bottenhorn Plateaux
- 320.02 Scheld Forest
- 320.03 Zollbuche
- 320.04 Hörre
- 320.05 Krofdorf-Königsberg Forest

- 320.1 Gladenbach Hills

- 320.10 Damshäuser Kuppen
- 320.11 Elnhausen-Michelbach Bowl
- 320.12 Salzböde Valley
- 320.13 Niederweidbach Basin

- 320.2 Upper Lahn Valley

- 321 - Dill Valley (174 km^{2})

- 321.0 Lower Dill Valley
- 321.1 Upper Dill Valley (with Dietzhölze valley)
- 321.2 Struth

- 322 - High Westerwald (346 km^{2})

- 322.0 Westerwald Basalt Plateaux
- 322.1 Neunkhausen-Weitefeld Plateau

- 323 - Upper Westerwald (669 km^{2})

- 323.0 Westerwald East Slope (Dill Westerwald)
- 323.1 Upper Westerwald Kuppenland
- 323.2 Dreifeld Weiherland
- 323.3 South Upper Westerwald Hills

- 323.30 Steinefrenzen Plateau

- 324 - Lower Westerwald (1316 km^{2})

- 324.0 Emsbach-Gelbach Heights

- 324.00 Horchheim Heights
- 324.01 Emsbach Valley
- 324.02 Plateaux of Welschneudorf
- 324.03 Gelbach valley
- 324.04 Eppenrode Plateau (Hochstein Ridge)

- 324.1 Montabaur Heights
- 324.2 Montabaur Basin
- 324.3 Kannenbäcker Plateaux
- 324.4 Rhein-Wied Ridge
- 324.5 Waldbreitbach Wied Valley
- 324.6 Sayn-Wied Plateaux
  - 324.60 Isenburg Sayn Valley
- 324.7 Dierdorf Basin
- 324.8 Asbach-Altenkirchen Plateaux
  - 324.80 Asbach Plateau
  - 324.81 Altenkirchen Plateau
- 324.9 Rhine Westerwald Volcanic Ridge

The Westerwald in a narrower sense is generally considered to be the major unit groups 322 to 324.

== Literature ==
- Emil Meynen, J. Schmithüsen et al. (eds.): Handbuch der naturräumlichen Gliederung Deutschlands. Selbstverlag der Bundesanstalt für Landeskunde, Remagen, 1953–1962 (Part 1, contains issues 1–5), DNB-IDN 451803159.
- Emil Meynen, J. Schmithüsen et al. (eds.): Handbuch der naturräumlichen Gliederung Deutschlands. Selbstverlag der Bundesanstalt für Landeskunde, Remagen, 1959–1962 (Part 2, contains issues 6–9), DNB-IDN 451803167.
