= Nassau Nature Park =

Nature park in Rhineland-Palatinate, Germany

Coordinates: 50.3300°N 7.8100°E

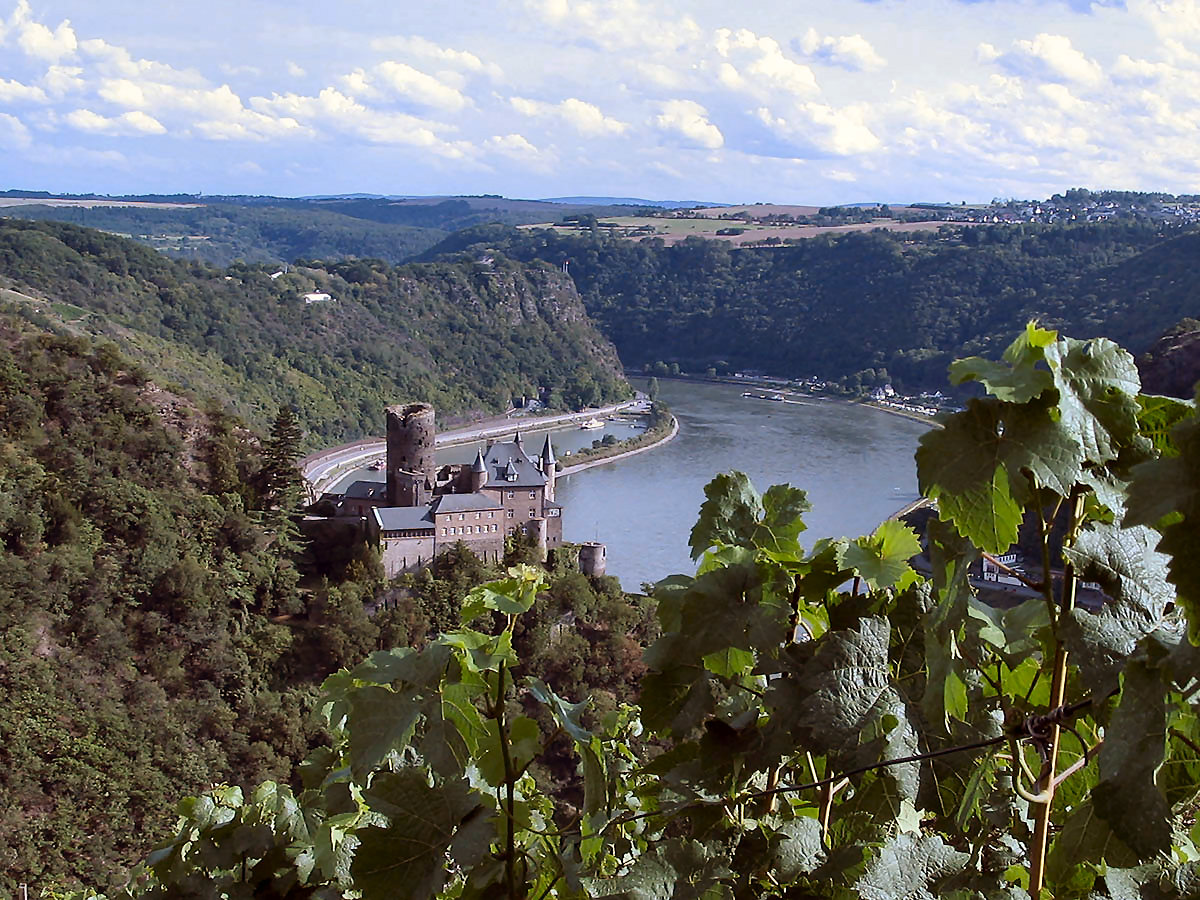
St. Goarshausen, with Katz Castle and the Loreley rock

The Nassau Nature Park is a 561.71 km^{2} nature park in the southwestern Westerwald and northwestern Taunus in Rhineland-Palatinate. It was designated in November 1963 and expanded in 1979.

== Geography ==
The Nassau Nature Park lies in the Rhenish Slate Mountains, with the Lahn Valley forming its main east-west axis. The park also includes parts of the Westerwald, the Middle Rhine Valley and the Taunus. Its highest mountain is the Alarmstange in the Montabaurer Höhe part of the Westerwald at 545.2 m above sea level, and the Graue Kopf in the western Hintertaunus is the highest point in the Taunus at 543.4 m. Just south of the state border, bordering the Nassau Nature Park for a few kilometres, is the Rhine-Taunus Nature Park in Hesse.

The total area (561.71 km^{2}) of the Nassau Nature Park does not include the built-up areas of the towns and municipalities belonging to it. The Rhein-Lahn-Kreis and the Westerwald-Kreis have a 70:30 share in the nature park and form the Zweckverband Naturpark Nassau.
