= Dreiseenplatte =

Three lakes in Munich, Germany

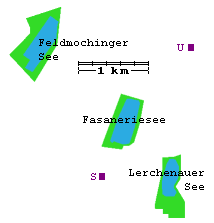
Dreiseenplatte

Dreiseenplatte is the name of three lakes in Feldmoching-Hasenbergl in the northern part of Munich, Germany.

The lakes are: Lerchenauer See, Fasaneriesee and Feldmochinger See.

== Photos ==
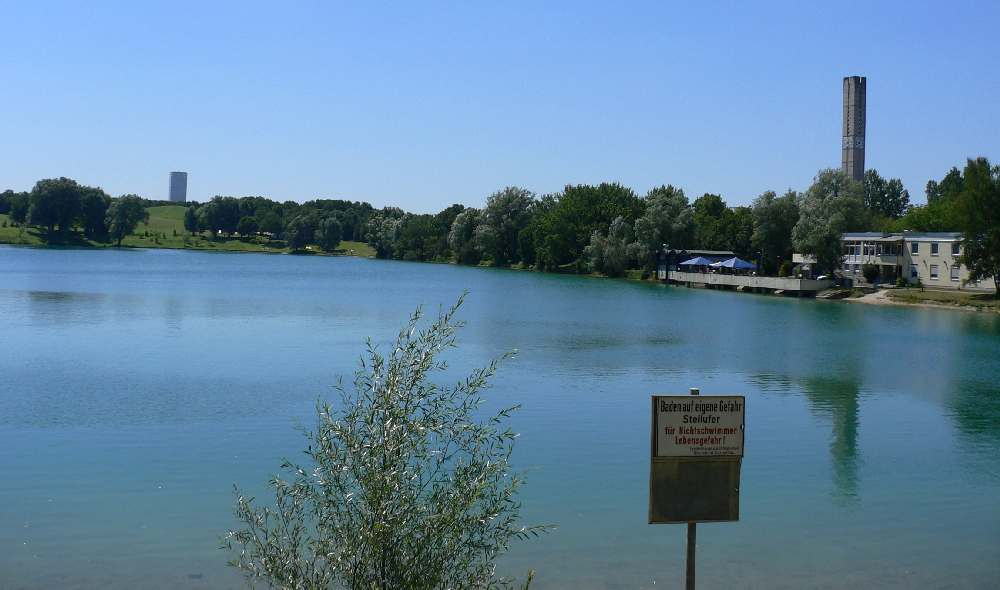
Lerchenauer See

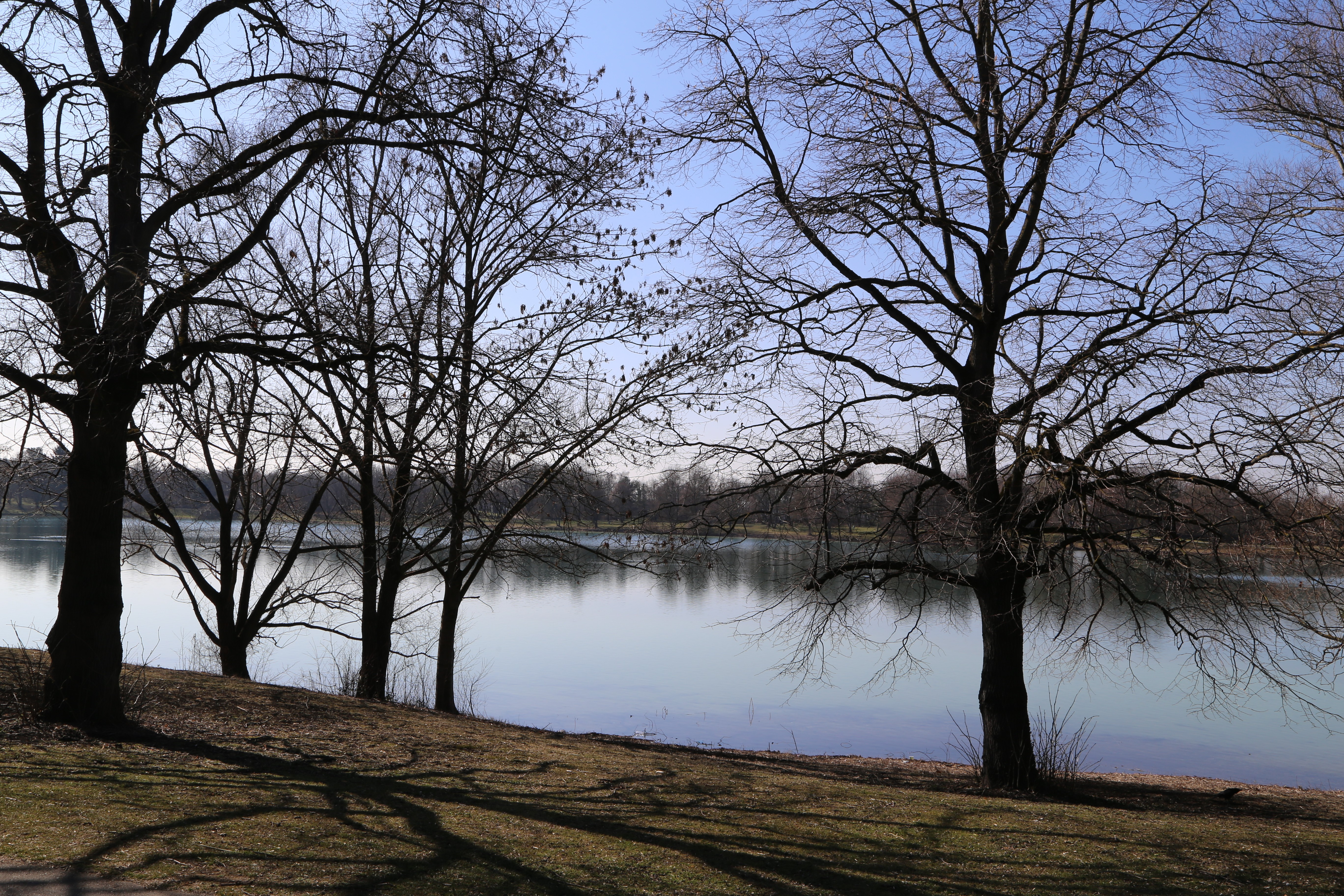
Fasaneriesee

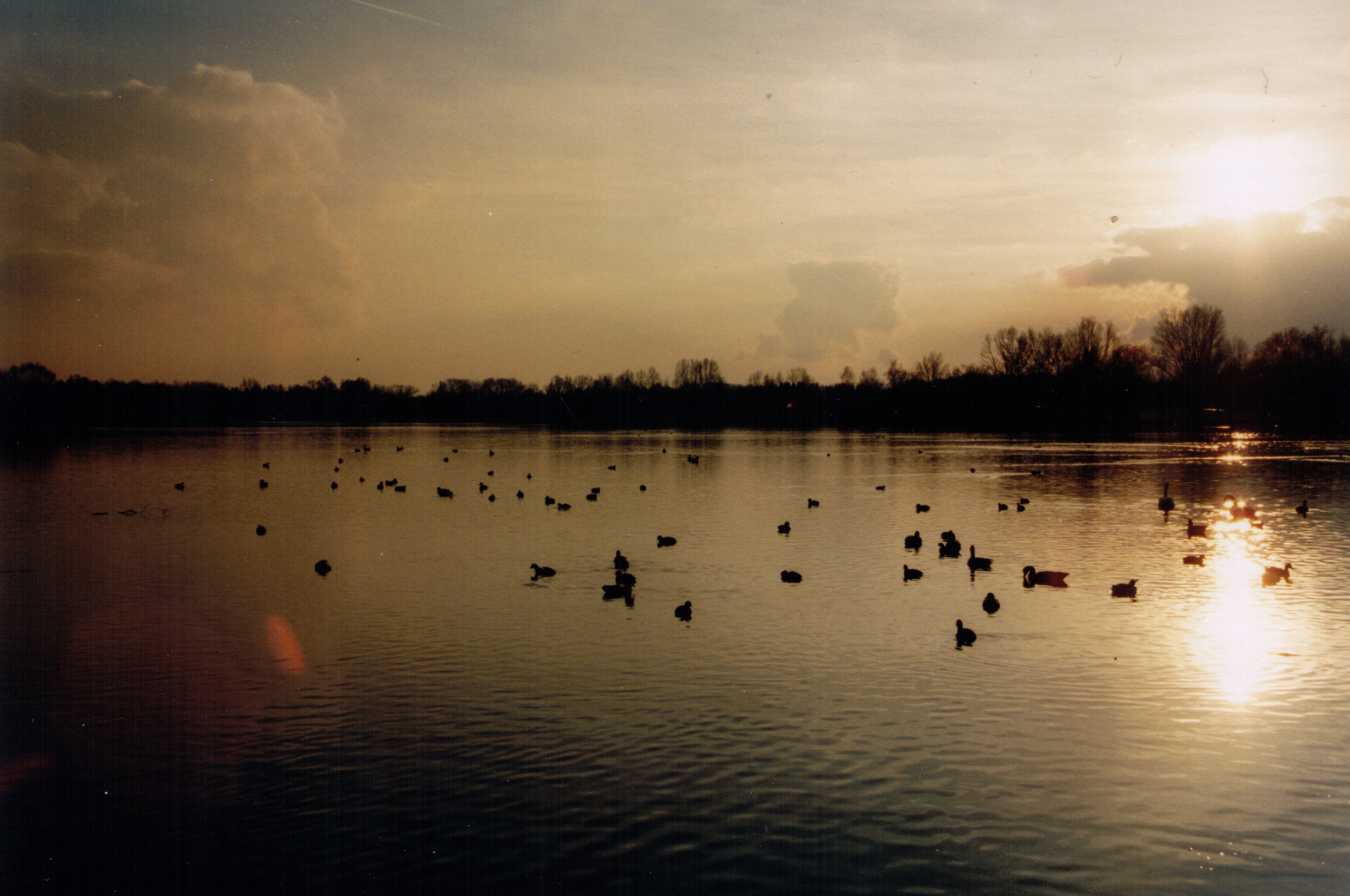
Feldmochinger See

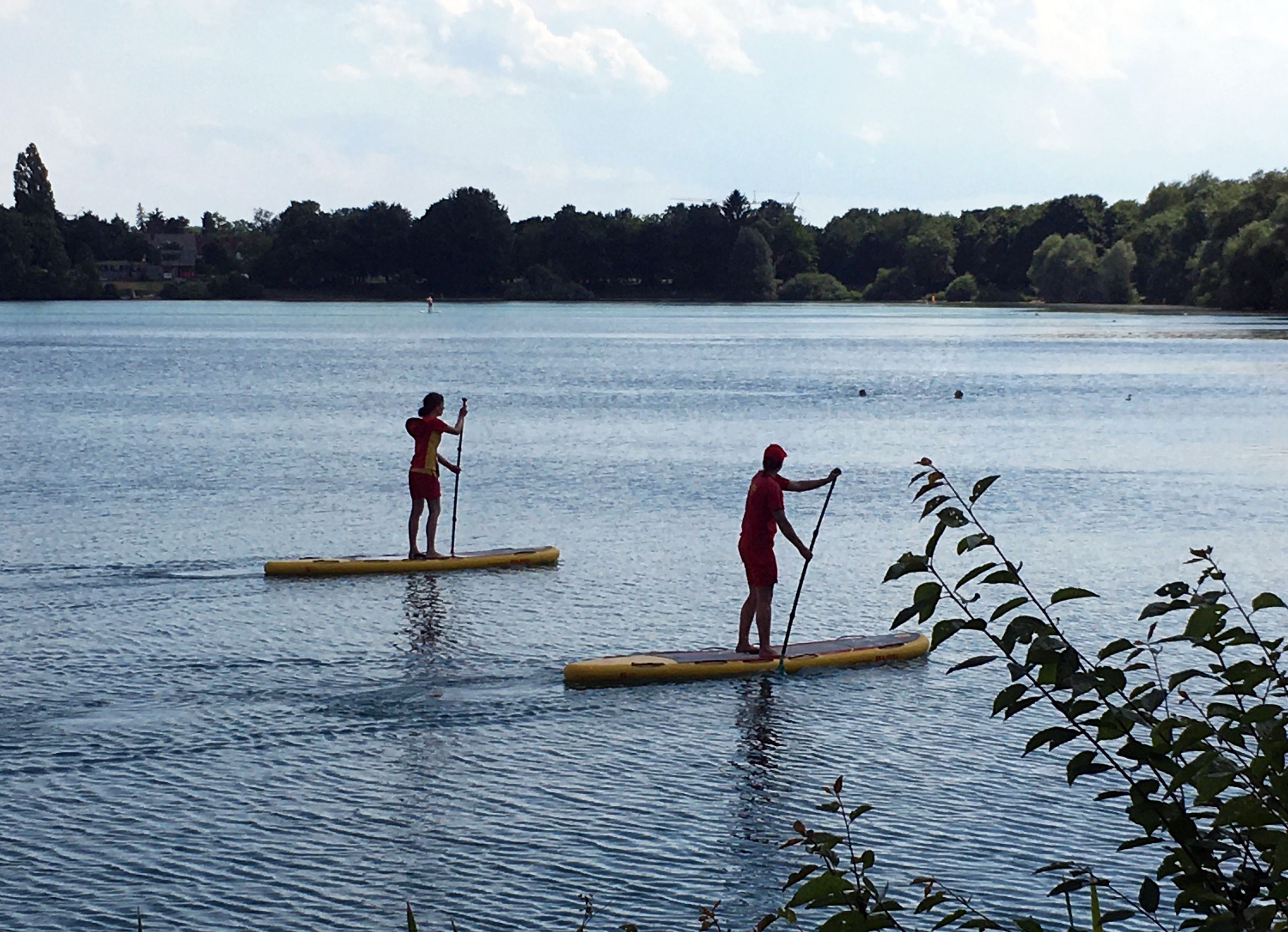
Two lifeguards of the DLRG patrolling a public bathing area of the Fasaneriesee in summer 2022
