= Montabaur Heights =

Montabaurer Höhe
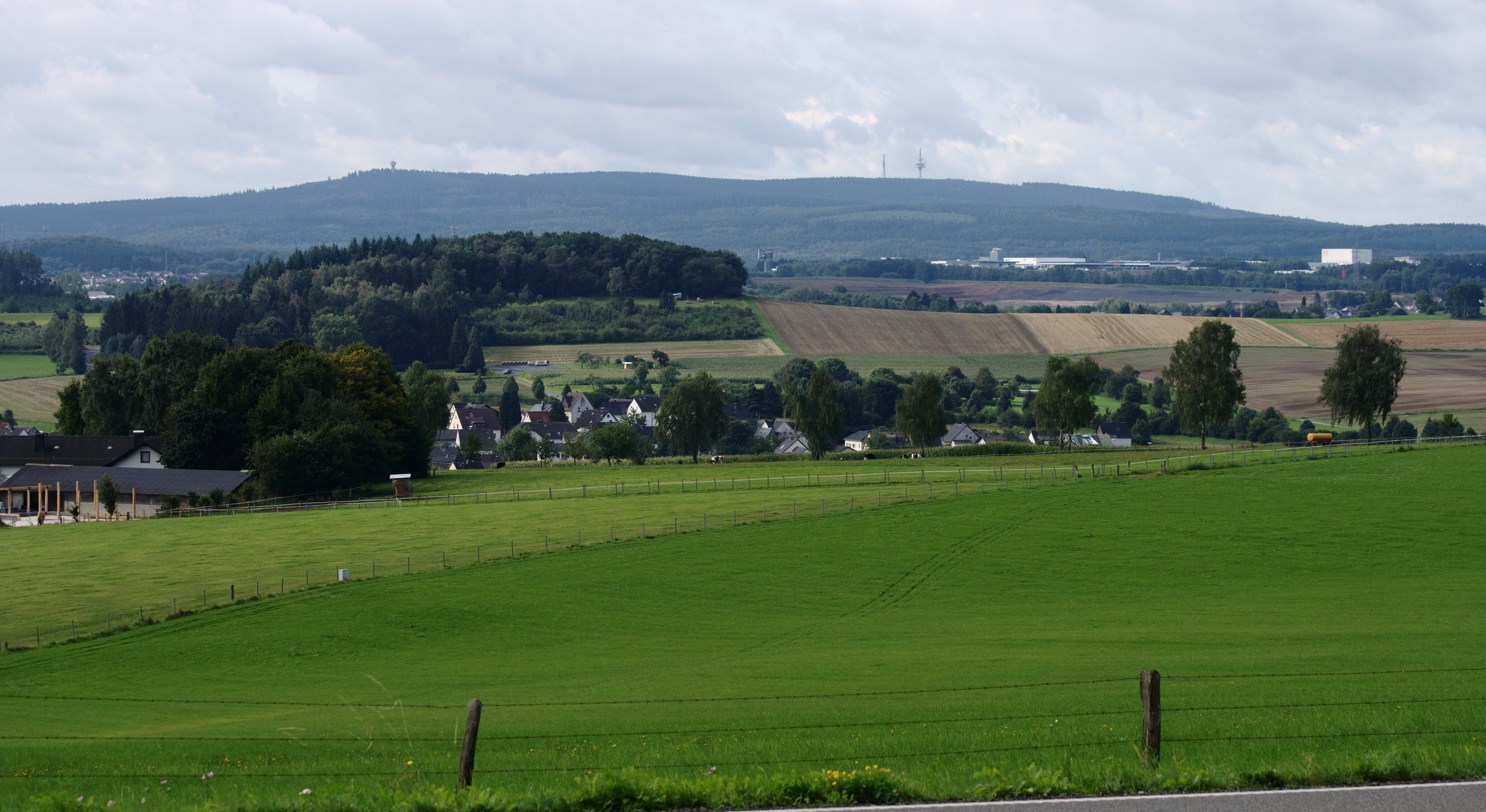
- View over Vielbach by the

Highest point
- Peak: Alarmstange
- Elevation: 545.2 m (1,789 ft)

Dimensions
- Length: 12 km (7.5 mi)

Geography
- State(s): near Montabaur; Westerwaldkreis, Rhineland-Palatinate, Germany
- Range coordinates: 50°25′29.9″N 7°44′2″E
- Parent range: Lower Westerwald

Geology
- Orogeny: Mittelgebirge
- Rock type: Quartzite

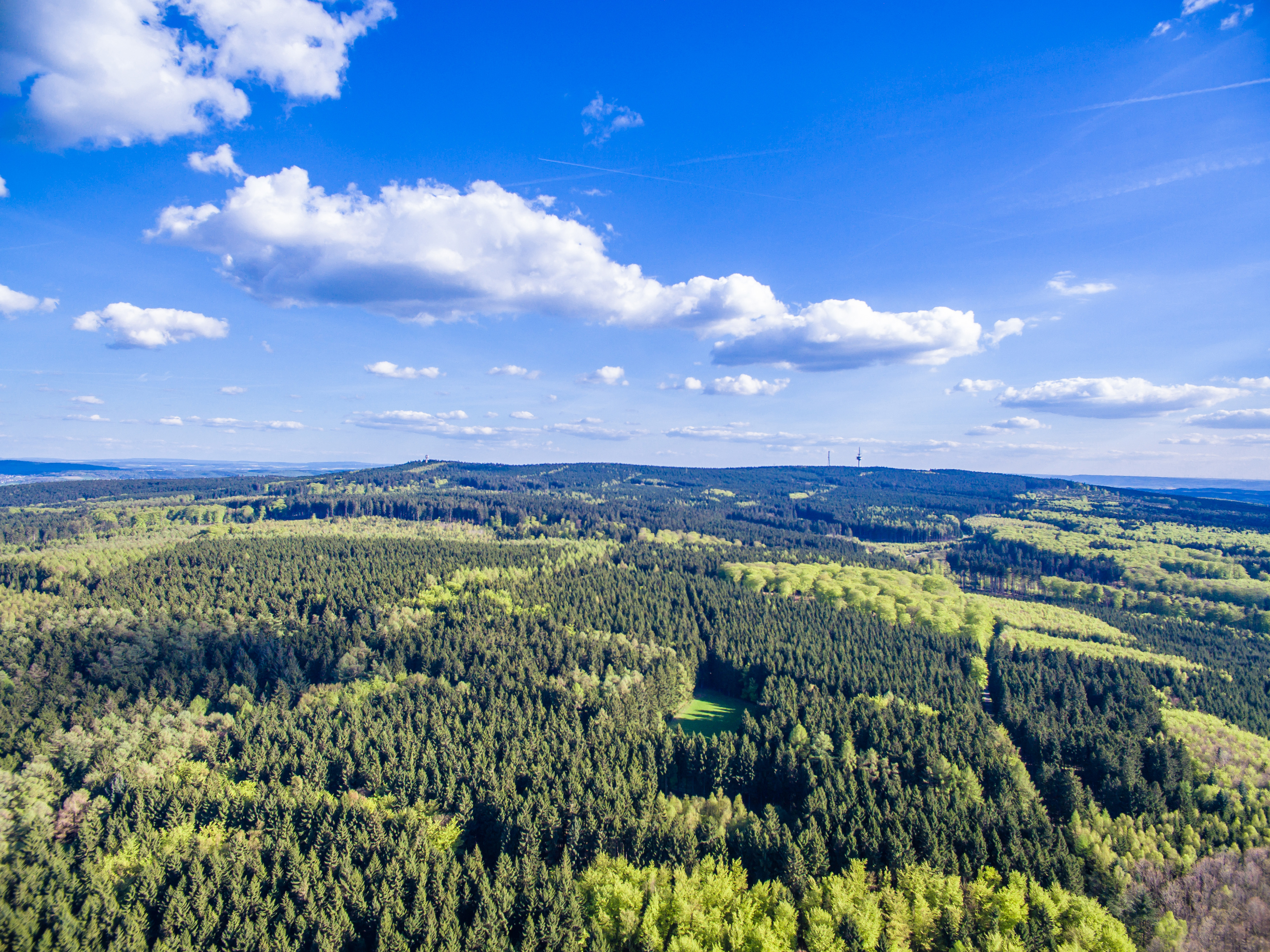
Bird's eye view: view from Ransbach-Baumbach looking SSE towards the Köppel (l) and Alarmstange (r)

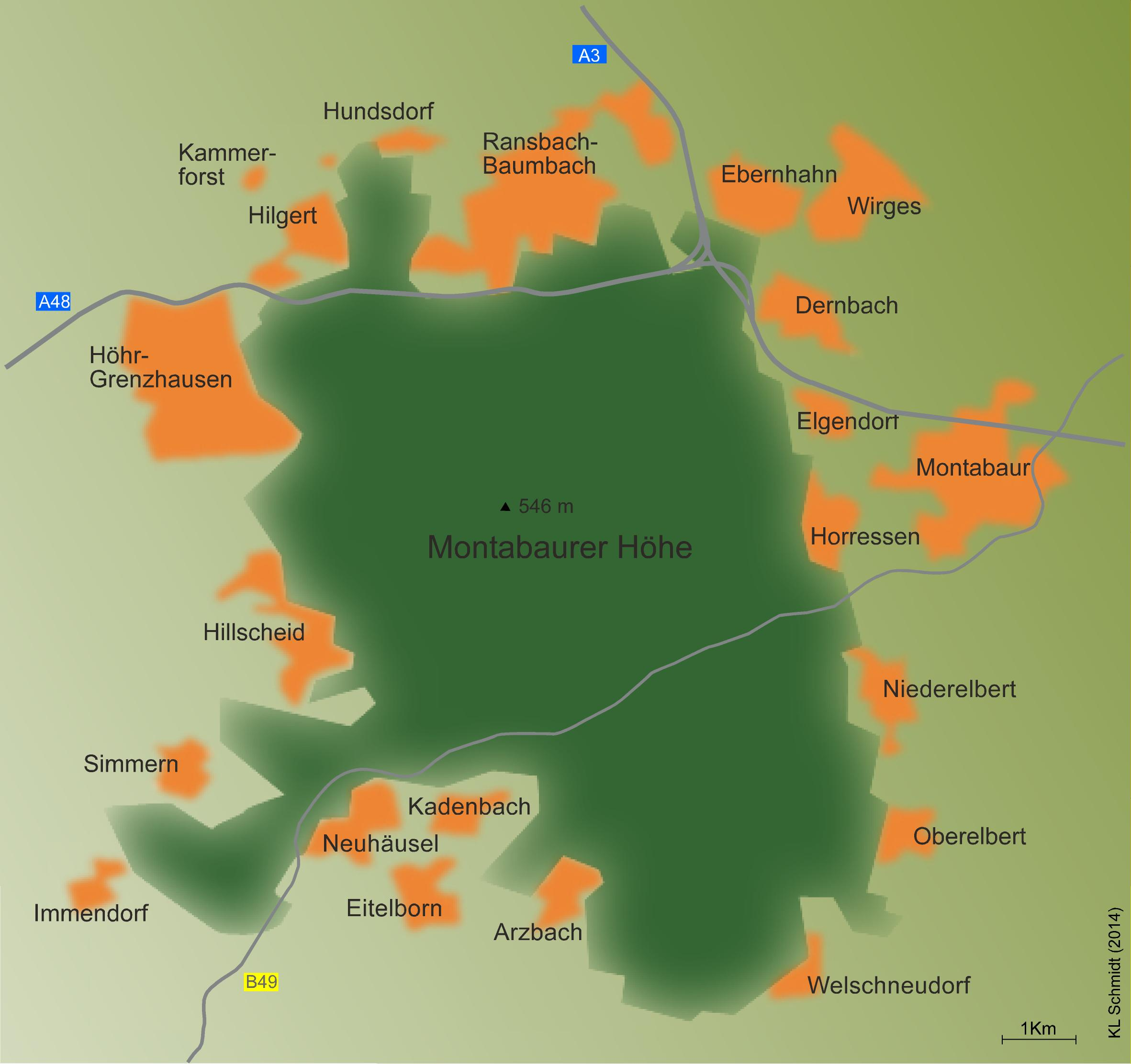
Map of the woods of the Montabaur Heights "in the narrow sense"

The Montabaur Heights (German: Montabaurer Höhe) are a 10 to 15 kilometre long, mostly wooded hill ridge in the southwestern Westerwald in Germany and lies mainly within the county of Westerwaldkreis. The ridge is geographically classified as sub-natural region 324.1 of the Lower Westerwald (major unit 324) and has its highest hill, the 545.2 m above sea level (NHN) Alarmstange, whose summit rises six kilometres west of the town of Montabaur and about 12 km northeast of Koblenz.

== Literature ==
- Mischa Ferdinand, Ursula Braun: Die Farnflora der Montabaurer Höhe, Zweckverb. Naturpark Nassau, 1997
