= Jean-Joseph Tranchot =

- Born: January 2, 1752; Kœur-la-Petite, France
- Died: April 30, 1815 (aged 63); Montlhéry, France
- Occupation: Cartographer

Jean-Joseph Tranchot (January 2, 1752 – April 30, 1815) was a French military cartographer. He is most well known for his topographical survey of the Rhineland under Napoleon, and his assistance in measuring the meridian arc of France with astronomer Pierre Méchain to determine to length of the meter.

== Biography ==
Tranchot was born on January 2, 1752, in Kœur-la-Petite, France. His parents were Remigius Tranchot, a carpenter, and Maria Maury.

Tranchot was first employed as a cartographer in 1774 in the triangulation of Corsica, which had been ordered by an edict from the French crown in 1770. Upon completion of this task, Tranchot studied astronomy with Pierre Méchain before he was given orders to triangulate and link his Corsica map with neighboring Sardinia and coastal Tuscany. This task was completed with use of a new invention, the repeating circle, from 1788 to 1791, and he was subsequently recognized by the Méchain and the French Academy of Sciences for his work.

Following the cartography of these Mediterranean islands, Tranchot was approached by the French Academy of Sciences to accompany Méchain as his primary adjutant in measuring the southern part of meridian arc of France. This project, spanning 1791 to 1799, started in Barcelona and ended at Rodez, and the resulting measurement became the basis for the metric system's unit of length, the meter. Alongside working with Méchain, Tranchot assisted Jean Baptiste Joseph Delambre in measuring the baseline at Perpignan to assist in the meridian survey.

In 1794, Tranchot was appointed to the scientific staff of the Dépôt de la Guerre. By 1801, the French government under Napoleon promoted him to the rank of Colonel and tasked him with mapping the Rhineland's topography. This final work lasted from 1801 until 1814. In this time, Tranchot completed 167 maps of the area, now known as the "Tranchot Maps". The project was finished in 1828 by Karl Freiherr von Müffling.

Tranchot died in 1815 from a stroke.

== Tranchot Maps ==
Rhineland quadrants surveyed by Tranchot

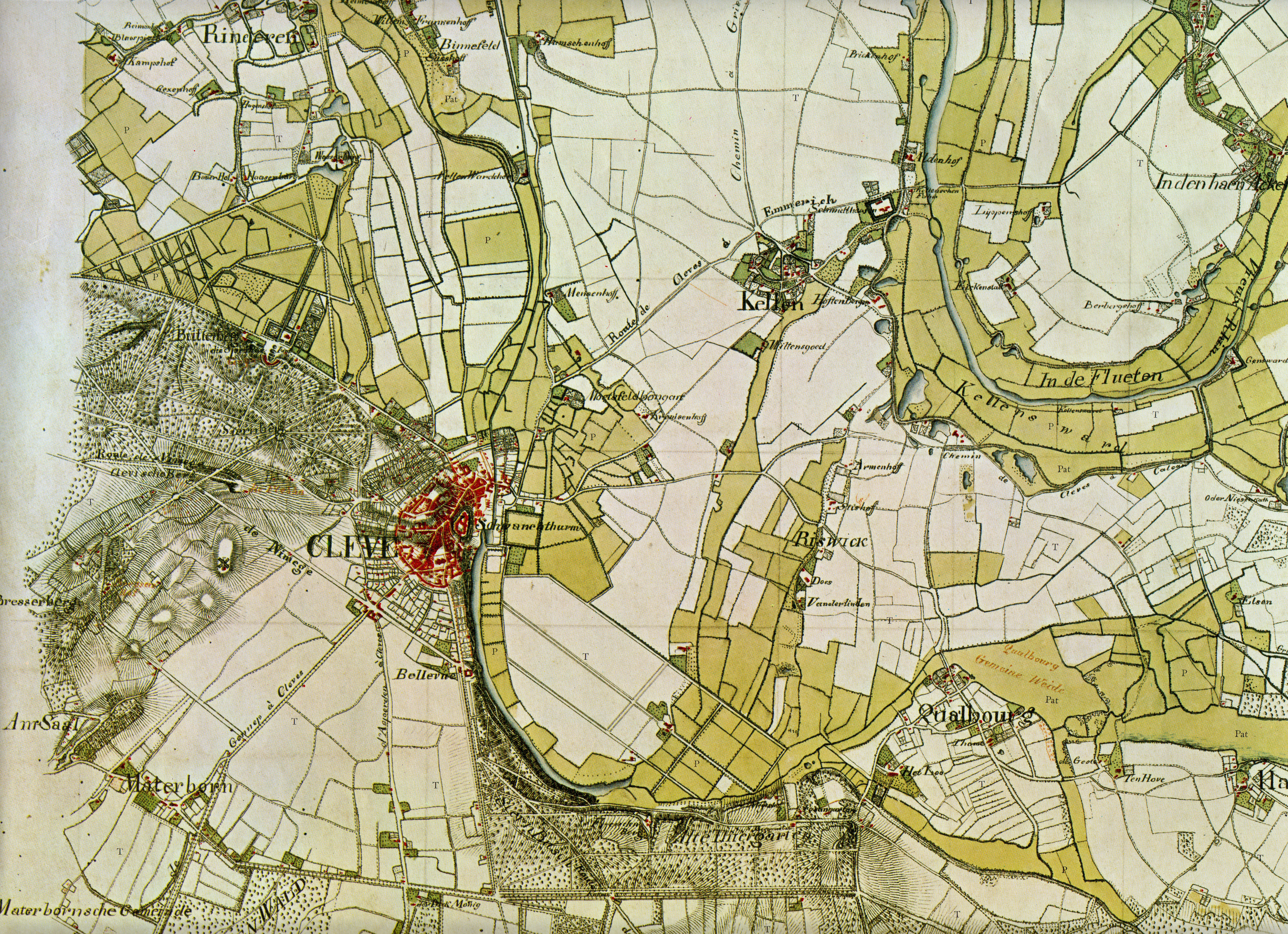
Survey of Kleve, Germany

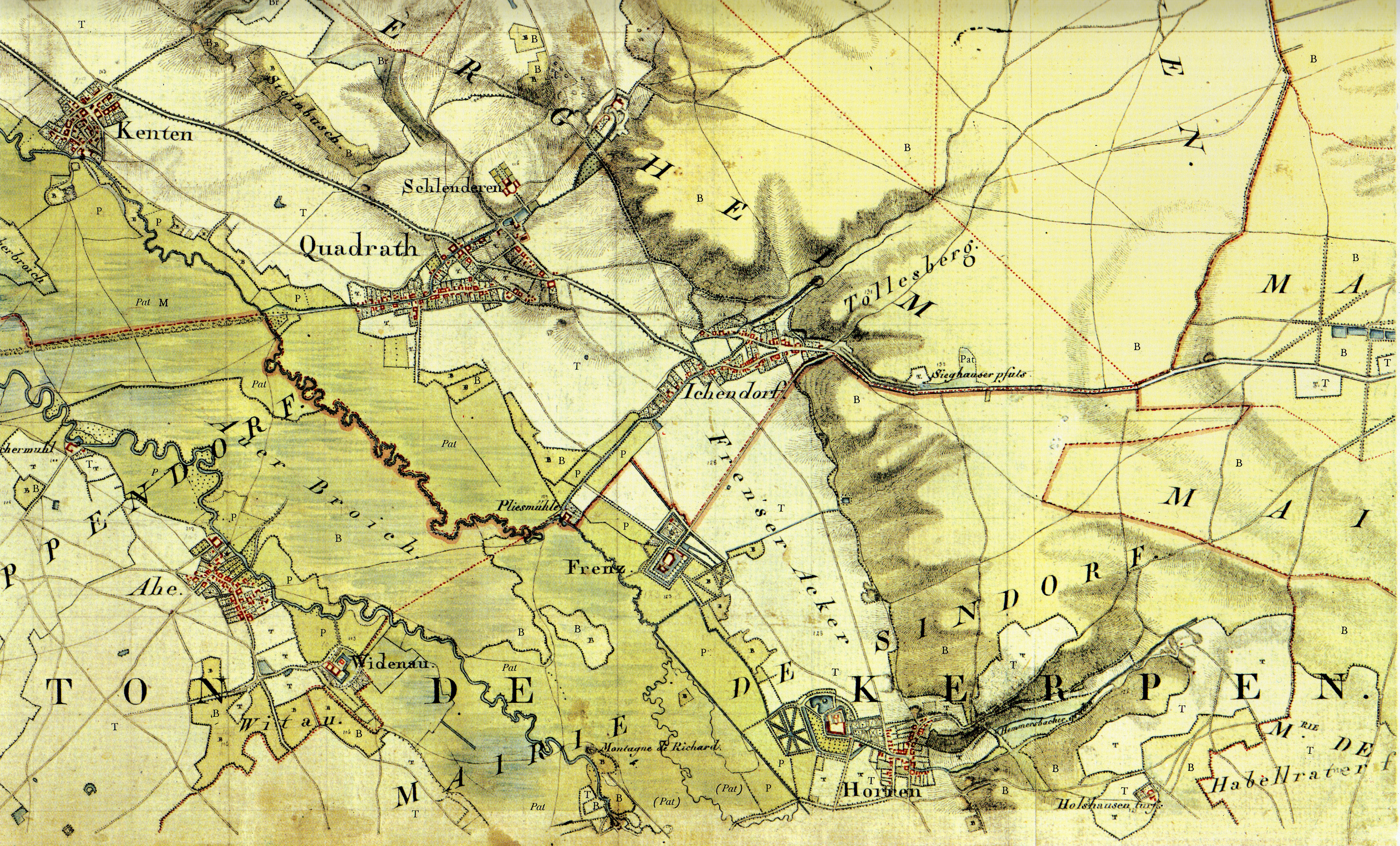
Survey of Bergheim, Germany
