= Sayn (river) =

River in Germany

Sayn/Saynbach
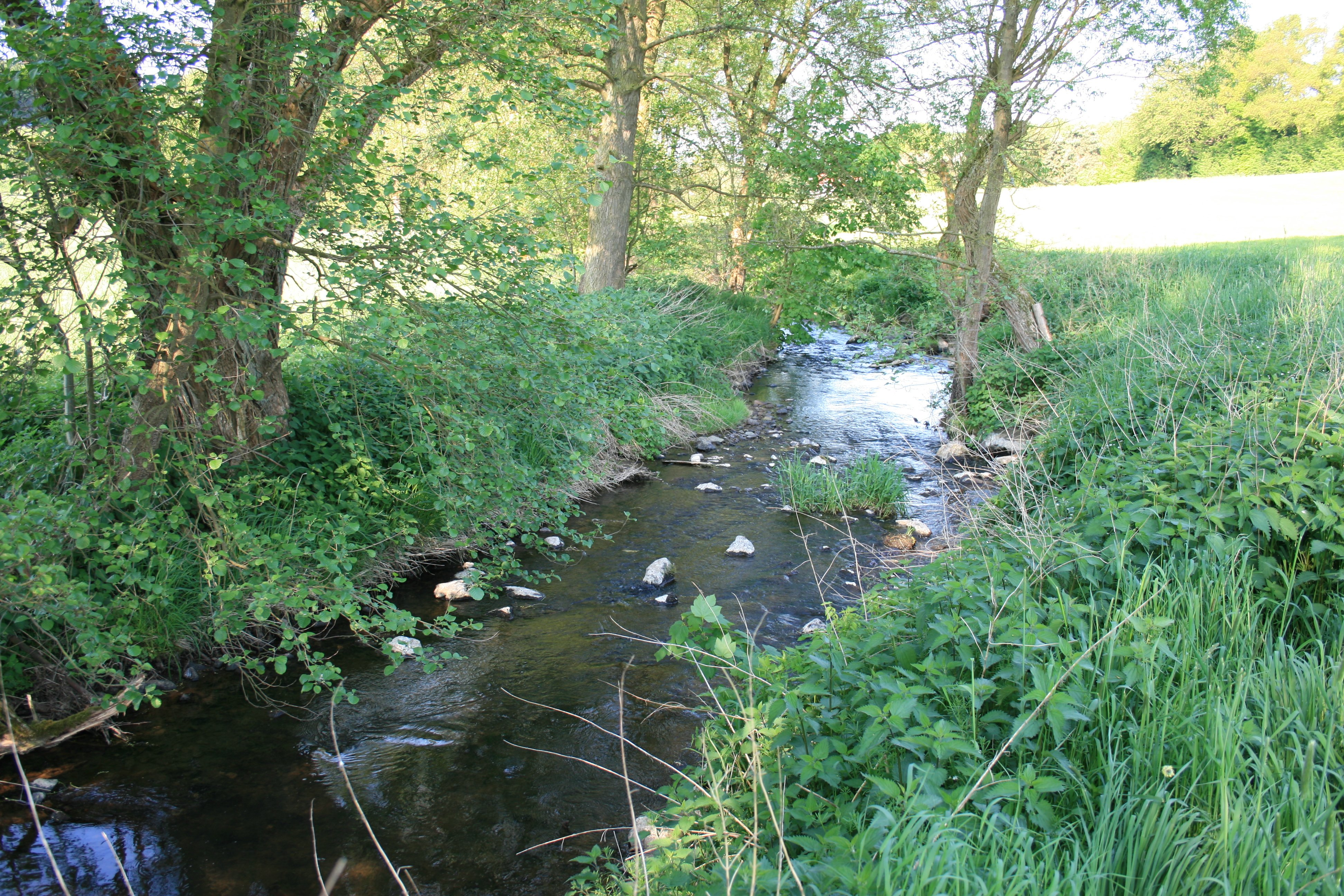
- The Sayn between Zürbach and Maxsain

Location
- Country: Germany
- State: Rhineland-Palatinate
- Reference no.: DE: 2712

Physical characteristics
- Source
  - location: Near Himburg in the Upper Westerwald
  - coordinates: 50°34′14″N 7°52′14″E
  - elevation: 430 m
- Mouth
  - location: In Bendorf into the Rhine
  - coordinates: 50°25′07″N 7°33′27″E
  - elevation: 70 m
- Length: 42.7 km (26.5 mi)
- Basin size: 222.348 km^{2} (85.849 sq mi)

Basin features
- Progression: Rhine→ North Sea

The Sayn (frequently also called the Saynbach) is a small river, just under 43 kilometres (27 mi) long, in the south of the Westerwald hill region of Germany. It rises near Himburg in the Upper Westerwald and empties into the River Rhine in Bendorf (between the towns of Koblenz and Neuwied).

== See also ==
- List of rivers of Rhineland-Palatinate
