= Elz, Hesse =

Elz
- Municipality
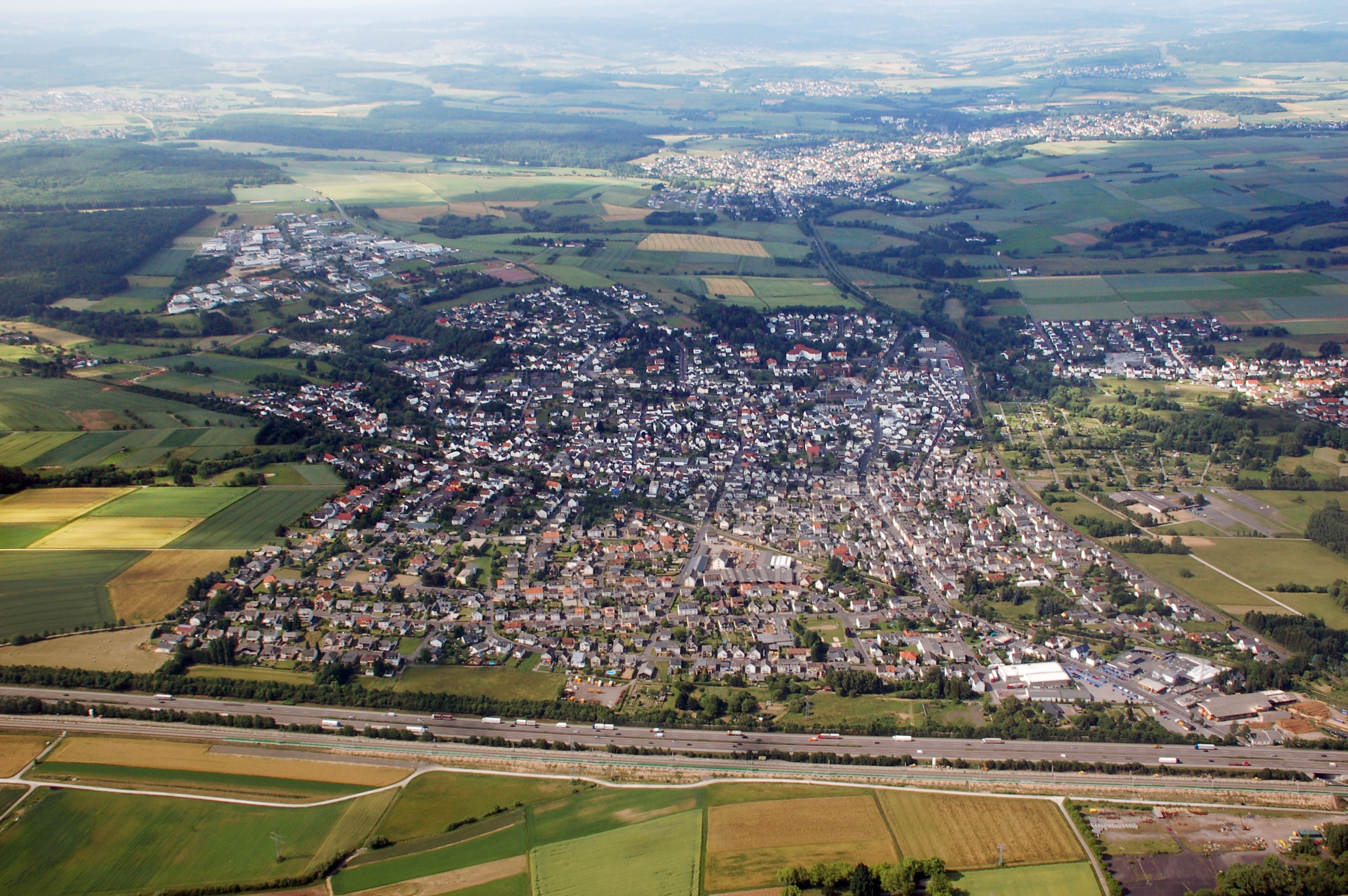
- Aerial view

- Flag Coat of arms

- Location of Elz within Limburg-Weilburg district
- Interactive map of Elz
- Location within Germany Location within Hesse
- Coordinates: 50°25′N 8°2′E
- Country: Germany
- State: Hesse
- Admin. region: Gießen
- District: Limburg-Weilburg

Government
  - Mayor (2017–23): Horst Kaiser (CDU)

Area
  - Total: 16.86 km^{2} (6.51 sq mi)
- Elevation: 130 m (430 ft)

Population (2025-12-31)
  - Total: 8,101
  - Density: 480.5/km^{2} (1,244/sq mi)
- Time zone: UTC+01:00 (CET)
  - Summer (DST): UTC+02:00 (CEST)
- Postal codes: 65604
- Dialling codes: 06431, 06433
- Vehicle registration: LM, WEL
- Website: www.elz.de

Elz (German: [ˈɛlts]) is a municipality in Limburg-Weilburg district in western Hesse, Germany, on the boundary with Rhineland-Palatinate.

== Geography ==
=== Location ===
Elz lies at an elevation of 110 to 291 m north of the Lahn in the Limburg Basin with the municipal area reaching into the heights on its western edge and thereby into the area of the Lower Westerwald (Elzer Wald). From north to south the municipal area is crossed by the flat-bottomed Elbbach valley, whose resident stream rises in the High Westerwald and flows south from Elz, emptying into the Lahn.

=== Geology ===
The Elbbach's broad lower reaches follow a tectonically created fault (Elzer Graben) which stretches northwards into the community of Dornburg. The Devonian bedrock here is, especially west of the Elbbach, overlain with thick sedimentary fill from the Tertiary (clays, sands, gravels) of which especially the quartz sand has afforded the region some economic importance. Overlying these in turn are layers of Ice Age loess deposits, which have laid the basis for fruitful agriculture.

=== Neighbouring communities ===
Elz borders in the north on the community of Hundsangen (in the Westerwaldkreis in Rhineland-Palatinate) and the town of Hadamar, in the east and south on the town of Limburg (both in Limburg-Weilburg), and in the west on the communities of Hambach (in the Rhein-Lahn-Kreis in Rhineland-Palatinate), Görgeshausen, Niedererbach and Obererbach (all three in the Westerwaldkreis).

=== Constituent communities ===
Elz's Ortsteile are, with population figures as at 31 December 2007, Elz (7,949) and Malmeneich (344).

All together, the community has 8,293 inhabitants. Elz's main centre, also called Elz, is, after Limburg an der Lahn's main centre the second biggest place in Limburg-Weilburg.

=== Climate ===
The yearly average temperature in Elz is 8.5 °C and in Malmeneich 7.9 °C.

The average yearly precipitation ranges from 600 to 650 mm in Elz and in Malmeneich is 720 mm.

Spring's onset falls on average in Elz sometime between 29 April and 5 May.

== History ==
The placename presumably springs from the alder (Erle in German). Elz crops up for the first time in the 933 Wiltrud document, now no longer in existence. The oldest existing document comes from the year 1145.

The village on the important strata publica, or Hohe Straße ("High Road") between Frankfurt am Main and Cologne was in the Middle Ages at first under royal rule. Later the property passed to the Electorate of Trier. The outlying countryside, however, belonged to the Counts of Nassau, which led to centuries-long border disputes.

On 1 September 1442, Elz was granted town rights by King Friedrich IV. The document attesting this, which guaranteed the Elz townsmen in the Late Middle Ages their freedom was effected by Archbishop of Trier Jacob I of Sierck. The original document has been lost, but in the Landeshauptarchiv Koblenz, three authenticated copies from 1442 and 1443 are kept (Bestand 1 A, Nr. 8101-8103). The town fortification that was soon built was later torn down by the Counts of Nassau. Complicated ownership relationships led to further disputes between the Landgraves of Hesse, the Electorate of Trier and Nassau.

With Secularization in 1802, Trier's overlordship ended and Elz passed to the Principality of Nassau-Weilburg. From 1806 it belonged to the Duchy of Nassau. In 1866 it passed to Prussia.

== Religion ==
=== History ===
Until the 13th century, Elz belonged with some 20 other places to the parish of Dietkirchen, which with its Romanesque basilica was widely known throughout the Lahn valley. According to information handed down, Elz was already an autonomous parish beginning in 1234.

Before the current parish church of Sankt Johannes der Täufer ("Saint John the Baptist"), which to a considerable extent shapes the village's appearance, a smaller church stood on the same spot, whose exact dimensions and appearance are only vaguely known. References can be found to a Romanesque building with a length of roughly 13.5 m and a breadth of 9.3 m. The graveyard, now lying west of the church, lay at that time around the old parish church.

=== Current parish church ===
The foundation stones were laid on 27 June 1852, on the occasion of which a celebratory Mass by Bishop Peter Josef Blum and Vicar-General Klein was said. A stone plaque with the year 1852 over the sandstone architrave block facing Pfortenstraße still witnesses this event. After about two years, the church, albeit still without a steeple, could be consecrated by Bishop Blum on 19 November 1854.

In the altar are found relics of the martyrs Boniface, Clement and Blandinia. The church consecration festival was set at that time to the first Sunday after the autumn Ember days (these being the Wednesday, Friday and Saturday in the week after Holy Cross Day on 14 September). Since the German Bishops' Conference in 1872 moved the festival, the third Sunday in September has been set as the deadline for the kermis.

On 22 April 1908, the church executive and community council approved the building of a new tower. Its height is 48 m, and since 8 December 1952 it has been fitted with a set of four bells.

=== Pastors of the community since the 20th century ===
- Clemens Verdelmann 1892-1914
- Ferdinand Müller 1914-1922
- Caspar Fein 1922-1956
- Alois Weier 1956–1967
- Reinhard Klein 1967–1986
- Rainer Saarholz 1986–1997
- Franz-Josef Kremer 1997-2016
- Gereon Rehberg 2016-2019
- Steffen Henrich since 2019

== Politics ==
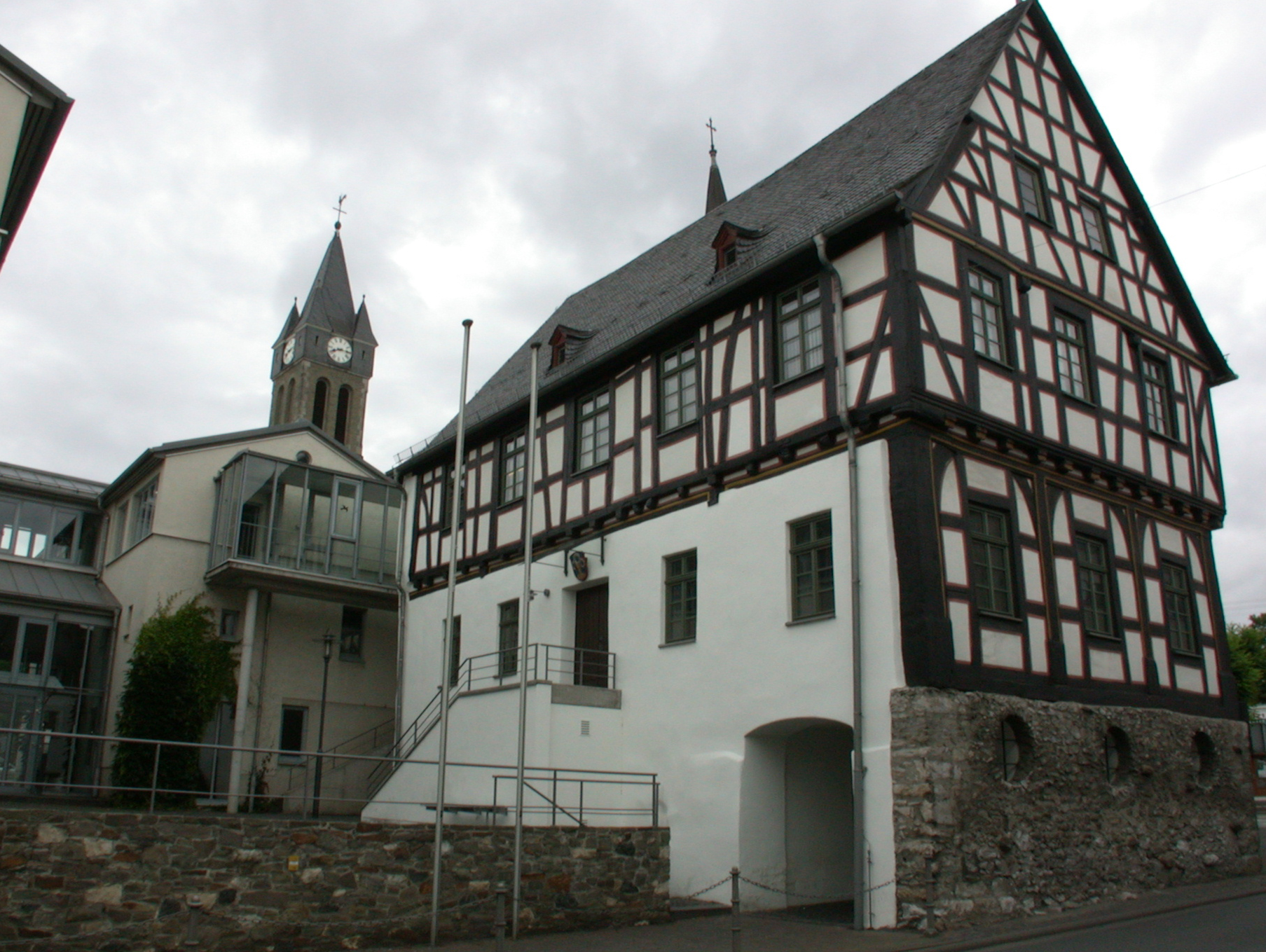
Elz Town Hall, in the background the parish church's (Saint John the Baptist) steeple

=== Community council ===
The municipal election held on 26 March 2006 yielded the following results:

Parties and voter communities		% 2011	seats 2011	% 2006	seats 2006
CDU	Christian Democratic Union of Germany	55.0	17	60.7	19
SPD	Social Democratic Party of Germany	28.7	9	21.9	7
FWG	Freie Wählergemeinschaft Elz	16.3	5	13.8	4
GBE	Bündnis 90/Die Grünen	–	–	3.6	1
Total		100.0	31	100.0	31
voter turnout in %		45.7		44.6	

Council consists of 9 members.

=== Mayors since the 20th century ===
- Johann Schmidt 1871-1911
- Edmund Pnischek 1911-1918
- Jakob Sommer 1919-1923
- Josef Drexler 1923-1935
- Otto Kempa 1937-1945
- Joseph Friedrich 1945-1967
- Theo Michaely 1967-1974
- Günter Schmitt 1974-1981
- Winfried Schumacher 1982-2005
- Horst Kaiser since 2006

The mayor who currently holds office, Horst Kaiser (CDU) was elected on 25 September 2005 with 84.8% of the vote.

== Culture and sightseeing ==
=== Local recreation area ===
The local recreation area "Anlagen" lies not far from the middle of the community, north of the parish church on a bank towards Malmeneich. After the decision to build a chapel on this bank was overturned, this area came into being in 1911 in the form of a little wood. The name "Anlagen" ("facilities" or "sites" in German) was in the beginning only meant to be the working name, but it so strongly worked its way into the inhabitants’ everyday speech that it stuck, and is still used as the area's name today. The "Anlagen" nowadays offer, besides the structuredly laid-out tree learning path, a miniature golf course and a playground. The Elz Beautification Club (Elzer Verschönerungsverein) has been taking care of the recreation area since 1913.

=== Regular events ===
- Elzer Kirmes: One attraction is Elz's kermis, the church consecration festival of the parish of Saint John the Baptist (Sankt Johannes der Täufer), held each year on the third weekend in September and counted among the region's biggest folk festivals. On the Friday before the festival, the Kirmesburschen – young men – keep watch over the kermis tree. On the Saturday, the young men of the next age group stand the richly decorated tree near the town hall: the kermis then begins. The festivities last until Tuesday, when the Rausschmiss der Kirmesburschen (roughly "Chucking Out of the Kermis Lads") by the men of the next age group concludes the Elzer Kirmes. Traditionally, the kermis is "buried" on the following Thursday: a straw doll is burnt at the kermis tree after the Kermis Lads’ mourning procession. In 2004, Elz marked the sesquicentenary of its church consecration with an historic festival parade and market.
- Hexenkessel: Since 1994, the Rotjacken ("Redjackets"), who as a subgrouping of the "Kulturkreis Elzer Bürgerhaus" – a local "cultural circle" – are responsible for arranging various Shrovetide ("Fastnacht") events, have been staging a Carnival parade through Elz on Altweiberfastnacht ("Old Women’s Fasting Night" – the Thursday before Ash Wednesday). Groups on foot without motorized vehicles may take part. Every year, it begins at 19:11. The parade route leads through the middle of the community, which is partly decorated by those living along the route at great expense. After the groups have reached the Witch's Fire at Hirtenplatz (square) about an hour and a half later, the festivities go on into the inns and the Bürgerhaus – a community building. Within a few years, this event became well known far beyond Elz's limits and up to 60 groups were taking part in the parade. Over the last few years, the number of participants has dropped somewhat, perhaps as a result of changes made to the parade route in 2007. The event's name, Hexenkessel, is German for "Witch’s Cauldron".

=== Culinary specialities ===
- Elzer Zwetschgenkuchen: The fifth verse of the Elz kermis song runs Quetschekuche soiß än zoart, bäckt mer in Elz die richtig Oart, or in standard High German, Zwetschgenkuchen süß und zart, bäckt man in Elz auf die richtige Art, or indeed in English, "Zwetschge cake sweet and mellow, is baked in Elz in the right way." This describes the regional speciality, which at Elz kermis time in September is well known far beyond the village's limits. The reason for the zwetschge cake's popularity is, among other things, that the fair's end traditionally falls at the same time as the zwetschge harvest also ends. The cake is traditionally prepared on a great oblong baking sheet. The dough is a yeast dough upon which are laid pitted and chopped zwetschgen. In the preparation, the grounds for choosing zwetschgen over plums can be seen. Plums would give off too much moisture while baking and would soak the cake. The Zwetschgenkuchen is eaten with whipped cream at afternoon coffee time.

== Economy and infrastructure ==
The community is home to more than 600 businesses with well over 2,000 jobs. A commercial park can be found on Bundesstraße 8 towards the outlying centre of Malmeneich.

=== Transport links ===
==== Road transport ====
The community is also known countrywide for its Elzer Berg (mountain) on the notable drop in elevation from the Lower Westerwald into the Limburg Basin. This long sloped stretch of roadway on the A 3 (Cologne–Frankfurt) near kilometre 100 going towards Frankfurt is a notorious accident black spot. The speed limit of 100 km/h for passenger cars and 40 km/h for trucks has watch kept over it by stationary speed measuring apparatus.

Through Elz runs Bundesstraße 8, on its way from the Dutch border to Passau. As traffic regularly backs up here, the plan for the long-distance federal roads has identified a bypass for Elz as an urgent need; the price for such work will be €12,600,000.

==== Rail transport ====
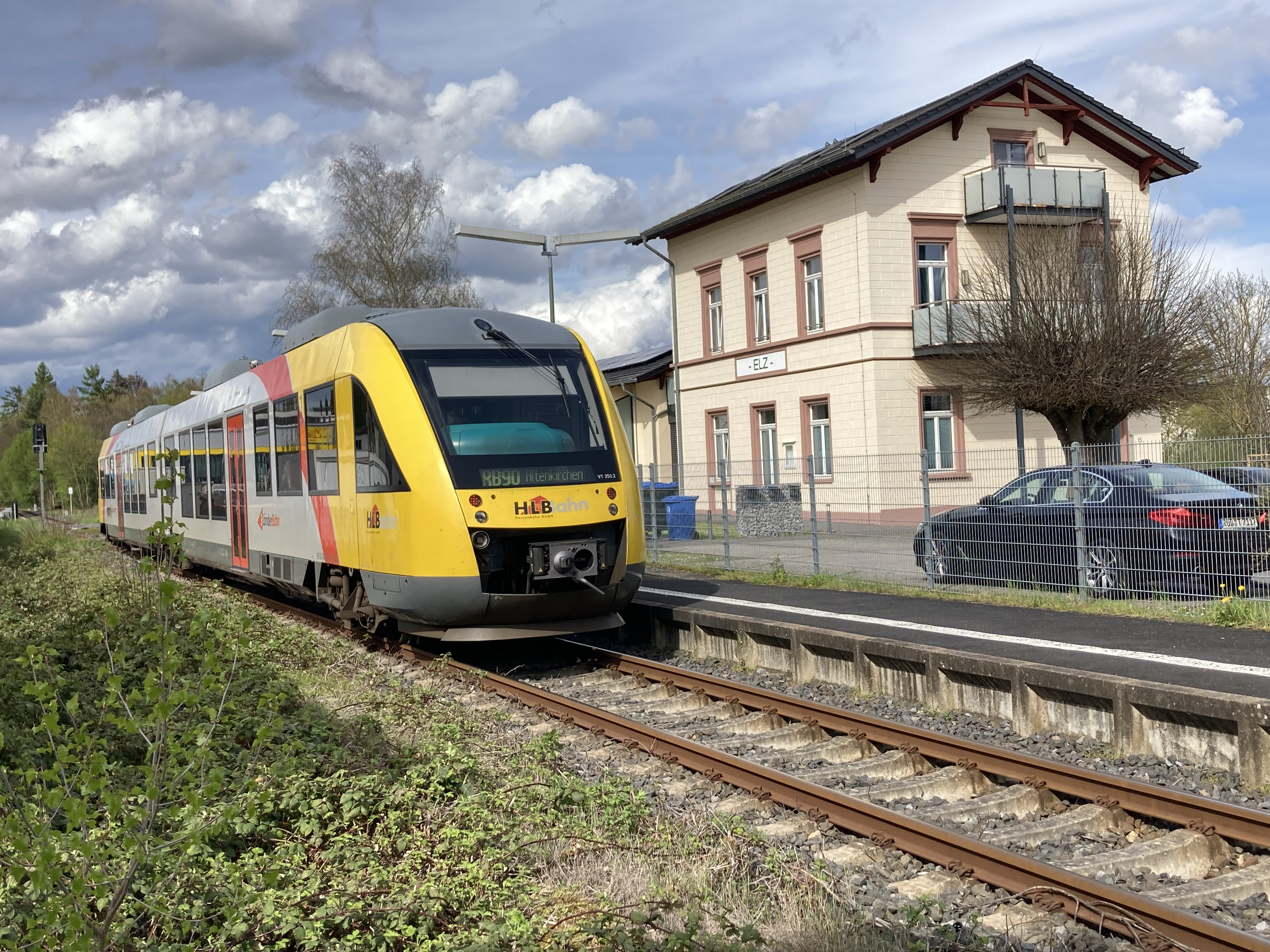
Elz train station (RB90)

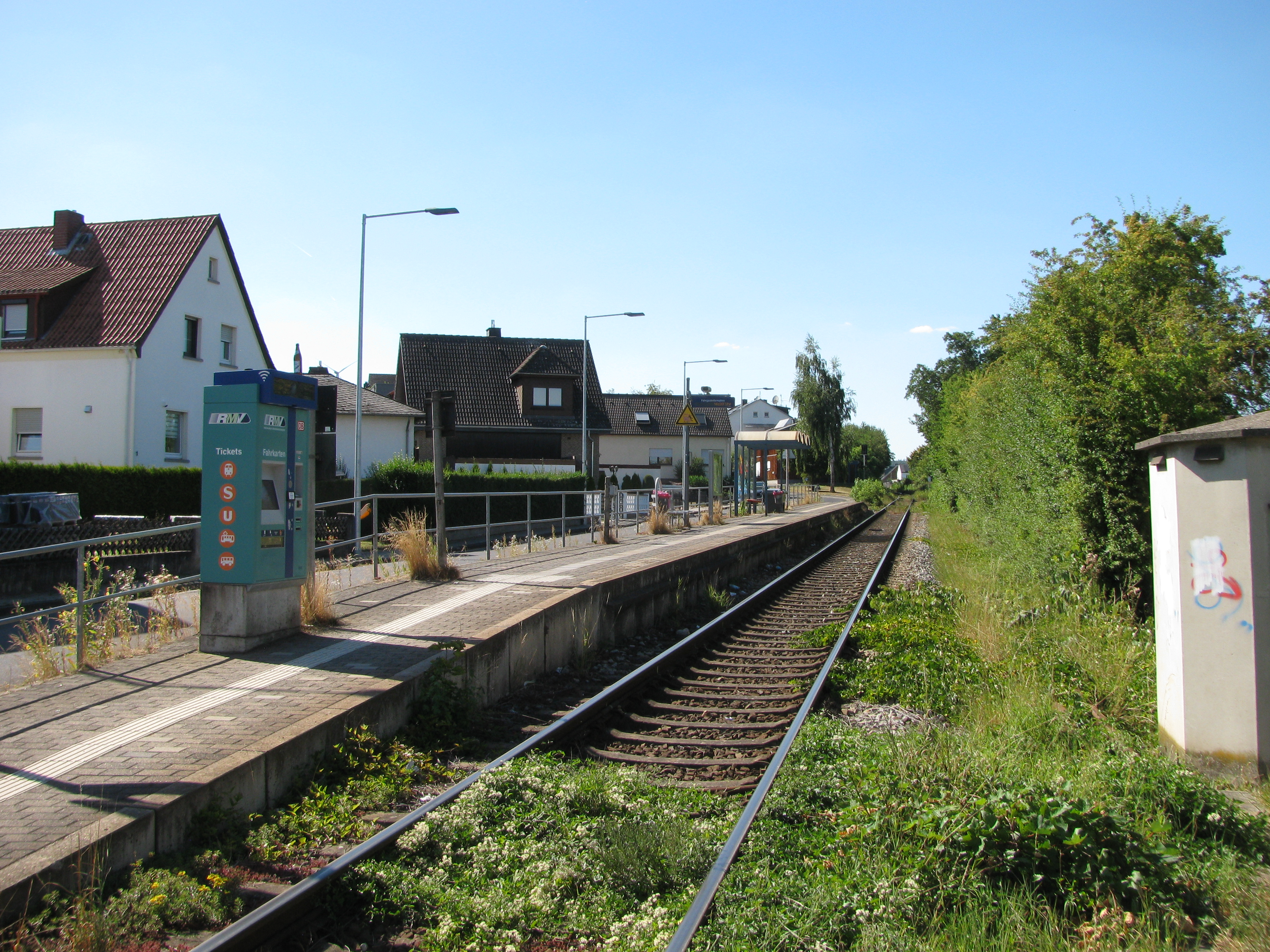
Elz Süd stop

Elz has two railway stations: near the middle of the community is found Elz station on the Westerwald-Sieg-Bahn (Westerwald-Sieg-Raulway), RB90 from Limburg via Diez Ost, Westerburg, Hachenburg, Altenkirchen, Au (Sieg) and Wissen to Siegen. From the regional station at Limburg, the cities of Gießen, Koblenz, Frankfurt am Main and Wiesbaden may be reached directly. Furthermore, Elz is linked to the Limburg-Staffel–Siershahn line (Lower Westerwald Railway/(RB29), Unterwesterwaldbahn), which runs from Limburg via Diez Ost and Montabaur to Siershahn, through a stop, Elz Süd. Both stations are served by Hessische Landesbahn, section DreiLänderBahn.

Elz station has a Bike and ride facility and a Park and ride parking lot as well.

Elz is located in the zone number 6008 of the transport association Rhein-Main-Verkehrsverbund (RMV) as well as the zone number 171 of the transport association Verkehrsverbund Rhein-Mosel (VRM).

The nearest InterCityExpress stop is Limburg Süd station on the Cologne-Frankfurt high-speed rail line. Alternatively, Montabaur station on the same railway line may be reached on the Unterwesterwaldbahn.

==== Bus transport ====
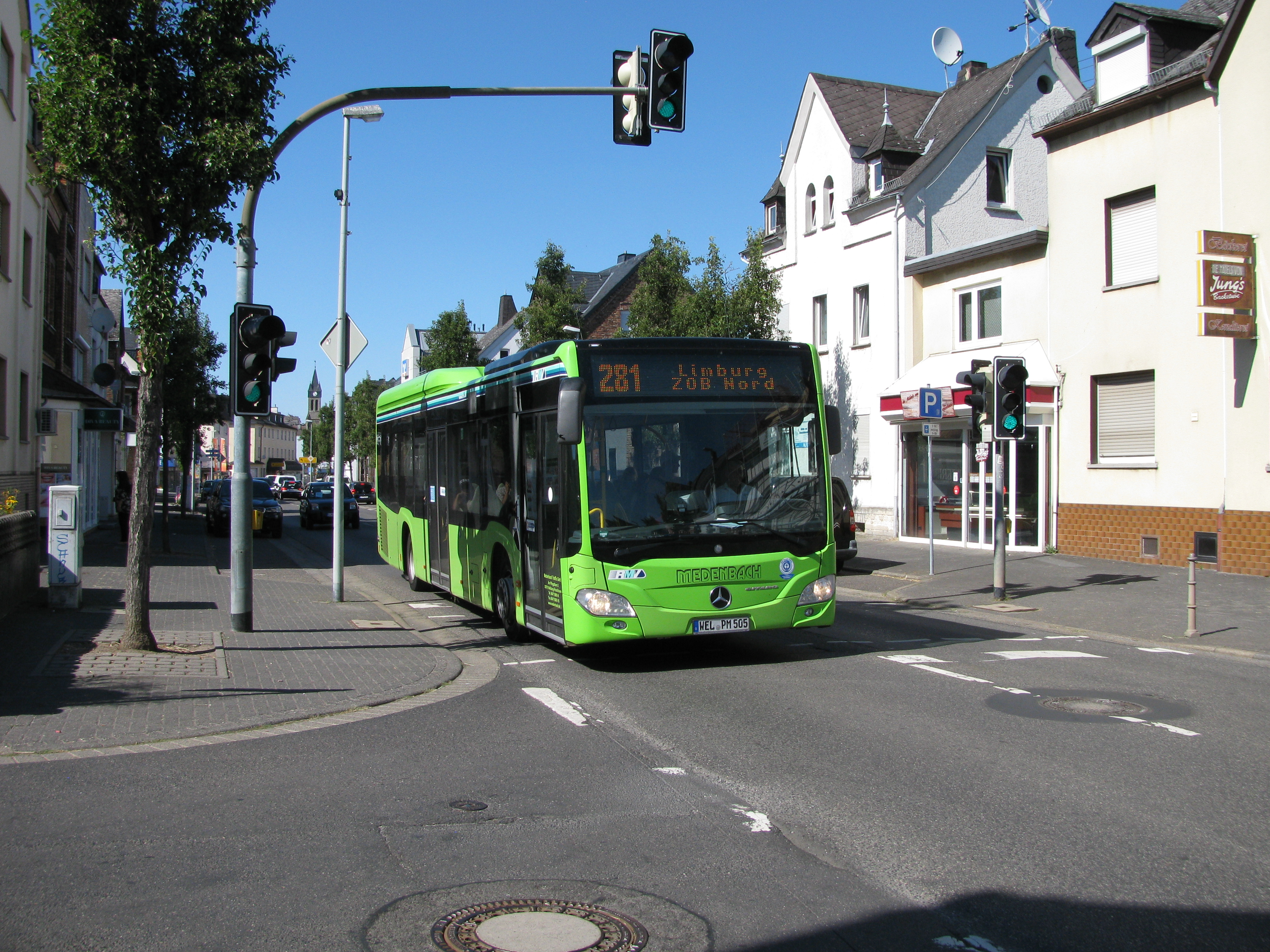
Local bus on Elz main road

Local busses serve Elz. The village is located on the area of the Rhein-Main-Verkehrsverbund (RMV).

==== Air transport ====
It is roughly a 65-km drive to Frankfurt Airport on Bundesautobahn 3. Elz has its own airport at its disposal which is also home to Flugsportgruppe Elz e. V., a sport flying club.

=== Public facilities ===
Elz has a big outdoor swimming pool with broad outdoor facilities (table tennis table, volleyball field, basketball nets). Right next to it are found the central sporting ground and the tennis courts. The community also offers three sport halls: the Vereinsturnhalle ("club gymnasium"), the Süd-Schule Elz gymnasium (school) and since 30 May 2008 the Erlenbachhalle, a two-field sport hall belonging to the Erlenbachschule (school) on Hadamarer Straße.

There are two homes for the elderly in Elz that look after elderly residents and those in need of care.

=== Education ===
Elz has at its disposal three kindergartens, St. Martin, Unterm Regenbogen and Lollipop, the primary school Oranienschule (formerly known as Grundschule Elz Süd), and also the Erlenbachschule, which functions as a primary school, a Hauptschule and a Realschule.

=== Public institutions ===
- Kindergarten of the Catholic parish of Elz "St. Martin", Kolpingstraße (Elz-Süd)
- Municipal kindergarten "Unterm Regenbogen", Musikantenring (Fleckenberg)
- Municipal kindergarten "Lollipop", Pfortenstraße (downtown)
- Kinderkrippe Mary Poppins Elz (daycare), Limburger Straße
- Schülerganztagsbetreuung (all-day care) sponsored by Schulverein der Erlenbachschule Elz e.V.
- Elz Volunteer Fire Brigade, founded 1889 (includes Youth Fire Brigade, founded 1972)
- Malmeneich Volunteer Fire Brigade, founded 1957 (includes Youth Fire Brigade, founded 2006)

=== Energy production ===
The wind park Elz produces electricity through six wind turbines.

== Famous people ==
=== Sons and daughters of the town ===
- Theodor Blank (b. 19 September 1905, d. 14 May 1972 in Bonn), German politician (CDU), Member of the Bundestag, Member of the North Rhine-Westphalia Landtag, Federal Defence Minister (1955–1956) and Federal Minister for Labour and Social Order (1957–1965)
- Joseph Blank (b. 12 February 1913, d. 14 June 1994 in Düsseldorf), German politician (CDU), Member of the North Rhine-Westphalia Landtag, State Minister for State Planning, Housing Building and Public Works (1962–1963)
