= Obererbach, Westerwaldkreis =

Obererbach
- Municipality
- Coat of arms

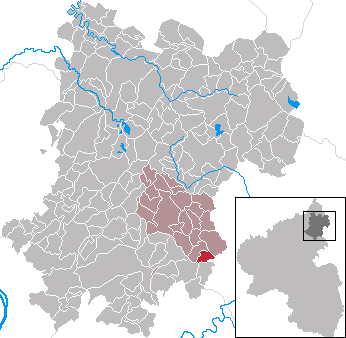
- Location of Obererbach within Westerwaldkreis district
- Interactive map of Obererbach
- Location within Germany Location within Rhineland-Palatinate
- Coordinates: 50°26′33″N 07°58′00″E
- Country: Germany
- State: Rhineland-Palatinate
- District: Westerwaldkreis
- Municipal assoc.: Wallmerod

Government
  - Mayor (2019–24): Martin Schönfeld

Area
  - Total: 2.60 km^{2} (1.00 sq mi)
- Elevation: 240 m (790 ft)

Population (2025-12-31)
  - Total: 505
  - Density: 194/km^{2} (503/sq mi)
- Time zone: UTC+01:00 (CET)
  - Summer (DST): UTC+02:00 (CEST)
- Postal codes: 56414
- Dialling codes: 06435
- Vehicle registration: WW
- Website: www.obererbach.eu

Obererbach is an Ortsgemeinde – a community belonging to a Verbandsgemeinde – in the Westerwaldkreis in Rhineland-Palatinate, Germany.

== Geography ==
The community lies in the Westerwald between Montabaur and Limburg an der Lahn. It belongs to the Verbandsgemeinde of Wallmerod, a kind of collective municipality. Its seat is in the like-named town.

== History ==
In 1290, Obererbach had its first documentary mention as Erlebach.

== Politics ==
The municipal council is made up of 12 council members who were elected in a majority vote in a municipal election on 13 June 2004.

== Economy and infrastructure ==
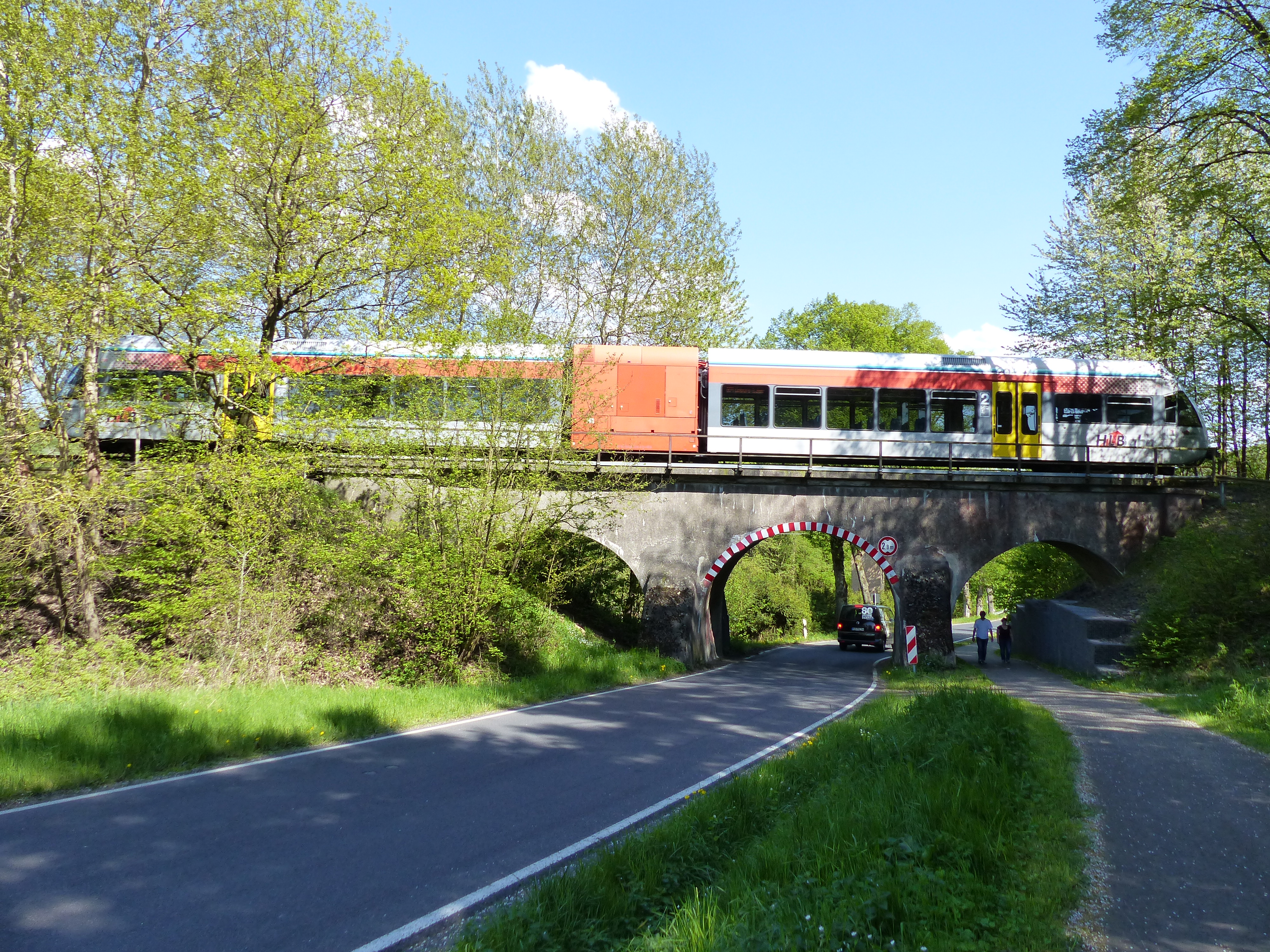
RB29 train passes Obererbach without a stop

Obererbach is served by the local bus line 482 and located in the area of the transport association Verkehrsverbund Rhein-Mosel (VRM), in the fare zone 423. Running right through the community is Kreisstraße 160, which joins Bundesstraße 8 in Malmeneich. The nearest train stop is in Dreikirchen at the Lower Westerwald railway (RB29). The nearest Autobahn interchange is Montabaur on the A 3 (Cologne–Frankfurt), some 7 km away. The nearest InterCityExpress stop is the railway station at Montabaur on the Cologne-Frankfurt high-speed rail line.
