= Staffel station =

Railway station in Limburg, Hesse, Germany

Staffel
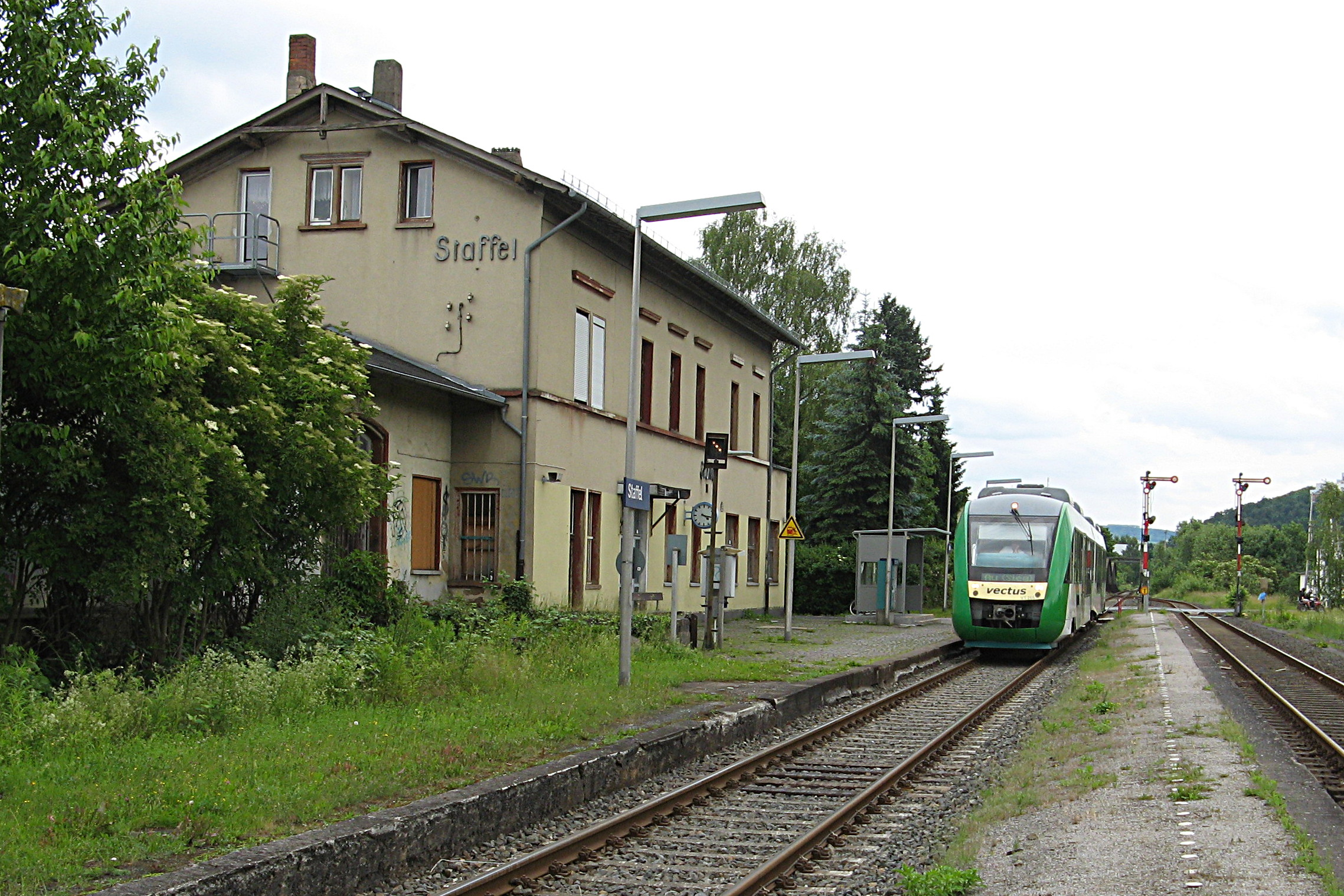

General information
- Location: Am Bahnhof 9, Limburg, Hesse; Germany
- Coordinates: 50°23′58″N 8°02′47″E
- Lines: Limburg-Staffel–Siershahn (0.0 km); Limburg–Altenkirchen (5.3 km)
- Platforms: 1

Construction
- Accessible: Yes
- Architect: Heinrich Velde

Other information
- Station code: 5962
- DS100 code: FST
- IBNR: 8005668
- Category: 6
- Fare zone: : 6001; VRM: 171 (RMV transitional tariff)
- Website: www.bahnhof.de

History
- Opened: 1 January 1870; 156 years ago

Services
Preceding station	Hessische Landesbahn	Following station
Elz Süd towards Siershahn	RB 29	Diez Ost towards Limburg (Lahn)
Elz towards Siegen Hbf	RB 90	Diez Ost towards Limburg (Lahn)
Location

Staffel station (also called Limburg-Staffel) is a heritage-listed station in the Limburg district of Staffel in the German state of Hesse. The Limburg-Staffel–Siershahn railway branches off the Limburg–Altenkirchen railway at the station.

== Station building ==
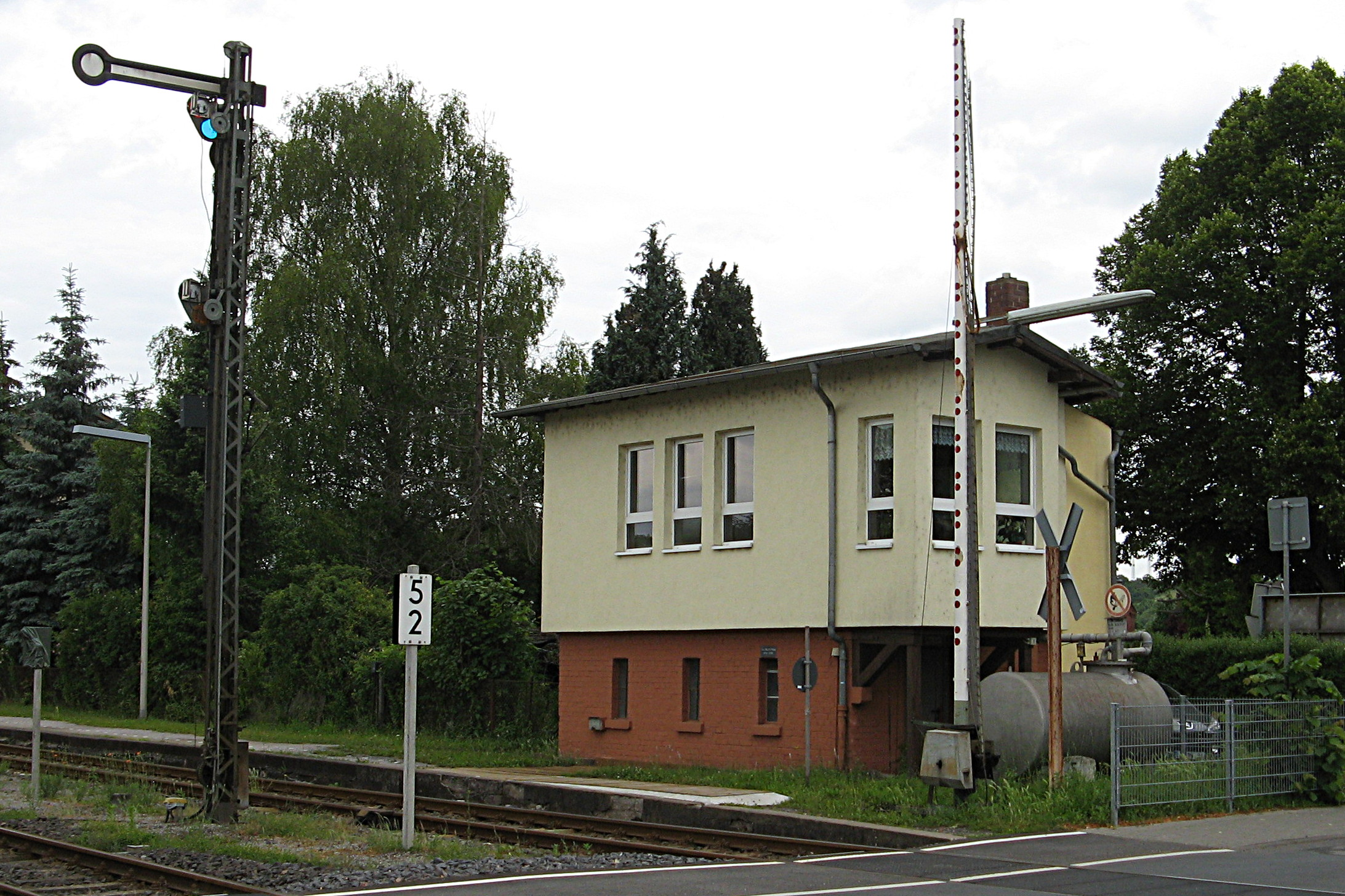
Staffel station: southern signal box

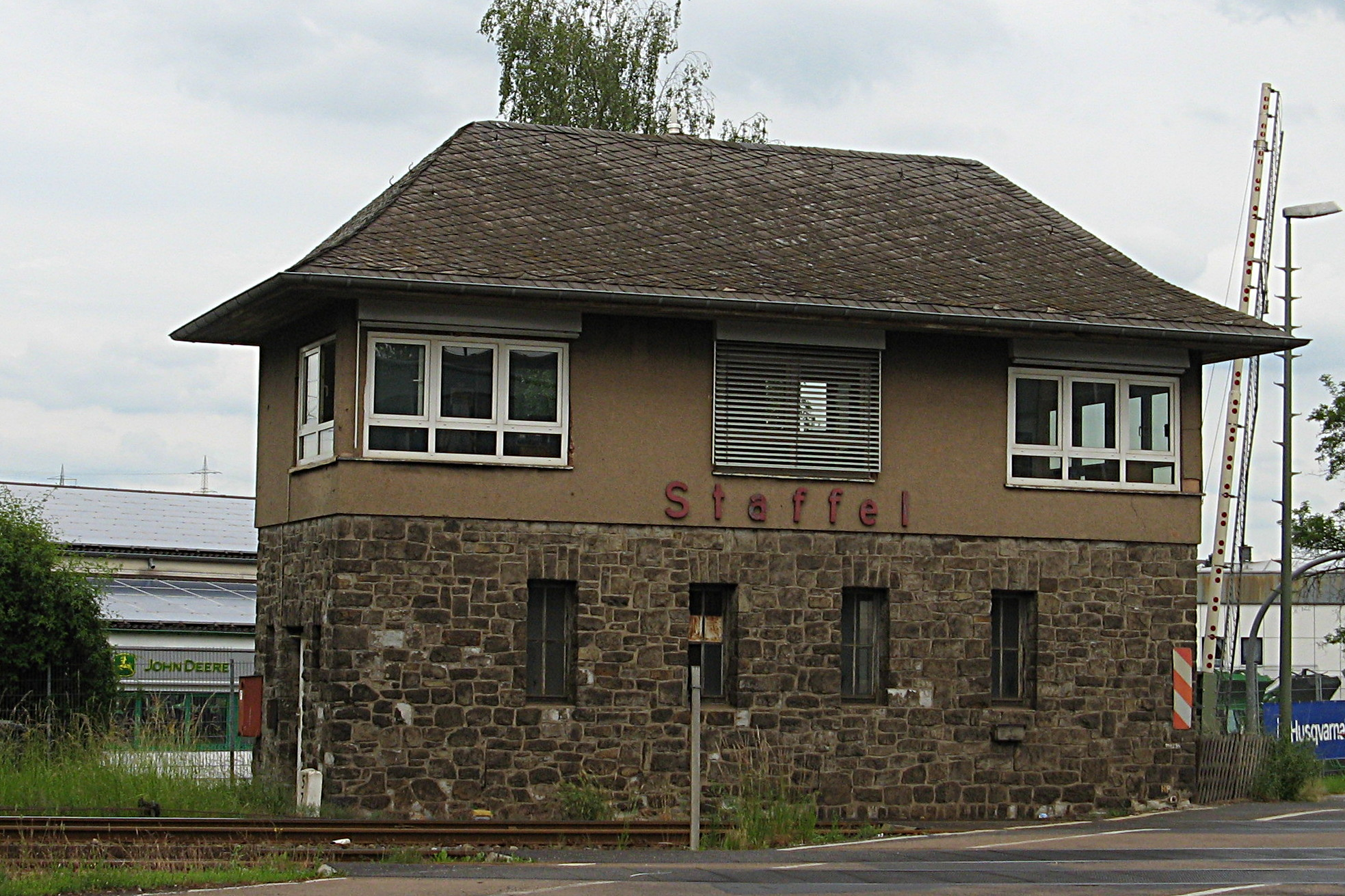
Staffel station: northern signal box

The station building was built in 1870 during the construction of the Limburg–Westerburg section of the Limburg–Altenkirchen railway (also called the Upper Westerwald Railway). The architect of the two-storey plaster building was probably Heinrich Velde. The neo-classical building is east of the tracks and originally had five parallel portals, but it was subsequently extended to the south. On the side facing the town it has a gable dormer.

To the north there is a low, plastered goods shed supported by timber trusses. A signal box built in 1890 for the Limburg-Staffel–Siershahn railway (also called the Lower Westerwald Railway) can also be seen. This small building has a ground storey built of brick, while the signal box floor is cantilevered and provided with large windows.

About 250 metres north of the station is another signal box built in 1925, also for the Lower Westerwald Railway. It is a small building with a brick ground floor, plastered first floor and a hip roof.

== History ==
The section of the Upper Westerwald Railway between Staffel and Hadamar was opened on 1 January 1870 and the Lower Westerwald Railway was opened on 30 May 1884. The laying of a second track on the original section between Staffel and Limburg was completed on 10 December 1888, after the section from Hadamar to Westerburg had already been opened in October 1886.

== Operations ==
Staffel station is located in the network of the Rhein-Main-Verkehrsverbund (Rhine-Main Transport Association, RMV). The station is a stop on Regionalbahn services RB 29 and RB 90. Both services run every two hours every day. Additional services run in the weekday peak hour. Staffel thus has rail links to Diez, Elz, Hadamar, Dornburg, Westerburg, Altenkirchen, Au (Sieg), Montabaur and Siershahn, as well as central Limburg. The trip to Limburg takes 7 minutes.

Train class	Route	Frequency
RB 29 Unterwesterwaldbahn	Limburg (Lahn) – Diez Ost – Staffel – Montabaur – Siershahn	Hourly
RB 90 (Westerwald-Sieg-Bahn)	Siegen Hbf – Betzdorf – Au (Sieg) – Altenkirchen (Westerw) – Hachenburg – Nistertal-Bad Marienberg – Westerburg – Staffel – Diez Ost – Limburg (Lahn)	Hourly; every 2 hours on weekend
