= Malmeneich =

Village in Hesse, Germany

Coordinates: 50°26′27″N 7°59′52″E

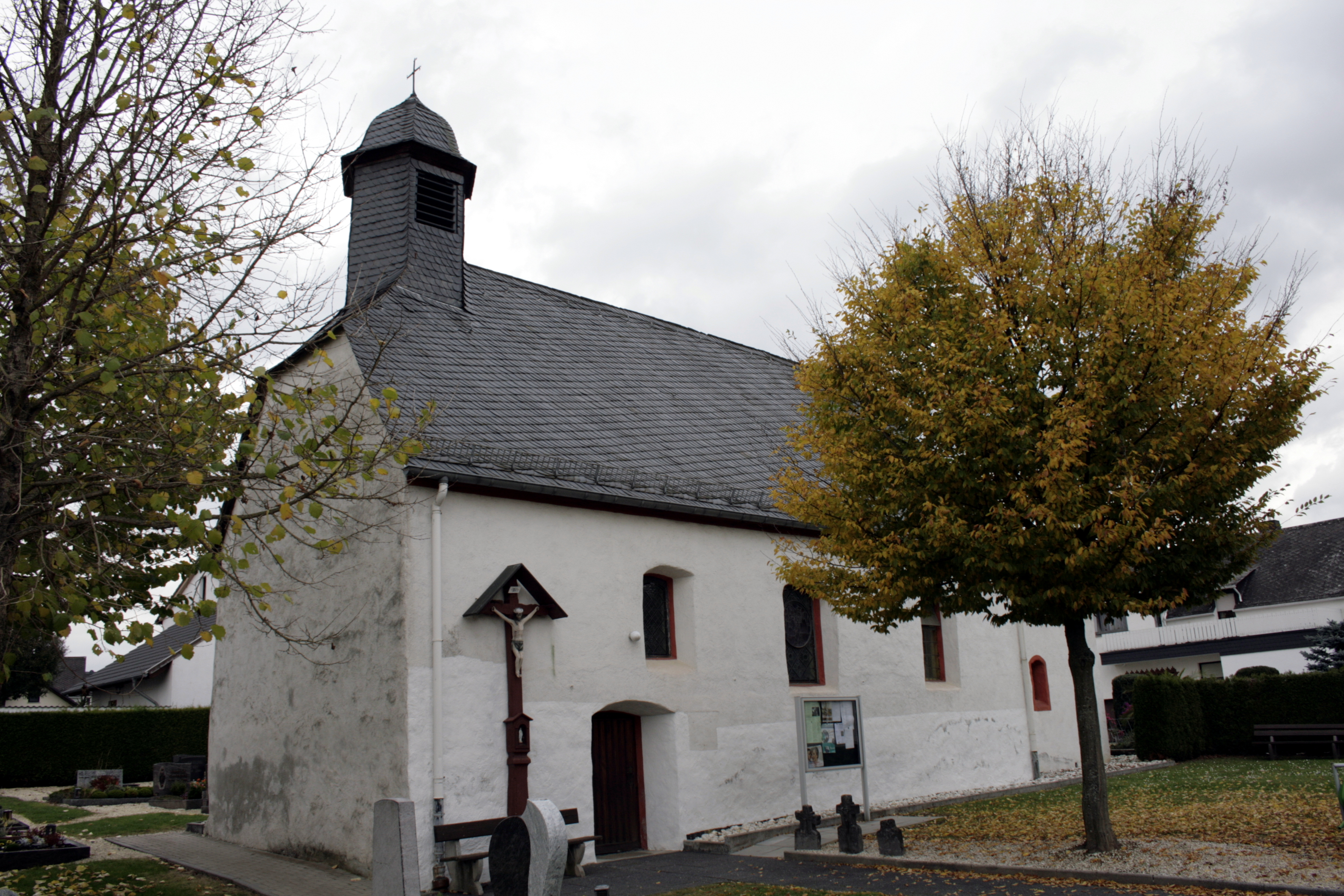
Chapel

Malmeneich is a village in Hesse, Germany. It belongs to the municipality of Elz. Its post code is 65604 and its dialing code is 06433. It has 345 inhabitants.

== Geography and climate ==
Malmeneich lies in the Westerwald. Its average elevation is 250 m above sea level. The highest point lies in the forest and is 292 m high. The average temperature is 9,9 °C and it rains 700–720 mm a year. Though this seems moderate, temperatures can vary between −20 °C and 35 °C.

== Malmeneich and the media ==
There was an entry about Malmeneich in the Hessian television in 2002. This was for a project of hr3 which aimed to report about Hessian villages with less than 1,000 inhabitants.

Every year Malmeneich is mentioned in the regional newspaper because of the "Malmeneicher Kirmes".

At the European elections in 2005 there was a crime in Malmeneich. A citizen went to elect five times. He got judged and this crime went through the regional media.
