= Staffel–Siershahn railway =

German railway line

Overview
- Line number: 3071
- Locale: Rhineland-Palatinate, Hesse, Germany

Service
- Route number: 629

Technical
- Line length: 29.8 km (18.5 mi)
- Track gauge: 1,435 mm (4 ft 8 1/2 in) standard gauge
- Operating speed: 50 km/h (31.1 mph) (maximum)

The Staffel–Siershahn railway is a railway line between Staffel, Montabaur and Siershahn in the Westerwald. The line, which is also known as the Unterwesterwaldbahn (Lower Westerwald Railway), runs through the German states of Rhineland-Palatinate and Hesse.

== History ==
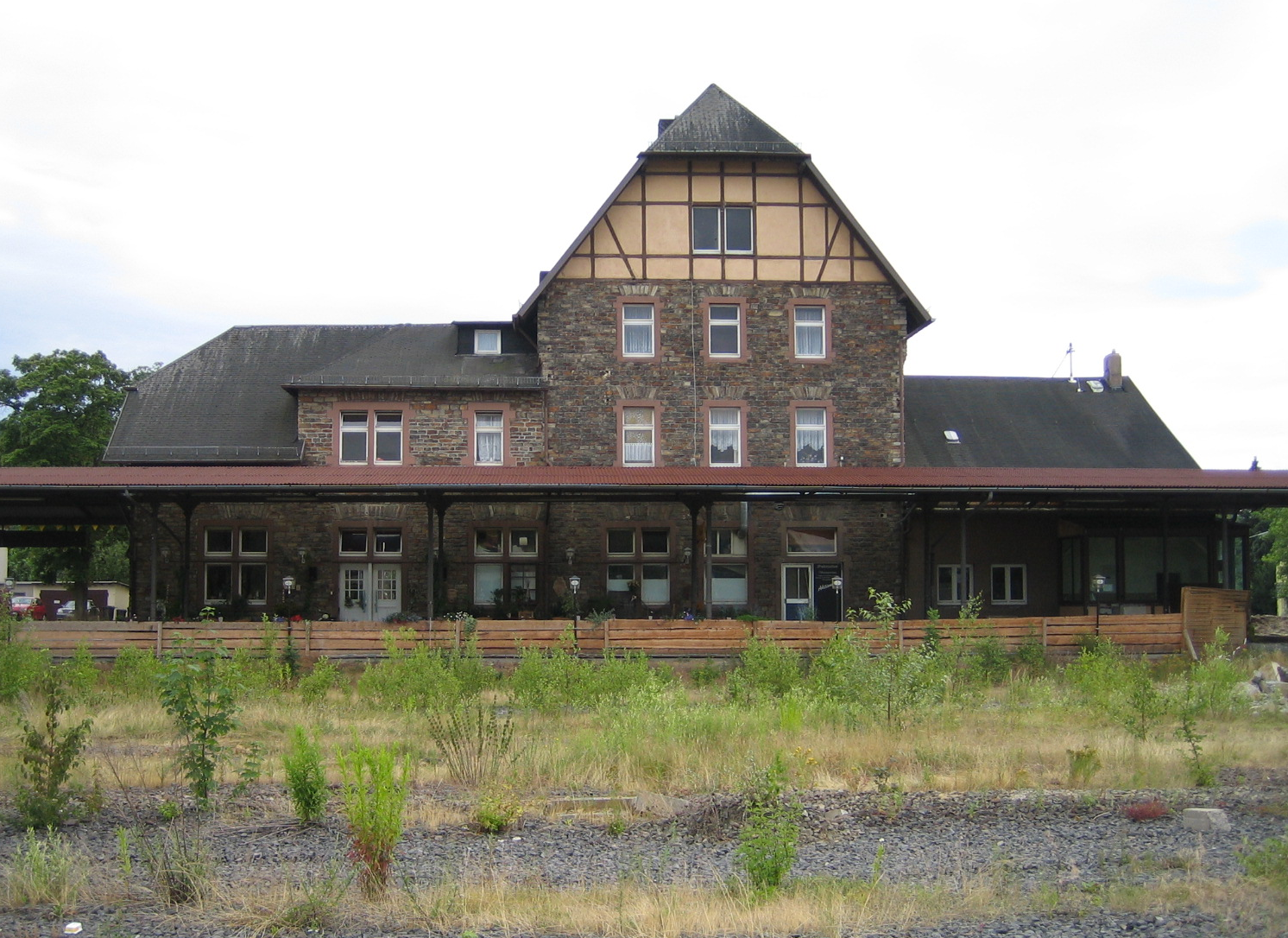
Former Montabaur station (2005)

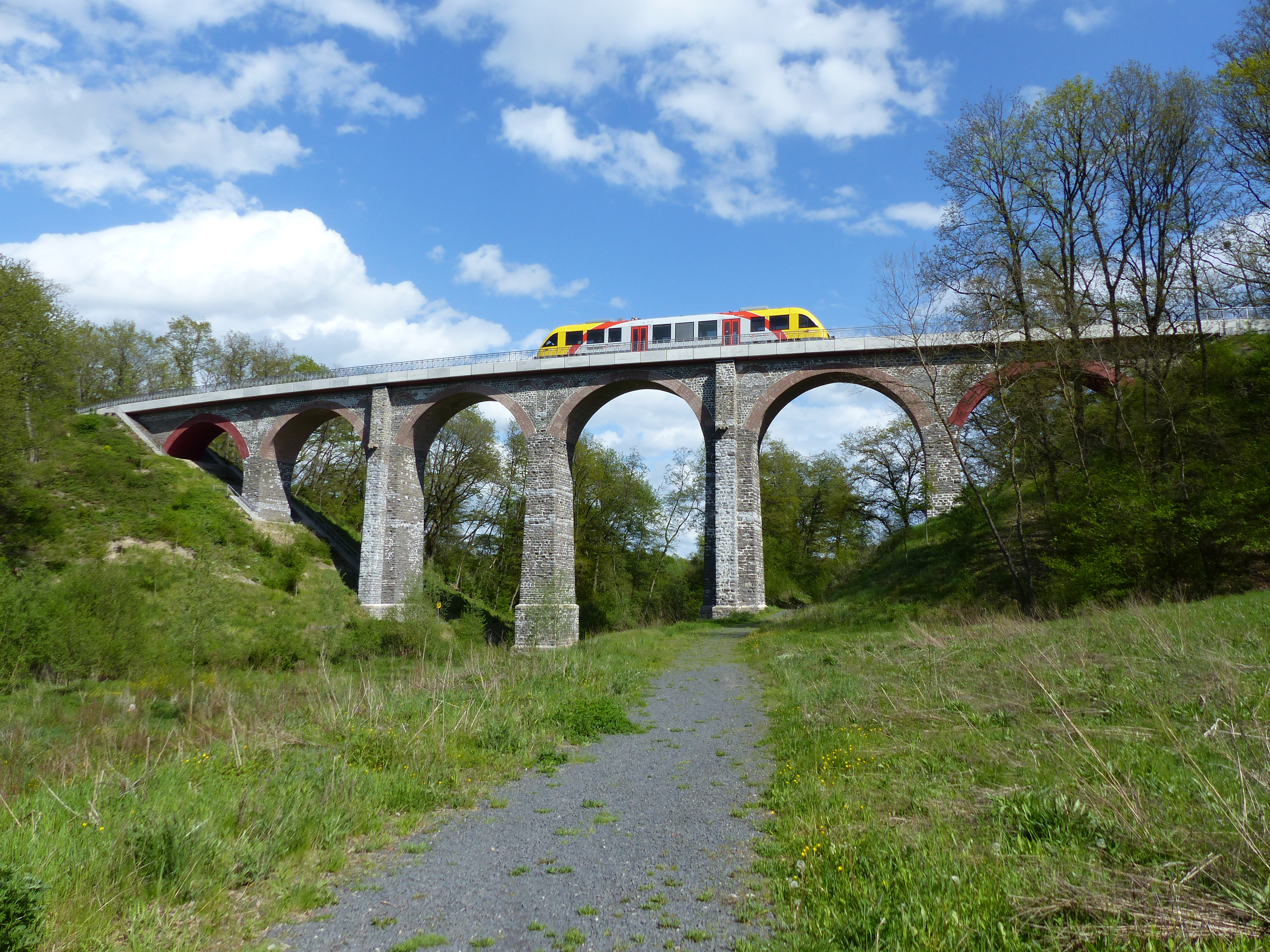
Listed building Sandbachtal bridge close to Niedererbach with a passing RB29 train

The Rhenish Railway Company (Rheinische Eisenbahn-Gesellschaft, RhE) planned the line and also received the concession to build it. It was opened to Staffel on 30 May 1884, by which time the Prussian state railways had taken over operations of the RhE. The Prussian government took control of the RhE on 1 January 1886.

The Lower Westerwald Railway connected to the Hadamar–Limburg line in Staffel. The Lower Westerwald Railway connected with the Brexbach Valley Railway (Brexbachtalbahn), which connected to the East Rhine Railway (Rechte Rheinstrecke) in Siershahn.

In 2017 intensive renovation works took place at Sandbachtal-bridge near Niedererbach stop to conserve it, which is a listed building. Four million Euros have been invested.

== Operations ==
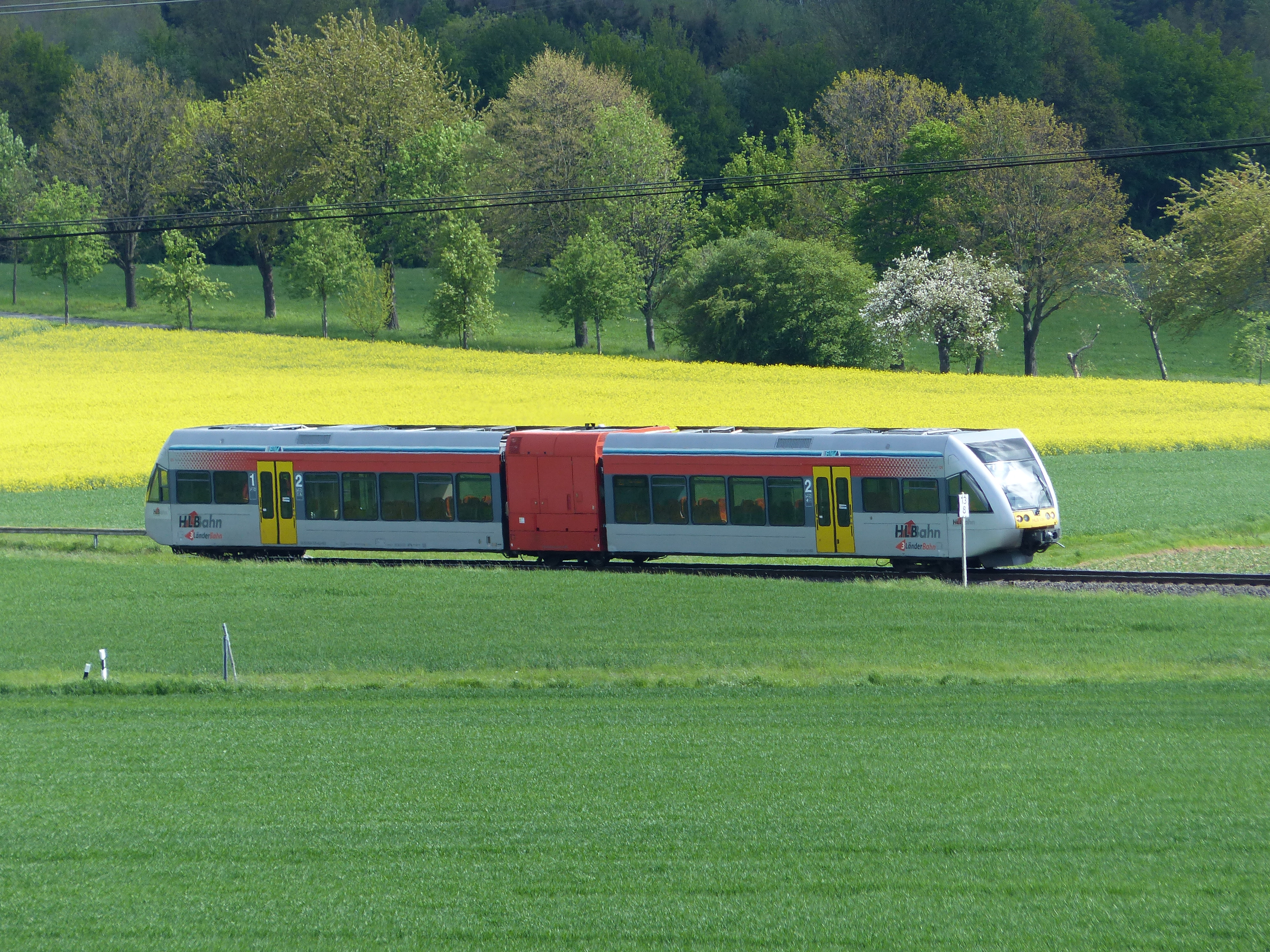
RB29 on a field close to Girod

While the Deutsche Bundesbahn ceased passenger services on the Holzbach Valley Railway on 1 June 1984, it continued to operate services on the Lower Westerwald Railway. From 12 December 2004 to August 2015, services were operated by Vectus Verkehrsgesellschaft every hour or every two hours using LINT diesel multiple units. SPNV Nord announced on 31 October 2012 that Hessische Landesbahn (HLB) had been awarded the contract to operate the Unterwesterwaldbahn (Lower Westerwald Railway) from August 2015 to December 2030. As part of a necessary transition plan, HLB, Regionalbereich DreiLänderBahn (Three-Country Railway Regional Division), brought forward the start of operations for the RB 29 Regionalbahn service to the 2014 timetable change, particularly since the rolling stock from Vectus was also transferred to HLB. Since then, the RB 29 regional train service has operated on an irregular hourly schedule, with gaps in service, especially on weekends.

The modern Montabaur station was opened in 2002 to provide interchange with the Cologne-Frankfurt high-speed railway.

Due to an accident at a level crossing near Girod on 30 September 2011, the line was severely damaged over a length of 7 km to Montabaur. During the period required for its repair, a steam-hauled freight train of the Hanau railway museum (Museumseisenbahn Hanau) railway ran over the Taunus to Steinefrenz station to supply the concrete sleepers. After the restoration of the line, services were resumed on 19 October 2011.

In 2018, the railroad crossing Freikirchen Torstraße / Bahnstraße to Dreikirchen industrial area has been renewed and barriers equipped and acoustic warning signals installed after the railroad crossing at the Dreikirchen stop already has been equipped done.

=== Stations ===
==== Staffel ====
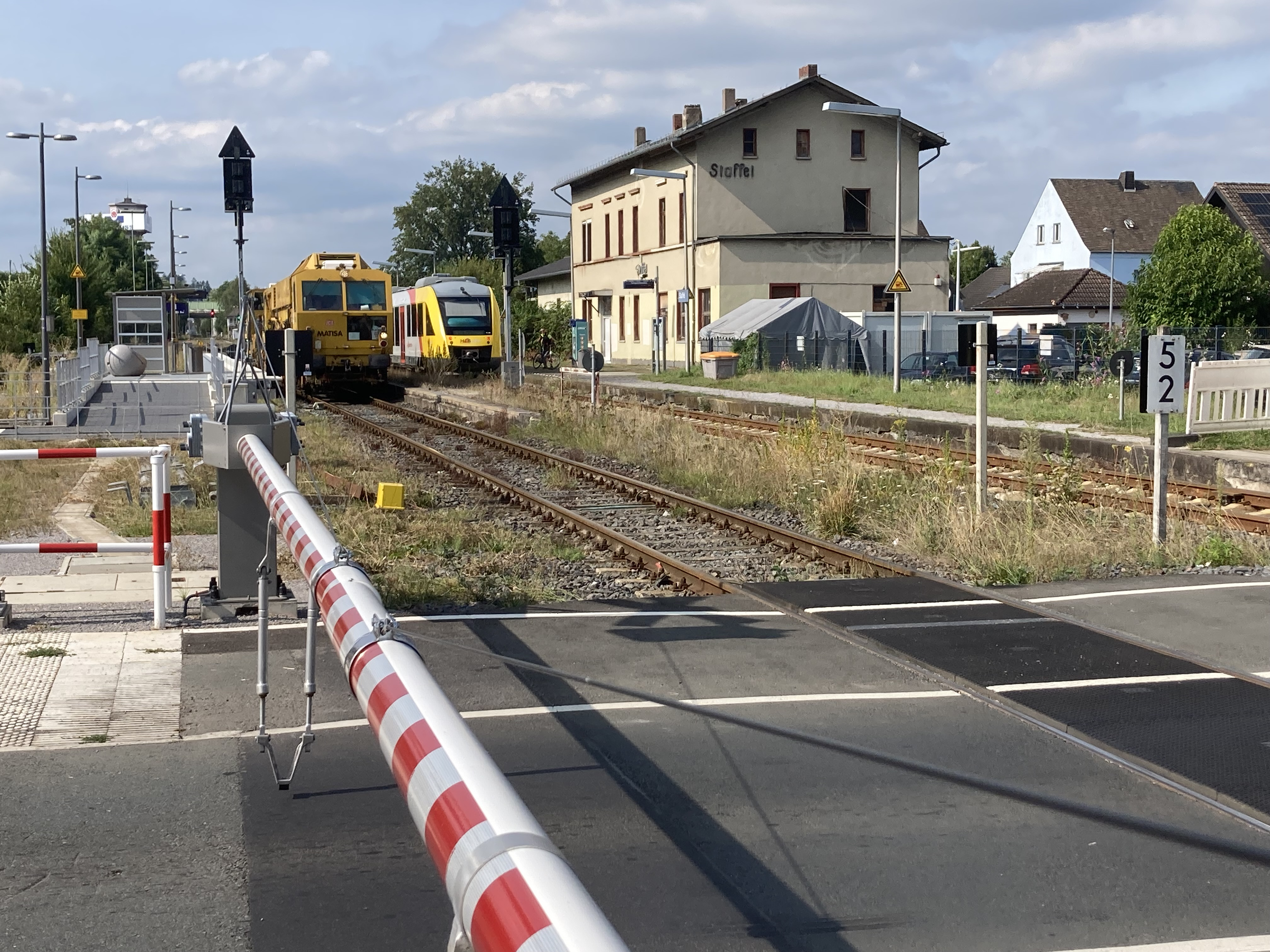
Staffel station, new barrier free platform (left), railroad crossing Koblenzer st. ahead

Located in the Staffel district of the city of Limburg an der Lahn near the bridge over the river Lahn, the natural boder of the Westerwald and the Taunus. Interchange of RB29 and RB90 and local busses.

==== Elz Süd ====
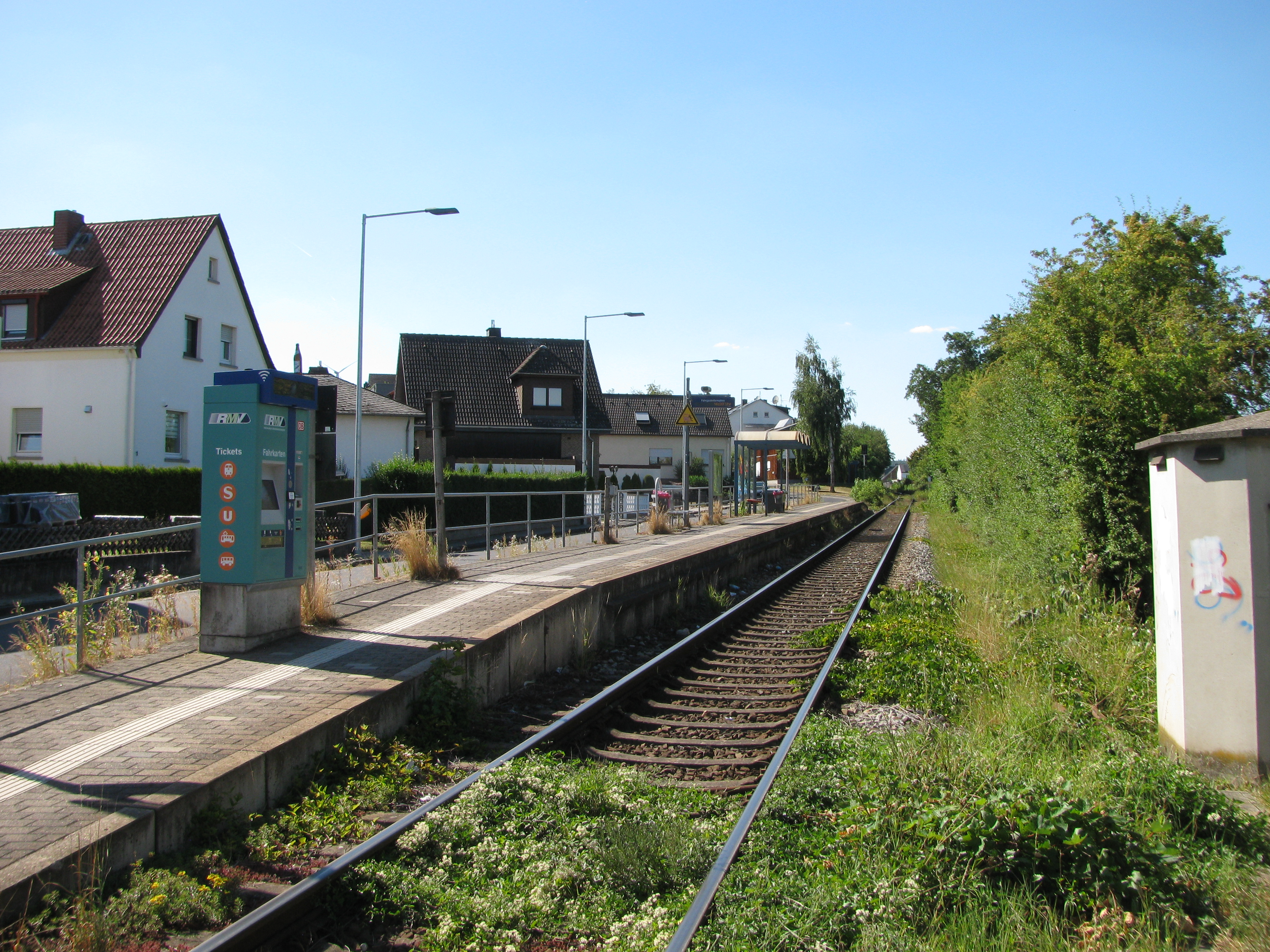
Elz Süd stop

A simple stop that gives Els also a connection to the RB29.

==== Niedererbach ====
The new stop is located at the edge of the village (because of the topography) at the highway to Görgeshausen, a Bike and ride facility is there, opposite to most stops along the line.

==== Dreikirchen ====
The stop is located between the formerly two villages Pütschbach and Oberhausen.

==== Steinefrenz ====
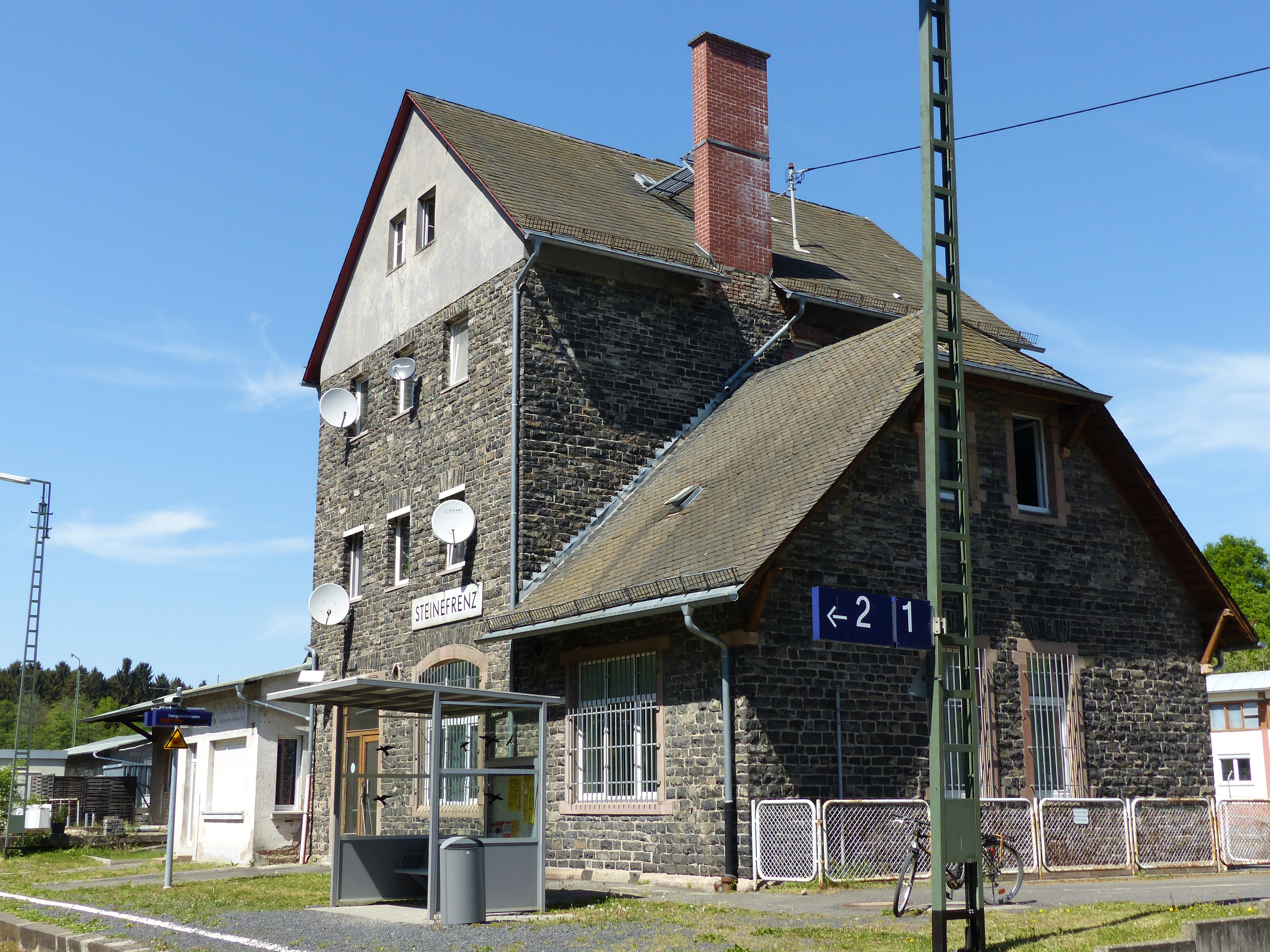
Steinefrenz station and station building

The station used to have a mechanical signalbox, which has been closed. Until the opening of the Cross Westerwald railway and the opening of the train station in Wallmerod, Steinefrenz station has been named "Wallmerod".

==== Girod ====
A simple stop on the field between Girod, Grossholbach and Steinefrenz, frequently problems of vandalism because of its location.

==== Goldhausen ====
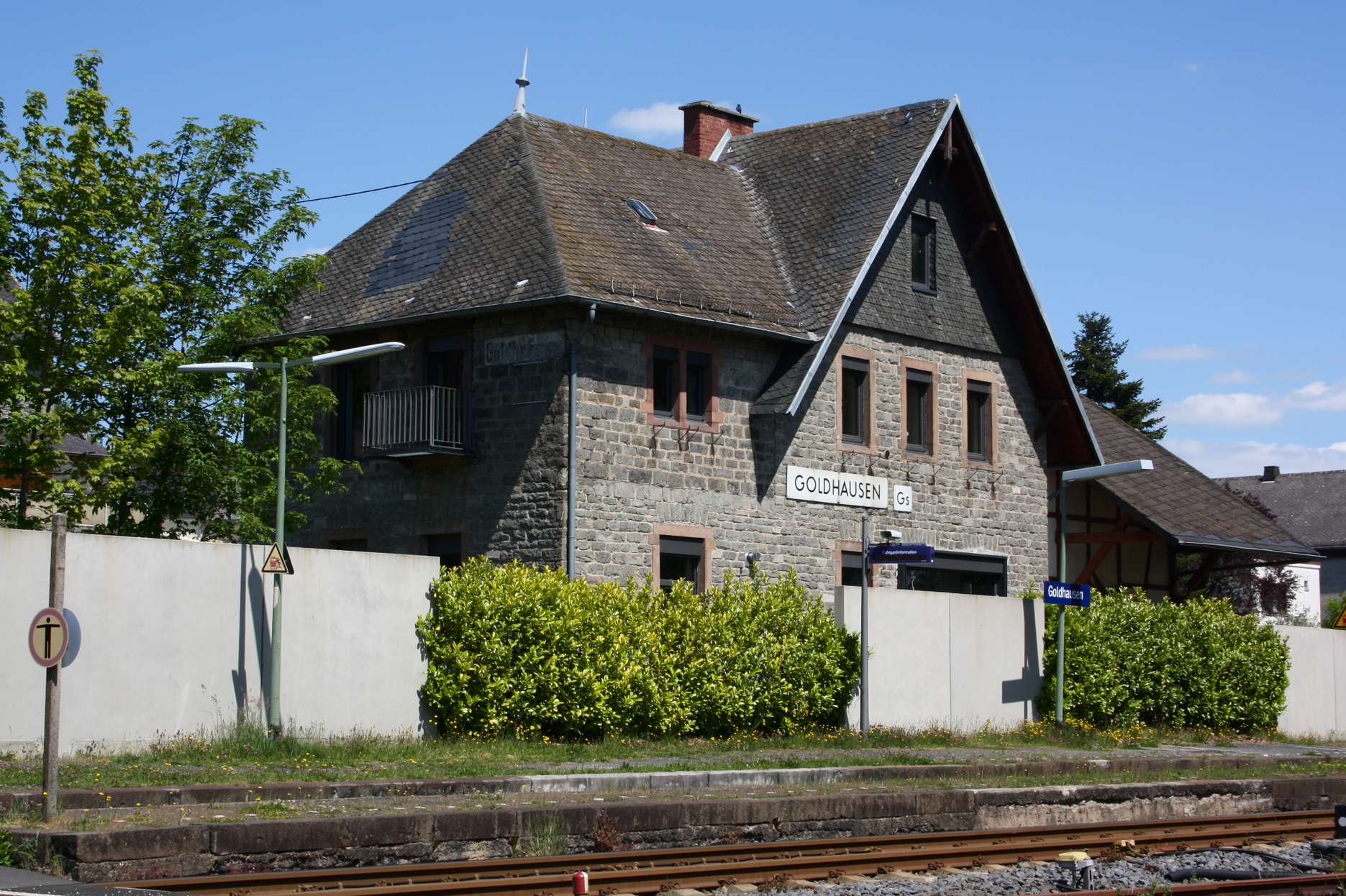
Goldhausen

Train station in the village named Ruppach-Goldhausen near Heiligenroth, unless Steinefrenz station, also Goldhausen station had a signalbox. Most important function was loading clay of the surrounding mines, although nowadays it is only in operation for passenger train service. The reception building was sold and is in private ownership.

==== Montabaur ====
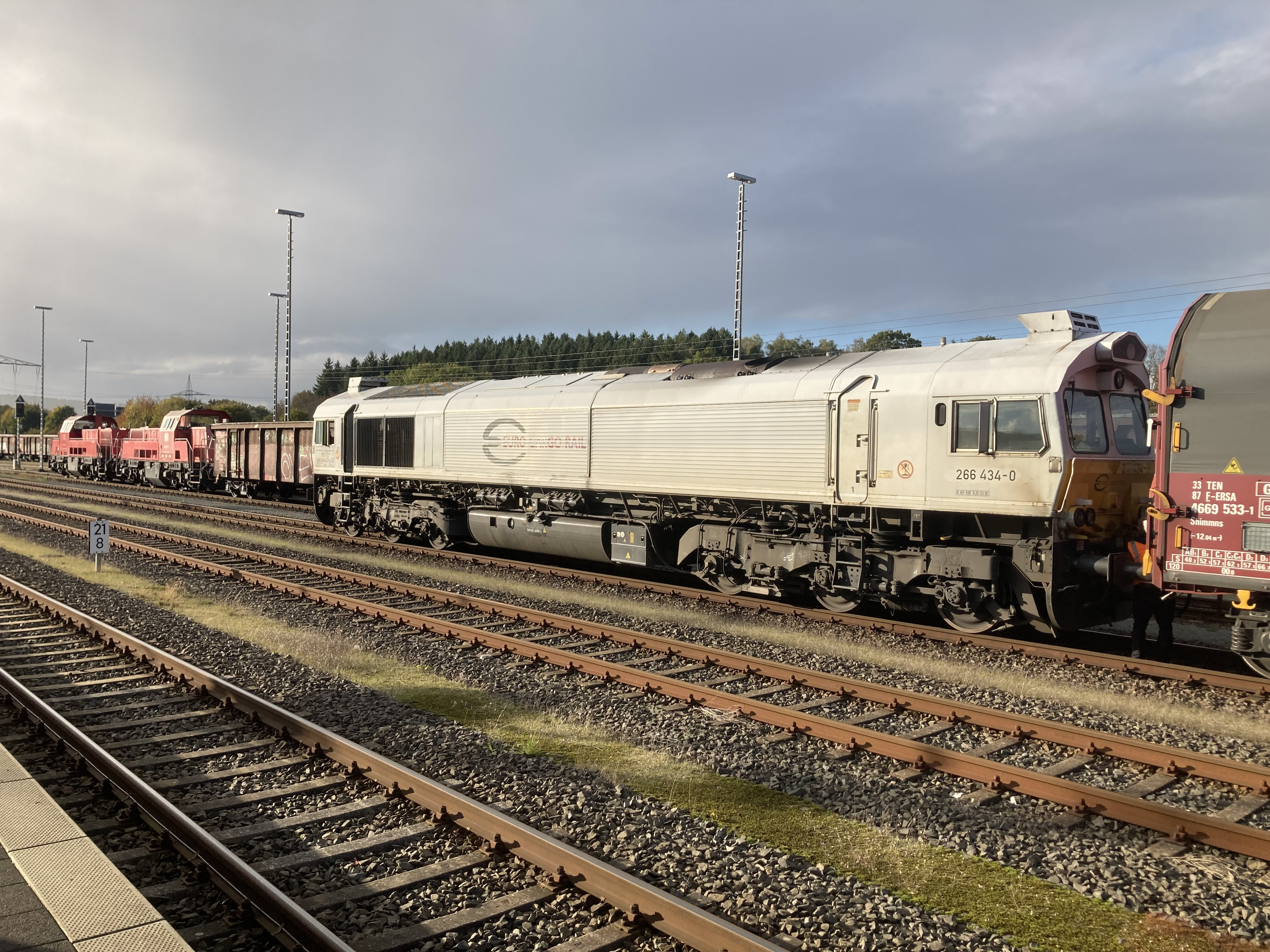
Platform no. 5 in the new Montabaur station is used for the trains of the Staffel–Siershahn railway, the background tracks also for the trains of the Cross Westerwald railway in direction of Wallmerod

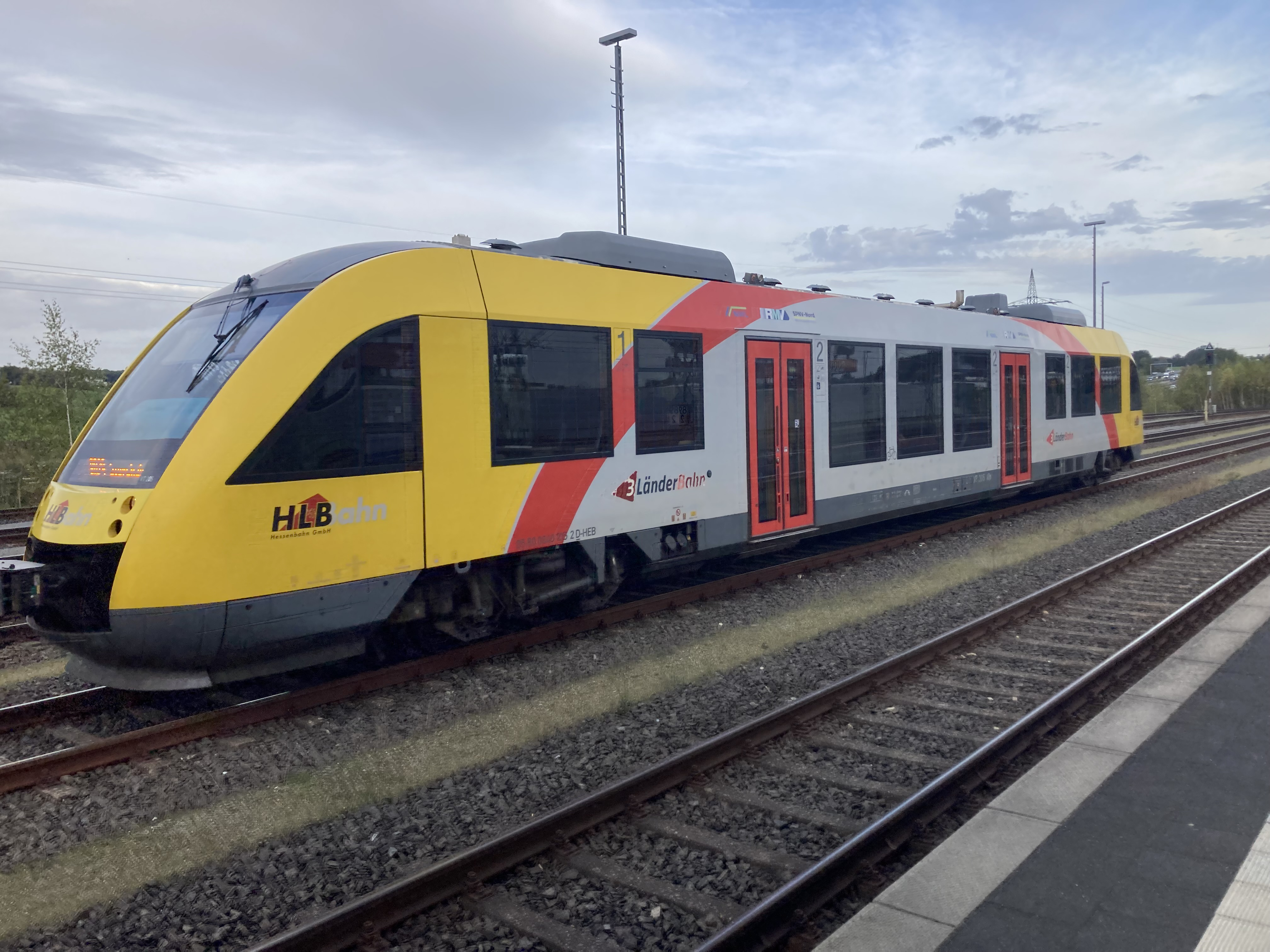
Train of line RB29 in the new Montabaur station

The new Montabaur station was opened in 2002 together with the Koeln - Rhein/Main high speed line, located on this line as well as Cross Westerwald railway, although there is no platform for the Cross Westerwald railway because it went out of service in 1981. Interchange to long-distance train service and local busses, Park and ride lot exists as well as at ticket teller of DB.

==== Dernbach (Westerw) ====
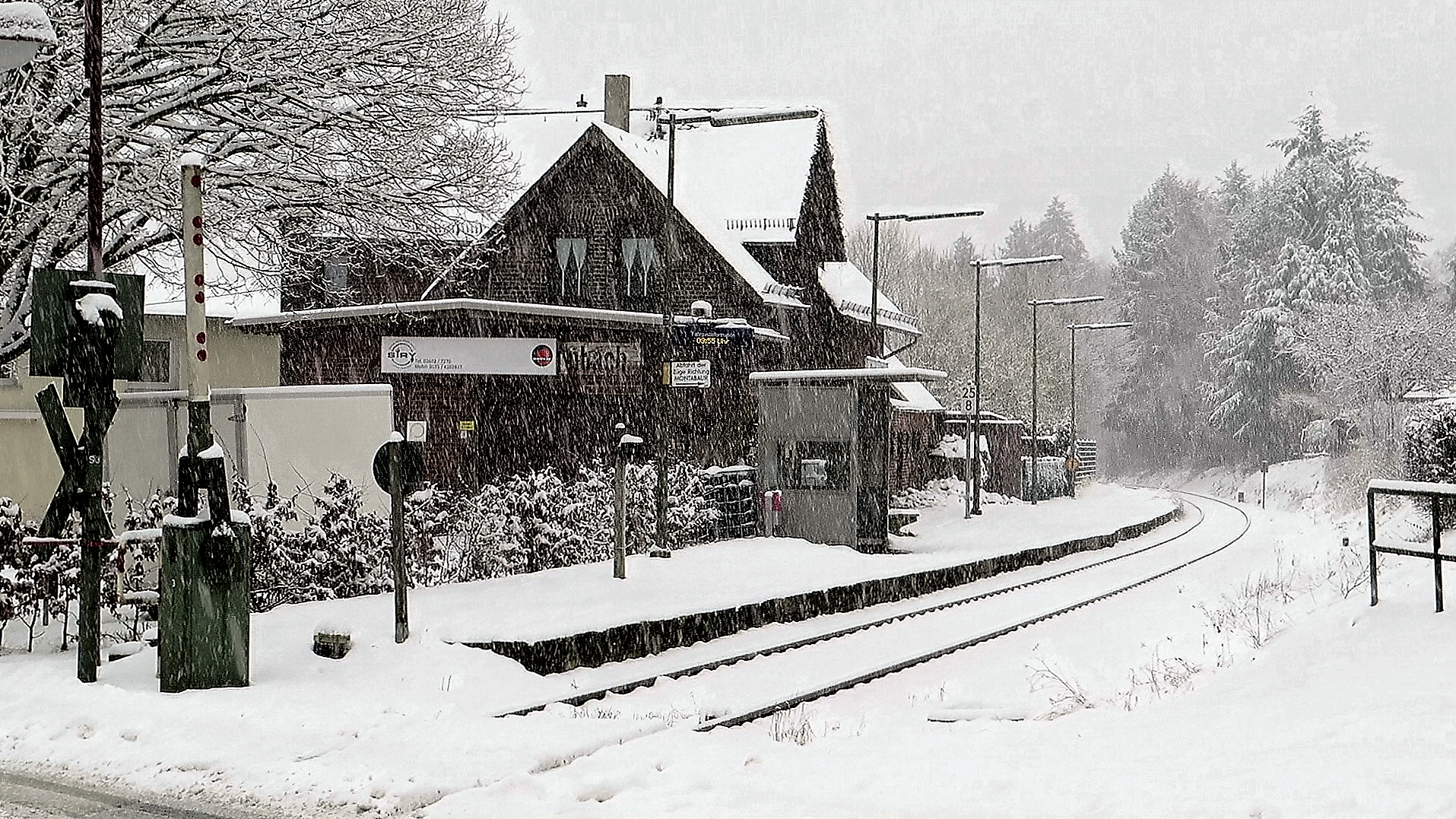
Dernbach stop

A stop with an unused, sold and now private owned station building, it is essentially preserved, since 1938, Dernbach is a stop, although nowadays there is only one track, it has two platforms at both sides of the railroad crossing. In the past, Dernbach also was a fright station, so also a goods shed was there.

==== Wirges ====
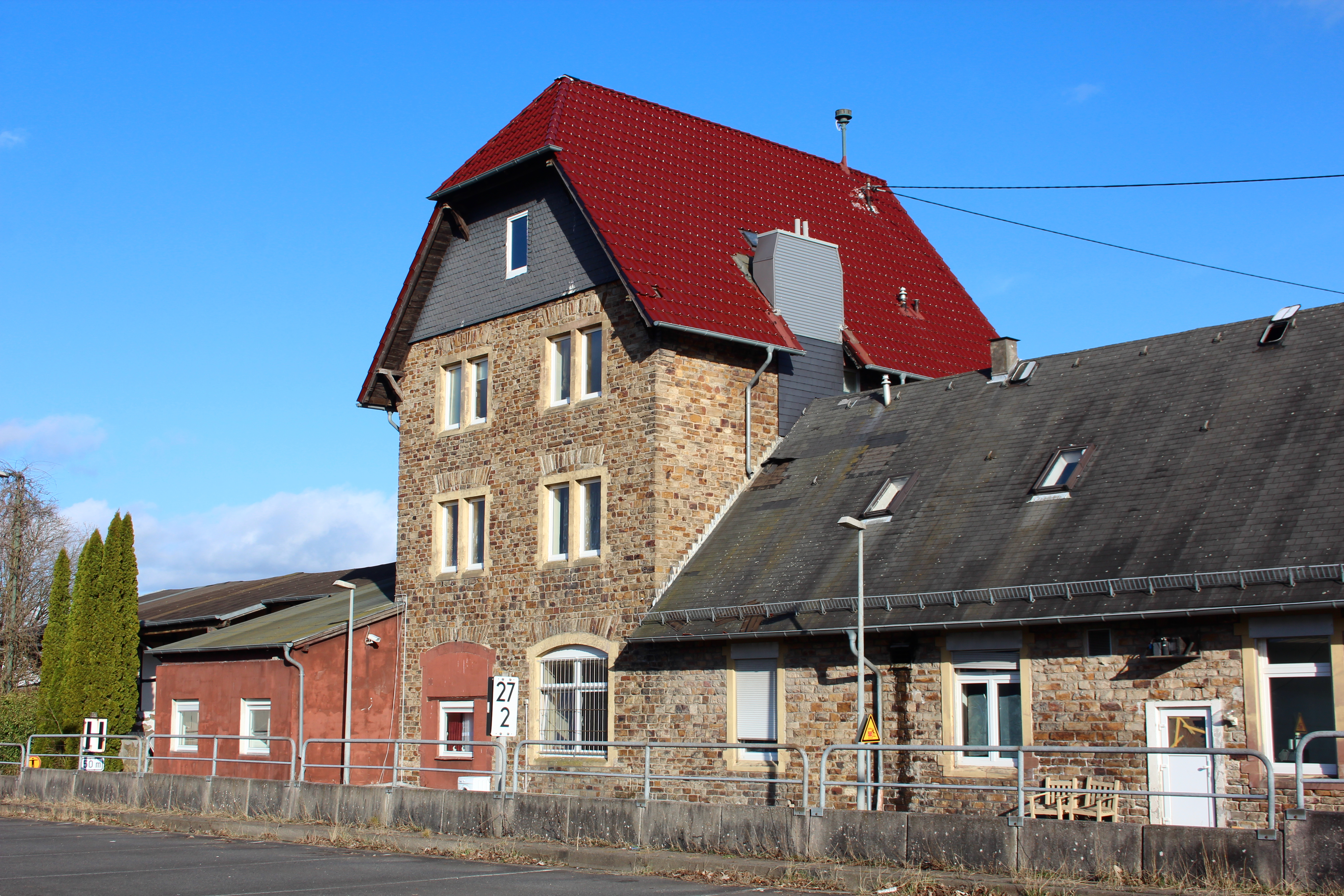
Wirges, former station building

The Wirges stop is located at the edge of Wirges close to Ebernhahn, interchange to local bus lines at they main road. The station building ist mostly preserved, but sold and I private ownership.

==== Siershahn ====
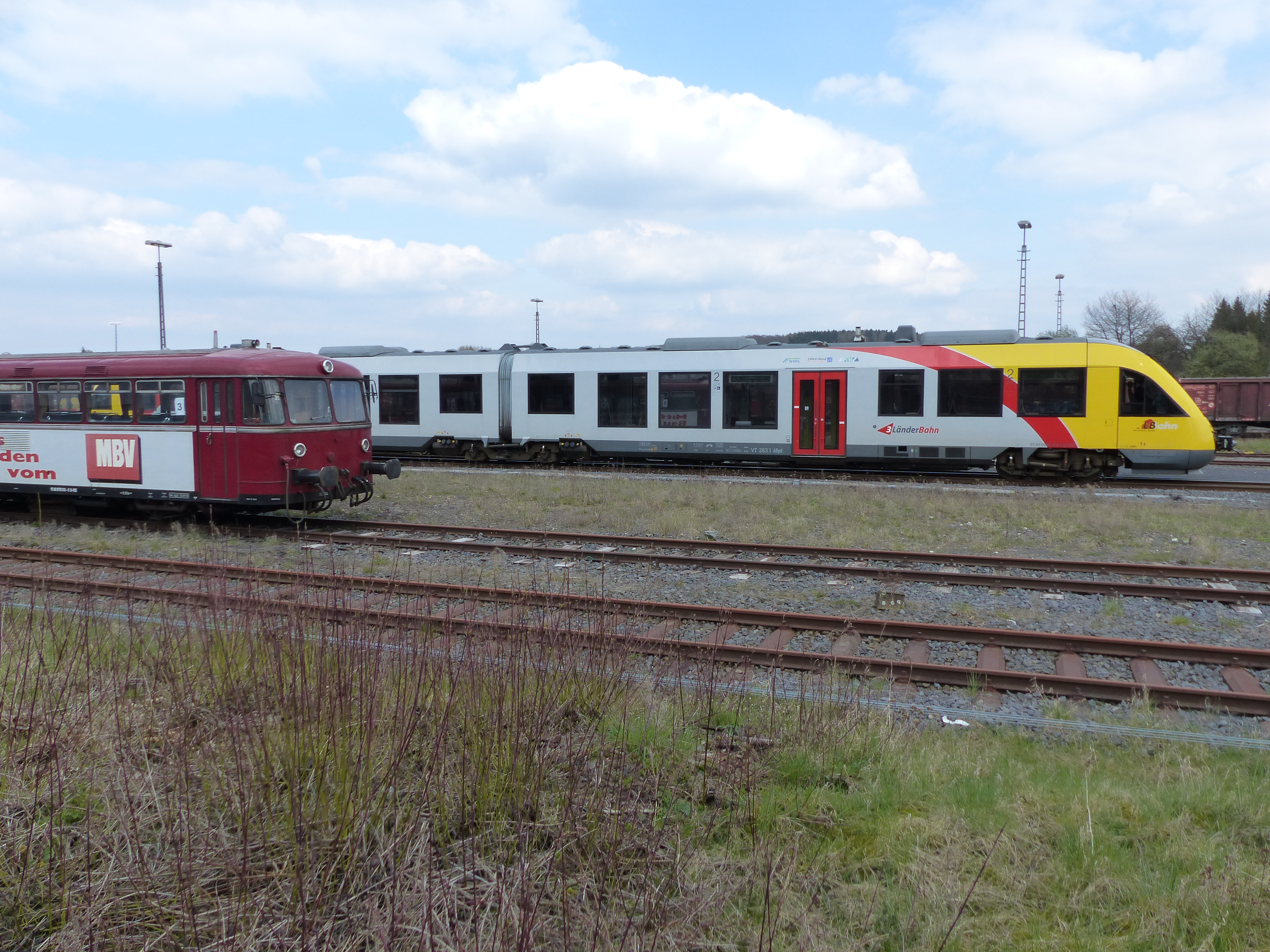
RB29 line train and special train of type VT98 chartered by Brexbachtalbahn e. V. in Siershahn

Siershahn station once was interchange to the trains of the Engers - Au railway, nowadays terminus for the passenger trains.

== Fares ==
Rhein-Main-Verkehrsverbund (RMV)

Verkehrsverbund Rhein-Mosel (VRM)

The section between Limburg-Staffel and Elz Süd is located in the area of the Rhein-Main-Verkehrsverbund (Rhine-Main Transport Association, RMV), the section between Niedererbach and Siershahn in the area of the Verkehrsverbund Rhein-Mosel (Rhine-Moselle Transport Association, VRM).
