= Ostheim (Cologne) =

Ostheim is an eastern district of Cologne

map of Ostheim within Kalk

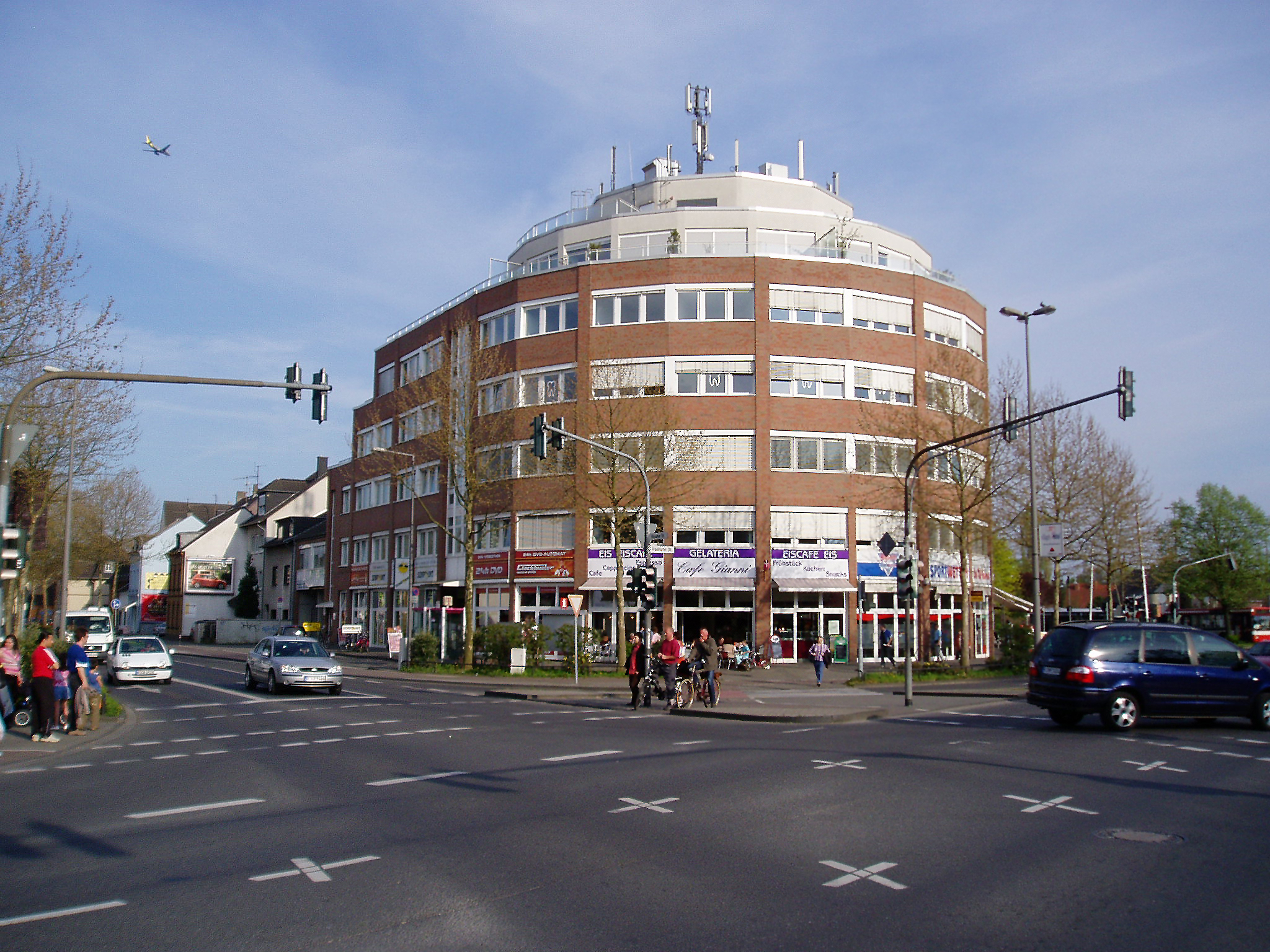
Local center of Ostheim – the Rundhaus (2007)

Ostheim (German pronunciation: [ˈɔsthaɪm]; Kölsch: Uustem or Kölsch: Ossheim) is an eastern district of Cologne in the Kalk district on the right bank of the Rhine. Until the 19th century, Ostheim was a small, agricultural village of the parish of Merheim. During the industrialization of the cities of Kalk and Mülheim am Rhein, Ostheim developed into a residential area for the workers of the factories there. With the incorporation of the mayoralty of Merheim on April 1, 1914, Ostheim became an independent district of Cologne.

Due to the bomb-related destruction of the larger neighboring districts in World War II and the associated housing shortage as well as increasing industrialization, several housing estates were built in Ostheim, so that the number of inhabitants more than tripled between 1950 and 1980. In particular, the high-rise area on Gernsheimer Strasse, built in the 1970s, developed into a social hotspot with an increased need for care. Through measures on the part of the authorities as well as private initiative, attempts are being made to counteract this development.

== Geography ==
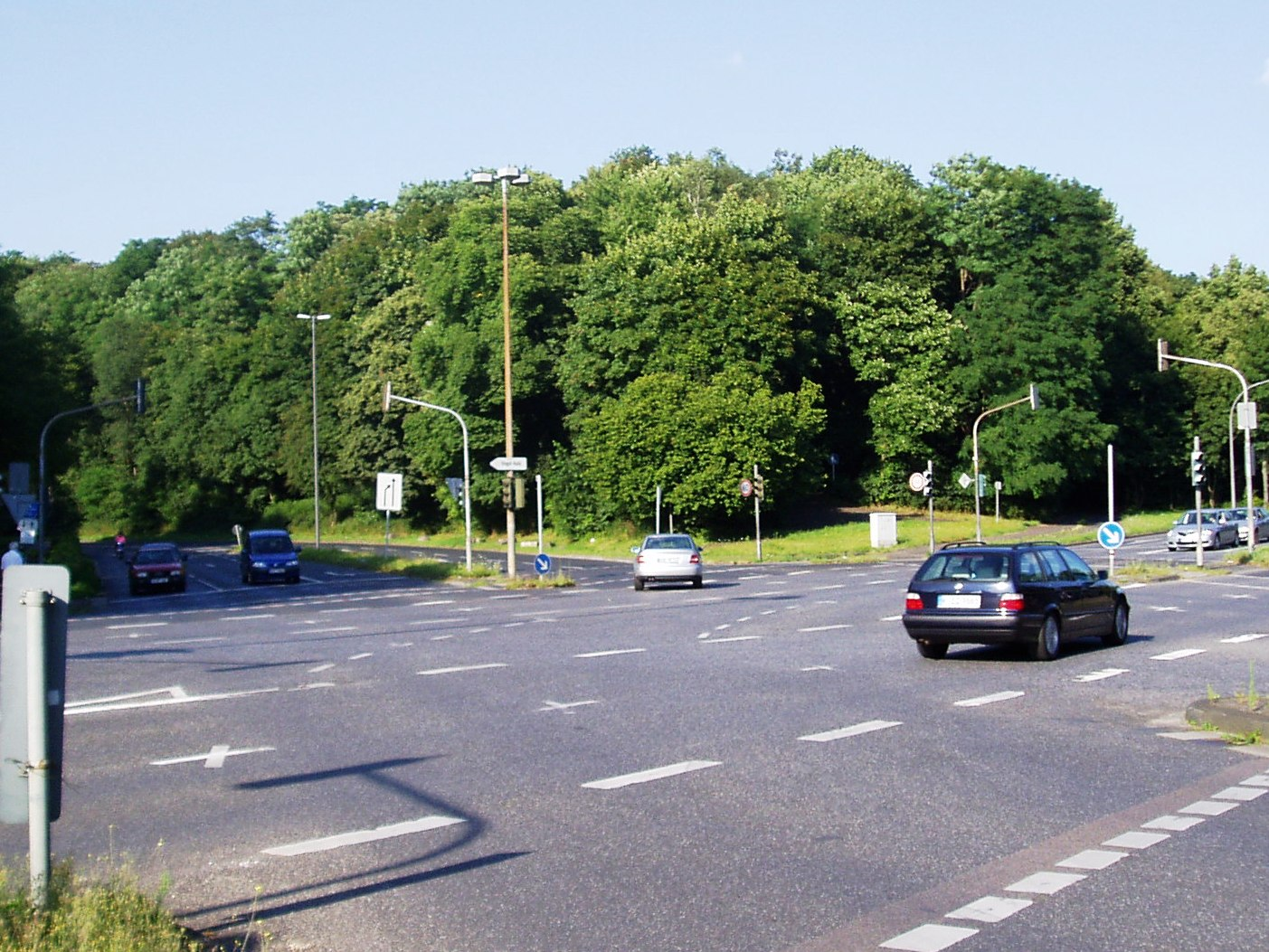
Vingster Berg (2008)

The old village center is located on a now dry gully in the formerly marshy area of the lower Rhine terrace east of an ice-age branch of the Rhine. The soil of the formerly mostly forested area is strongly loess- and clay-rich, the altitude of the mostly flat village area is around 50 meters above sea level. The geographically highest point is the Vingster Berg in the northwest of the district, which was heaped up to 64 meters with debris from buildings destroyed in World War II in the neighboring districts.

Ostheim borders the districts of Neubrück and Rath/Heumar to the east with the Autobahn 3 and 4 running together here, the district of Gremberghoven to the south with the federal highway 3, the district of Humboldt/Gremberg with the Cologne-Siegen railroad line running to the southwest, the district of Vingst to the west and the district of Merheim to the north. Only at the intersection of Frankfurter Straße/Vingster Ring does the district border Höhenberg. The district is located about 7.5 kilometers east of Cologne city center.

== History ==
In 1147, Pope Eugene III confirmed the Deutz Abbey's possessions in a document. In this enumeration a homestead Oestheim is mentioned. The name is probably derived from the eastern location of the village within these possessions. Another theory points to the eastern location to the Maarberg and the long valley, today's Ostheimer Straße, as the origin of the name. Whether the location of this homestead is identical with that of the village Ostheim cannot be proven. Until the construction of the Servatius Chapel in the 18th century, only isolated written mentions in distorted spelling are known about the village. Information about the structure of the village or the number of farms and their ownership is not available in the written documents.

=== High Middle Ages to Early Modern Times ===
The existence of the Hardtgenbusch farm, demolished around 1850, on the southern Ostheim territory can be traced back to the 12th century. In a codex written by a monk of the Benedictine Abbey of Deutz in 1164 it is reported that Rupertus Tuitensis, the tenth abbot of the abbey, had bequeathed to his monks, among other things, four shillings of Harthekenrode. From this, on the anniversary of his death, March 4, 1129, and on the feast of St. Lauwrence, August 10, the menu was to be improved with rolls and fish. In a document dated March 13, 1386, it is proven that Harthekenrode and Hardtgenbusch were at least equivalent in location. At the request of Archbishop Friedrich of Cologne and Duke William II of Berg, the exact border between the Electorate of Cologne and the Duchy of Berg was described, which had existed since the integration of the Deutzgau into the then County of Berg. It ran between the Stein auf dem Maar (between Grevenberge (today's Gremberg) and Hatgenrode) and the Stein am Hohlweg (between Vinze, today's Vingst and Oysten, today's Ostheim). The Hardtgenbuscher Hof with the associated Gut Große Plantage belonged to the parish of Merheim in the Duchy of Berg, as did the village, but was not included in the village area of Ostheim until the 19th century.

The village was officially mentioned in a protocol of the Merheim parish dated May 13, 1710, which was drawn up for the blessing of the Servatius Chapel built from 1707 to 1710:

"On the basis of the permission graciously granted to me, Johann Heinrich Schneidewind, by my Most Reverend and Serene Lord, and at the request of the Most Reverend Gottfried Krautwigh, pastor in Merheim, I have blessed, in a simple form and without holy anointing, according to the regulation of the Roman ritual, the chapel which was erected from the foundations near the village of Oesdorf of the parish of Merheim in honor of the holy bishop and martyr Servatius at the expense of the aforementioned pastor [... ]. "

The name Oesdorf is probably a misspelling of the place name, because already in 1716 the place was called Ostem in the visitation of the properties of the parish of Merheim. This name is almost identical to Uustem, the present dialectal name for the place.

Since 1768, the Frankfurter Chaussee, which was used by many merchants to circumvent the Cologne stacking law, ran parallel to the border. The old course of the road touched the present district area only in the extreme south. Due to its peripheral location in the duchy, the village was only sparsely populated. As a result, the village center developed away from the Frankfurter Chaussee in the area of Dorfstraße (today's Zehnthofstraße) and Merheimer Weg (today's Werntgenstraße), the direct connection to the main village of Merheim. The border to Electorate Cologne was only abolished with the Reichsdeputationshauptschluss in 1803 during the French period.

=== Development to the district ===
Until the 19th century, the village consisted of several farms of different sizes and a few residential houses. With the advancing industrialization of the nearby towns of Kalk and Mülheim, more housing was built in the village at the turn of the century for the workers employed there. The population increased from 342 in 1890 to 832 in 1910. After the Servatius Chapel on Merheimer Strasse (today: Werntgenstrasse) was no longer sufficient for the growing number of worshippers, the Servatius Church was built in the immediate vicinity in 1906. The old chapel was demolished at the request of the responsible Merheim priest Wolters, since in the opinion of the church council it had no artistic or historical value. The property was sold to Berggeist A.G. Brühl, which built a transformer house there. It was not until 1912 that the parish of St. Servatius became independent.

In 1904, Ostheim was connected to the Vorortbahnlinie A from Cologne to Königsforst. In order to ensure the power supply of the suburban railroad and the expected increased energy demand of the surrounding growing towns, the city of Cologne built an electricity plant in the immediate vicinity of the stop in the same year. Despite the growing population, only very few commercial enterprises settled in the town. In 1914, only 60 Ostheim citizens were employed in the brickworks Lüngen & Co and Karl Kuhlmann, the Backofentürenfabrik Karl Höffler and the electricity plant; the other workers were mainly employed in the neighboring industrial locations Kalk and Mülheim. Around Saarbrücker Straße, the Saar-Siedlung, the first large-scale construction project of the district with single- and two-family houses, was built in the 1930s.

=== National Socialism period ===
With the opening of the Ostheim air base in June 1937, the town gained importance in the Third Reich. The airport facilities extended from Ostheim to what is now Neubrück; the depots were located in Königsforst, the accommodations in Merheim. The air base was home to Fighter Squadron 234 (later Fighter Squadron 26 "Schlageter") and mainly Bf 109 aircraft were stationed at the base. Due to the construction of the highway Düsseldorf-Frankfurt (today: BAB 3) Ostheim was divided in 1936/37. The air base was now located to the east of the autobahn, and the village of Ostheim to the west. The road to Merheim, which was now called "Ostmerheimer Straße", was given the name of the aviation pioneer Bruno Werntgen. On the other side of the autobahn, it remained "Ostmerheimer Strasse".

On April 13, 1945, Ostheim airfield was occupied by the Americans. Since the air base was only about 10 kilometers away from Wahn Airport, the Allies saw no need for its preservation - the airport facilities were therefore demolished. The barracks buildings are mostly preserved and are used today as residential buildings, commercial buildings, and by the Merheim Hospital. The Große Plantage was the site of one of the heavy anti-aircraft batteries in the Cologne area from 1944.

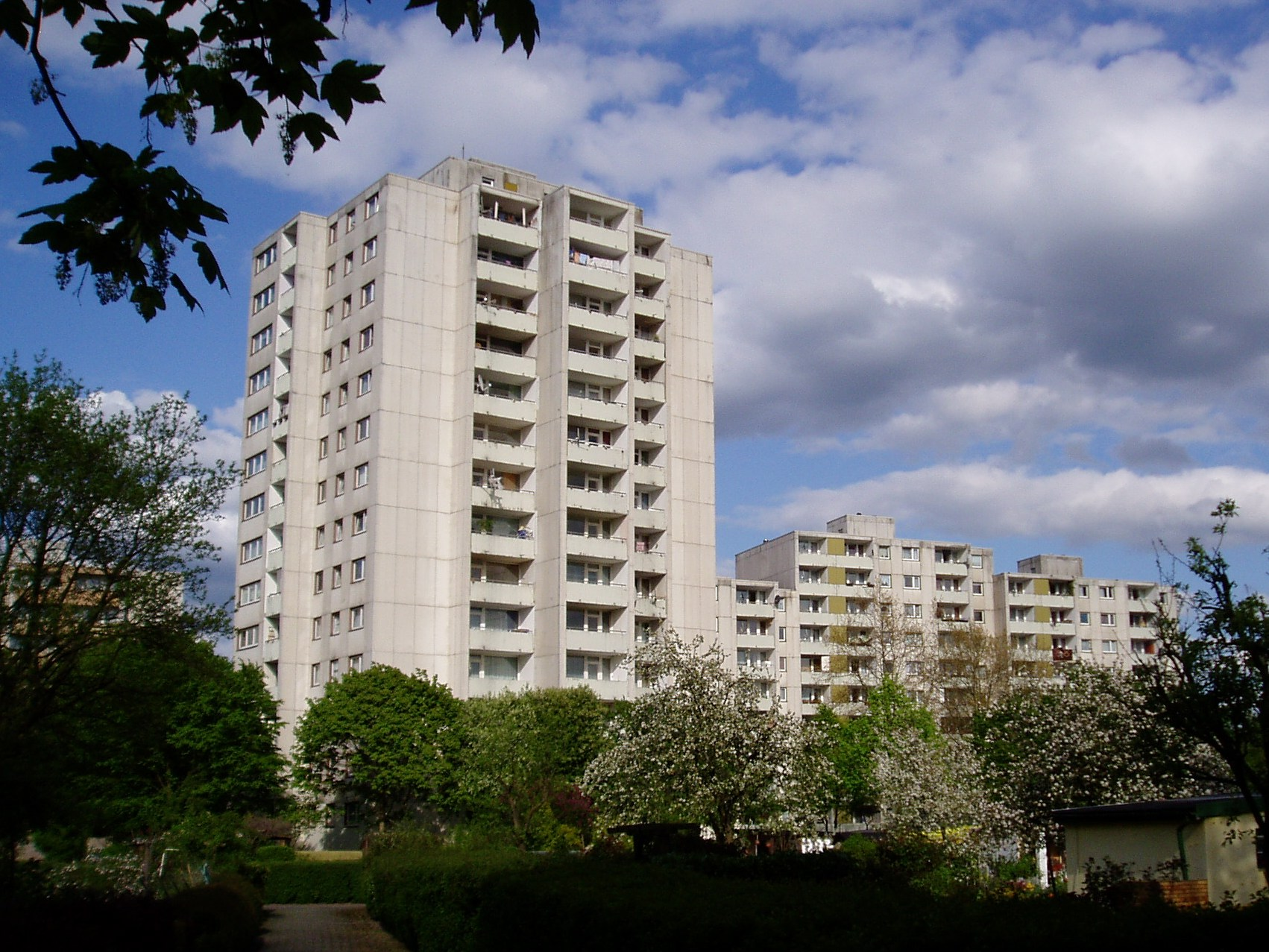
High-rise buildings on Gernsheimer Strasse

=== From 1950 until today ===
After World War II, new housing was urgently needed for the employees of the Kalk and Mülheim industrial sites. Due to the large rural open spaces and the good transport connections, two more large-scale one- to two-family house estates were built in the southern part of the town in the 1950s, the Postsiedlung (1952/1953) and the Badener Viertel (1956/57). In the north, the first social housing estate was built between 1954 and 1958 by the Gemeinnützige Aktiengesellschaft für Wohnungsbau. The number of inhabitants increased from 3000 to 8900 during this period. For the Protestant community of Kalk, the Church of the Resurrection was built in 1953 and consecrated on March 21, 1954. The church was assigned to the Protestant parish of Ostheim in 1957, when it became independent. The Catholic congregation had a second place of worship, the Church Zu den Heiligen Engeln, at its disposal from 1961.

At the beginning of the 1970s, a residential area for about 2,500 residents was built on Gernsheimer Strasse in a dense high-rise construction. Due to high unemployment and the simultaneous neglect of the living space, this street in particular developed into a social hotspot. The city of Cologne and the church are trying to counteract this development through support measures, such as the use of street workers.

== Population ==
=== Population structure and population development ===
Structure of the population of Cologne-Ostheim (2021):

- Average age of population: 38.5 years (Cologne average: 42.3 years)
- Proportion of foreigners: 31.3 % (Cologne average: 19.3 %)
- Unemployment rate: 17.5 % (Cologne average: 8.6 %)

Since the completion of the housing development in the 1970s, the population has stagnated. Only since the completion of the house Siedlung Buchheimer Weg redevelopment project in 2011 and the arrival of the first tenants in the Waldbadviertel Langendahlweg development area has there been a population increase. Of the 12,637 citizens registered in Ostheim on December 31, 2015, 6389 were female and 6248 male, and 29 citizens had registered Ostheim as their secondary residence. The average age of the population was 38.7 years. The proportion of foreign citizens increased from 15.4% in 1980 to 30.3% in 2015 (compared to Ø 18.5% in the urban area of Cologne).

1828	1850	1890	1900	1910	1950	1960	1980	1990	2000	2005	2010	2011	2012	2013	2014	2015
108	206	342	514	832	3600	8900	11.335	10.815	10.510	10.833	10.969	11.183	11.596	11.689	12.006	12.637

=== Religions ===
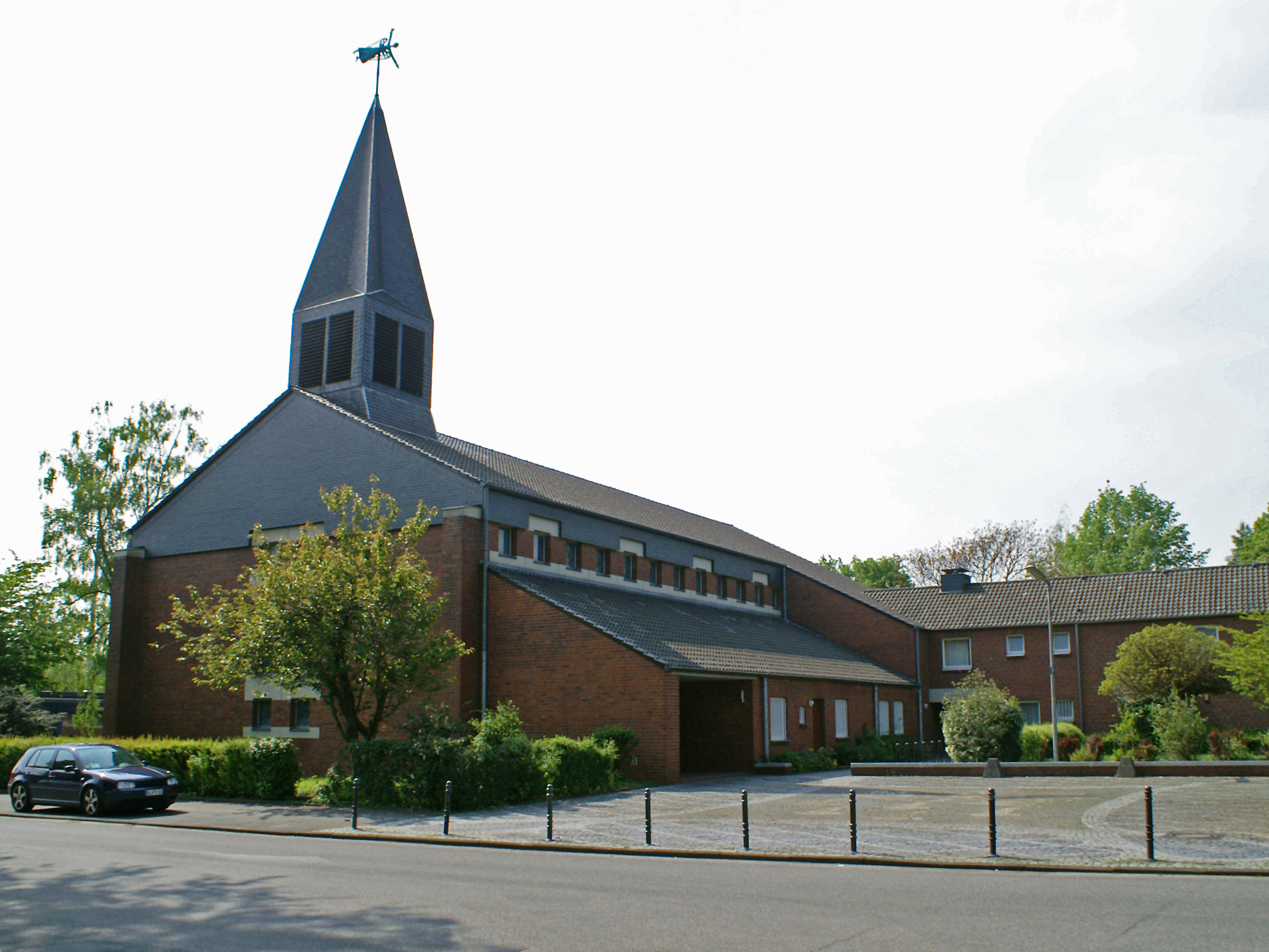
Zu den heiligen Engeln

28% of the Ostheim population is Catholic, 10.5% Protestant. The remaining people are either irreligious or belong to other religions and worldviews.[15] In addition to the Catholic parish of St. Servatius/Zu den heiligen Engeln, the Protestant parish of Ostheim/Rath and the congregation of the Free Evangelical Christians, a New Apostolic congregation was located in Ostheim from 1969 until the end of the 1990s - but this was dissolved due to the small size of the congregation. Muslims use prayer rooms in the neighboring districts of Vingst and Kalk.

== Politics ==
In terms of local politics, the citizens of Ostheim are represented by the district council of Cologne-Kalk.

In the district council election on May 25, 2014, the SPD received 36.6%, the CDU 28.7%, The Greens 9.1%, pro Köln 4.6%, The Left 8.4% and the AfD 4%. The turnout of the 7055 eligible voters was 36%. In the electoral district 45, which was formed together with Neubrück, the SPD was the strongest party with 33.51%. The SPD was the strongest party.

In the council election on May 25, 2014, the SPD received 35.9%, the CDU 29.9%, The Greens 8.6%, pro Köln 4.4%, The Left 8.1% and the AfD 3.8%. The turnout of the 7055 eligible voters was 36%. In the electoral district 45, which was formed together with Neubrück, Stephan Pohl of the CDU was elected to the Council of the City of Cologne. The election was held in Cologne.

In the 2013 German federal election, the SPD received 33.9% of the second votes, the CDU 33.5%, The Greens 8.1%, The Left 9.2%, FDP 4.3% and the AfD 4.2%. Martin Dörmann, the SPD candidate directly elected to the Bundestag for the Cologne constituency 1, received 39.9% in Ostheim. The turnout of 6214 eligible voters was 58.58%.

In the state election on May 13, 2012, the SPD received 39% of the second votes, the CDU 22.6%, The Greens 11%, Pirate Party 9.1%, FDP 7.2% and The Left 5.9%. Stephan Gatter, the SPD candidate directly elected to the state parliament for the state parliament constituency 18 Cologne VI, received 43.5% in Ostheim.

== Housing conditions and development ==
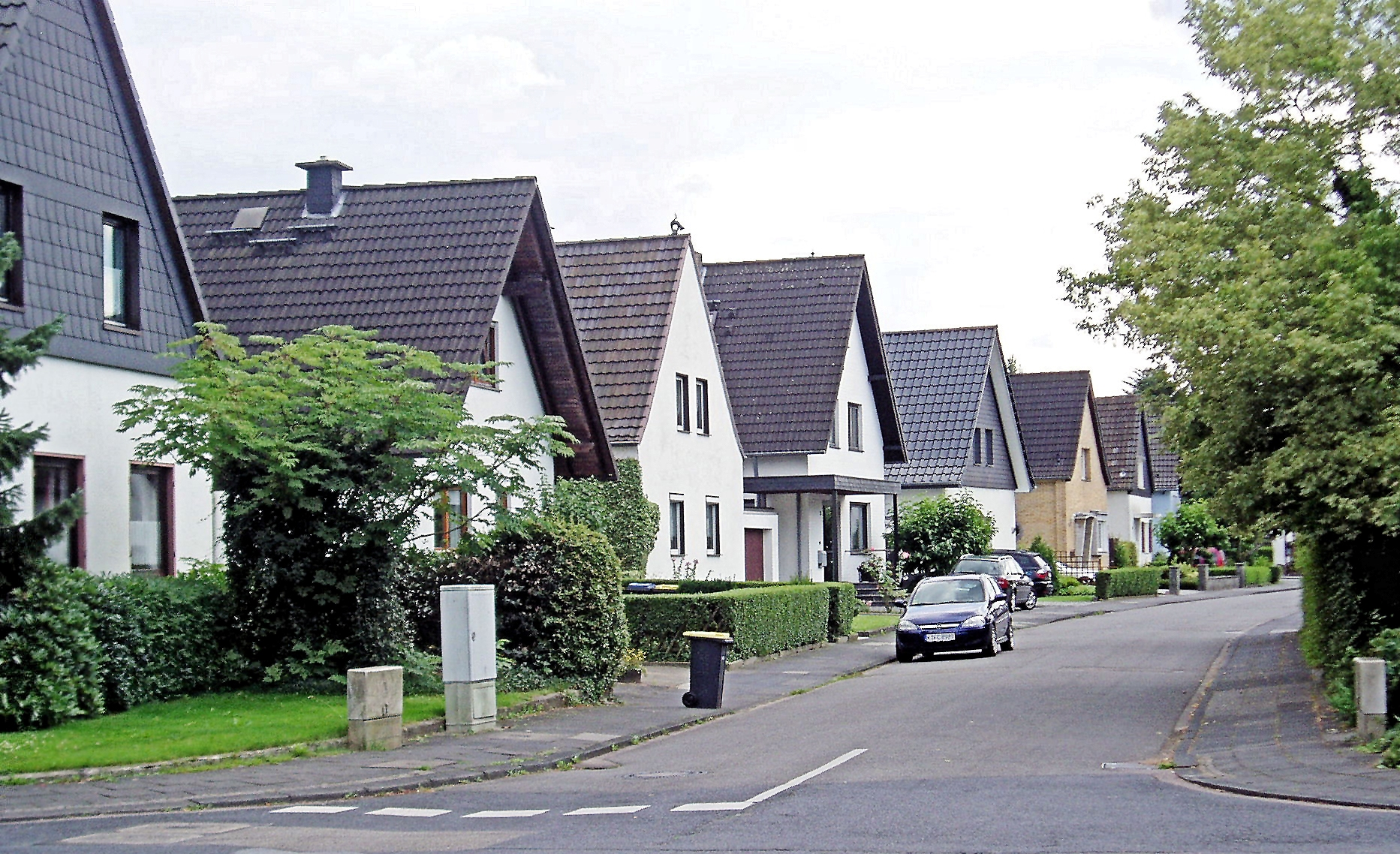
Houses in Baden quarter

The size of the 5513 apartments available in Ostheim, of which 29.6% were publicly subsidized, averaged 73.2 square meters. In 2014, the statistics of the Office of Urban Development listed 1002 one- and two-family houses and 487 multi-family houses. The average living space per citizen was 33.6 square meters. Approximately 35.4% of the district area is designated as residential land in the General Urban Ordinance Plan, 56% as green space, 4% as commercial land, 4% as public utility land, and 0.5% as water space.

In addition to a predominantly mixed development with various single-family and multi-family houses between the old town center on Zehnthofstraße and Rösrather Straße, several housing estates were built in the other areas of the district designated as residential areas after World War II. In the south of the village, private investors mostly built single-family houses and smaller apartment buildings, while in the north, housing associations erected mainly multi-story apartment buildings.

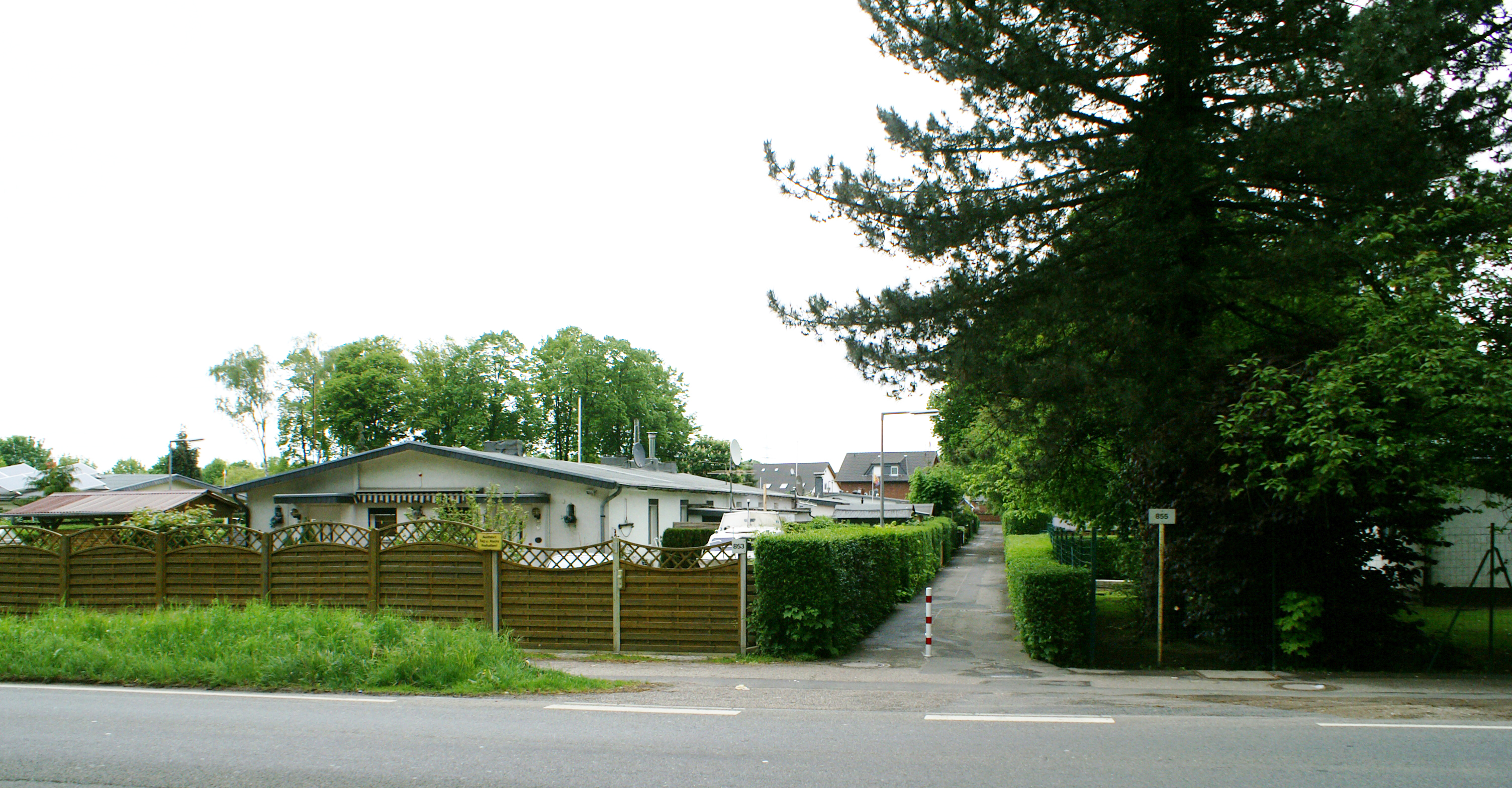
Humboldtsiedlung

=== Saarsiedlung, Baden Quarter and Bergstrasse Quarter ===
Built in the early 1930s around Saarbrücker Strasse, the single- and two-family housing estate was the first uniformly structured residential area in the district. The construction of the settlement was necessary because there was not enough building land available for higher-quality housing for the better-paid employees of the factories in the neighboring industrial locations on site. Beginning in the 1950s, construction of this type of housing continued in adjacent areas with the Badener Viertel (1956) and Bergstraßenviertel (1959). The streets of the individual quarters were named after towns in the Saarland, Baden and Bergstrasse.

=== Humboldtsiedlung ===
As housing for forced laborers, Klöckner-Humboldt-Deutz (KHD) built 15 barracks in the south of the village in the early 1940s, each with approximately 230 square meters of living space. These individual houses were divided into three equal-sized lots starting in 1944 to provide replacement housing for bombed-out employees of the plant. The city of Cologne, which later took over ownership of the simple apartment buildings from KHD, had wanted to demolish the estate since the 1980s due to the poor condition of some of the buildings, so tenant-free buildings were not re-rented. Due to the protests and initiative of the residents of the so-called Humboldtsiedlung, the plan has not yet been implemented. According to the tenants, the best solution would be for them to take over ownership of the apartments themselves.

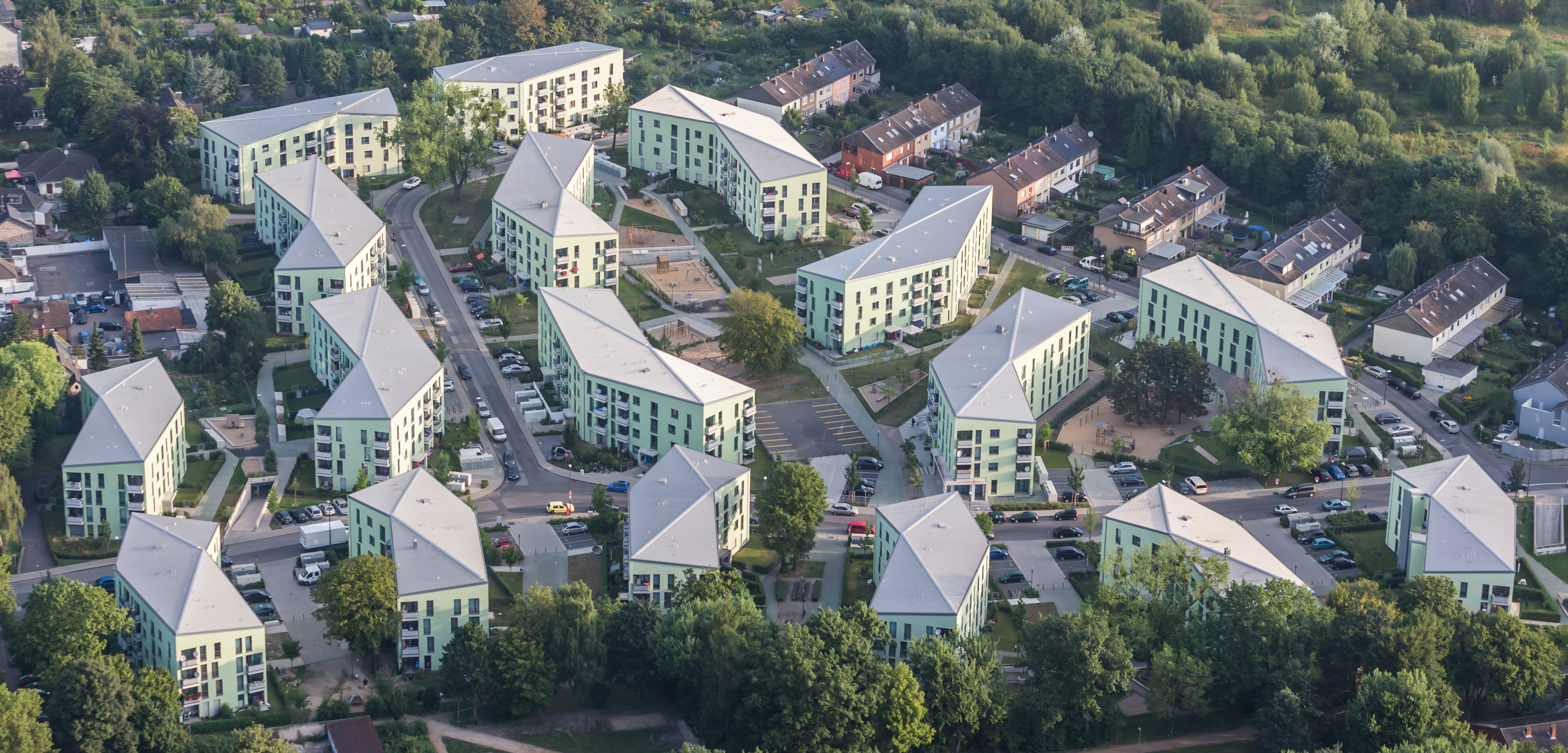
Siedlung Buchheimer Weg

=== Siedlung Buchheimer Weg ===
As part of the so-called Entbunkerungsprogramms, the Gemeinnützige Aktiengesellschaft für Wohnungsbau built a residential area with 1037 apartments between Buchheimer Weg, Grevenstrasse and Servatiusstrasse between 1954 and 1958, consisting of 99 apartment buildings with up to eight stories and 36 single-family houses. The majority of the residential buildings were built with three to four stories. The developer integrated a row of stores and a communal washhouse into the housing estate. From 2002 to 2011, many apartment buildings were extensively renovated, others were demolished and replaced by new buildings. The single-family houses were sold to private individuals beforehand. After the completion of the redevelopment, the number of rental apartments within the estate was reduced to 959. The cost of the redevelopment was estimated at €102.2 million.

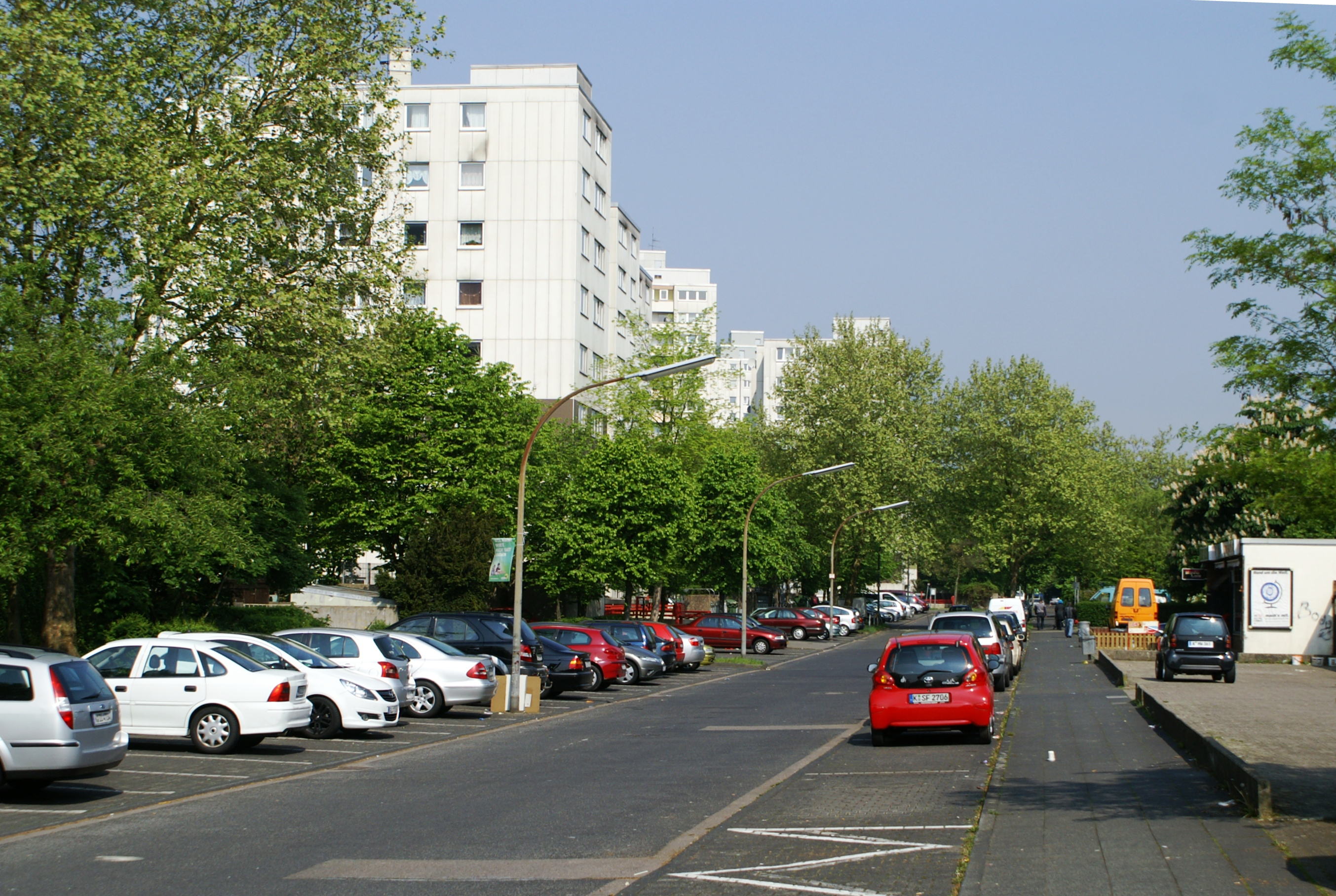
Gernsheimer Straße

=== Settlement Gernsheimer Straße ===
On the site of a former Prussian parade ground in the northwest of the town, housing for 2,500 people was created in the early 1970s in dense high-rise construction. Some of the residential buildings were subsidized with public funds, others were sold as condominiums. In the early days, the apartment buildings, which were up to 14 stories high, were regarded by the public as a prime example of modern subsidized housing, but just a few years later the residential location was perceived as unattractive by a large part of the population, so that the street gradually fell into disrepair. In 2002, the housing estate was included in the subsidy program Sozialraum mit erhöhtem Erneuerungsbedarf. In 2007, about 2800 people lived in the settlement, of whom about 70% had a migration background.

=== Waldbadviertel Langendahlweg ===
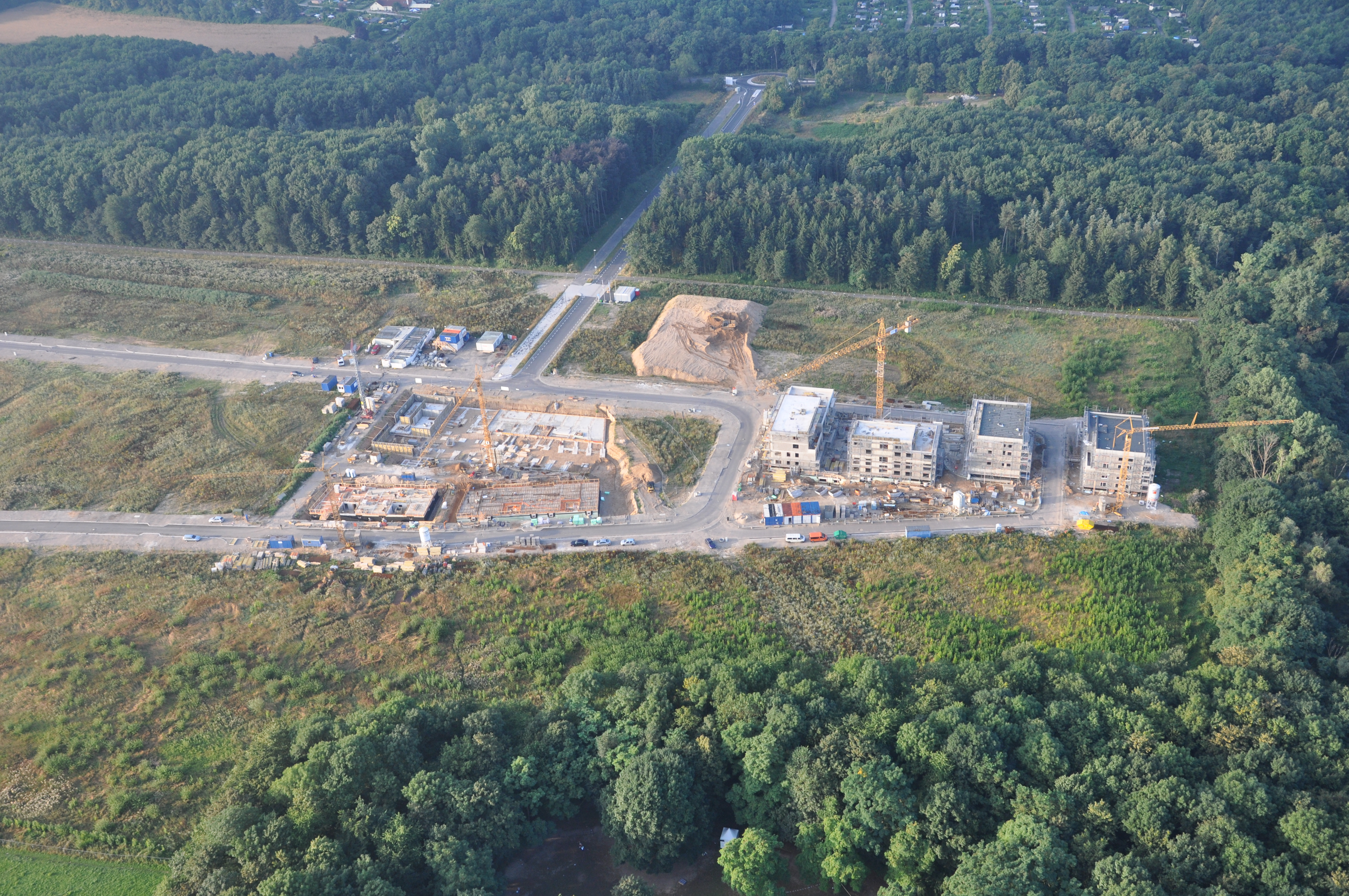
Waldbadviertel Langendahlweg – The million acre

Back in the 1960s, the city of Cologne leased a 145,000-square-meter area of farmland in the southwestern district between Saarsiedlung and the Freibad Vingst, which was owned by a local farmer at the time. The site was originally earmarked for an extension to the Evangelical Hospital Kalk and a retirement home for the Clarenbachstift in Cologne - but these plans were scrapped at an early stage. Since for this fallow land about 16,000,000 euros rent was paid to the farmer and his heirs, the area is called "The million acre" on the part of the population.

Despite massive citizen protests, the Cologne City Council decided in 2008 to build 640 residential units, 400 of which were to be integrated into apartment buildings. The citizens of Ostheim feared that the technical and social infrastructure of the district would not allow an influx of approximately 2,000 new citizens. After several citizen hearings, the city of Cologne changed the development plan so that the foundation stone could be laid in the fall of 2012. The first apartment buildings were ready for occupancy in spring 2014. By 2018, 450 rental units, some of them subsidized with public funds, are to be built in mostly three-story apartment buildings, as well as up to 240 owner-occupied homes. Almost all streets were named after women who had a connection to the former state of Baden. The access road to the new development bears the name of the former Kalk district chairman Hans Offermann.

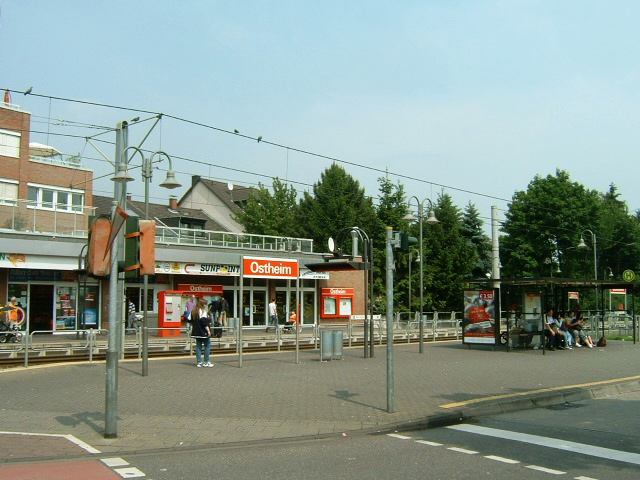
Ostheim stop

== Infrastructure and economy ==
=== Transport ===
With the Frankfurter Straße (B 8), the Ostheimer Straße and the Rösrather Straße (L 284) the village is connected to the Cologne road network. Although several highways run through the town, Ostheim does not have its own federal highway connection. The federal highways 3, 4 and 559 can be reached within a few minutes via neighboring districts.

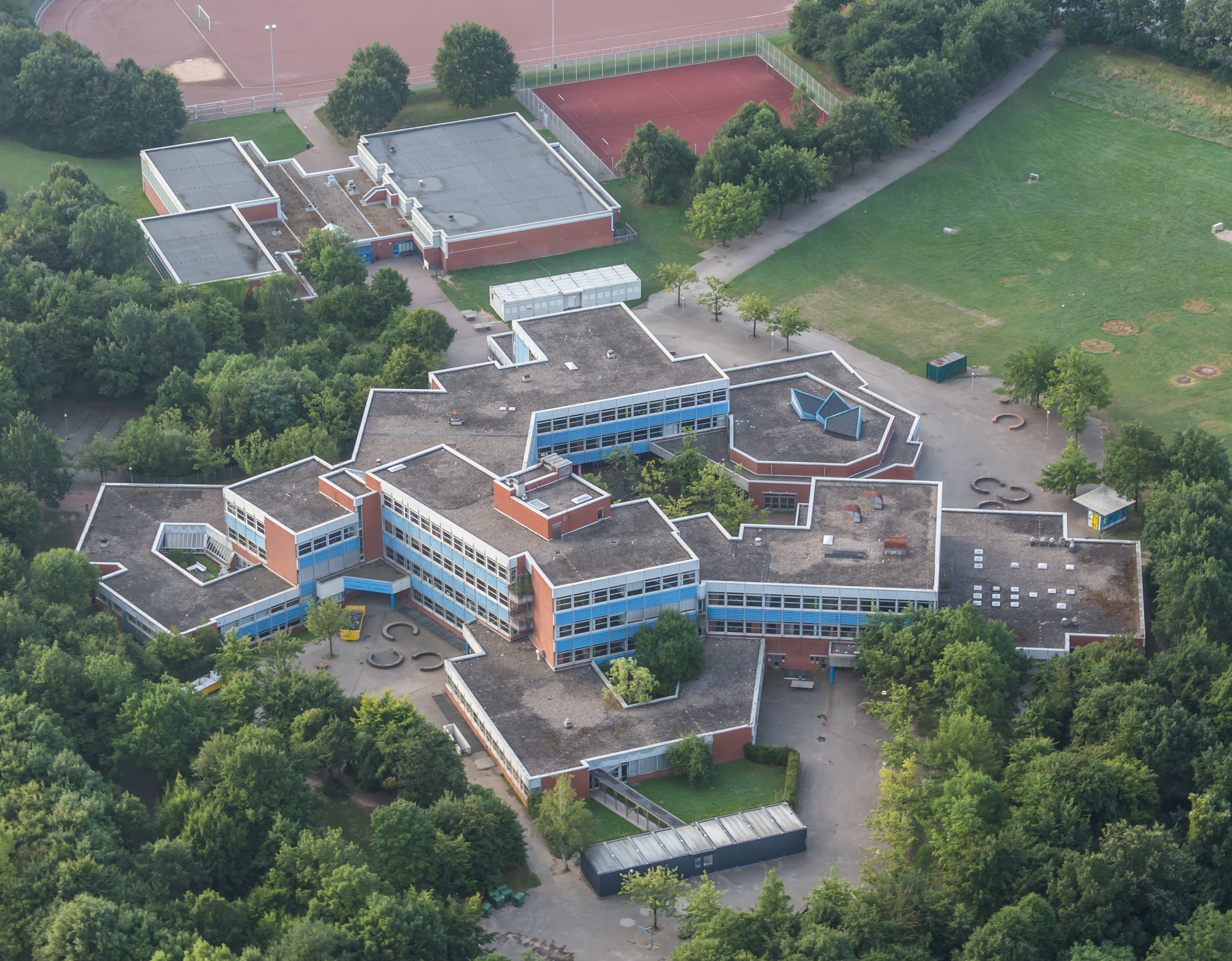
Ostheim school center

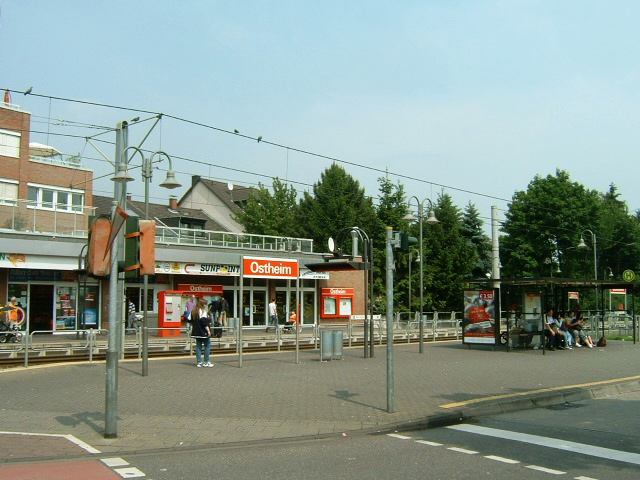
Ostheim stop

The Ostheim stop of the Kölner Verkehrs-Betriebe is one of the main transfer stops in the city area on the right bank of the Rhine, because the light rail line 9 and the KVB bus lines 151, 152, 157 and 191 cross there. The light rail line connects Ostheim with downtown Cologne in thirteen minutes. With the bus lines, many districts on the right bank of the Rhine can be reached without having to change trains. Since December 2014, the new bus line 191 has connected the new, somewhat remote Waldbad neighborhood with the center of the district.

Line	Route / Remarks	Takt (Mon-Fri)
9	Sülz – Zülpicher Straße/Gürtel – University – Köln Süd station – Zülpicher Platz – Neumarkt – Heumarkt – Bf. Deutz/Messe – Deutz Technische Hochschule – Kalk Post – Kalk Kapelle – Vingst – Ostheim – Rath/Heumar – Königsforst	10 min

The suburban and regional train station Köln Frankfurter Straße, located on the district's border with Gremberghoven, provides direct connections to Cologne Bonn Airport, Troisdorf, Cologne Central Station and the Bergisches Land region with the S 19 and RB 25 lines.

=== Education and care ===
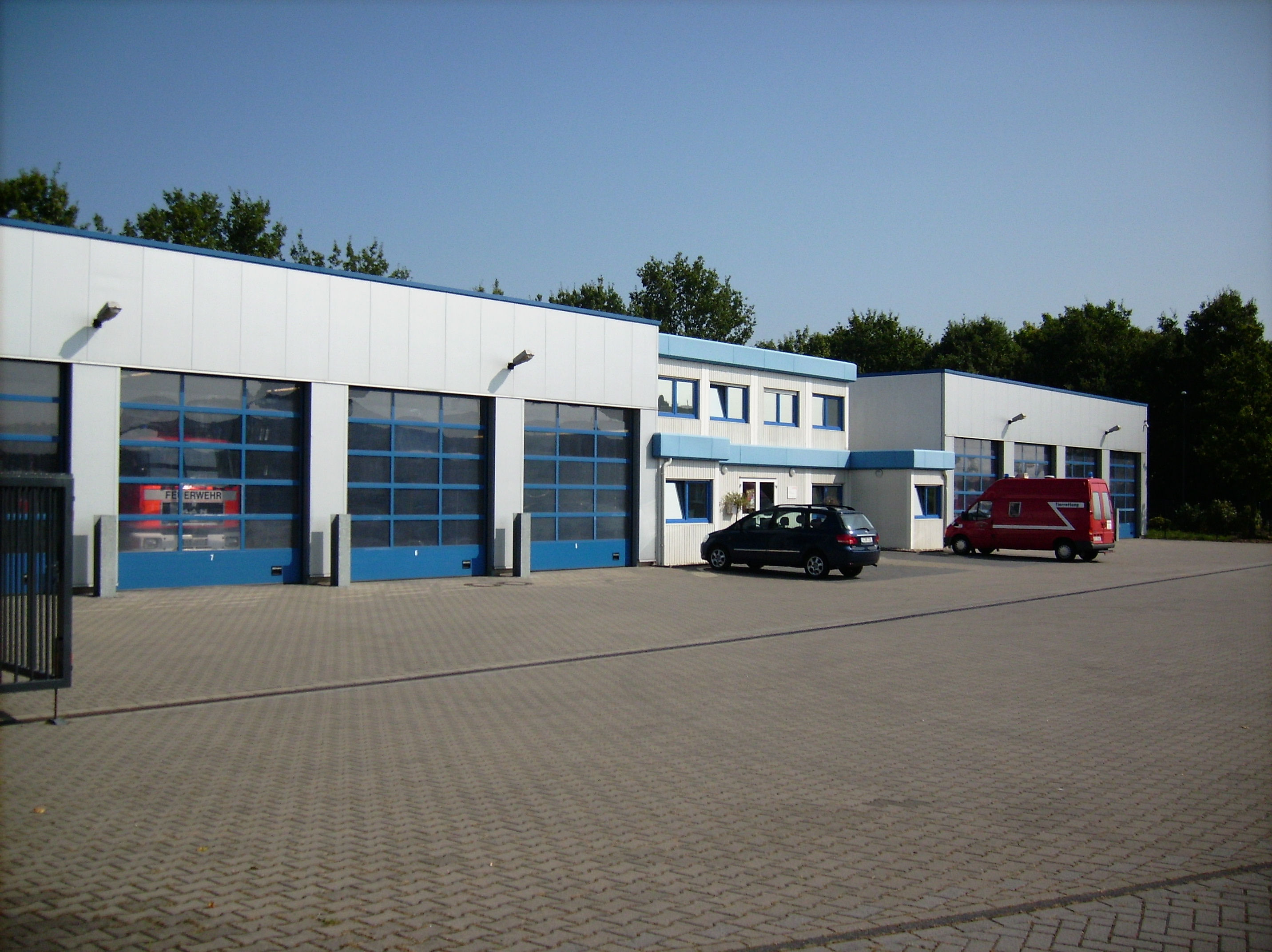
Fire Station 8

The Ostheim School Center, built in 1981, is home to the Heinrich Heine High School and the Albert Schweitzer Secondary School. The school center has a three-part multipurpose hall, two small multipurpose halls and a large outdoor sports facility that is also used for external sports events. The Kurt-Tucholsky-Hauptschule, which was also previously located there, had to move to Neubrück in 2007 due to a lack of space. The City of Cologne set up a branch of the Martin Köllen special school on Edisonstraße in the direct vicinity of the Zehnthofstraße elementary schools. After the branch of the special school was relocated to Humboldt/Gremberg in the summer of 2014, the James Krüss Elementary School (community elementary school) and the Zehnthofstraße Catholic Elementary School have since used the site alone. In addition to two Catholic kindergartens, there is a municipal kindergarten and a crèche.

=== Social projects ===
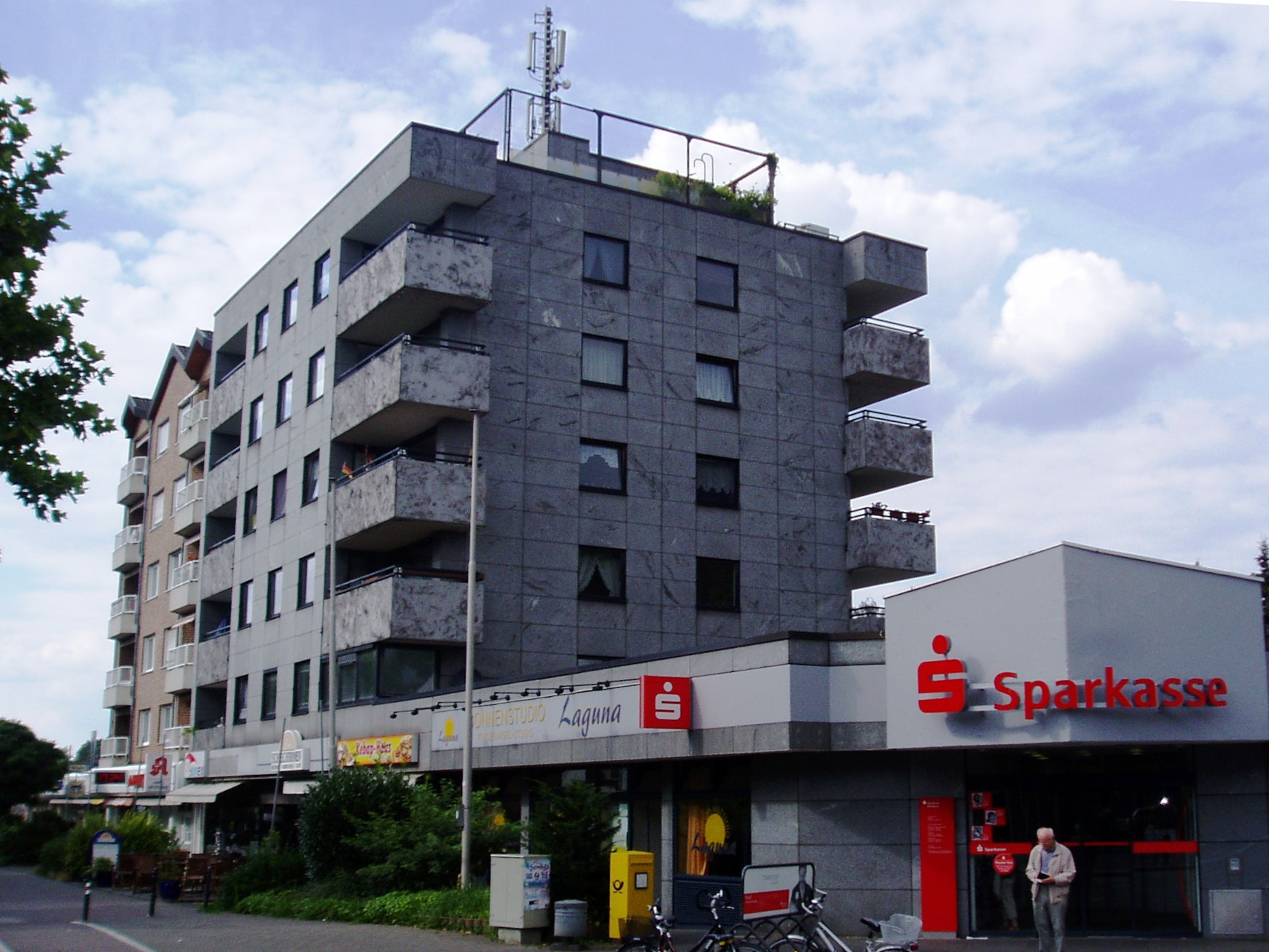
Shopfront at the Sparkasse KölnBonn

Since 1958, the Offene Tür (OT) Ostheim has existed on Buchheimer Weg, offering children and young people a wide range of leisure activities, as well as youth occupational assistance and homework help. The OT works with four full-time supervisors and up to ten freelancers. The facility is run by the church association Zu den heiligen Engeln und St. Servatius e. V.

The Veedel e. V. association, founded in the early 1990s, set up two job exchanges, a clothes closet and a youth pavilion in the town, in addition to a district office to which citizens in need and seeking advice can turn. In 2002, the project, which works with 20 volunteers and one full-time social worker, received the "Social City 2002" award from the state of North Rhine-Westphalia.

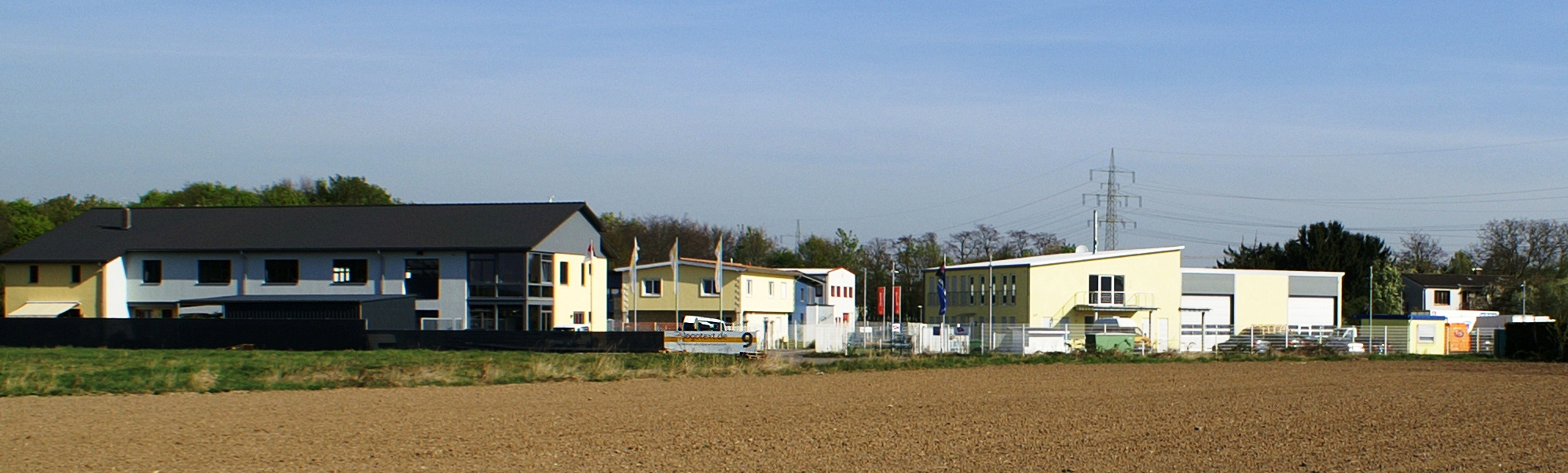
Herkenrathweg industrial estate

In 1979, the Bläck Fööss sang about the district and its social structure in the song Dä Manni us Ossheim.

=== Public safety and rescue ===
In 2003, Fire Station 8 of the Cologne Fire Department was established at Hardtgenbuscher Kirchweg. The additional construction was necessary because the surrounding fire stations could not provide sufficient fire protection for the eastern parts of the city with the necessary speed. Ostheim is the location of the Rettungswache Köln of the Johanniter-Unfall-Hilfe. The location is served by the Polizei-Inspektion Südost, which assigns a district officer as a contact person for the Ostheim population.

=== Business world and trade ===
The roundhouse at the main intersection of Rösrather/Frankfurter Strasse, completed in 1996, and the row of stores opposite, built in 1976 at the Sparkasse KölnBonn, are regarded as the center of the district. In addition to about a dozen retail stores located there, three supermarkets, two gas stations and several other specialty retailers are located in the rest of the district. Ten inns and four restaurants are operated in Ostheim.

In the early 1970s, the construction of extensive production facilities of the commercial vehicle manufacturer Klöckner-Humboldt-Deutz was planned in the southeast of the town. Due to the group's financial difficulties, this project was not realized. The approximately 2.5 hectares of open land that was not needed was declared a commercial area by the city of Cologne. Despite intensive efforts over decades to attract small or medium-sized companies to the newly created Herkenrathweg industrial park, only a few small businesses were established there. The remaining district area is designated in the General Urban Ordinance Plan as a residential or public use area, so that no new commercial settlement is possible there.

== Culture and sights ==
=== Associations ===
In addition to the SSV Ostheim 1931 e. V. soccer club, which has had a new club facility on Servatiusstraße since 2007, the Sportschützengesellschaft Köln-Ostheim 1963 e. V. and the DJK Ostheim gymnastics and sports club, the village is also home to Tierschutzverein Menschen für Tiere e. V und Pit Bull & Co. The Kolping Family Ostheim celebrated its 50th anniversary in June 2007.

=== Regular events ===
The annual parade on Carnival Sunday is organized by the Förderverein für den Ostheimer Karnevalsumzug. The local Schützenfest traditionally takes place on the weekend after Pentecost. The initiative Veedel e. V. organizes the Ostheim citizens' festival "Wir sind Ostheim" (We are Ostheim) with the support of local associations and tradespeople.

=== Green spaces ===
The 64-meter-high Vingster Berg, a wooded hill heaped up from rubble from World War II, is part of a green belt crisscrossed with walking paths that borders Merheim, Höhenberg and Vingst. A circular path on the site of the former Gutes Plantage on Herkenrathweg runs past agricultural land and numerous overgrown fruit trees. The large allotment garden area Alter-Deutzer-Postweg is located in the southwest of the village.

=== Buildings and monuments ===
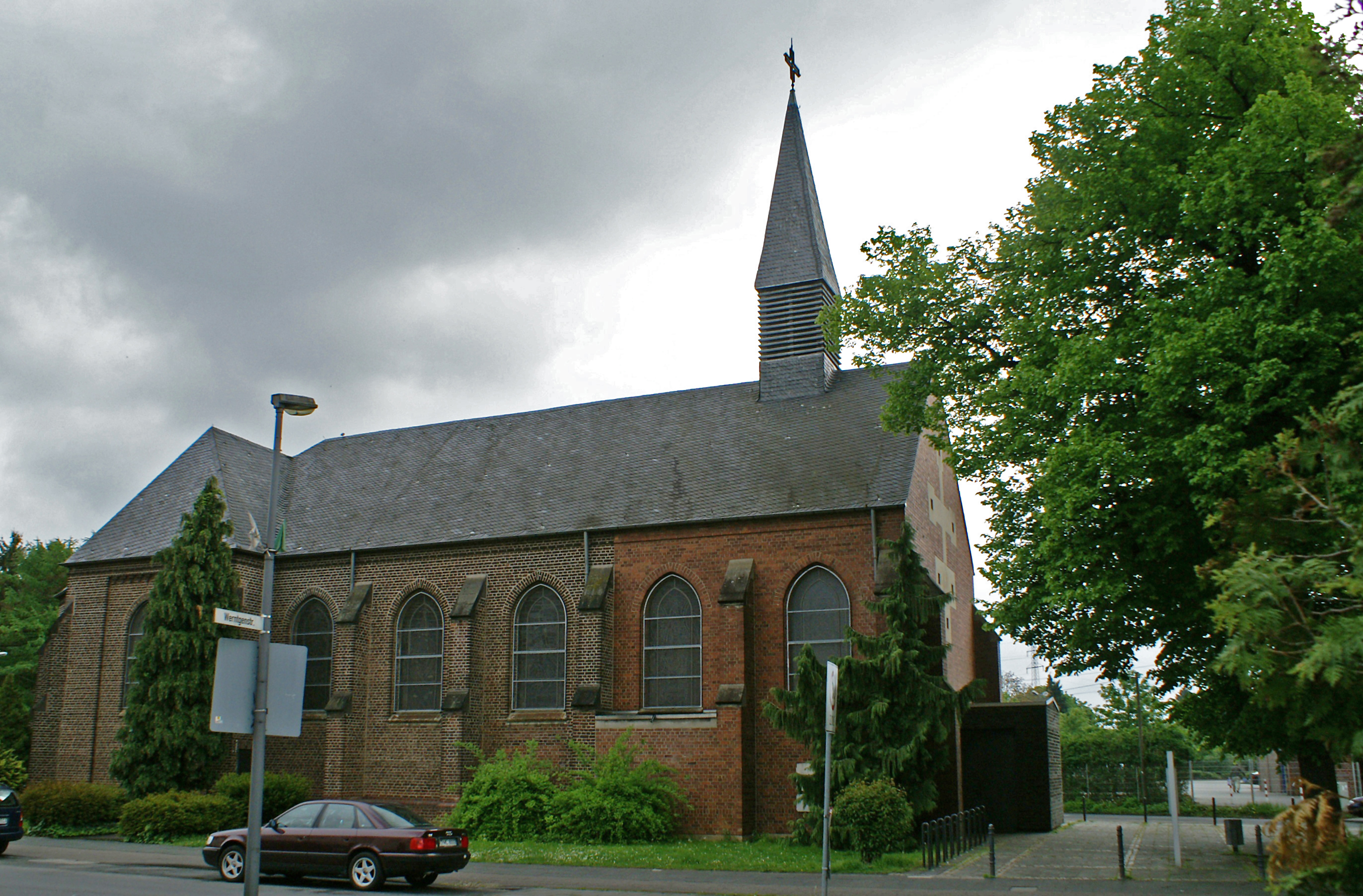
St. Servatius

==== Sacral buildings ====
The neo-Gothic simple brick church of St. Servatius was built in 1906 according to the plans of the diocesan master builder Franz Statz and consecrated on December 23, 1906. From 1962 to 1964 the nave was extended by two bays according to the plans of the architect Kurt Faber. At the end of the reconstruction work, a marble altar from the church of St. Peter in Cologne was taken over. Instead of a tower, a high bell rider was placed on the gable roof of the nave.

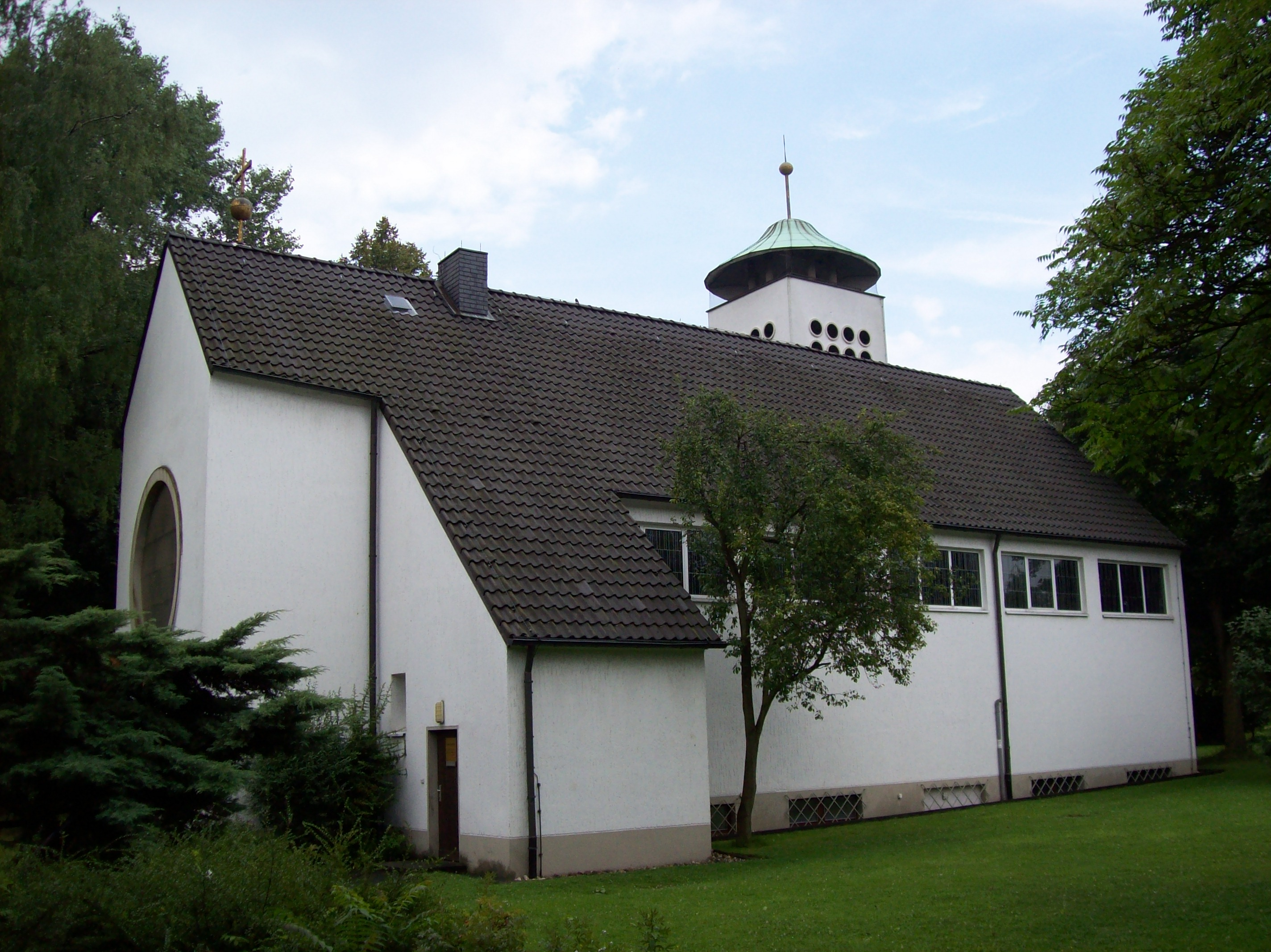
Church of the Resurrection

In 1960/61 the architects Josef Bernard and Fritz Schaller built the simple hall church Zu den Heiligen Engeln on Buchheimer Weg. On the gable roof sits a bell rider with a pointed helmet, which since 1960 has been crowned by an angel made of sheet copper. The seven-stop organ, built in 1868 by the Franz Sonrek company and thoroughly overhauled in 1965, was taken over by St. Servatius in 1977. All the windows of the church were designed by Paul Weigmann from 1986 to 1988.

The Protestant Church of the Resurrection in Heppenheimer Strasse was planned by the Hamburg architect Gerhard Langmaack and consecrated on March 21, 1954, after nine months of construction. The unadorned brick building with a pointed roof is plastered white. The prominent square tower attached to the nave is crowned by a round helmet roof. There are twelve circular openings on each side of the tower to ensure good sound radiation of the chimes.

==== Industrial monument ====
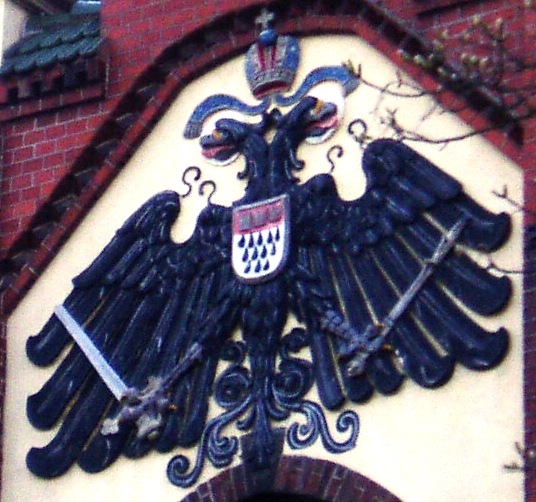
Coat of arms

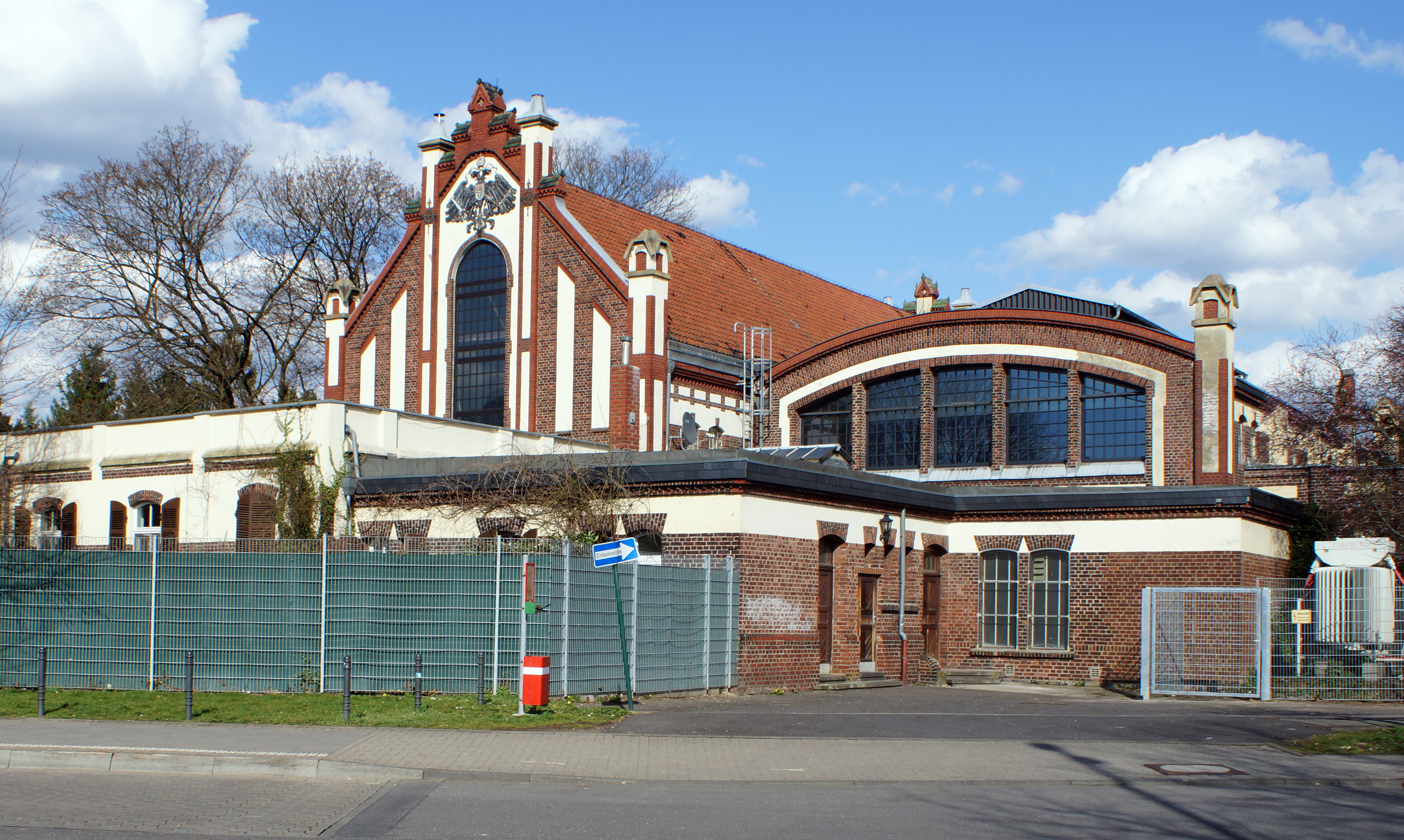
Ostheim power station

The steam–electric power station built by the city of Cologne in 1904 in the immediate vicinity of the light rail station lost its main function, the supply of electricity to the surrounding districts, as early as April 1, 1912, because the city concluded a long-term electricity supply contract with Rheinische AG für Braunkohlebergbau und Brikettfabrikation. Today, it serves as an electrical substation for RheinEnergie AG to feed electricity into the Cologne stadtbahn network. The Cologne public transport company uses parts of the building as a building yard. Another part of the building serves as an artist's studio. The gable walls are decorated with the old Cologne coat of arms. The coat of arms on the back shows twelve flames in the lower field instead of the heraldically correct eleven.

==== Milestone ====
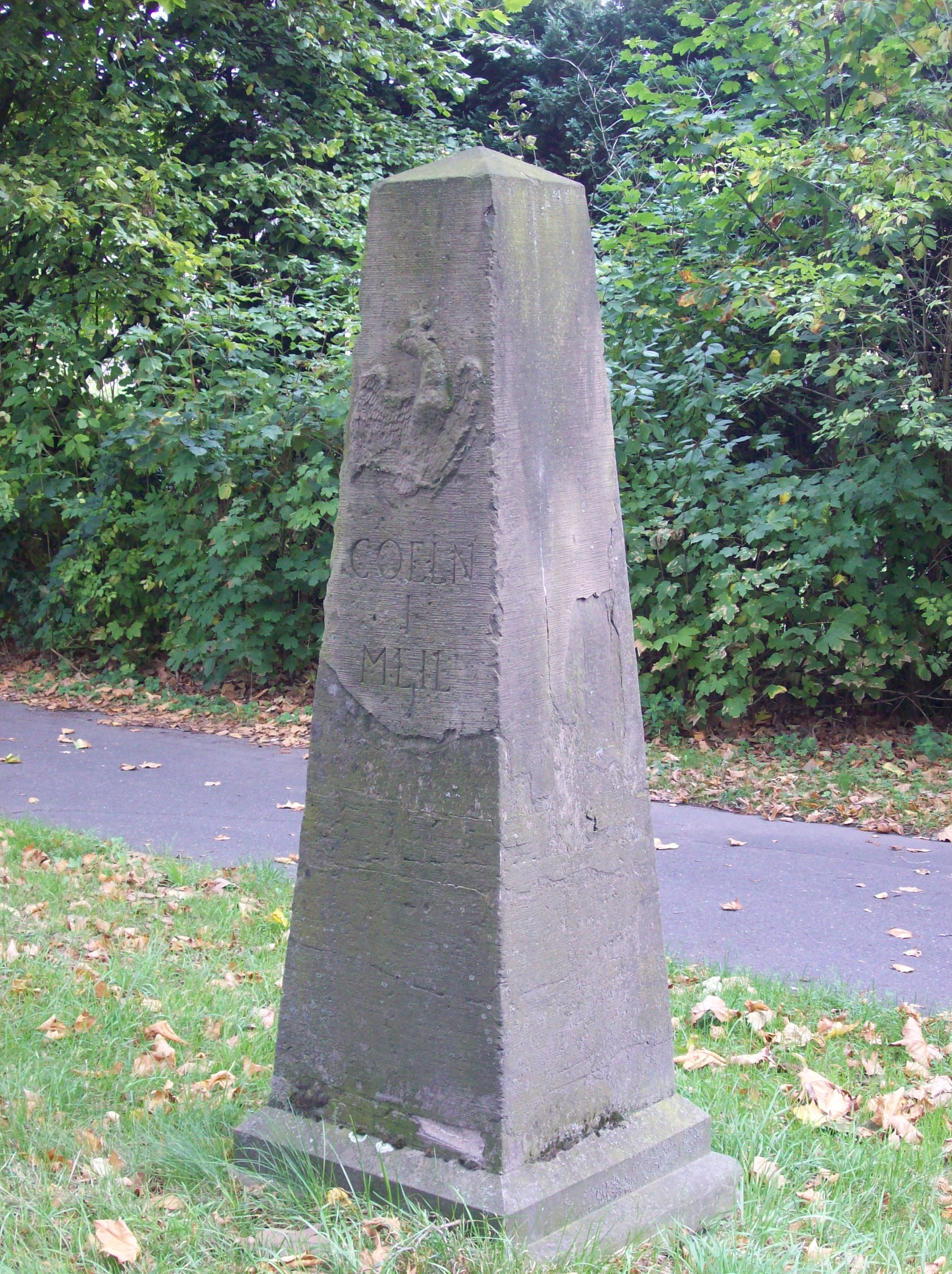
Milestone

In 1818, a Prussian all-mile obelisk made of trachyte stone was erected at the corner of Bensheimer Street and Frankfurter Street. From this milestone the distance to Cologne is one Prussian mile (7532,48 m). Due to the soft stone, the monument is heavily weathered and in need of restoration. During an earlier restoration attempt, the last "e" of mile was removed, so the inscription below the Prussian eagle now reads, "Cöln 1 Meil."

==== Profane buildings ====
On the Gutshof Plantage at Frankfurter Straße 912, newly built in 1850 by the Cologne metal wholesaler Clemens Schmits, agriculture has not been practiced since the early 1990s. The Hardtgenbuscher Hof, which was demolished, stood on the same site before 1850. The estate was used by merchant Schmits as a country residence "in the countryside". The buildings used for agriculture were leased. A corner balcony with iron lattices was added to the residential building of the farm, which provided an overview of the Gute Große Plantage, which was popular with urban hobby hunters. A tire dealer, a concrete pump rental company, and a few other small businesses have set up shop in the preserved brick buildings.

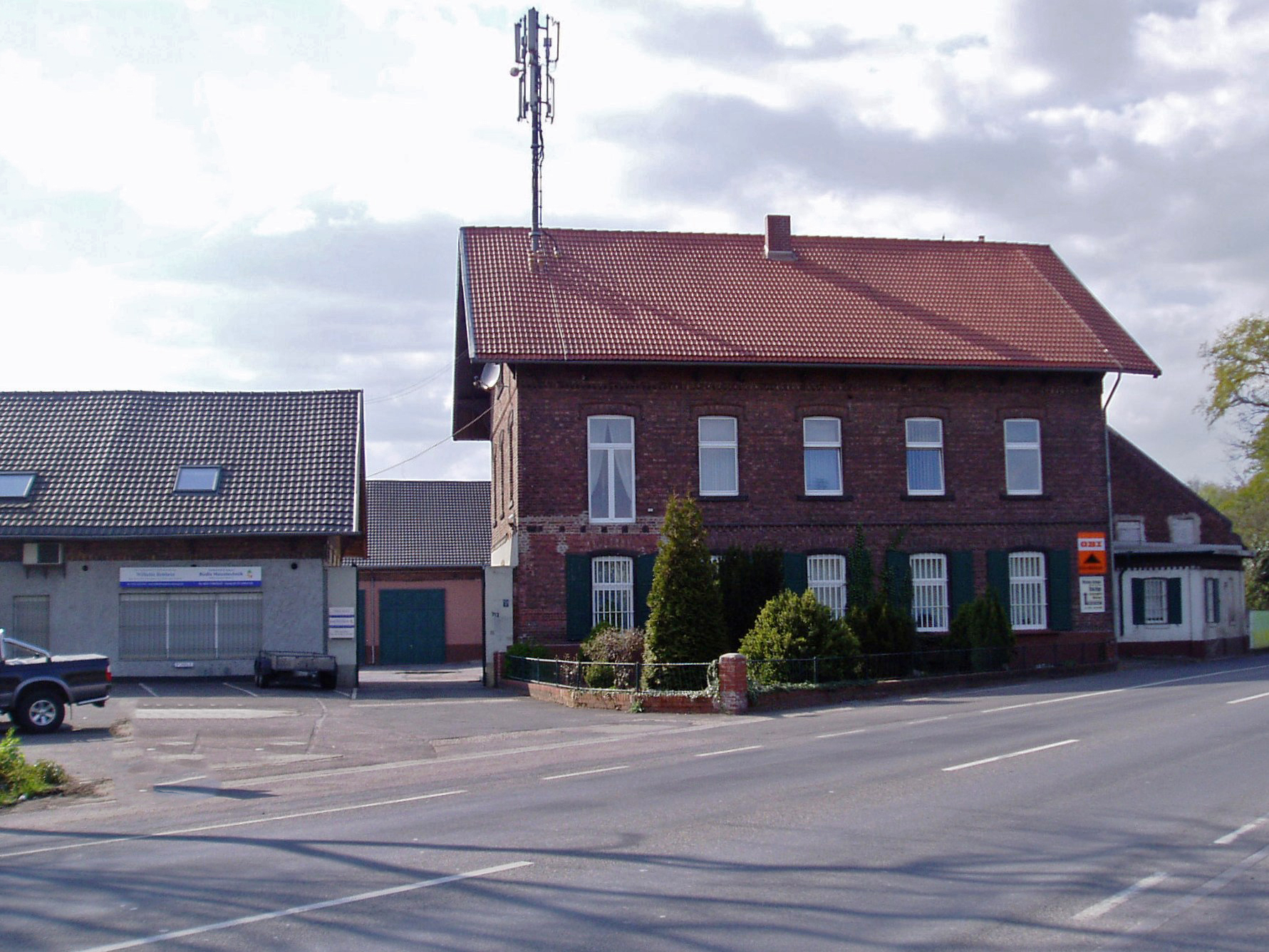
Plantation farm

The listed manor house of the Meierhof at Zehnthofstraße 61, built in 1846, was renovated in the 1990s and converted into housing suitable for senior citizens. The other parts of the courtyard complex were demolished at the same time and replaced by new buildings. Mistakenly, this farm building is often confused with the Zehnthof, which burned down at the end of the 19th century. The residential building and a farm building of the former Bauernhof Lussem at Zehnthofstraße 75 are also still completely preserved.

== Personalities ==
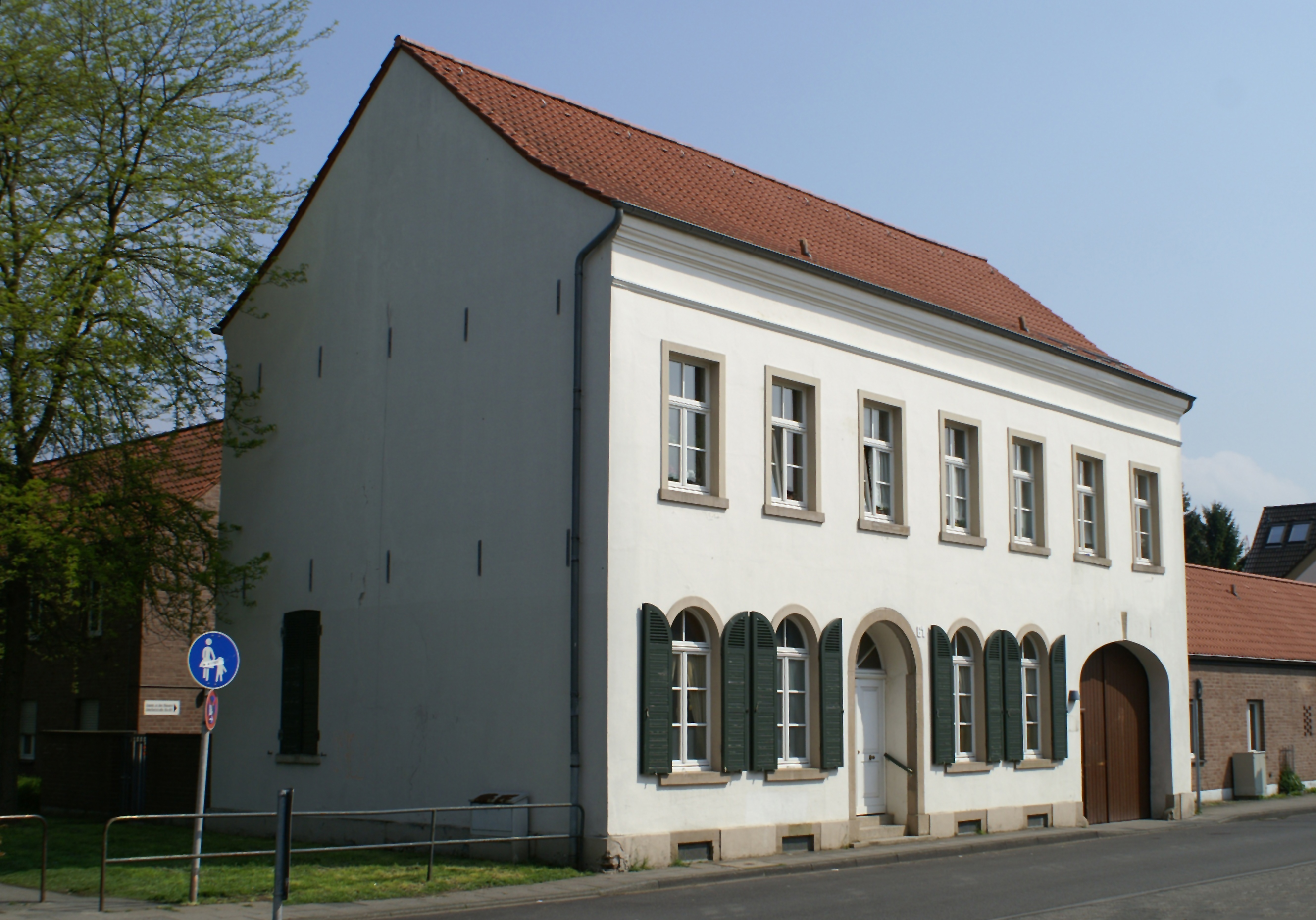
Manor house of the Meierhof

- Manuel Andrack (* 1965), editor, presenter and author, grew up in Ostheim
- Gerhard Bork (1917-2004), church musician
- Michael Buthe (1944-1994), painter and sculptor, lived and worked in Ostheim
- Oswald Gilles (1926-2020), choir director
- Baymirza Hayit (1917-2006), historian
- Carolin Kebekus (* 1980), comedian, grew up in Ostheim
- Helmut Kickton (* 1956), church musician, born in Cologne-Ostheim
- Udo Kier (* 1944), film actor, lived in Ostheim until the mid-1990s
- Marcel Odenbach (* 1953), video artist, lives and works in Ostheim
- Herbert Rösler (1924-2006), artist, founded the group 91 in Ostheim
- Christian Sickel (1958-2022), author and management consultant, grew up in Ostheim
- Gustav Adolf Theill (1924-1997), church musician at the Church of the Resurrection in Cologne-Ostheim
- Ron-Robert Zieler (* 1989), German professional and national soccer player, grew up in Ostheim

== Bibliography ==
- Johann Bendel, Heimatbuch des Landkreises Mülheim am Rhein, Geschichte und Beschreibung, Sagen und Erzählungen, Köln-Mülheim 1925
- Geschichts- und Heimatverein Rechtsrheinisches Köln, ed. (1985), Rechtsrheinisches Köln – Jahrbuch für Geschichte und Landeskunde, vol. 11, Köln: Eigenverlag
- Geschichts- und Heimatverein Rechtsrheinisches Köln, ed. (1996), Rechtsrheinisches Köln – Jahrbuch für Geschichte und Landeskunde, vol. 22, Köln: Eigenverlag
- Christian Schuh: Kölns 85 Stadtteile: Geschichte, Daten, Fakten, Namen; von A wie Altstadt bis Z wie Zündorf, Emons, Köln 2003, ISBN 3-89705-278-4
- Gerd J. Pohl: Ostheim (Essay), Lantershofen 2006
