= Deutz Technische Hochschule station =

Railway station in Cologne, Germany

Coordinates: 50°56′11″N 6°59′11″E

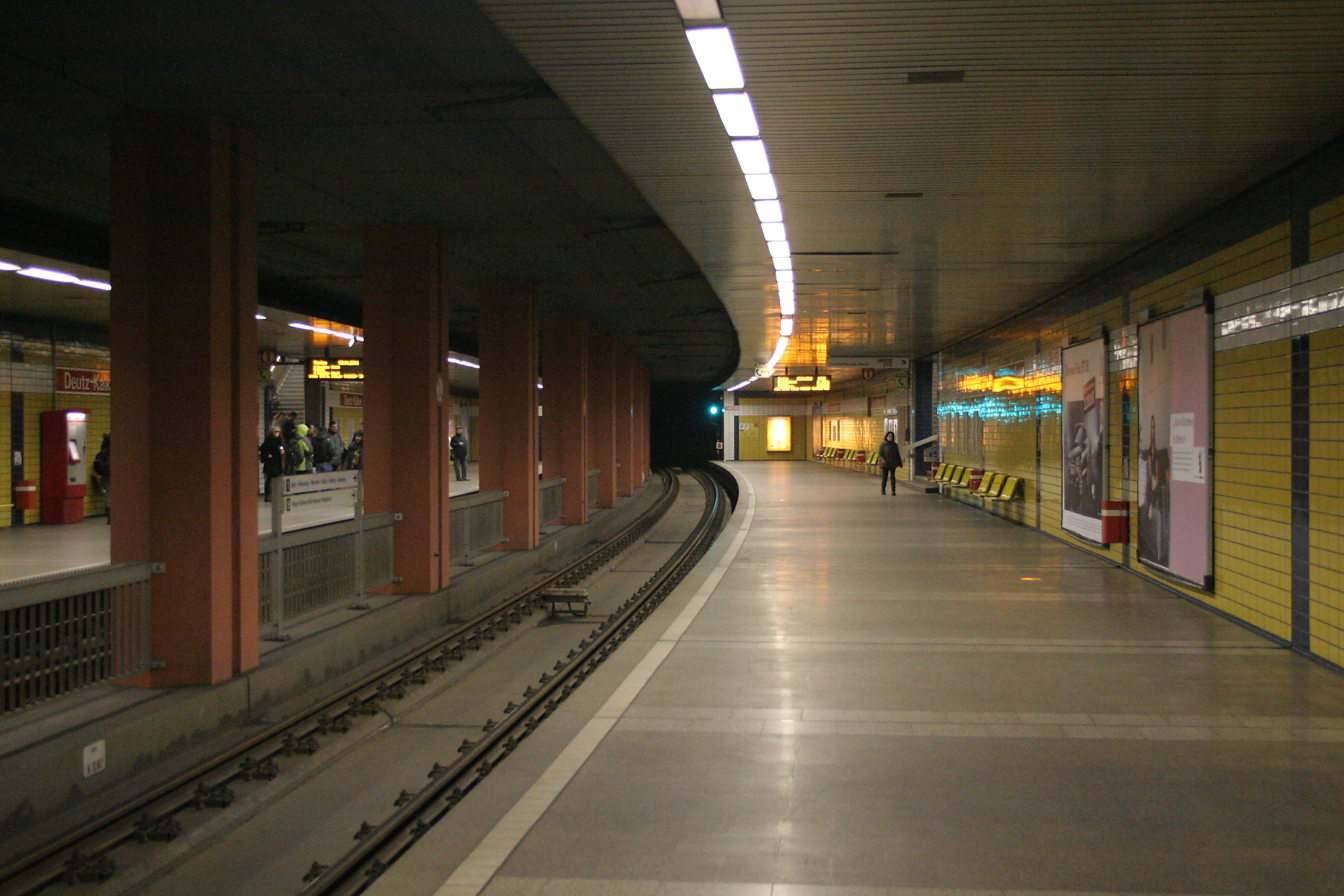
The station in 2010

Deutz Technische Hochschule is an underground station on the Cologne Stadtbahn lines 1 and 9, located in the Cologne district of Deutz. The station lies on Deutz-Kalker Straße.

The station was opened in 1983 and consists of two side platforms with two rail tracks.

| Preceding station | Cologne Stadtbahn | Following station |
|---|---|---|
| Köln Messe/Deutz towards Köln-Weiden West | Line 1 | Kalk Post towards Bensberg |
| Köln Messe/Deutz towards Sülz Hermeskeiler Platz | Line 9 | Kalk Post towards Königsforst |

== Notable places nearby ==
- Lanxess Arena
- Cologne University of Applied Sciences

== See also ==
- List of Cologne KVB stations
