= Kalk Kapelle station =

Railway station in Cologne, Germany

Kalk Kapelle
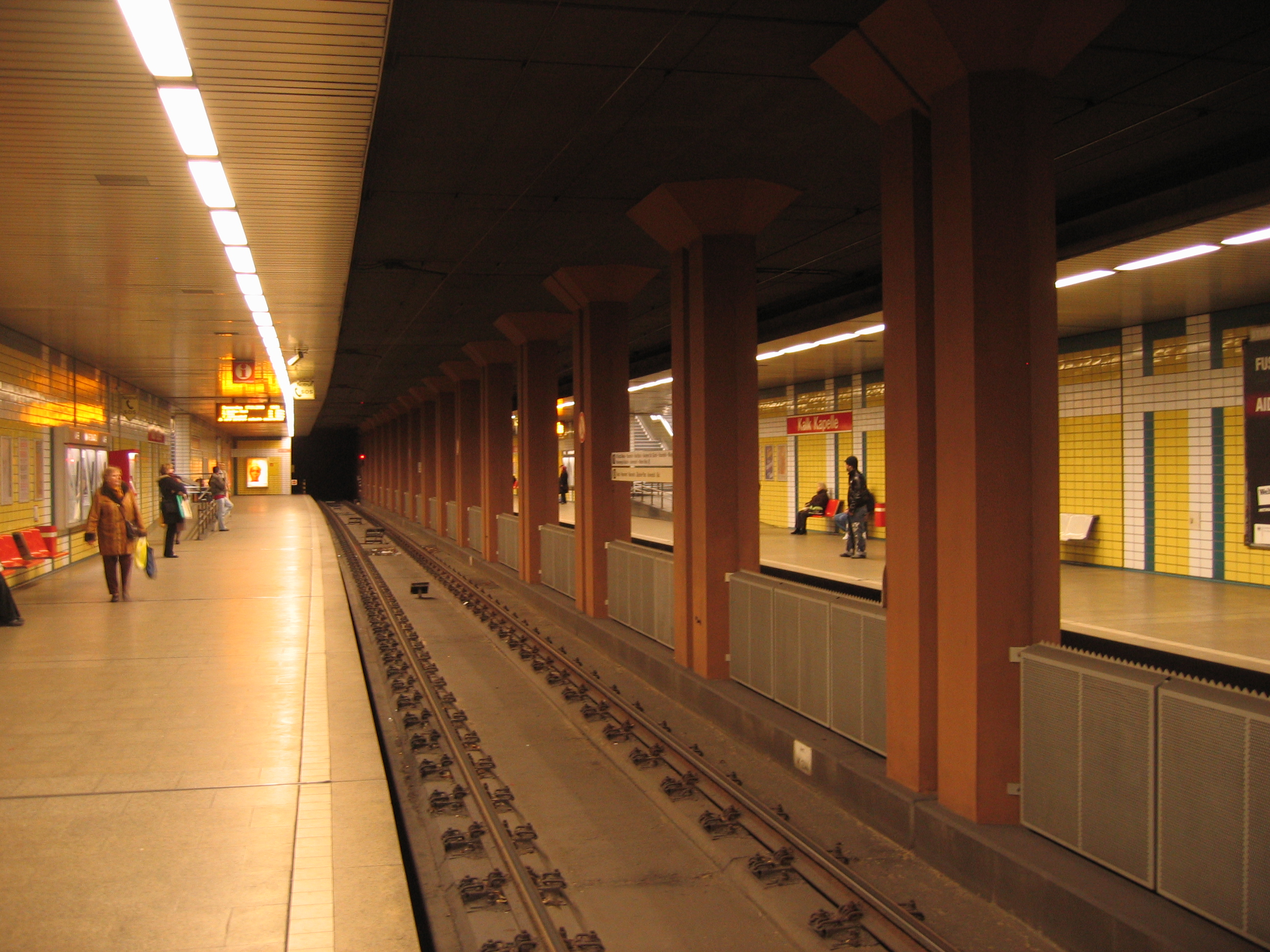
- Kalk Kapelle station

General information
- Location: Kalker Hauptstraße; Cologne
- Coordinates: 50°56′20″N 7°00′32″E
- Owner: Kölner Verkehrs-Betriebe
- Line: Deutz/Kalk tunnel
- Platforms: 2 side platforms
- Connections: KVB: 159, 171, 179

Construction
- Structure type: Underground
- Cycle facilities: Call a Bike
- Accessible: Yes

Other information
- Fare zone: VRS: 2100

History
- Opened: 1980

Services
Preceding station	Cologne Stadtbahn	Following station
Kalk Post towards Köln-Weiden West	Line 1	Fuldaer Straße towards Bensberg
Kalk Post towards Sülz Hermeskeiler Platz	Line 9	Vingst towards Königsforst
Route map
Location

Kalk Kapelle station is an underground station on the Cologne Stadtbahn lines 1 and 9, located in Cologne. The station lies at the intersection if the Kalker Hauptstraße and Kapellenstraße streets in the district of Kalk.

The station was opened in 1980 and consists of a mezzanine and two side platforms with two rail tracks.

== Notable places nearby ==
- Kalk District Town Hall
- Kalk Chapel
- St. Mary's Church, Kalk

== See also ==
- List of Cologne KVB stations
