= Kalk Post station =

Railway station in Cologne, Germany

Kalk Post
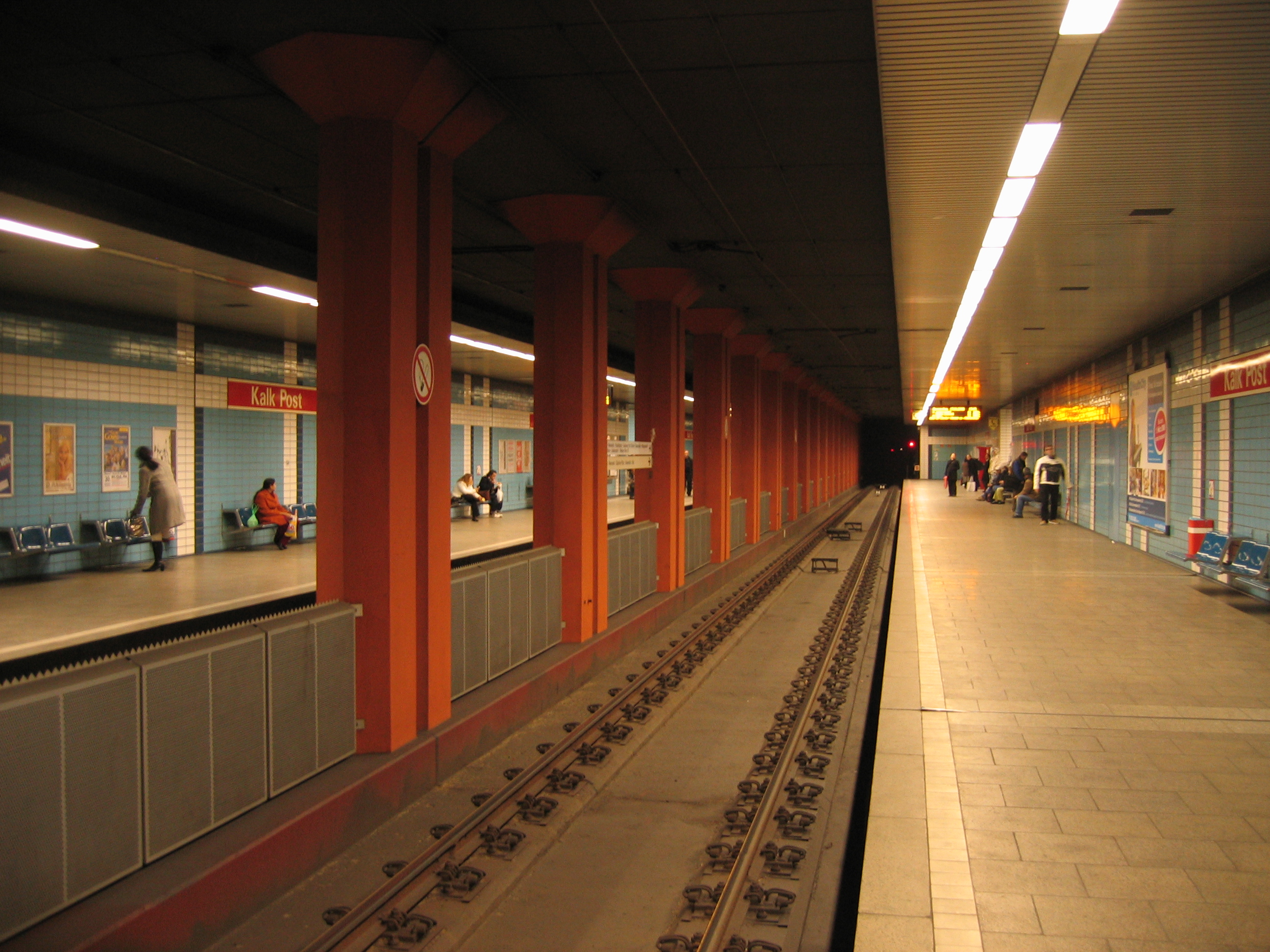
- Kalk Post station

General information
- Location: Kalker Hauptstraße; Cologne
- Coordinates: 50°56′15″N 6°59′54″E
- Owner: Kölner Verkehrs-Betriebe
- Line: Deutz/Kalk tunnel
- Platforms: 2 side platforms
- Connections: KVB: 159, 193

Construction
- Structure type: Underground
- Cycle facilities: Call a Bike
- Accessible: Yes

Other information
- Fare zone: VRS: 2100

History
- Opened: 1980

Services
Preceding station	Cologne Stadtbahn	Following station
Deutz Technische Hochschule towards Köln-Weiden West	Line 1	Kalk Kapelle towards Bensberg
Deutz Technische Hochschule towards Sülz Hermeskeiler Platz	Line 9	Kalk Kapelle towards Königsforst
Route map
Location

Kalk Post is an underground station on the Cologne Stadtbahn lines 1 and 9, located in Cologne. The station lies at the intersection of Kalker Hauptstraße and Trimbornstraße in the district of Kalk. Köln-Trimbornstraße station is located some 200m to the south.

The station was opened in 1980 and consists of a mezzanine and two side platforms with two rail tracks.

== See also ==
- List of Cologne KVB stations
