= Frechen =

- Town
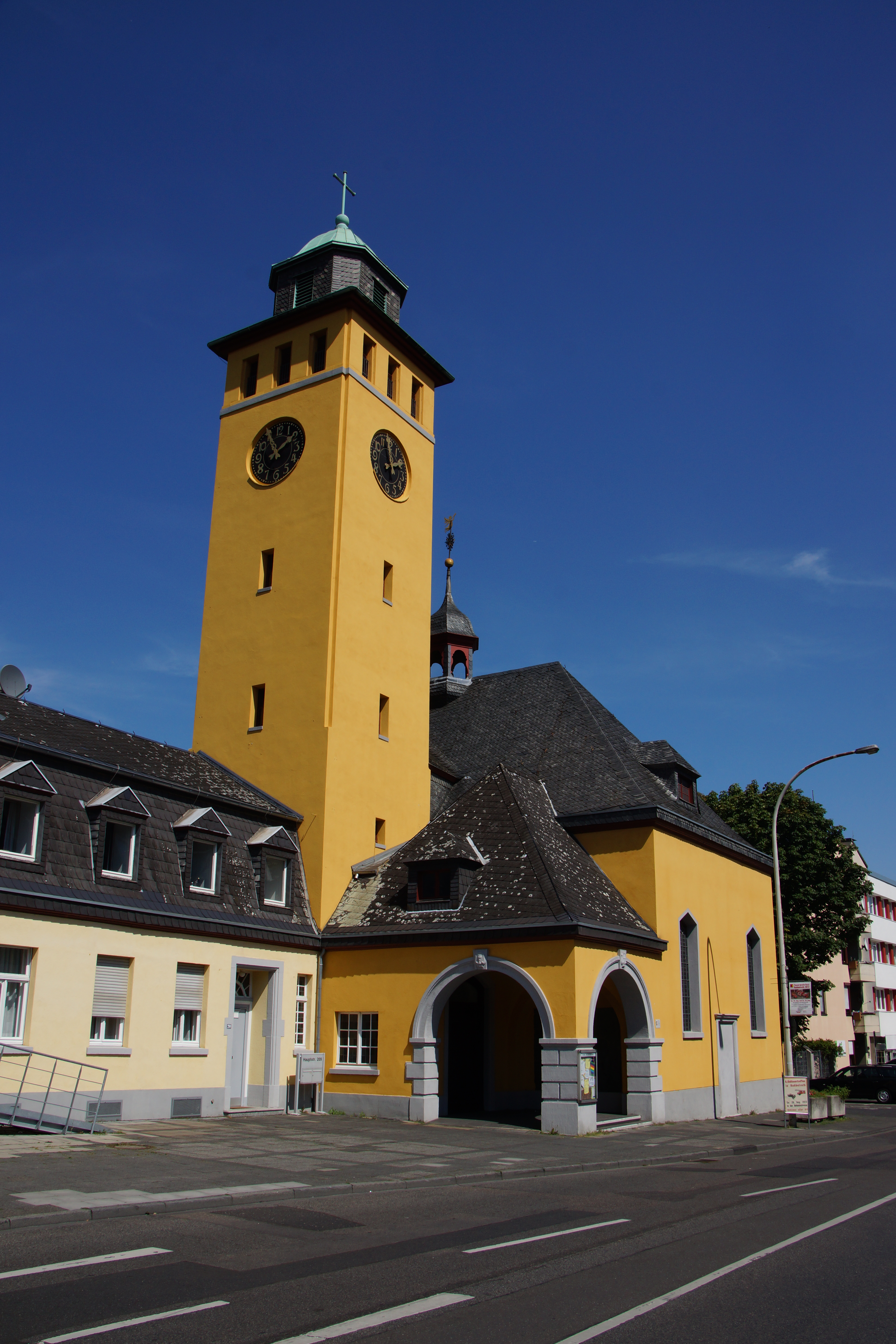
- Protestant church

- Flag Coat of arms

- Location of Frechen within Rhein-Erft-Kreis district
- Interactive map of Frechen
- Location within Germany Location within North Rhine-Westphalia
- Coordinates: 50°55′N 6°49′E
- Country: Germany
- State: North Rhine-Westphalia
- Admin. region: Cologne
- District: Rhein-Erft-Kreis
- Subdivisions: 9

Government
  - Mayor (2025–30): Kai Uwe Tietz (SPD)

Area
  - Total: 45.06 km^{2} (17.40 sq mi)
- Elevation: 58–158 m (190–518 ft)

Population (2025-12-31)
  - Total: 51,927
  - Density: 1,152/km^{2} (2,985/sq mi)
- Time zone: UTC+01:00 (CET)
  - Summer (DST): UTC+02:00 (CEST)
- Postal codes: 50226
- Dialling codes: 02234
- Vehicle registration: BM
- Website: www.stadt-frechen.de

Frechen (German pronunciation: [ˈfʁɛçn̩]; Ripuarian: Frechem) is a town in the Rhein-Erft District, North Rhine-Westphalia, Germany.

== History ==
Frechen was first mentioned in 877 and is situated at the western Cologne city border.

It is the site of the 1257 Battle of Frechen between Conrad von Hochstaden, Archbishop of Cologne and the people of the town. In the 16th century it became known for locally produced terra cotta products, especially the "Bartmannskrug" (beardman jug).

In the late 18th century lignite was industrially mined. Digging for lignite dominated the city's economy until the end of the 20th century, and in 1891 the first briquette factory was opened.

On 2 September 1951 Frechen received its city-rights including the villages of Bachem, Hücheln and Buschbell. On 1 January 1975 the nearby villages of Grefrath, Habbelrath, Königsdorf and Neufreimersdorf were also incorporated.

In 1971, the Keramion, a ceramics museum in a distinctive glass-enclosed modern structure designed by architect Peter Neufert, opened to display the extensive historic and contemporary collection of local collector Gottfried Cremer.

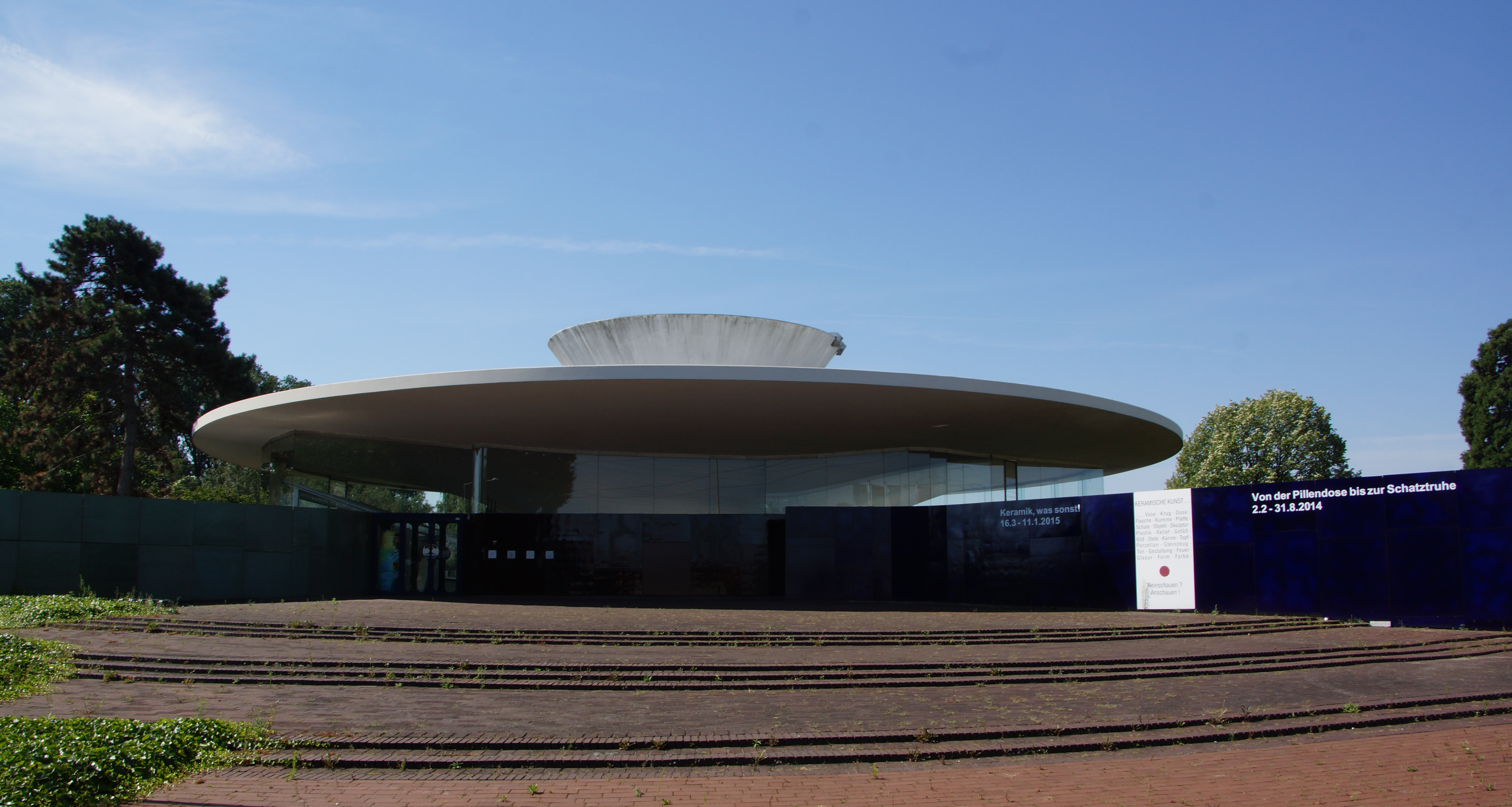
Keramion

From the 1980s onwards an increasing number of industrial, commercial and service enterprises choose Frechen as their location, so that the town changed its features considerably.

== Population ==
Historical population

Year	Pop.	±% p.a.
1965	37,489	—
1970	39,940	+1.27%
1975	41,449	+0.74%
1980	43,471	+0.96%
1985	42,422	−0.49%
1990	44,360	+0.90%
1995	45,583	+0.55%

Year	Pop.	±% p.a.
2000	47,019	+0.62%
2005	48,965	+0.81%
2010	49,939	+0.39%
2015	51,999	+0.81%
2020	51,947	−0.02%
2025	51,927	−0.01%

Source: Landesdatabank Nordrhein-Westfalen

== Local council ==
Elections were held in September 2025.

- CDU: 13 seats
- SPD: 11 seats
- Alliance 90/The Greens: 6 seats
- Perspektive für Frechen: 5 seats
- FDP: 2 seats
- The Left: 2 seats
- BSW: 1 seat
- Alternative für Deutschland: 6 seats

== Notable people ==
- Kirsten Bolm (born 1975), athlete
- Janine Jackowski (born 1976), film producer
- Wayne Carpendale (born 1977), actor and presenter
- Jan Rouven (born 1977), magician and convicted child sex offender
- Pierre Vogel (born 1978), Islamist preacher
- Ayọ (born 1980), soul singer
- Sonja Bertram (born 1984), actress
- Marcel Heller (born 1986), footballer
- Lennart Thy (born 1992), footballer
- Hannah Meul (born 2001), professional rock climber

== Twin towns – sister cities ==
Frechen is twinned with:

- Kapfenberg, Austria

== Transport links ==
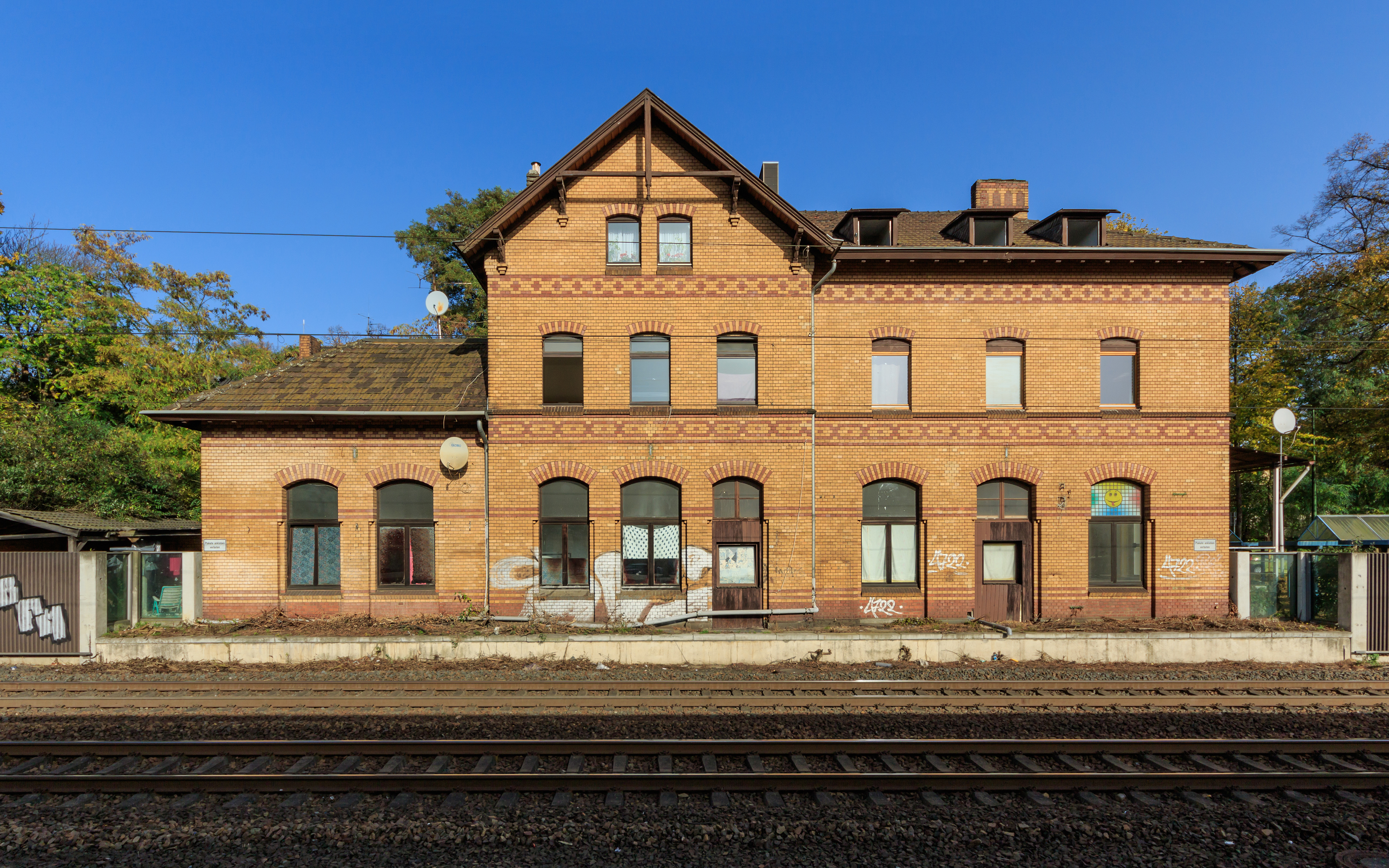
Frechen-Königsdorf station

The lines S12 and S19 of the Cologne S-Bahn have the station Frechen-Königsdorf located here, also the lightrail line 7 of Cologne Stadtbahn goes to Frechen. Frechen is located in the area of the fare association Rheinland-Tarif.
