= Frechen-Königsdorf station =

Railway station in Germany

Frechen-Königsdorf
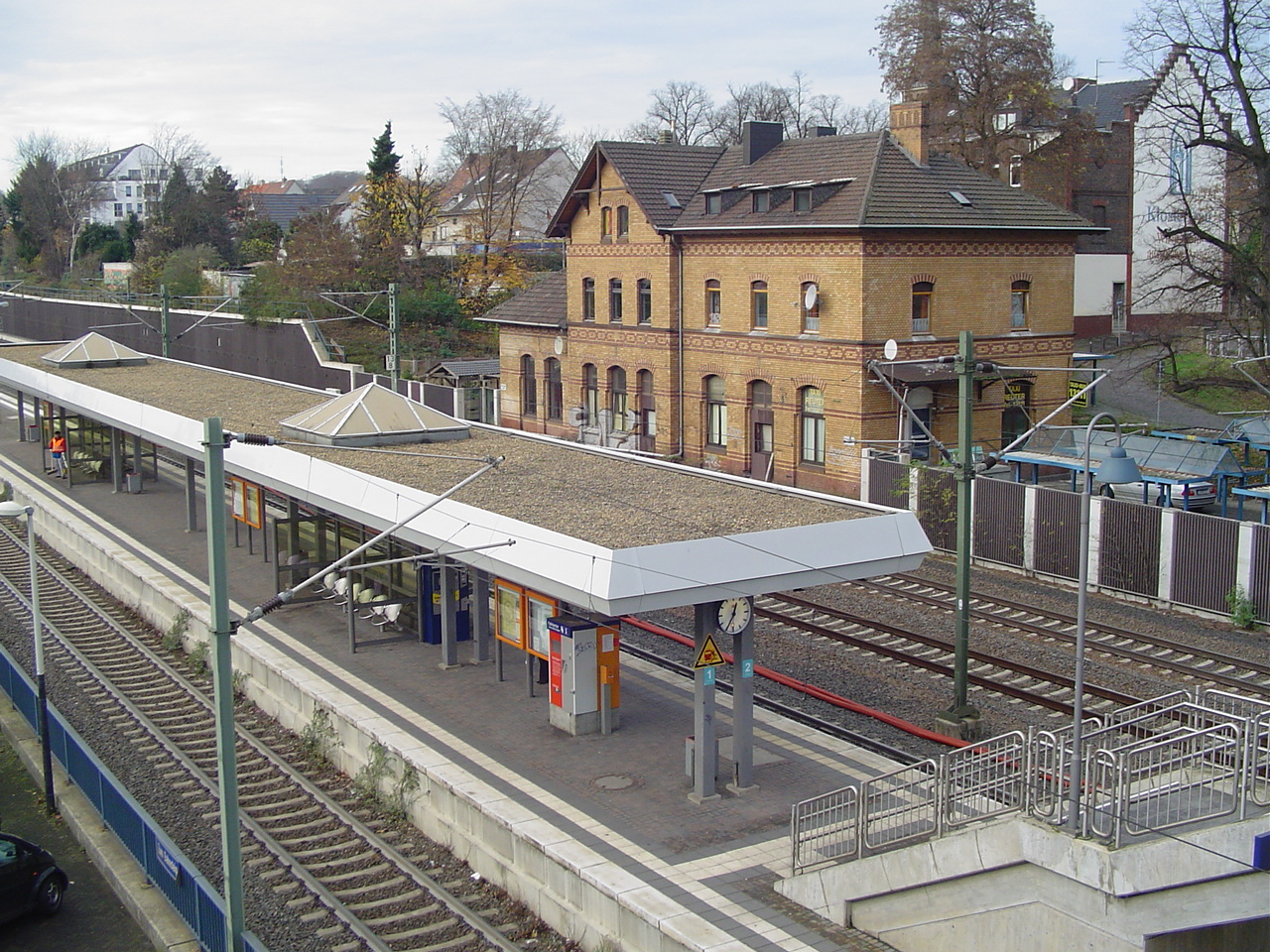

General information
- Location: Aachenerstr. 549, Königsdorf, NRW; Germany
- Coordinates: 50°56′11″N 6°46′38″E
- Lines: Cologne–Aachen (KBS 450.12)
- Platforms: 2

Construction
- Accessible: Yes

Other information
- Station code: 2306
- DS100 code: KFKO
- IBNR: 8002389
- Category: 5
- Fare zone: VRS: 2820
- Website: www.bahnhof.de

History
- Opened: 6 September 1841
- Former names: Königsdorf; Großkönigsdorf

Services
Preceding station	Cologne S-Bahn	Following station
Horrem Terminus	S12	Köln-Weiden West towards Au (Sieg)
Horrem towards Düren	S19	Köln-Weiden West towards Au (Sieg)
Location
- Location within North Rhine-Westphalia

Frechen-Königsdorf station is a station in the village of Königsdorf in the German state of North Rhine-Westphalia on the Cologne–Aachen high-speed railway.

The station was opened as Königsdorf on 6 September 1841 on a section of the Cologne–Aachen railway that was opened by the Rhenish Railway Company between Cologne and Müngersdorf at the same time. In the late 19th century, it was renamed Großkönigsdorf. In the 1990s, during the upgrading of the Cologne-Aachen line, Deutsche Bahn renamed Großkönigsdorf station as Frechen-Königsdorf. Since the upgrading of the line to four tracks in 2002, the station has only been served by S-Bahn services.

The station is served by Cologne S-Bahn lines S19 between Düren and Hennef (Sieg), Blankenberg (Sieg), Herchen or Au (Sieg) every 20 minutes Monday–Saturday and S12 between Sindorf or Düren and Troisdorf every 60 minutes Monday–Saturday. Together these provide four services an hour through Cologne on working days and three services an hour on Sunday.
