= Köln-Weiden West station =

Railway station in Cologne, Germany

Köln-Weiden West
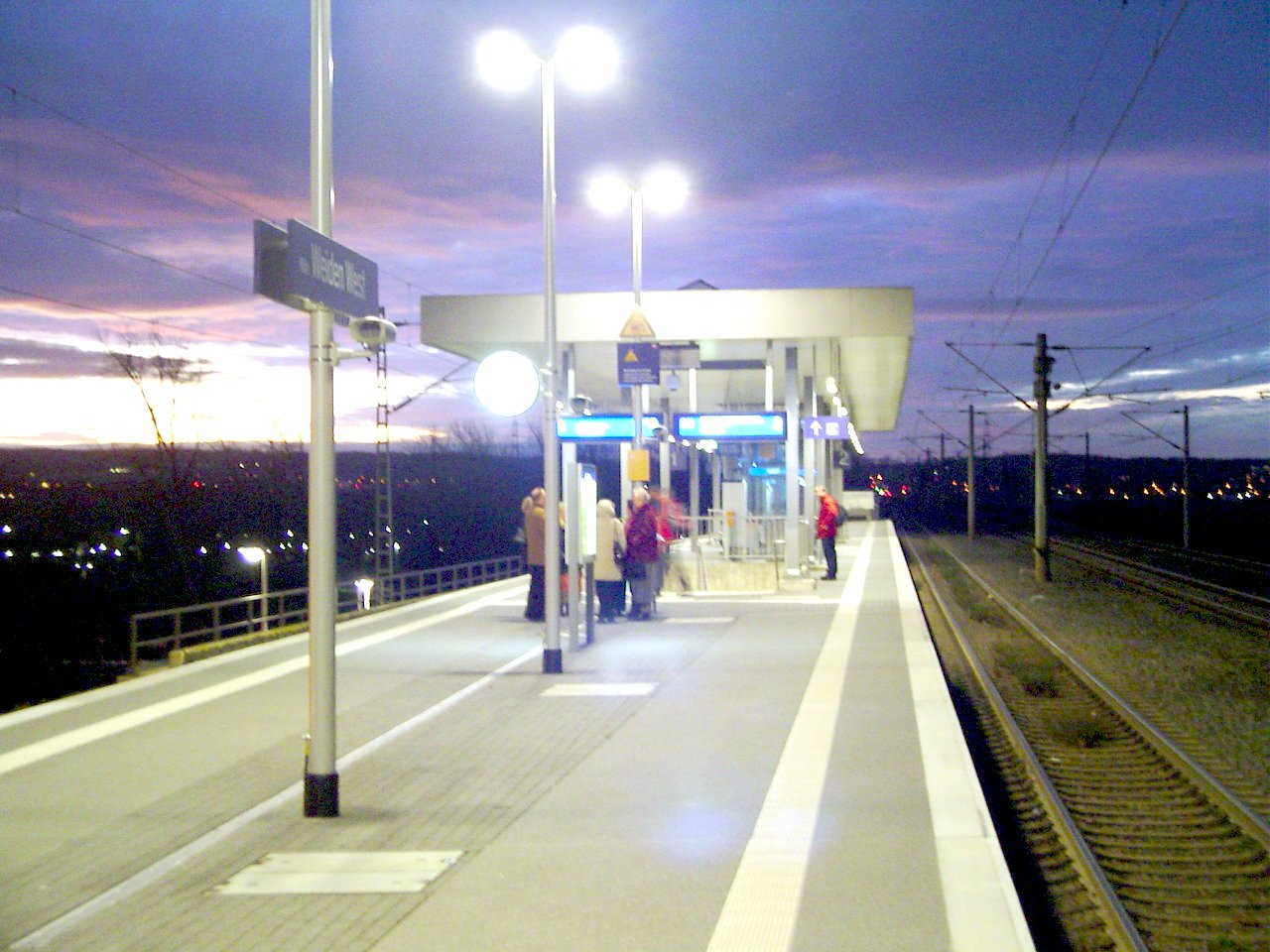

General information
- Location: Bonnstraße, Köln-Weiden West, Cologne, North Rhine-Westphalia; Germany
- Coordinates: 50°56′26″N 6°48′56″E
- Owner: Deutsche Bahn
- Operator: DB Netz; DB Station&Service
- Line: Cologne–Aachen
- Platforms: 2

Construction
- Accessible: yes

Other information
- Station code: 8131
- DS100 code: KKWW
- IBNR: 8003383
- Category: 5
- Fare zone: VRS: 2100 and 2820
- Website: www.bahnhof.de

History
- Opened: 28 May 2006

Services
Preceding station	Cologne S-Bahn	Following station
Frechen-Königsdorf towards Horrem	S12	Köln-Lövenich towards Au (Sieg)
Frechen-Königsdorf towards Düren	S19	Köln-Lövenich towards Au (Sieg)

Other services
Preceding station	Cologne Stadtbahn	Following station
Terminus	Line 1	Weiden Römergrab towards Bensberg
Location
- Location within North Rhine-Westphalia Location within Germany Location within Europe

Köln-Weiden West is a railway station situated at Weiden, Cologne in the German state of North Rhine-Westphalia on the Cologne–Aachen railway. It is classified by Deutsche Bahn as a category 5 station.

== Station ==
The Stadtbahn station is on ground level just south of the line, enabling direct interchange. A light rail trip from Weiden West to the stop at the RheinEnergieStadion takes about ten minutes, so the stop is used by many soccer fans for home games of 1. FC Köln. Many commuters also use the stop because of the nearby Frechen-Nord junction on Autobahn 4. A park and ride (P+R) facility with 430 parking spaces was therefore expanded to 680 parking spaces in 2008 as well as a bike and ride (B+R) faciality. As the occupancy of the parking lot is still very high during the week, a further increase in the number of parking lots is being discussed. According to the City of Cologne, this can only be done by establishing a parking garage since there are no more spaces available for expansion. This would require a grant from the state of North Rhine-Westphalia, which requires long-term planning. The station is barrier free including an elevator, platforms hights of stepless boarding to the trains, tactile paving, acustically announcements and Braille in the elevator.

== History ==
The station was built before the 2006 FIFA World Cup to relief the Stadtbahn trains from RheinEnergie Stadion (part of line 1) to the center of Cologne. When Weiden West was opened, people coming from west of Cologne could change there to the Stadtbahn instead of going via the Central Station of Cologne and use the westbound Stadtbahn to the stadium. It was opened on 28 May 2006 on a section of the Cologne–Aachen railway that was opened by the Rhenish Railway Company between Cologne and Müngersdorf on 6 September 1841. At the same time, line 1 of the Cologne Stadtbahn was extended by about a kilometre to the west and a new terminus was built with four tracks.

== Services ==
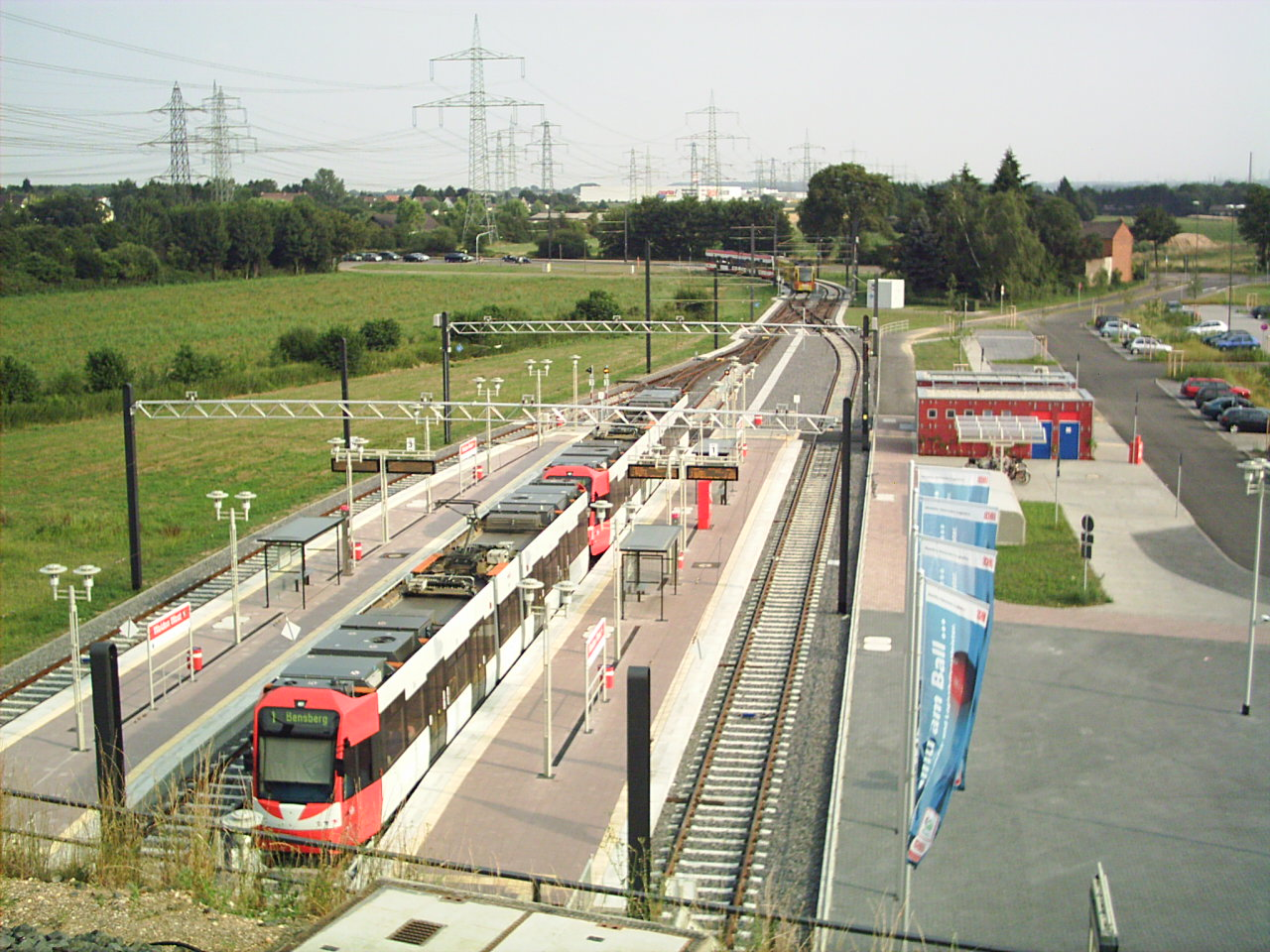
Köln-Weiden West tram station

=== Suburban trains ===
Line	Route	Frequency
S12	Horrem – Köln Weiden West – Köln Messe/Deutz station – Troisdorf – Siegburg/Bonn – Hennef – Au	20 min (Horrem–Hennef) 60 min (Hennef–Au)
S19	Düren – Horrem – Köln Weiden West – Köln Messe/Deutz – Köln/Bonn Airport – Troisdorf – Siegburg/Bonn – Hennef – Au	20/40 min (Horrem–Hennef); 60 min (Hennef–Au)

The station is served by Cologne S-Bahn lines S19 between Düren and Hennef (Sieg), Blankenberg (Sieg), Herchen or Au (Sieg) every 20 minutes Monday–Saturday and S12 between Sindorf or Düren and Troisdorf every 60 minutes Monday–Saturday. Together these provide four services an hour through Cologne on working days and four services an hour on Sunday.

=== Light rail ===
	route	length	avg. speed
1	Weiden West – Weiden Römergrab – Rhein-Center – Junkersdorf – Neumarkt – Köln Messe/Deutz station – Kalk Post – Kalk Kapelle – Brück – Refrath – Bensberg during peak hours 5-minute intervals Junkersdorf–Brück	26.5 km (16.5 mi)	

KVB-line 1 runs from Weiden West station to Bensberg station in Bergisch Gladbach.

=== City busses ===
There is also connection to the city bus lines no. 141 and SB91.

=== Other means of transport ===
A cab rank, a Park and Ride (P+R) and a Bike and Ride (B+R) faciality are located at the station
