= Bensberg station =

Railway station in Bensberg, Germany

Bensberg
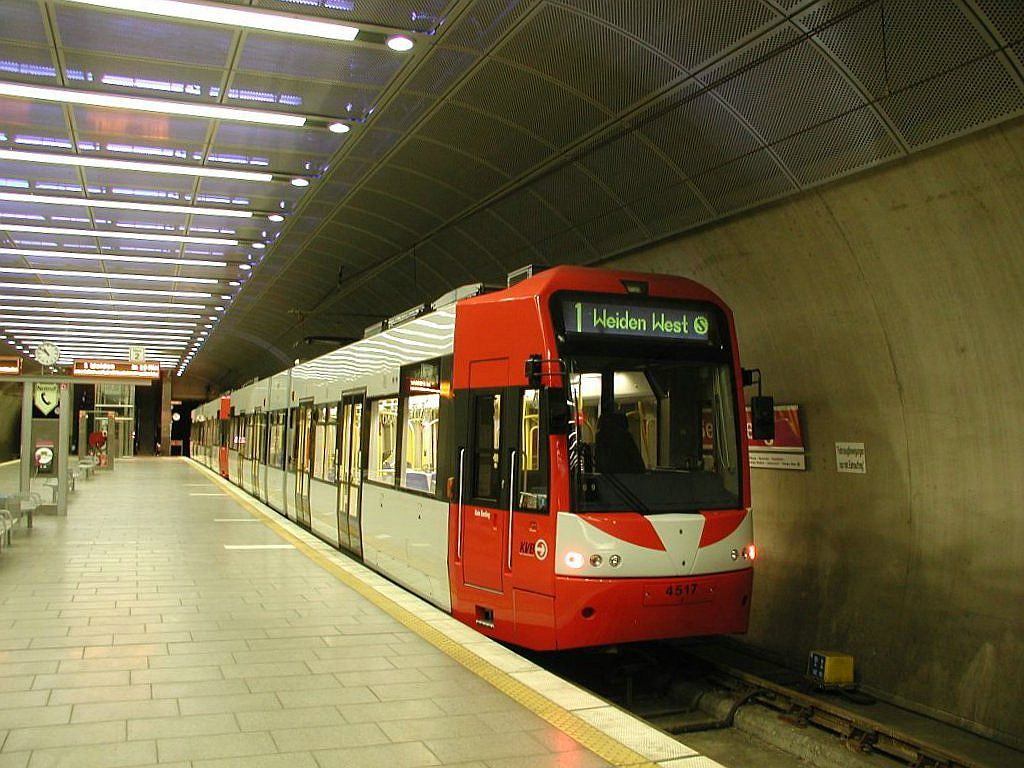
- Bensberg station

General information
- Location: Steinstraße, 51469 Bergisch Gladbach
- Coordinates: 50°57′50″N 7°09′41″E
- Owner: Kölner Verkehrs-Betriebe
- Platforms: 1 island platform
- Connections: Bus, Taxi

Construction
- Structure type: Underground
- Accessible: Yes

Other information
- Fare zone: VRS: 2310

History
- Opened: 2000

Services
Preceding station	Cologne Stadtbahn	Following station
Im Hoppenkamp towards Köln-Weiden West	Line 1	Terminus
Route map
Location

Bensberg is an underground and terminus station on the Cologne Stadtbahn line 1, located in Bergisch Gladbach. The station lies at Steinstraße in the district of Bensberg.

The station was opened in 2000 and consists of a mezzanine and one island platform with two rail tracks.

== Notable places nearby ==
- Bergisches Museum für Bergbau
- Schloss Bensberg

== See also ==
- List of Cologne KVB stations
