= Königsforst station =

Railway station in Cologne, Germany

Königsforst
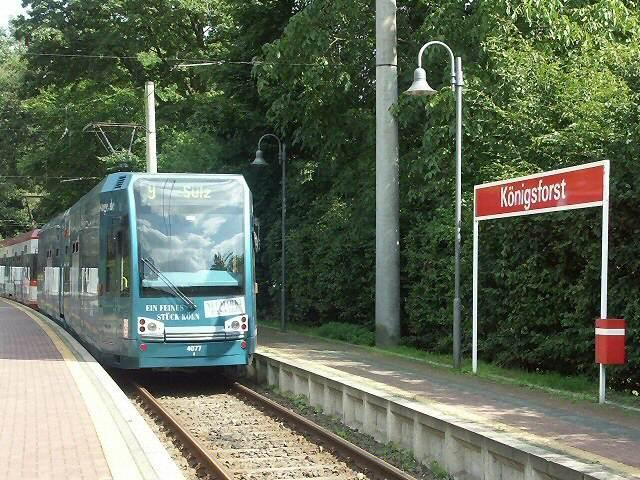
- Königsforst station

General information
- Location: Rösrather Straße, 51107 Köln
- Coordinates: 50°55′11″N 7°05′48″E
- Owner: Kölner Verkehrs-Betriebe
- Platforms: 1 bay platform, 2 side platforms
- Connections: Bus, Taxi, Bike and Ride (B+R)

Construction
- Structure type: At grade
- Cycle facilities: Call a Bike
- Accessible: Yes

Other information
- Fare zone: VRS: 2100

History
- Opened: 27 August 1904

Services
Preceding station	Cologne Stadtbahn	Following station
Röttgensweg towards Sülz Hermeskeiler Platz	Line 9	Terminus
Route map
Location

Königsforst is a terminus station on the Cologne Stadtbahn line 9, located in Cologne. The station lies in Rath/Heumar in the district of Kalk.

The station was opened on 27 August 1904 and today consists of two side platforms and one bay platform with together two rail tracks.

== See also ==
- List of Cologne KVB stations
- Königsforst
