= S13 (Cologne S-Bahn) =

Line S 13 was an S-Bahn line of the S-Bahn Köln network. It was operated by DB Regio with class 423 electric multiple units.

At peak times, the S13 services began or end at Düren and run via Cologne to Troisdorf. In the off peak, half the S13 trains began or end at Sindorf. It ran with line S12 for most of its route, splitting from it only to run through Cologne/Bonn Airport. On working days, two services operated every hour (20 or 40 minutes apart) and together with an hourly service on line S19, services operated at 20-minute intervals. Between the peaks the S12, S13 and S19 services provided a service every 10 minutes on the central section between Köln-Ehrenfeld and Köln-Trimbornstraße.

It operated every 60 minutes on Saturdays, Sundays and public holidays between Düren and Troisdorf; lines S13 and S19 jointly provided a service every 30 minutes. The S12, S13 and S19 services provided a service every 15 minutes on the central section between Köln-Ehrenfeld and Köln-Trimbornstraße.

== Route ==
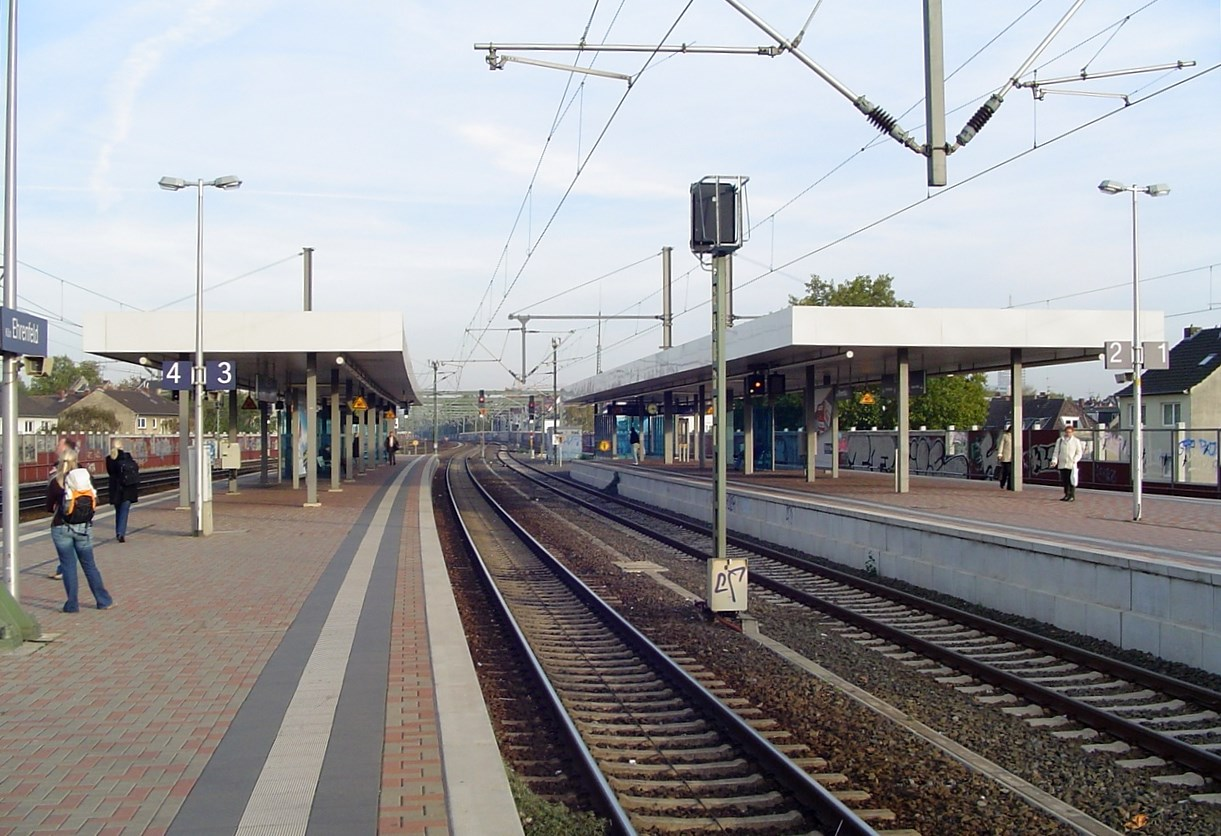
Köln-Ehrenfeld station

The route runs on the Cologne–Aachen line (opened by the Rhenish Railway Company between Cologne and Düren in three stages between 1839 and 1841), the East Rhine Railway (opened to Troisdorf by the Rhenish Railway in 1870, with an extension to Cologne opened in 1874) and the Cologne Airport loop (opened in 2004). The western section of the S 13 service from Düren to Köln Messe/Deutz was opened on 15 December 2002. The eastern section was extended to Troisdorf on 13 June 2004. An extension from Troisdorf to Bonn-Oberkassel via Bonn-Beuel has been under construction since 2016.

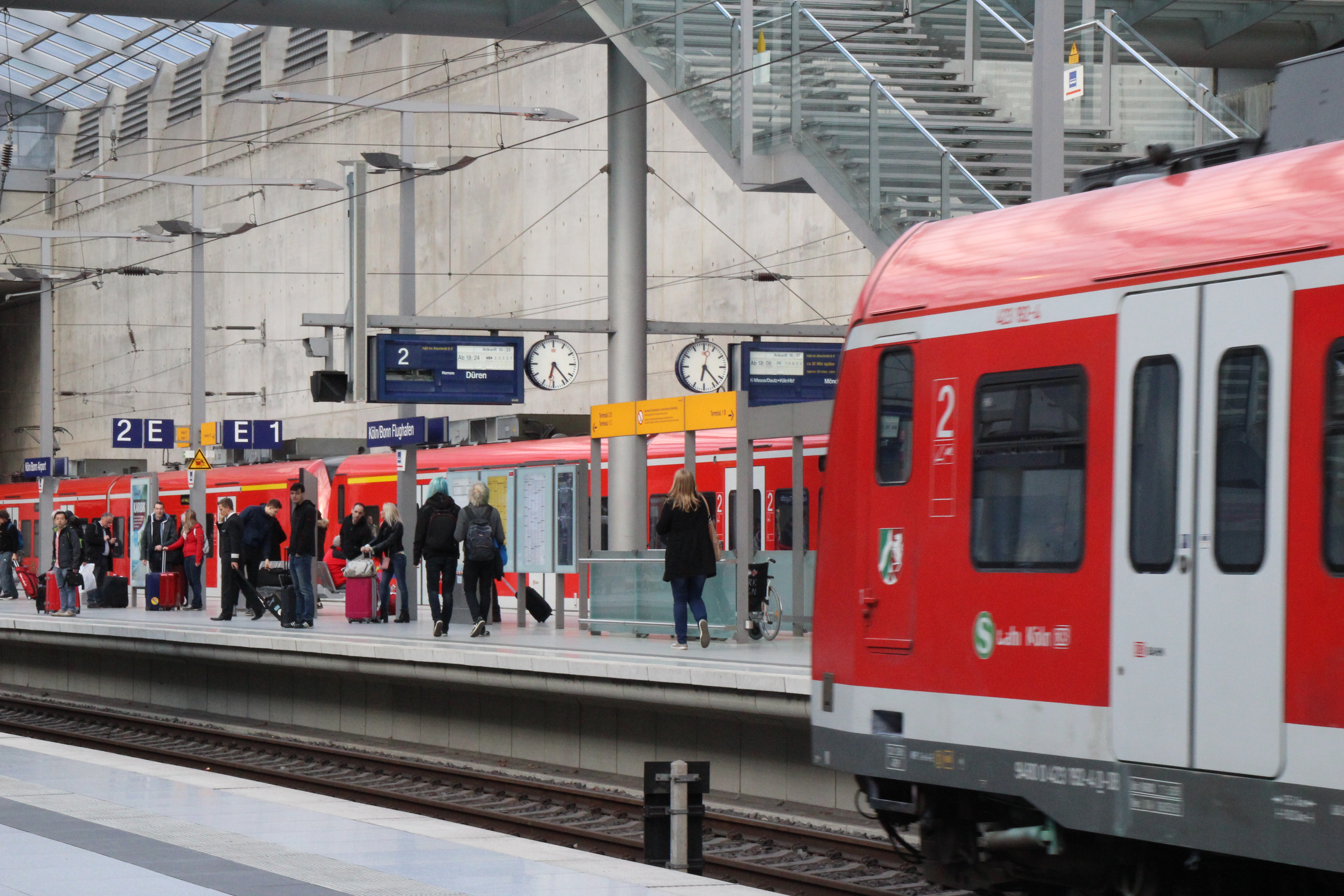

== Recent Events ==
In December 2020 the S13 got fully replaced by the S19, which was extending some courses of the S13 at the time. On workdays and Saturdays the S12 and S19 form a 10 minute interval between Köln-Ehrenfeld and Hennef and a 30 minute interval between Hennef and Au (Sieg). However, the S13 will be reintroduced after constructing the extension of the railway between Troisdorf and Bonn-Beuel (– Bonn Oberkassel) which is likely going to happen in 2026. The S13 will operate separately from the S19 between Bonn-Beuel and Düren in a 20 minute interval. The S19 will operate between Au (Sieg) and Köln Nippes every 20 minutes, offering nine courses in each direction between Troisdorf and Cologne (S12: 3 courses, S13: 3 courses, S19: 3 courses).
