= Köln Frankfurter Straße station =

Railway station in Germany

Köln Frankfurter Straße
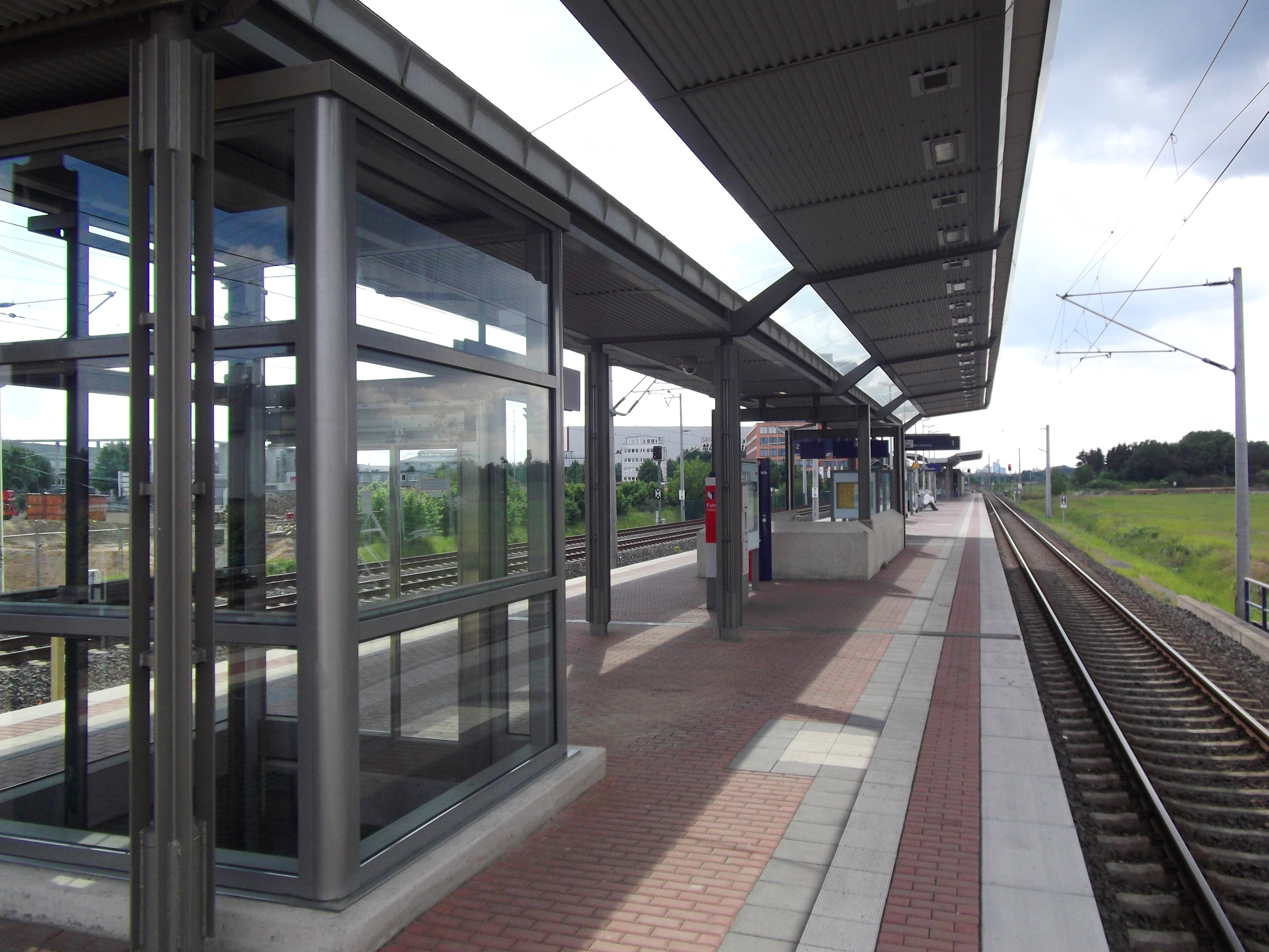
- Station building

General information
- Location: Frankfurter Str., Köln Frankfurter Str., Cologne, NRW; Germany
- Coordinates: 50°54′56″N 7°03′10″E
- Lines: Cologne Airport Loop; Cologne–Overath railway
- Platforms: 2

Construction
- Accessible: Yes

Other information
- Station code: 5343
- DS100 code: KKFS
- Category: 4
- Fare zone: VRS: 2100
- Website: www.bahnhof.de

History
- Opened: 13 June 2004

Services
Preceding station	DB Regio NRW	Following station
Köln Trimbornstraße towards Köln Hansaring	RB 25	Rösrath-Stümpen towards Lüdenscheid
Preceding station	Cologne S-Bahn	Following station
Köln Trimbornstraße towards Düren	S19	Cologne/Bonn Airport towards Au (Sieg)
Location
- Location within North Rhine-Westphalia

Köln Frankfurter Straße is a station situated at Gremberghoven, Cologne in western Germany on the Cologne Airport Loop and the Cologne–Overath railway. It was opened with the Cologne Airport loop on 13 June 2004.

It is served by the S19 services of the Cologne S-Bahn, which run at 20-minute intervals on weekdays and every 30 minutes on the weekend. It is classified by Deutsche Bahn as a category 4 station.
