= KDI =

KDI or kdi may refer to:

- Korea Development Institute, a South Korean government agency
- Gummersbach-Dieringhausen station, Germany (DS100:KDI)
- Haluoleo Airport, Kendari, Indonesia (IATA:KDI)
- Kumam dialect, spoken in Uganda (ISO 639-3:kdi)
