= Cologne–Overath railway =

Overview
- Line number: 2655 (Köln-Kalk–Overath); 2621 (Köln-Kalk–Flughafen Nordost); 2692 (Flughafen Nordost–Frankfurter Str)
- Locale: North Rhine-Westphalia, Germany

Service
- Route number: 459

Technical
- Track gauge: 1,435 mm (4 ft 8 1/2 in) standard gauge

The Cologne–Overath railway is a single-track, non-electrified railway in the German state of North Rhine-Westphalia. It was opened in 1910 to connect the historic Siegburg–Olpe railway directly to Cologne and required the construction of the Hoffnungsthal tunnel. The section from Hoffnungsthal to Rösrath partly used the track of the Cologne–Lindlar railway, which is now largely disused west of Bergisch Gladbach. The line, like the Siegburg–Olpe line, is also called the Aggertalbahn (Agger Valley Railway), although it leaves the valley of the Agger not far from Overath.

In 1997, Deutsche Bahn abandoned scheduled freight traffic throughout the Oberbergischer Kreis. After that passenger services ran only as far as Gummersbach, but, since 2003, they have been extended to Marienheide. Since May 2007, the Rhein-Sieg-Eisenbahn has occasionally operated freight traffic as required from the junction of the Siegburg–Olpe railway with the Wiehl Valley Railway (Wiehltalbahn) towards Cologne.

== History ==
The planners of the Siegburg–Olpe railway preferred a direct connection to Cologne from the beginning rather than the indirect route via Siegburg. But at this time, there was still a military base in Cologne, which was in the way of the line. When this site was closed, the line to Cologne was soon planned.

In order to significantly shorten the travel time from Cologne to the Oberbergische district, the connection between Hoffnungsthal and Overath, including the 1,087 m-long Hoffnungsthal tunnel between Hoffnungsthal and Honrath and the connection from Rosrath to Cologne, were completed in 1910. The new line used part of the Sülz Valley Railway at Hoffnungsthal to connect the two extensions together.

=== Since the construction of the connection to Cologne ===
As in many other places there were disruptions to the line after the Second World War. Hitler's scorched-earth policy required a temporary diversion over the old line via Siegburg. This was made necessary by the destruction of a bridge between Overath and Cologne by German troops during their retreat. This bridge was repaired in 1946 and trains were then diverted on to the line via Olpe, because the main line to Siegen was much more damaged. This detour lasted until 1949. In these difficult years the line was also used by many of the starving urban population to buy food (on Hamsterfahrten, literally “hamster rides”). Automatic Block Signaling was implemented the line from Köln-Kalk to Dieringhausen on the Siegburg–Olpe line in 1976.

The line was also affected by the increasing motorisation and a systematic reduction in services by the Bundesbahn and other rationalisation leading to losses of passengers. At the beginning of the 1980s, after the closures of the Agger Valley Railway between Lohmar and Overath and Dieringhausen and Olpe, the remaining line was at risk of being closed. The railway workshop on the Agger Valley Railway was closed in 1982 and from then on rollingstock was serviced in Cologne.

As the line was still seen as having potential for passenger traffic, the three lines between Cologne and Meinerzhagen were used in 1984 as the test track for an experimental City-Bahn service using specially painted trains. This service ran from Cologne via Overath and continued as the only passenger service on the remaining section of the Siegburg–Olpe railway to Dieringhausen and then continued on the Volme Valley Railway (Volmetalbahn) via Gummersbach and Marienheide to Meinerzhagen. The result was a sudden increase in passenger numbers. However, the passenger service from Marienheide to Meinerzhagen was closed in 1986 as was the passenger service from Gummersbach to Marienheide on 30 May 1987.

In 1989, the City-Bahn sets were withdrawn for the advance operation of the S 12 S-Bahn service between Cologne and Au (Sieg), which formally commenced in 1992, but regular-interval services were maintained. Since 1999, only modern class 644 (Bombardier Talent) diesel multiple units have run on the line.

Since 1991, the Oberbergische Bahn has run in Cologne on the newly built S-Bahn trunk line on the Köln Hansaring–Cologne Hauptbahnhof–Köln Messe/Deutz–Köln Trimbornstraße route. During the construction of the Cologne-Frankfurt high-speed railway, the route was changed once again in Cologne. Shortly after Köln-Frankfurter Straße station, which opened in 2004, the line forks to Overath and via Cologne/Bonn Airport station to Troisdorf.

In 2003, the signal boxes in Ründeroth, Dieringhausen and Gummersbach were closed. There is now no local signals staff on the line, except in Engelskirchen where one last mechanical signal box remains to guard a level crossing. The total line is remotely controlled from Cologne-Deutz.

Since 20 April 2003, passenger services have again run to Marienheide.

In recent years, there have been few improvements in service along the route. In February 2009, it was announced that Overath would have a modern passenger information system with LCD train destination indicators, which was installed in May 2010 and now supplies information about delays and outages. The announced reconstruction of Dieringhausen station (on the Volme Valley Railway) to provide barrier-free access has still not been implemented.

Currently it is planned to convert the passenger operations into Rhine-Ruhr S-Bahn line S 14 from 2015. This will combine the RB 25 service with the RB 24 (Eifel-Bahn) service on the Eifel Railway. This line re-uses a historical route, because once there was a regional rail service from Jünkerath on the Eifel line to Rösrath.

== Condition ==
While some station buildings have been renovated in recent years with the support of the city, others are privately owned and used as residences. Thus the Overath station building was completely renovated in 2008 and serves the city as a Kulturbahnhof ("culture station"). In addition to a facility of Regionalverkehr Köln (a regional bus operators owned by various municipalities), the building houses a newly opened restaurant and rooms for social and cultural events. Several other station building, such as Honrath and Porz-Heumar, are privately owned. The buildings are in good condition and have been converted into residential accommodation. Some other entrance buildings still serve only for railway purposes and seem to be in a moderate condition. Since the closure of the ticket offices, the function of the buildings, however, is severely limited.

Porz-Heumar station, which is located in a large residential area, is now just used for train operations (the shunting of freight trains from the nearby waste transfer station) as the Regionalbahn services to Marienheide have not stopped there since the 1980s. The station is used for passengers only if there are operational problems or road closures.

== Rollingstock ==
In 1984, ten class 218 locomotives of the Hagen depot were repainted to match some Silberling carriages in pure orange (RAL 2004) with a pebble grey belly band for the CityBahn project and were used as push–pull trains in regular intervals services on the Cologne–Meinerzhagen route. These sets were only used on this line and later for the advance operation of the S 12 S-Bahn service between Cologne and Au (Sieg), which commenced in 1992.

Since 1999, services on the route have mainly been provided by diesel-electric multiple units of class 644 (Bombardier Talent) in double or triple traction. They are sometimes relieved by class 643 sets (also Talents) which were originally procured by Euregiobahn and are appropriately labelled. Since 2012, some trips have again been made with class 218 locomotives and Silberling carriages.

== Rail services ==
Today the line from Cologne via Overath and Dieringhausen is operated as part of the Rhine-Sieg S-Bahn with a Regionalbahn service (RB 25: Oberbergische Bahn) over the Agger Valley Railway and Volme Valley Railway to Marienheide:

- Köln Hansaring via Cologne Central Station, Köln Messe/Deutz, Overath, Dieringhausen and Gummersbach to Marienheide at hourly intervals, and
- between Cologne and Overath every 30 minutes.

Fares on the whole route are set by the Verkehrsverbund Rhein-Sieg (Rhine-Sieg Transport Authority, VRS).

Rail services on the lines used by the Oberbergische Bahn along with the Eifelbahn and the Voreifelbahn were advertised in 1997 by the VRS. DB Regio NRW won the tender.

In November 2009, tenders for the operations of the line from 15 December 2013 until 2028 was let. Meinerzhagen is specified as the terminus of the RB 25 service.
