= Gummersbach station =

Railway station in Gummersbach, Germany

Gummersbach
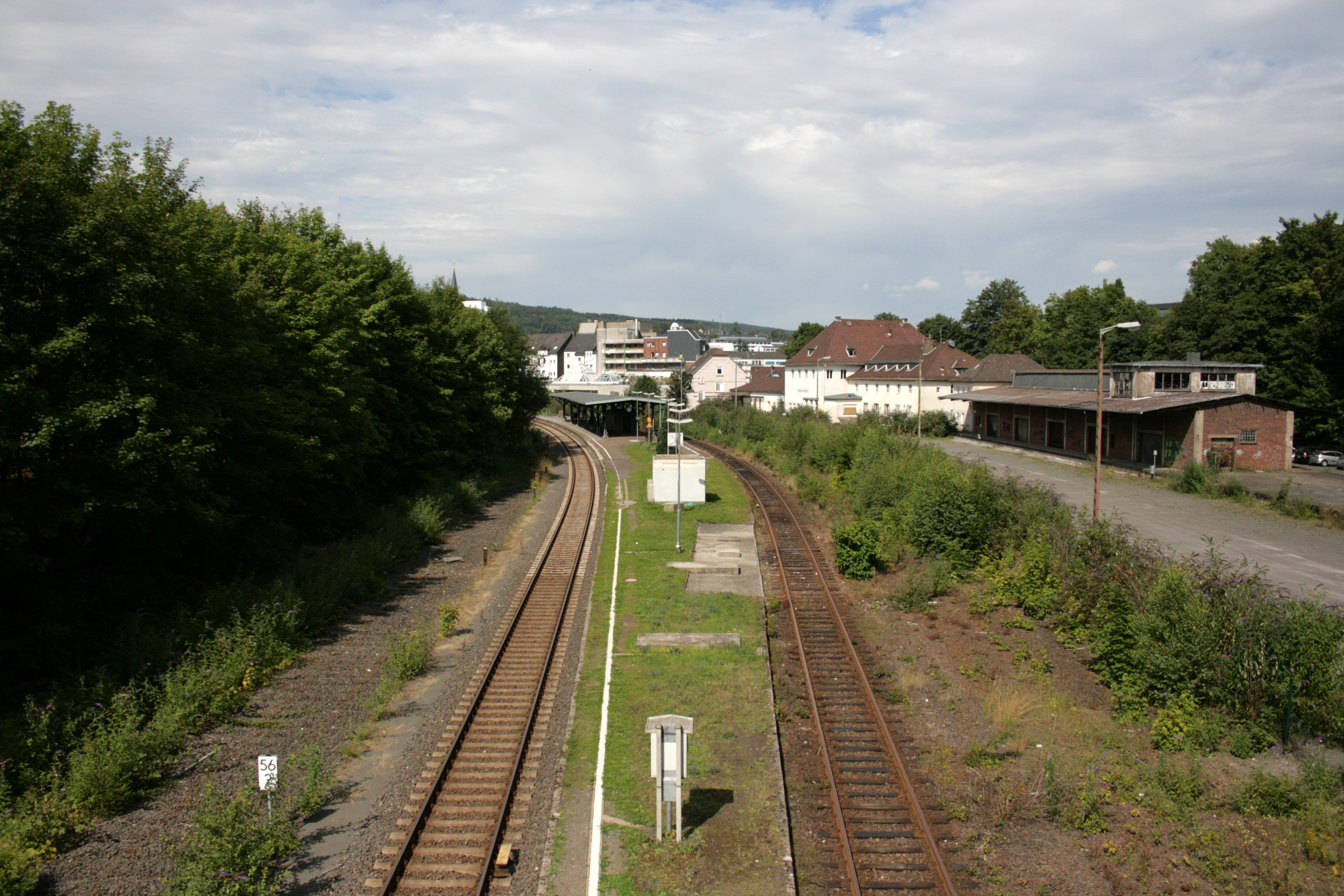

General information
- Location: Bahnhofstr. 12, Gummersbach, NRW; Germany
- Coordinates: 51°01′24″N 7°34′01″E
- Owner: Deutsche Bahn
- Operator: DB Netz; DB Station&Service
- Line: Hagen–Dieringhausen railway
- Platforms: 2

Construction
- Accessible: Yes

Other information
- Station code: 2410
- DS100 code: KGU
- IBNR: 8002462
- Category: 5
- Fare zone: VRS: 2480
- Website: www.bahnhof.de

History
- Opened: 1 July 1893

Services
Preceding station	DB Regio NRW	Following station
Dieringhausen towards Köln Hansaring	RB 25	Marienheide towards Lüdenscheid
Location
- Location within North Rhine-Westphalia Location within Germany Location within Europe

Gummersbach station is on the Hagen–Dieringhausen railway and serves central Gummersbach in the Oberbergische district. Until the 1980s, Dieringhausen station, which is also in Gummersbach, was more important for the city as it had a rail workshop and was a railway junction. Gummersbach station only became more important with the closing of branch lines in the Oberbergische district and the associated loss of significance for Dieringhausen.

Lack of traffic means that the tracks are now reduced to the basics. The station's buildings were torn down in January 2012 in preparation for road works after years of disuse and new covered platforms were built.

== History ==
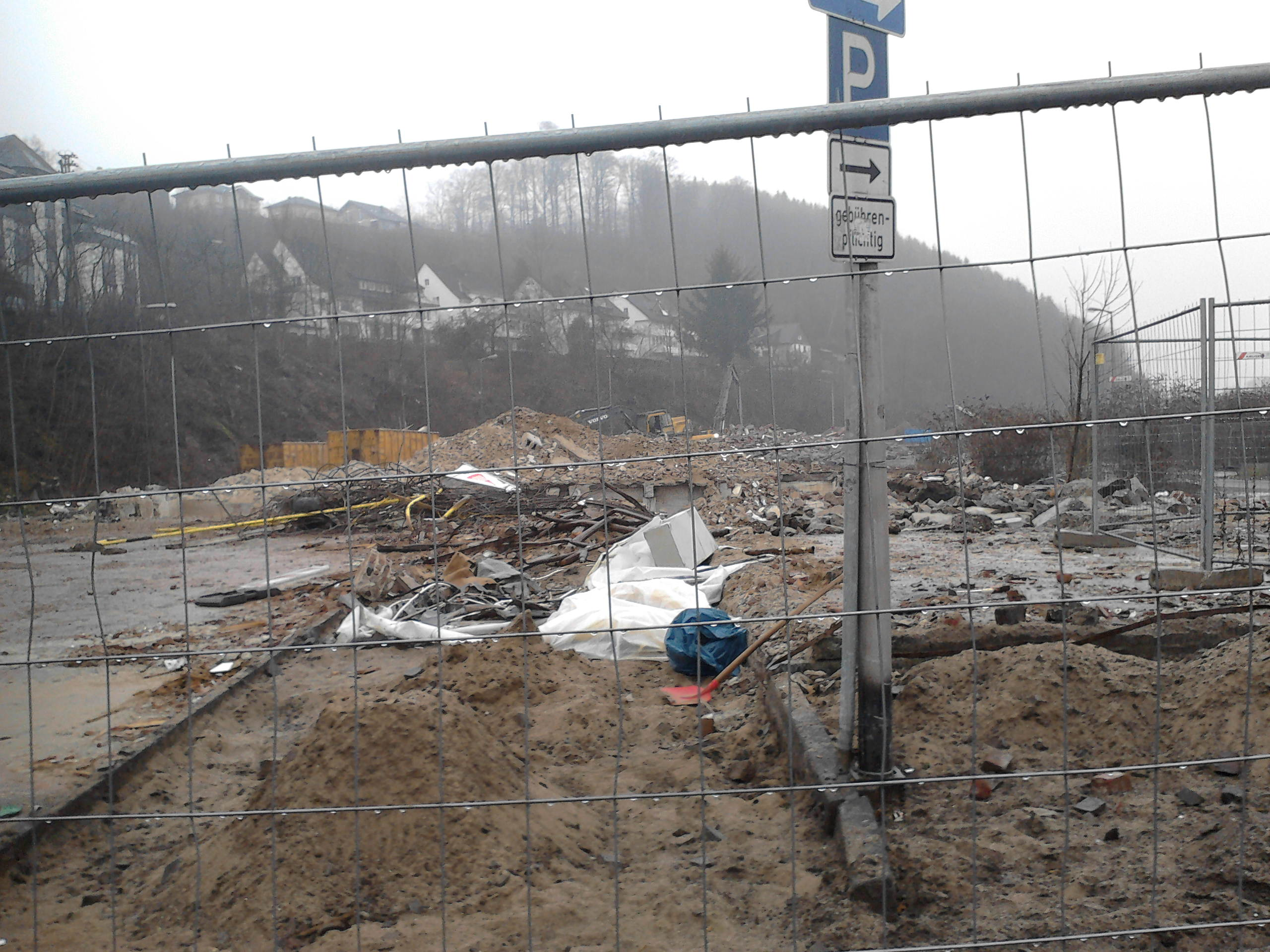
After the demolition of the entrance building

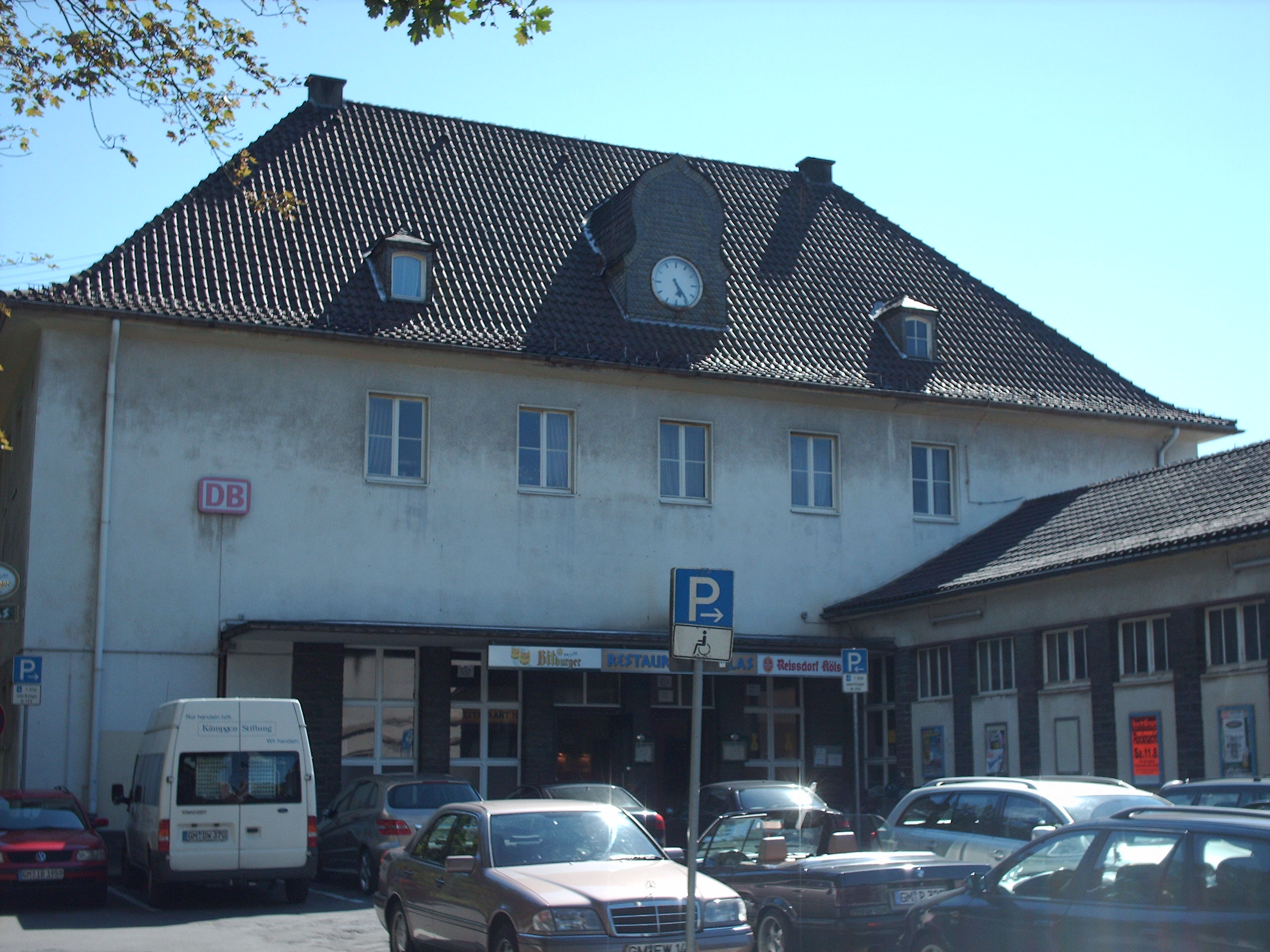
The entrance building demolished in 2012

The first station called Gummersbach was in Niedersessmar. In 1893, with the opening of the Hagen–Dieringhausen railway (Volme Valley Railway) from Dieringhausen to Brügge, it was renamed Niedersessmar. Since then Gummersbach station has served the town centre.

The entrance building in Gummersbach, which was demolished in 2012, was first built in 1937 when the old building was too small.

=== Former lines ===
The following routes formerly stopped at the station:

- the Wiehl Valley Railway (until 1965), which connected to the Wisser Valley Railway (until 1960) to Waldbröl and Morsbach. Due to severe war damage beyond repair the track section between Volperhausen and Wissen was shut down in March 1945 despite strong local protest. Today, the remaining section Hermesdorf–Morsbach is part of the Wiehl Valley Railway and awaits its resurrection.
- the Volme Valley Railway train from Brügge and Lüdenscheid, continuing to Hagen and Wuppertal (until 1986/87)
- the Wipper Valley Railway to Wipperfürth, Hückeswagen and Remscheid-Lennep (until 1985/86)
- the Siegburg–Olpe railway and Cologne–Overath railway to Siegburg (until 1954/56), Cologne (to date), Olpe (until 1979).

Not all trains ran over the whole routes shown above and some services only lasted a few years. For example:

- Most trains to Olpe ran from Dieringhausen.
- After the construction of the tunnel at Hoffnungsthal in 1910, the line between Overath and Siegburg was served only be regional services and no direct trains ran to Gummersbach.
- Direct connections to Morsbach usually ran only from Waldbröl and Hermesdorf.

== Current situation ==
Before the reconstruction, the station consisted of just a through track and a dead-end track ending in a buffer stop. The latter was reconnected to the through track on both sides as part of the reactivation of the Volme Valley Railway between Marienheide and Meinerzhagen and the associated duplication of the line between Dieringhausen and Gummersbach. There are actually two tracks towards Dieringhausen, but one track was closed years ago and is currently separated and overgrown. New signals were also built several years ago in the middle of the second track in some places. All other tracks, including a comprehensive network of freight tracks, and facilities were demolished a few years ago, as was the former railway siding of the defunct company L. & C. Steinmüller. The site of the former railway land has been converted into a large, stretched parking area. Deutsche Bahn has not operated freight transport in the Oberbergische district since 1997, except for freight traffic on the Wiehl Valley Railway, which was re-established in 1999.

The two signal boxes in the station area are no longer used operationally. One of the two signal boxes is used by the local savings bank for training, while the other is unused at the exit to Dieringhausen. A road underpass was built near the station in 2009, which will connect the town centre with the Steinmueller area. Near the station there is a new campus of the Gummersbach branch of the Cologne University of Applied Sciences, which can be reached via a metal footbridge. The station building was demolished in January 2012. Following the reopening of the line to Meinerzhagen, the entire Gummersbach station was rebuilt. The new platform is completely covered and trains run on both sides of it. An underpass allows direct access to the local campus of the Cologne University of Applied Sciences. The new station is completely barrier-free.

The station is served by the following service:

Line	Route	Frequency	Rollingstock
RB 25	Cologne – Rösrath – Overath – Engelskirchen – Dieringhausen – Gummersbach (– Marienheide – Meinerzhagen – Lüdenscheid)	30 minutes (hourly: Gummersbach–Lüdenscheid)	Alstom Coradia LINT 54 and 81

Directly opposite the campus, a paid car park was completed in 2012. In addition, a shopping center located opposite the platform opened in 2015.
