= Spich station =

Railway station in Germany

Spich
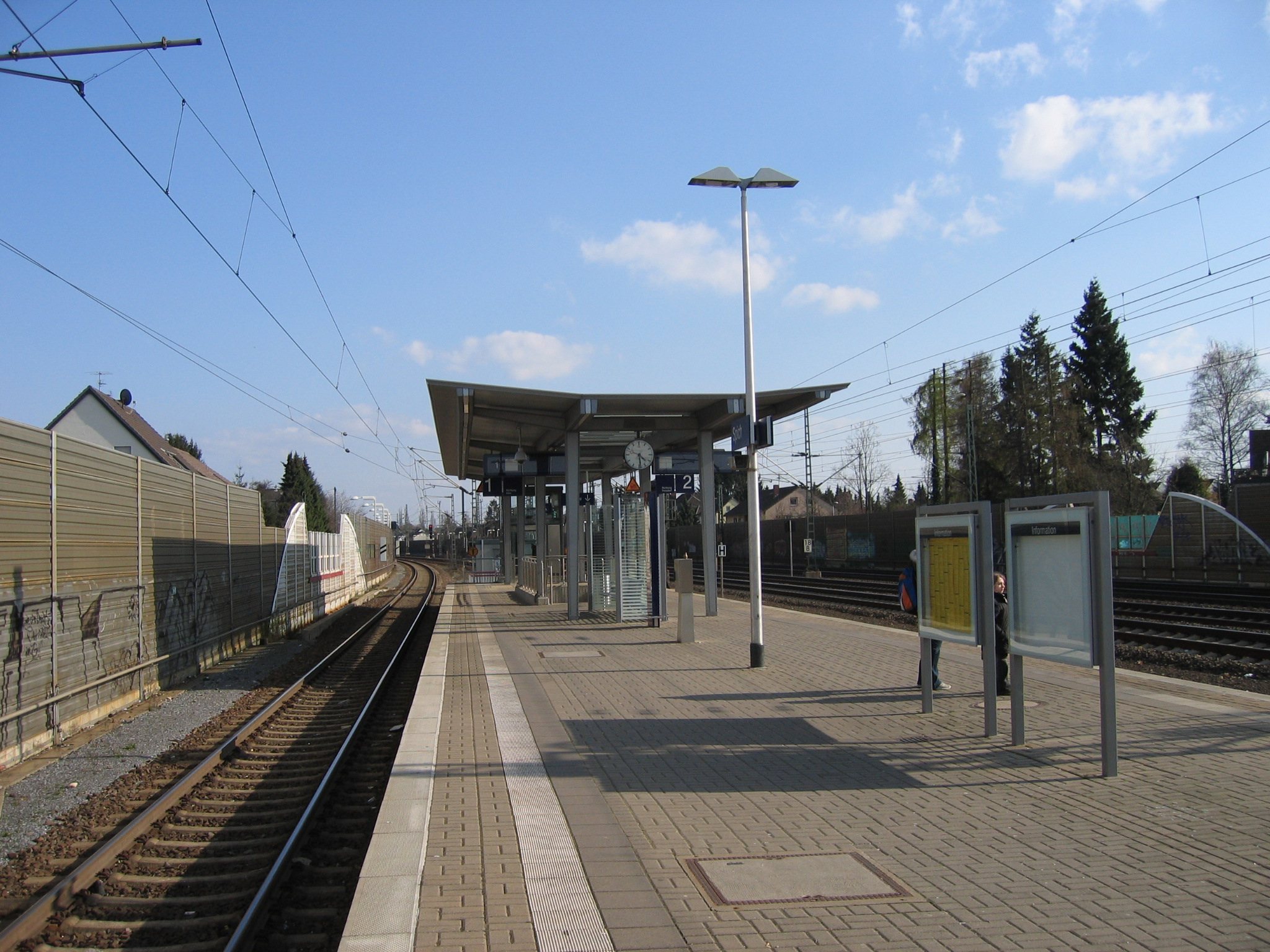

General information
- Location: Niederkasseler Str., Spich, NRW; Germany
- Coordinates: 50°49′32″N 7°06′57″E
- Lines: East Rhine Railway (KBS 465); Sieg Railway (KBS 460)
- Platforms: 2

Construction
- Accessible: Yes

Other information
- Station code: 5924
- DS100 code: KSPI
- IBNR: 8000311
- Category: 4
- Fare zone: VRS: 2545
- Website: www.bahnhof.de

History
- Opened: 1905/14

Services
Preceding station	Cologne S-Bahn	Following station
Porz-Wahn towards Horrem	S12	Troisdorf towards Au (Sieg)
Porz-Wahn towards Düren	S19	Troisdorf towards Au (Sieg)
Location
- Location within North Rhine-Westphalia

Spich station is a railway junction in the district of Spich of the town of Troisdorf in the German state of North Rhine-Westphalia, on the Sieg Railway. It is served by line S12 of the Cologne S-Bahn. This operates between Troisdorf, Hennef (Sieg) or Au (Sieg) and Köln-Ehrenfeld or Horrem at 20-minute intervals. It is also served by the S19 service between Düren and Hennef or Au, at 20-minute intervals. These two services provide a service every 10 minutes between Troisdorf and Cologne. It is classified by Deutsche Bahn as a category 4 station.

The Cologne–Frankfurt high-speed line also passes through Spich, but without stopping.
