= Gummersbach-Dieringhausen station =

Railway station in Gummersbach, Germany

Dieringhausen
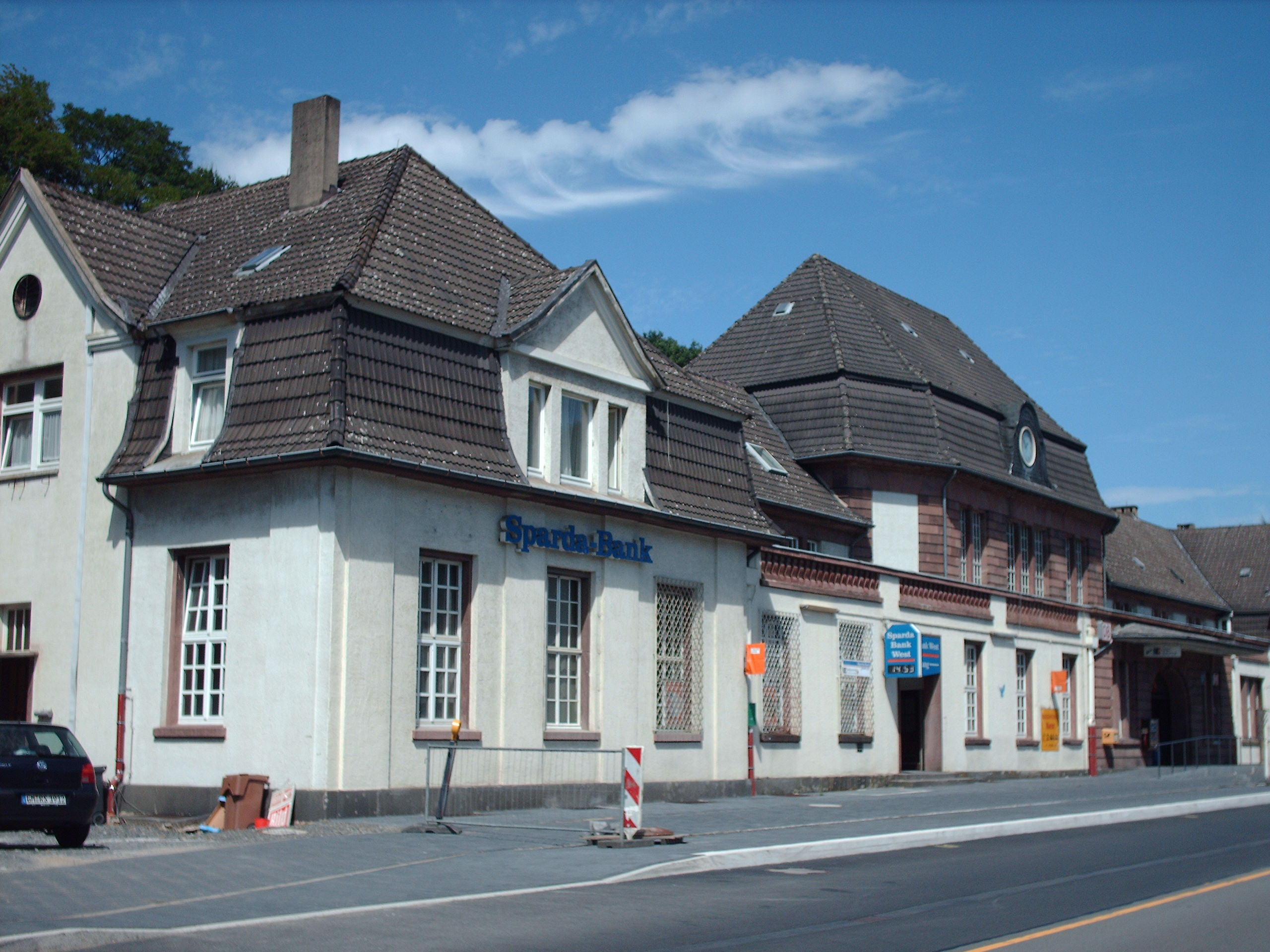

General information
- Location: Dieringhauserstr. 2, Gummersbach, NRW; Germany
- Coordinates: 50°59′07″N 7°32′33″E
- Owner: Deutsche Bahn
- Operator: DB Netz; DB Station&Service
- Lines: Siegburg–Olpe railway; Hagen–Dieringhausen railway
- Platforms: 2

Construction
- Accessible: Yes

Other information
- Station code: 1202
- DS100 code: KDI
- IBNR: 8000363
- Category: 6
- Fare zone: VRS: 2480
- Website: www.bahnhof.de

History
- Opened: 1 May 1887

Services
Preceding station	DB Regio NRW	Following station
Ründeroth towards Köln Hansaring	RB 25	Gummersbach towards Lüdenscheid
Location

Gummersbach-Dieringhausen station has existed since 1887 and it made the formerly insignificant village of Dieringhausen (now a suburb of Gummersbach) an important regional town in the German state of North Rhine-Westphalia. Its former railway lines, railway depot and railway settlements still dot the village.

For a long time Dieringhausen station was an important railway junction in the Oberbergisches railway network and it was the most important station in the district town of Gummersbach, although it was not located in its centre.

The station is heritage-listed. Both the entrance building and the former depot have been listed since 1989.

Even today the station is operationally the most important station on the Siegburg–Olpe railway, since trains are refuelled in the station and it serves as storage sidings at night.

== History ==
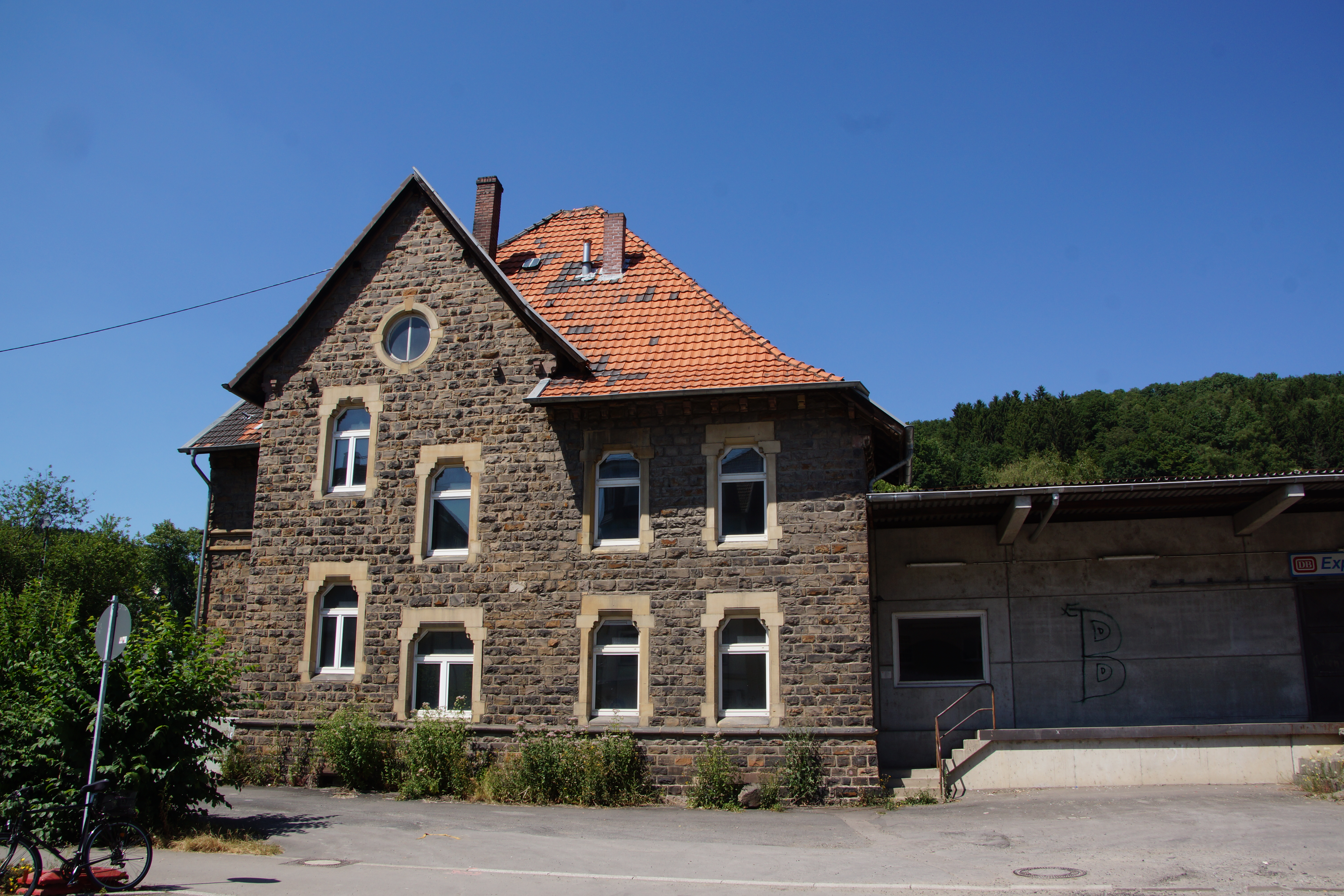
The first Dieringhausen station with freight clearance shed

The first station was built parallel to the county road in 1887 and was later used as a freight yard; it was located on the site of the former railway workshop. In 1902, the water tower was replaced by a new structure. In 1905/1906, the new roundhouse was built with eleven roads. A settlement for railway workers and their families was built during the development of the station.

From 1913, the railways were relaid with 14 platform tracks at a higher level. Only the old station and only the first two roads of the roundhouse formed part of the 1916 railway workshop. The current station was put into operation in 1921.

Over time, the railway workshop came to serve Osberghausen station and Dieringhausen station acted as a train marshalling station for the Wiehltalbahn.

Deutsche Bundesbahn closed the workshop in 1982. It has been occupied by the Dieringhausen Railway Museum (Eisenbahnmuseum Dieringhausen) since 1985.

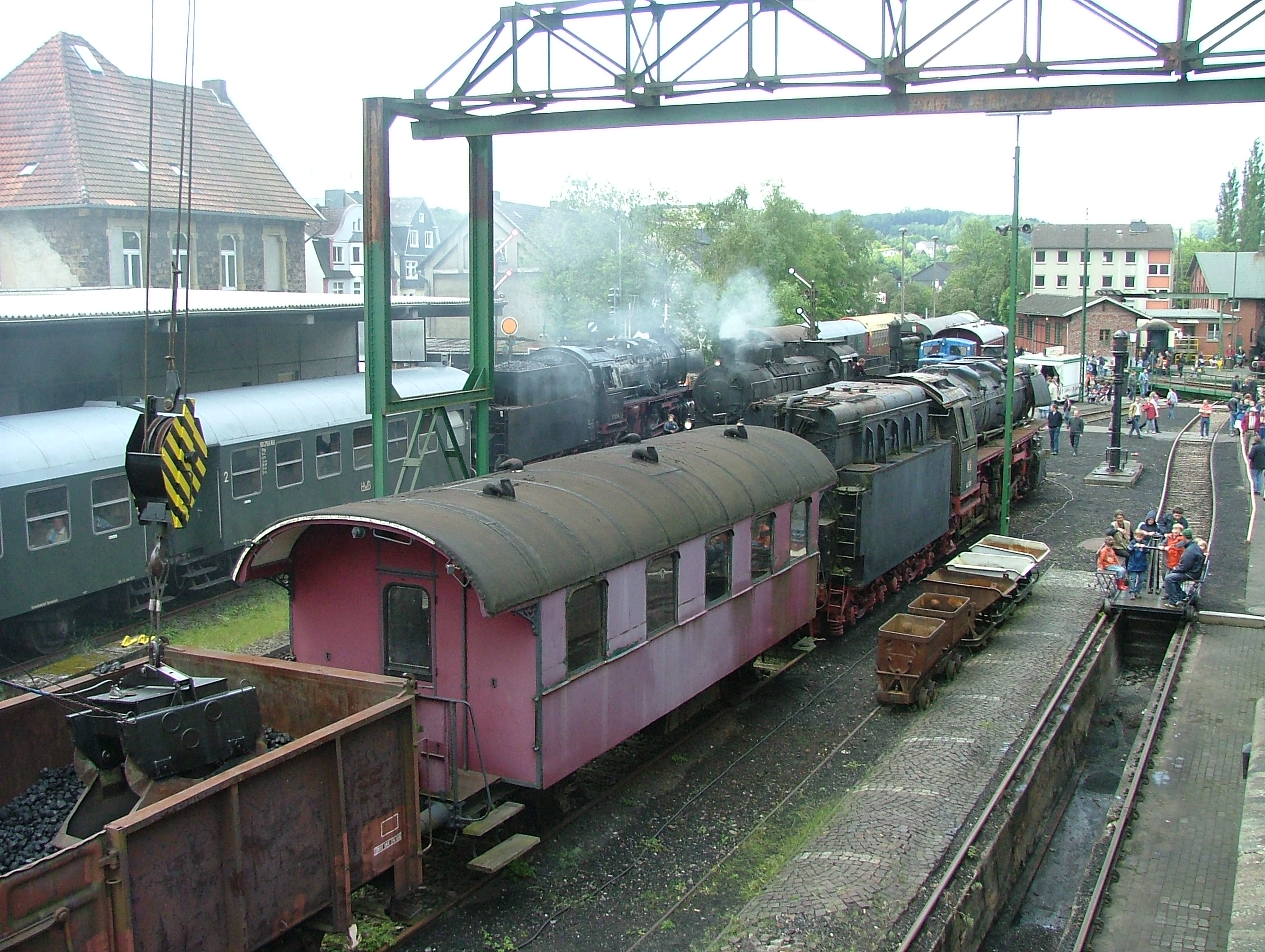
The former workshop and curnent Dieringhausen Railway Museum

== The new station building ==
The large entrance building of the current station was built in the style of Köln Messe/Deutz station. Dieringhausen station is heritage-listed as having regional significance. This listing referred to a 2001 study which evaluated the entire site as worthy of heritage-listing.

== Current condition ==
Extensive trackage still exist near the station building, demonstrating the former regional importance of this station. The ticket office in the station building and the kiosk has been closed for several years and the building now houses a bank and a Chinese restaurant.

Previously, there were two platforms. The entrance to platform 1 has still not been made accessible for the disabled. The entrance to the now quite dilapidated and trackless platform 2 is bricked-up. The roof of the former building on platform 2 has collapsed. The baggage lifts have long been decommissioned.

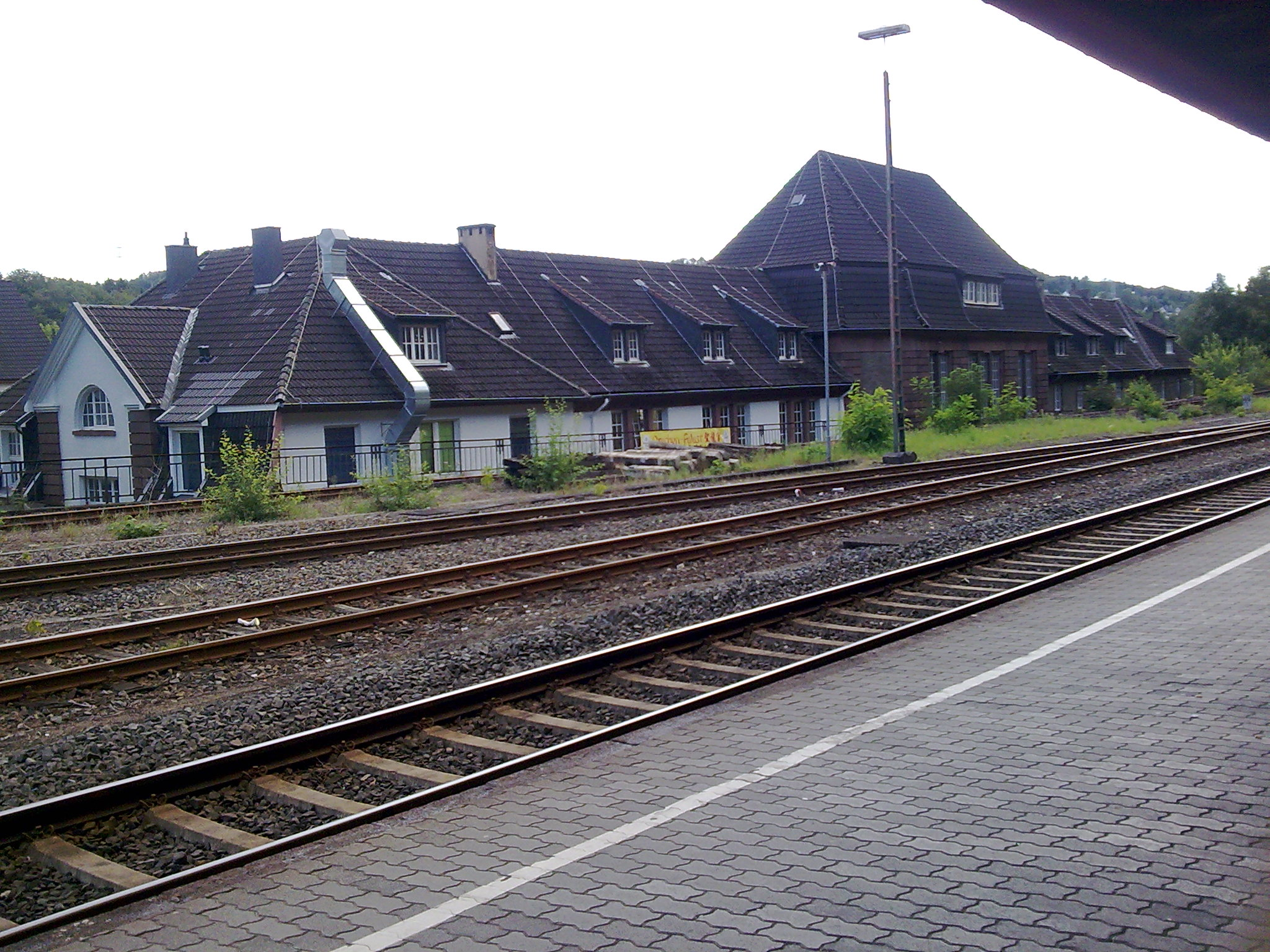
The entrance building from the platform

Today Gummersbach-Dieringhausen station, which belongs to the Cologne diesel network, is served by Regionalbahn service RB 25 (Oberbergische Bahn) with Alstom Coradia LINT 81 railcars stopping at the remaining two platform tracks and by the museum trains of the Wiehl Valley Railway (platform track 2). RB 25 services cross in Gummersbach-Dieringhausen. The other tracks are partially used for the stabling of Talent railcars (in the eastern area of the station, including the refuelling track) and the rolling stock of the railway museum (the western part). The other tracks are no longer used and are overgrown and partially dismantled.

The former freight unloading tracks at the first station (now used by the railway museum) have not been used since 1997, but the loading tracks are still available. The former truck parking area for freight clearance is now used as a car park.

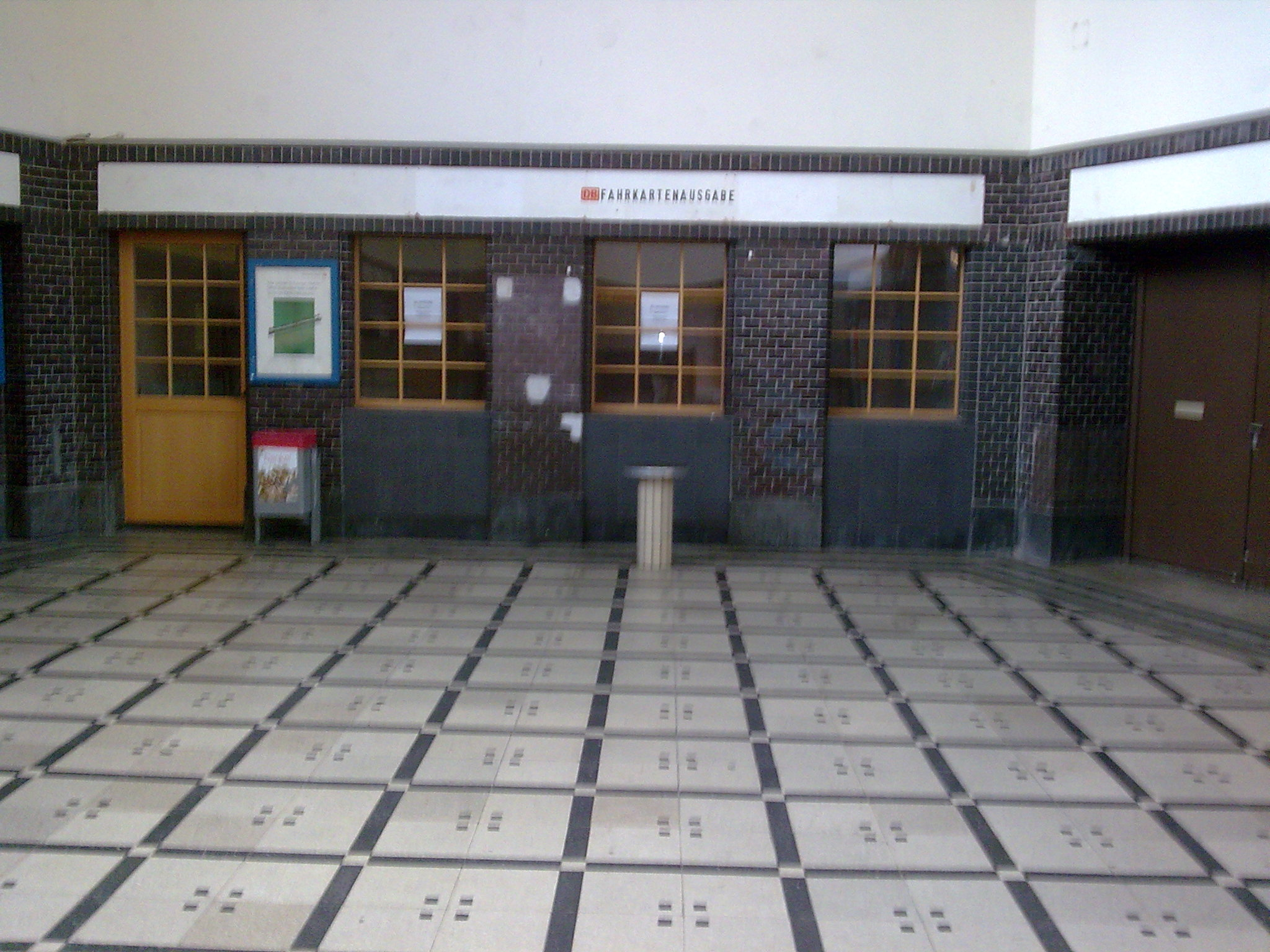
Former ticket office

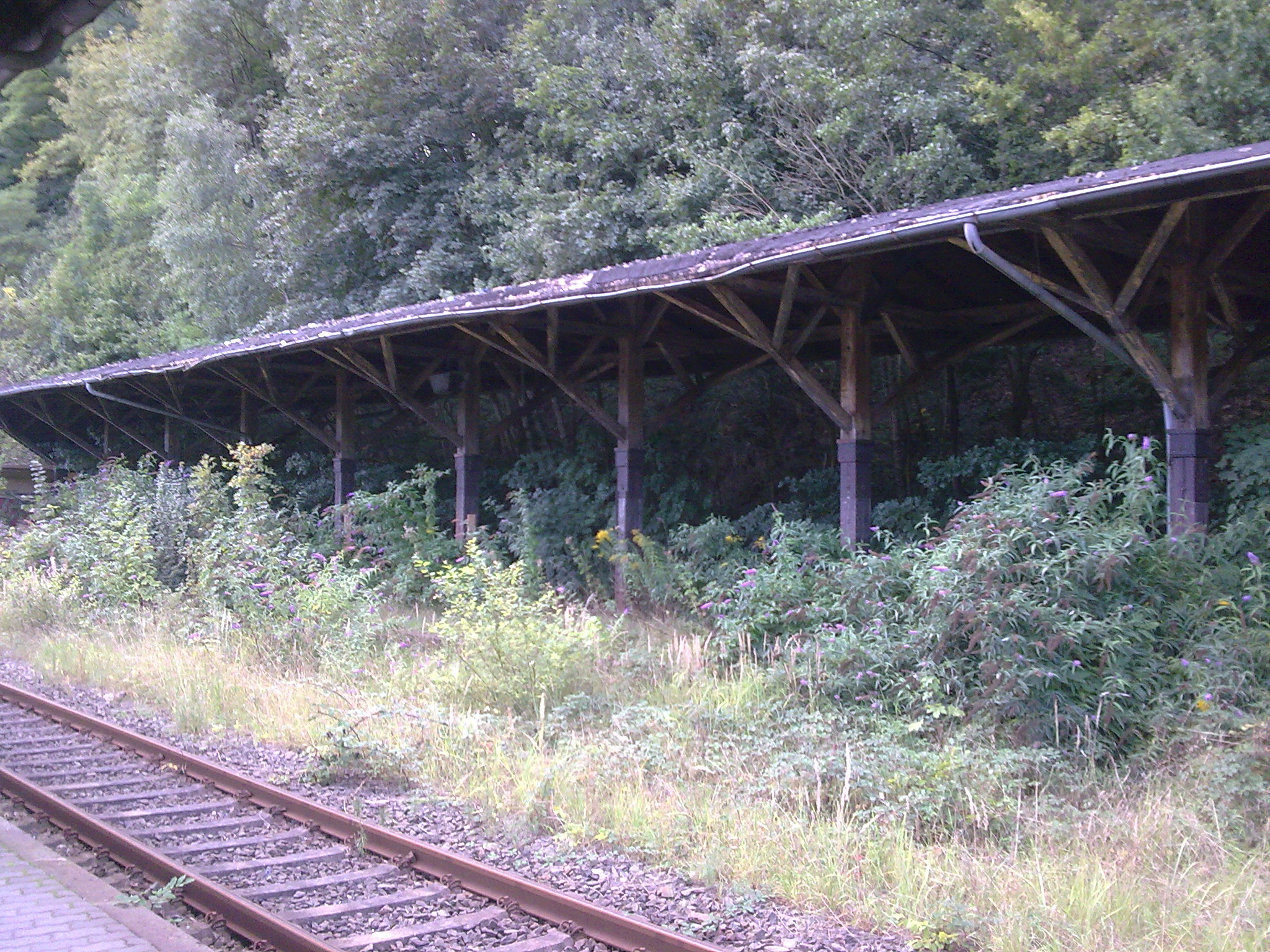
Abandoned platform 2

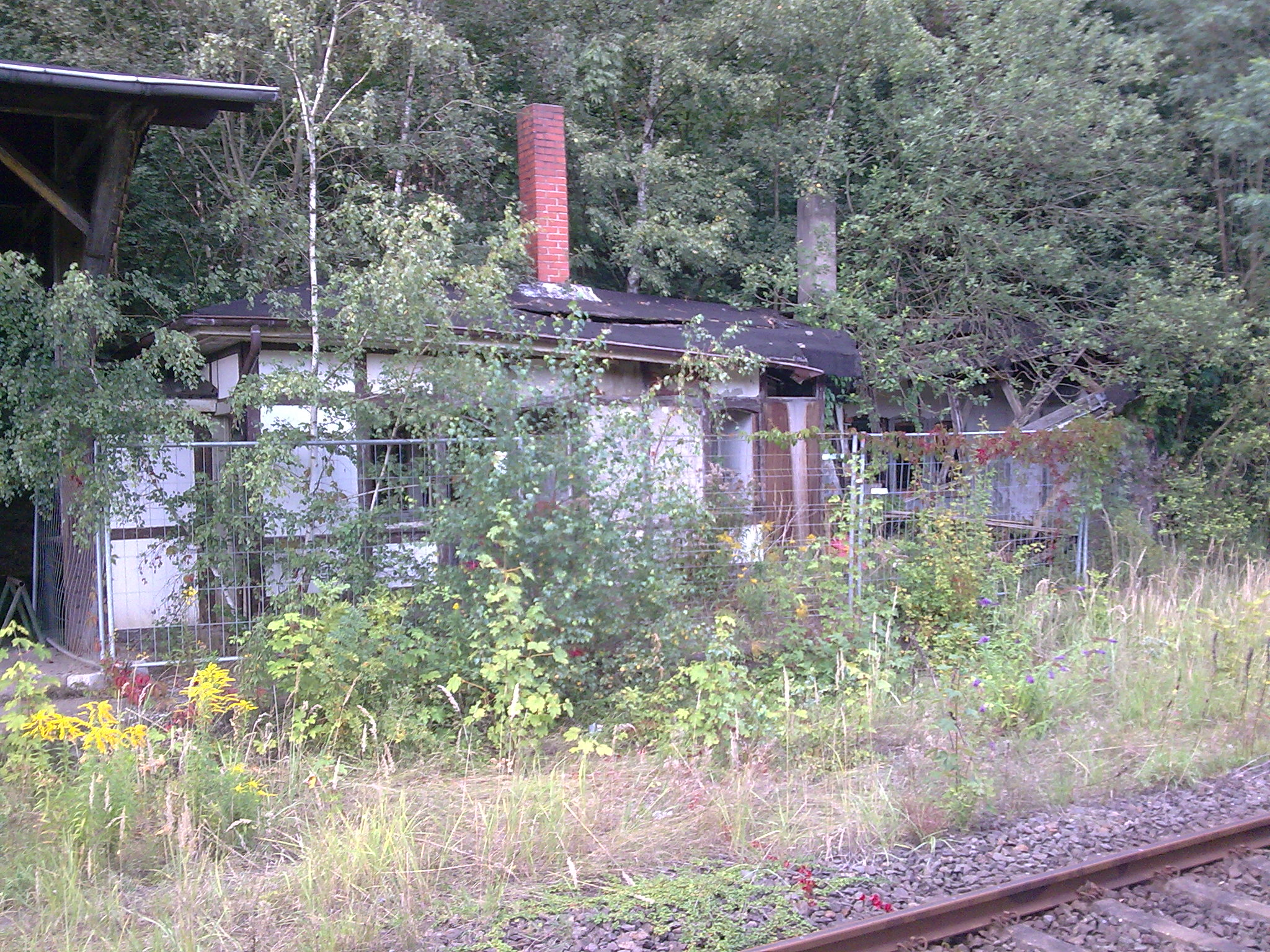
Collaspsed platform building, former platform 2

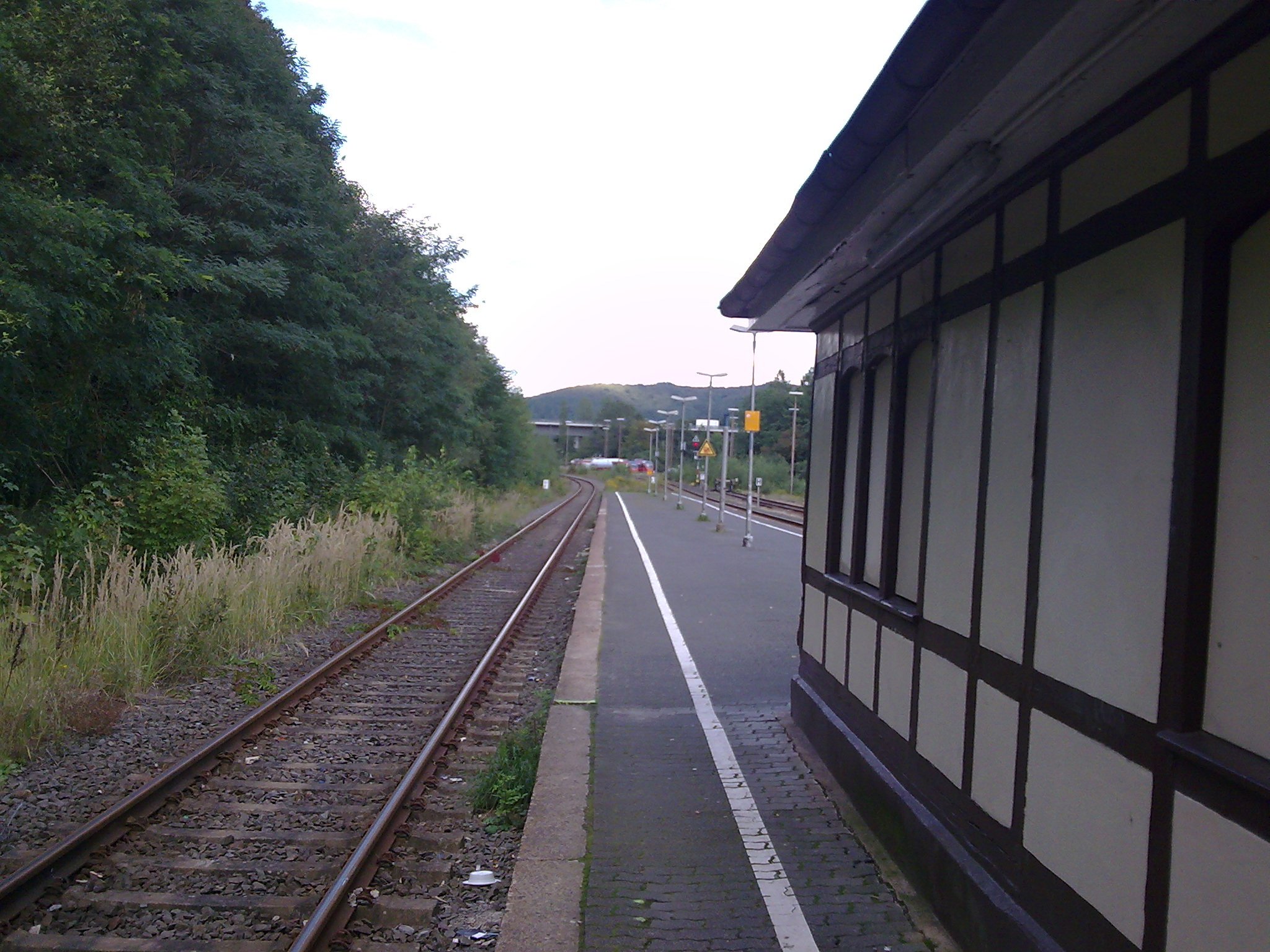
Looking east, in the background is the refuelling point and the Talent sidings

== Rail services ==
The station is served by the following services:

Line	Route	Frequency	Rollingstock
RB 25	Cologne - Rösrath - Overath - Engelskirchen - Gummersbach-Dieringhausen - Gummersbach - Marienheide – Meinerzhagen – Lüdenscheid	Köln - Gummersbach every 30 minutes, Gummersbach - Lüdenscheid every 60 minutes	LINT 81
Wiehltalbahn	Bergischer Löwe Dieringhausen - Wiehl - Waldbröl (museum railway)	Individual services	Steam locomotive "Waldbröl"
