= Cologne Airport loop =

Railway line in North Rhine-Westphalia, Germany

Overview
- Native name: Flughafenschleife Köln
- Line number: 450.13 (S-Bahn); 465 (East Rhine Railway); 472 (High-speed line)
- Locale: North Rhine-Westphalia, Germany

Service
- Route number: 2691 (2692/3/4)

Technical
- Line length: 15.2 km (9.4 mi)
- Operating speed: 130km/h (max)

The Cologne Airport Loop is a 15.2-kilometre-long (9.4 mi) railway line, which connects the Cologne/Bonn Airport station to the Cologne–Frankfurt high-speed rail line. The loop is used by Intercity-Express trains, the Rhein-Erft-Bahn (RB 27) and S-Bahn line 13.

== Route ==
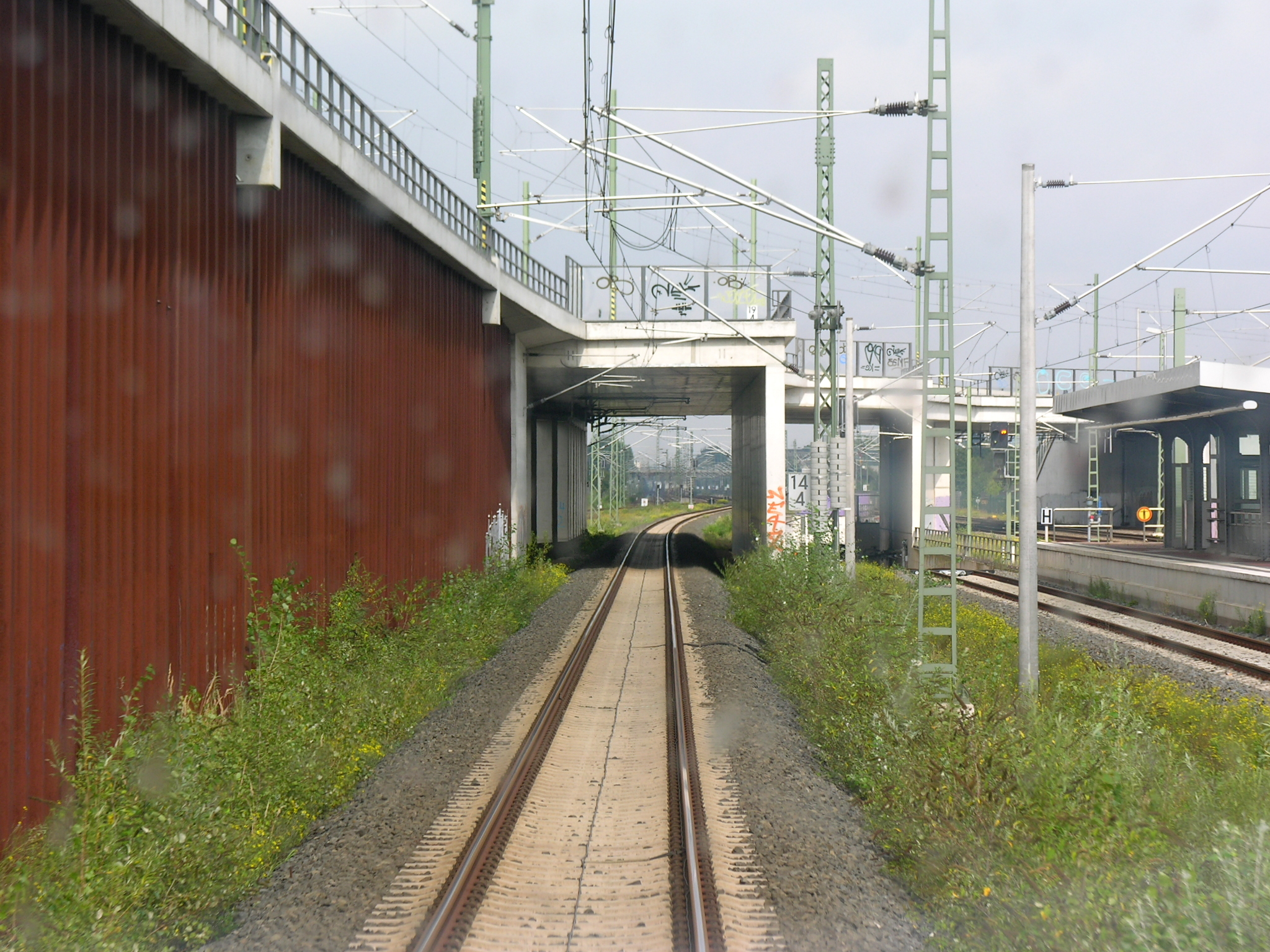
View from ICE train to Cologne on high-speed line about to pass under the southern end of the loop line

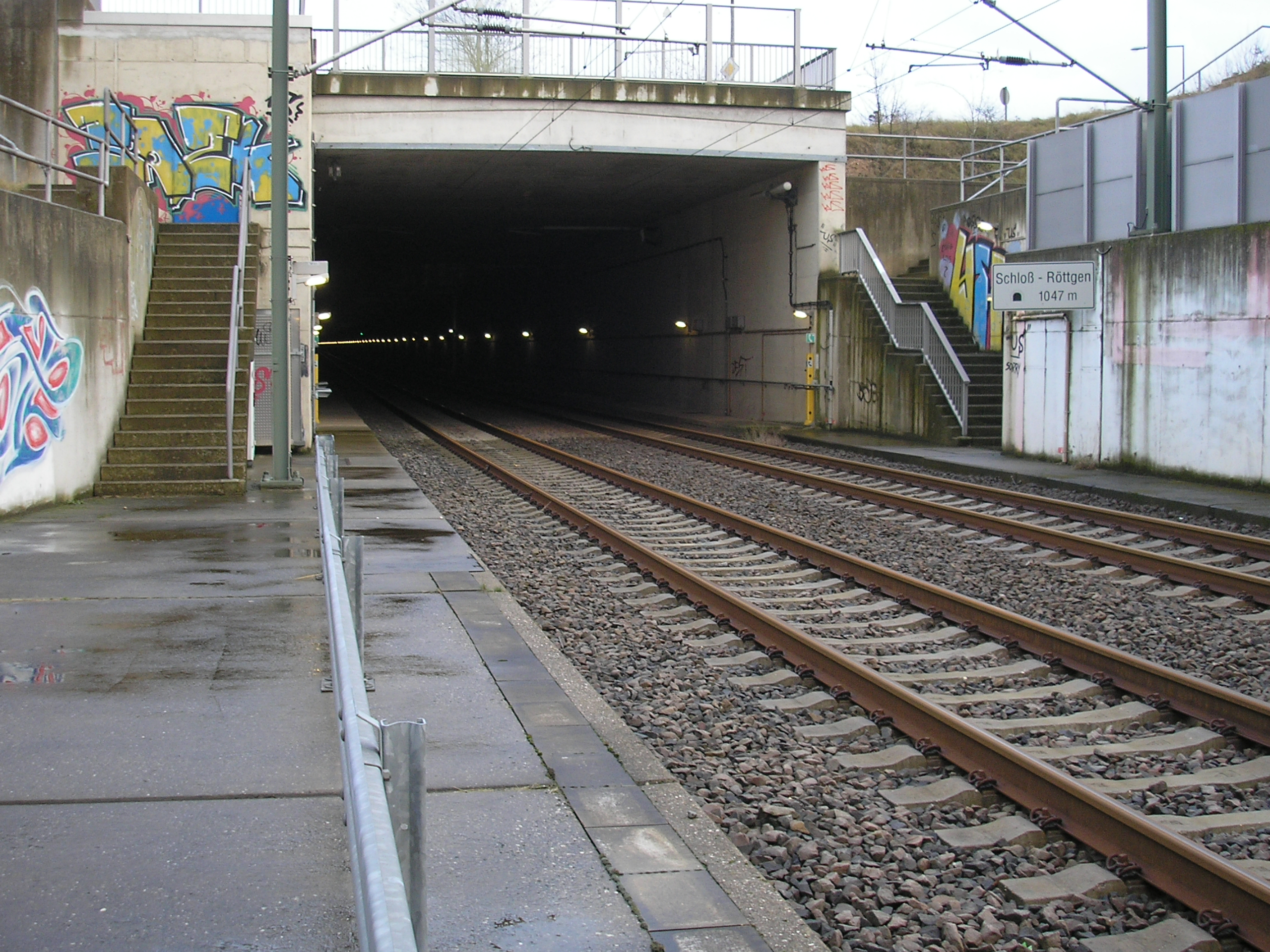
North portal of the Schloss-Röttgen Tunnel

The double track line branches off the high-speed rail line north-west of the Cologne district of Gremberghoven and crosses the B8 highway (Frankfurter Straße). After the A59 autobahn underpass it swings towards the southeast and crosses farmland in a cutting. The newly established Frankfurter Strasse station connects the industrial zone of Gremberghoven and the Airport Business Park to public transport. The station is served by the S-Bahn and the S-Bahn-like Oberbergische line RB 25 regional service on the Köln-Kalk–Overath railway.

After passing through the 1,047-metre (1,145 yd) Schloss-Röttgen tunnel, the line turns to run parallel and to the north of the A59 in a northeasterly direction to the Airport interchange and the Porz-Grengel motorway junction. It then enters into the 4.210-kilometre (2.616 mi) Airport Tunnel. It passes the Wahner Heide nature reserve and through the airport, the airport station and back under the A59 completely underground. The route then returns to the surface and passes between Eisdorf and Wahn on a ridge. After a 400-metre (440 yd) long embankment, the line connects with the new line.

The line runs for 15.19 kilometres (9.44 mi), with 2.50 kilometres (1.55 mi) of the line at ground level, 5.01 kilometres (3.11 mi) in cuttings, 1.01 kilometres (0.63 mi) on embankments, 5.26 kilometres (3.27 mi) in tunnel, and 1.41 kilometres (0.88 mi) on bridges and ramps.

== History ==
The connection of the airport loop railway was approved by the Federal Government on 20 December 1989 as part of the decision to build the Cologne–Frankfurt high-speed rail line on its current alignment. The construction of the Airport Link began on 4 December 2000 at Porz-Wahn station and was handed over to its operator on 12 June 2004.

== Operating ==
While the airport loop was planned and built as part of the Cologne-Frankfurt high-speed line, few trains run along both lines. The main mode of transport on the airport loop is S-Bahn line S13 between Cologne and Troisdorf with 58 pairs of trains on weekdays. The connection to the south is served very poorly. The Regional-Express line RE 8 operates over the airport loop every hour. However, the first train from the south reaches the airport after 7 AM and on Sundays, after 10 AM. Getting to the airport earlier than this from Bonn and Koblenz is only possible on significantly slower indirect services.

Formerly, most of the hourly Intercity-Express services between Cologne and Berlin started or stopped at the airport station. This created operational problems, as the airport station was planned as a through station only and no turning facilities were built. Since the station has limited facilities, the terminating ICE trains took up platform space properly reserved for S-Bahn trains. As a result, two-thirds of the S-Bahn trains operating towards Cologne must use the outer platform, with the low platforms designed in Germany for long-distance trains, 20 centimetres lower than appropriate for S-Bahn trains, thus creating a step between the platform and the carriage floor.
