= Porz-Wahn station =

Railway station in Cologne, Germany

Porz Wahn
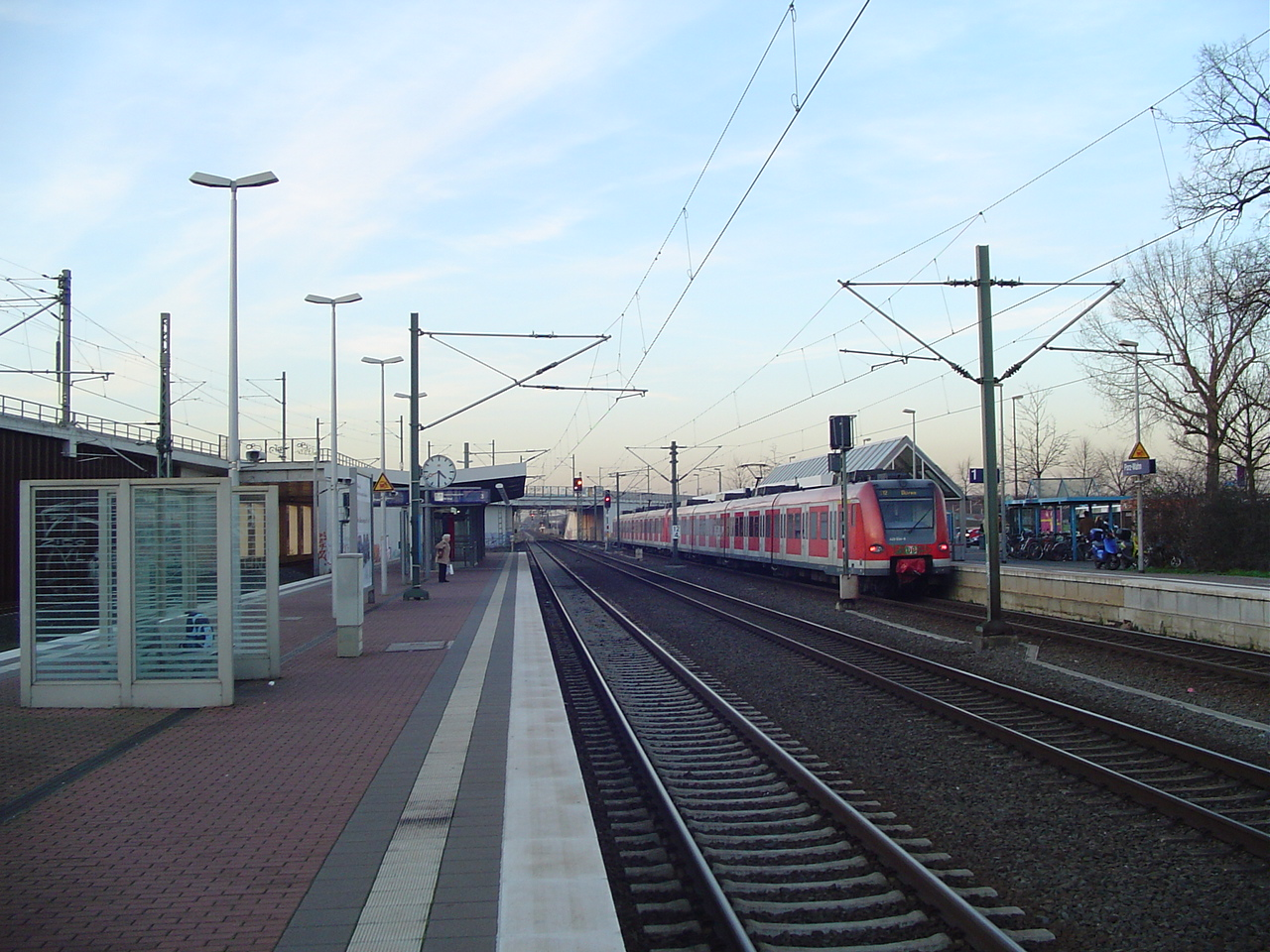
- Station building

General information
- Location: Am Bahnhof 1, Porz-Wahn, Cologne, NRW; Germany
- Coordinates: 50°51′29″N 7°04′45″E
- Owner: Deutsche Bahn
- Operator: DB Netz; DB Station&Service
- Line: Sieg Railway
- Platforms: 3
- Connections: 117 160 162 163 167 505

Construction
- Accessible: Yes

Other information
- Station code: 5002
- DS100 code: KPW
- IBNR: 8004873
- Category: 4
- Fare zone: VRS: 2100
- Website: www.bahnhof.de

History
- Opened: 1859

Services
Preceding station	Cologne S-Bahn	Following station
Porz (Rhein) towards Horrem	S12	Spich towards Au (Sieg)
Cologne/Bonn Airport towards Düren	S19	Spich towards Au (Sieg)
Location

Porz-Wahn is a railway station situated at Porz, Cologne in the German state of North Rhine-Westphalia on the Sieg and East Rhine Railways. It is served by line S12 of the Cologne S-Bahn. This operates between Troisdorf, Hennef (Sieg) or Au (Sieg) and Köln-Ehrenfeld or Horrem at 20-minute intervals. It is also served by the S19 service between Düren and Hennef or Au, at 20-minute intervals. These two services provide a service every 10 minutes between Troisdorf and Cologne. It is classified by Deutsche Bahn as a category 4 station.
