= Siegburg–Olpe railway =

Siegburg/Bonn–Olpe
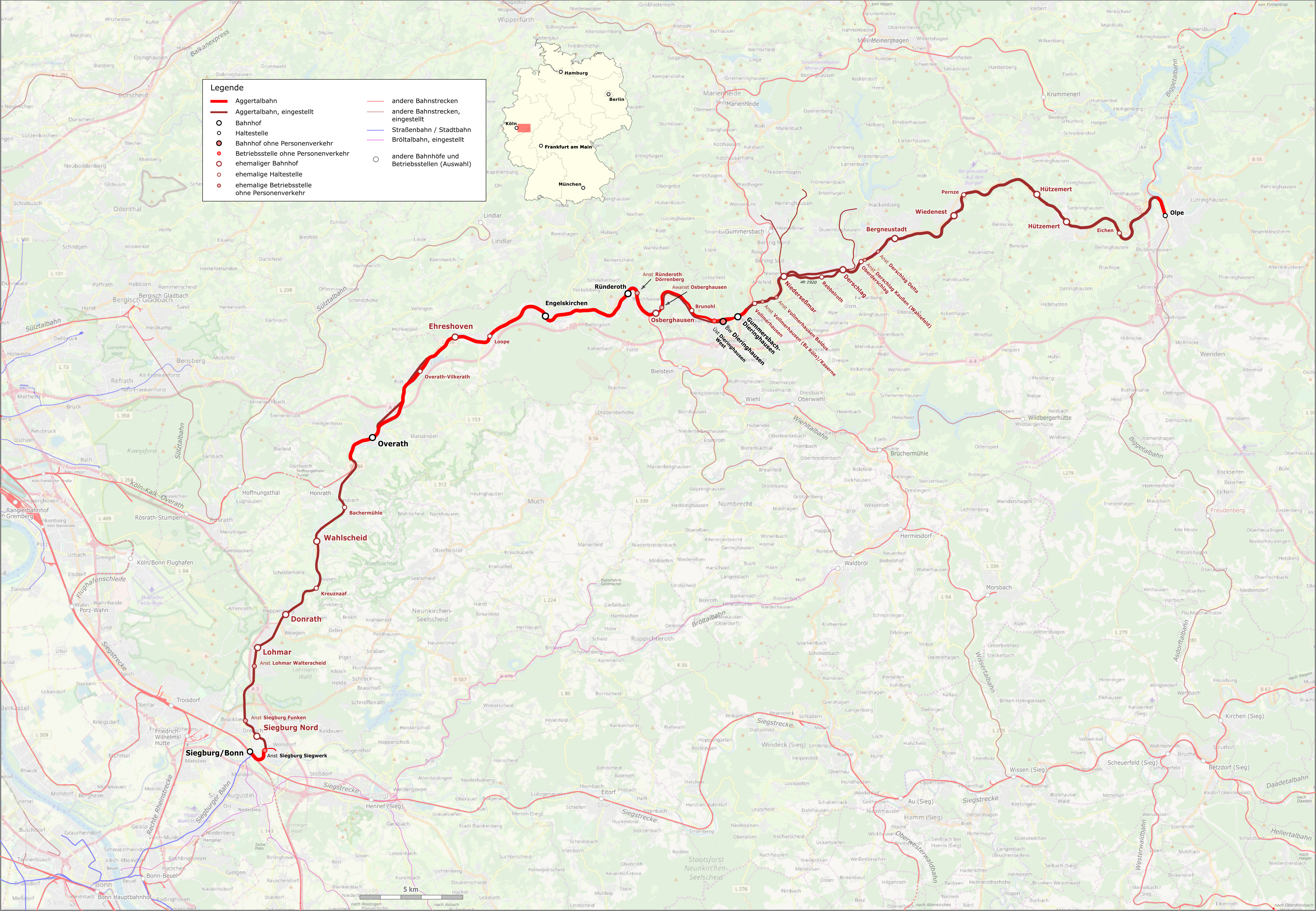
- Route in yellow

Overview
- Line number: 2657
- Locale: North Rhine-Westphalia, Germany

Service
- Route number: 459

Technical
- Line length: 73.6 km (45.7 mi)
- Track gauge: 1,435 mm (4 ft 8 1/2 in) standard gauge
- Operating speed: 70 km/h (43.5 mph) (maximum)

The Siegburg–Olpe railway or Agger Valley Railway (German: Bahnstrecke Siegburg–Olpe or Aggertalbahn) is a single-tracked, non-electrified branch line in the German state of North Rhine-Westphalia. Part of a direct link from Cologne, only the section from Overath to Gummersbach-Dieringhausen is still in operation. The section of line from Siegburg to Overath and from Dieringhausen to Olpe are closed.

The line is named after the River Agger, which it follows for a long way and crosses several times.

== Significance ==
Although the line as always been considered by its operator as a branch line, it is central to the railway network of the Oberbergisches Land and it has been called a "secret" main line. Like the other lines in the region it primarily served local industry (mainly the textile and metal industries). Unlike, for example, the Wiehl Valley Railway (Wiehltalbahn), the line was not primary built to serve the quarry industry, it also used to connect to company sidings and to other branch lines. Passenger played only a secondary role from the beginning.

Despite the fears of critics, the line was initially very profitable: the line from Siegburg to Derschlag was the most profitable branch line between Cologne and Kassel. This section was opened in 1896 while its continuation to Bergneustadt was still being planned. Accounts from 1892/1893 show that it had revenues of 21,000 marks per kilometre. For comparison, the Wisser Valley Railway (Wissertalbahn) between Wissen and Morsbach generated only 6,800 marks per km.

The following standard gauge branch lines branched from the Agger Valley Railway:

- the Cologne–Overath railway as a direct connection from the Oberbergisch district to Cologne
- the Wiehl Valley Railway to Osberghausen
- the Volme Valley Railway (Volmetalbahn) to Dieringhausen
- the tramlines and freight sidings of the Gummersbach Light Railway (Gummersbacher Kleinbahnen) to Niedersessmar and Derschlag
- the Finnentrop–Freudenberg railway to Olpe.

Up to the 1950s, there was also in Engelskirchen a loading bay of the metre-gauge Leppe Valley Railway (Leppetalbahn) to Marienheide and a very small narrow-gauge railway to Drolshagen.

In addition, during the two world wars and the occupation of the Ruhr, the line together with the Wiehl Valley Railway was historically significant as a diversion route for coal trains and other important traffic. In the 1970s it was used as a scenic railway.

Until the 1970s there were many sidings serving industrial companies such as Delta in Derschlag and Dörrenberg Edelstahl in Ründeroth.

The traffic on the now closed Siegburg–Overath section usually had only local significance. Following the opening of the Cologne–Overath railway, trains ran from Cologne to Dieringhausen or even Hagen. The timetable only included a service over the whole of the original line from Siegburg to Olpe until the Second World War.

There were also mostly only local passenger trains on the section between Dieringhausen and Olpe. There were few express trains in the timetable which ran to points outside the area. This was also one of the reasons for the closure of passenger services, partly caused by poor design, including the lack of a direct connection from Olpe to Gummersbach except via an awkward set of points in the Dieringhausen district.

== History ==
=== Planning and construction ===
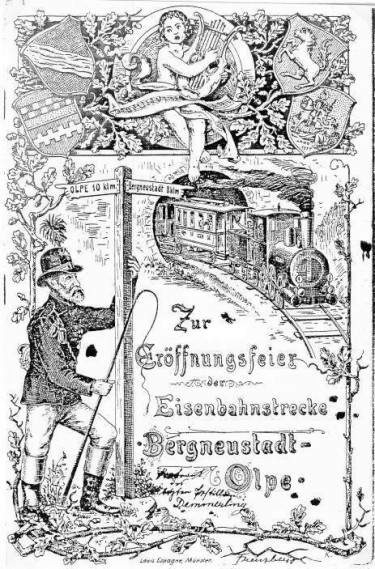
Title page of the Festschrift for the opening ceremony of the Bergneustadt – Olpe section

The first documented written discussions on a railway through the Oberbergische district date back to 1861. At that time, manufacturers founded a committee that planned a railway connection between Cologne and Kassel. This was originally intended to be a main line. This project did not materialise because the Bergisch-Märkische Railway Company (Bergisch-Märkische Eisenbahn-Gesellschaft) preferred a more northerly lines via Hagen and because of the problem of financing it—a main line would have cost 30 million gold marks. For comparison, the section from Bergneustadt to Olpe was priced at 3,367,000 marks in its building permit.

The planners of the Siegburg–Olpe railway preferred a direct connection to Cologne from the beginning rather than the indirect route via Siegburg. But at this time, there was still a military base in Cologne, which was in the way of the line. Another early plan proposed a line through the Agger valley from Siegburg to the Ruhr as part of the East Rhine Railway. This plan was rejected after the intervention of Cologne industrialists.

The Agger Valley Railway was the first major railway line inside the district of Oberbergischer Kreis. Before its construction, some critics claimed that its operations would not be profitable, so it was only agreed after long discussions and after the exertion of political pressure. The critics came mainly from the Cologne area because of its connection to Siegburg, as well as from the staff of the Bergisch-Märkische Railway Company, which favoured a route to the north. The political pressure included the Prussian minister for railway at the time, Albert von Maybach, the most influential person in the region in relation to railway construction after Hermann von Budde.

The first railway connections in the region occurred in Brügge (in the municipality of Lüdenscheid) in, 1874, in Olpe in 1875 and in Wipperfürth in 1877. The connections there were too far from the Oberbergischer Kreis for passengers and profitable freight operations.

For cost reasons, the railway was built as a branch line. In most places it was built right next to the road, straight through the villages. This would still be a problem at the beginning of the 20th century. Further evidence of cost savings are the stations of Ründeroth and Derschlag. Their entrance building were previously at Recklinghausen and Recklinghausen Süd. Since they were no longer large enough, they were dismantled and re-erected on the Agger Valley Railway. In the case of the Derschlag station another source gives a different origin for the entrance building. An 1885 plan of the station indicates it was moved from Horst station (now in Gelsenkirchen) to Derschlag.

=== Completion to the end of the First World War ===
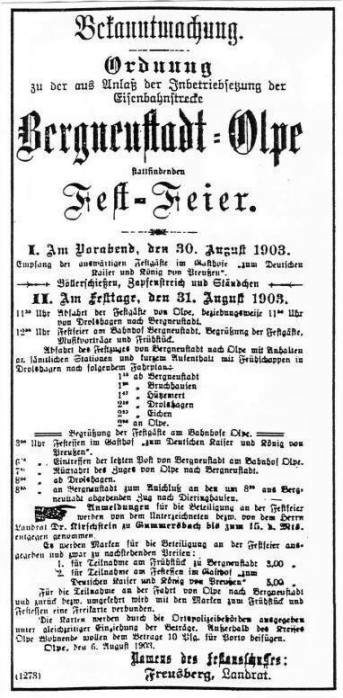
Public notice for the opening ceremony of the Bergneustadt–Olpe section

On 15 October 1884, the first train ran from Siegburg on the newly completed line to Ründeroth. It was initially frequented by only four pairs of trains. Protests led by local industrialists meant that the line was extended to Bergneustadt. The line came under direction of the railway division (Eisenbahndirektion) at Frankfurt in 1895 but almost all of it (from the 0.7 kilometer point) was transferred to the railway division at Elberfeld in 1897.

In 1893, in the Volme Valley Railway was built branching from Dieringhausen to Gummersbach station at the same time the original Niedersessmar station was renamed Gummersbach, where it is actually located. In 1897, the Wiehl Valley Railway, which branched from Osberghausen towards Waldbröl, was completed, which meant that Osberghausen station became a marshaling point.

Finally a line closing the gap to Olpe was approved in 1898. A height difference to the watershed to the Dörspe valley had to be overcome. The Wegeringhausen tunnel was also built nearby. The construction was problematic and its cost rose to nearly twice the estimate. It was completed on 11 February 1903. This newly built section of track was especially important for the villages between Bergneustadt and Olpe. These were previously connected by poorly maintained roads and trails and the area and had not even been connected by telegraph. Therefore, the population enthusiastically celebrated its completion for several hours, despite the long connecting times to Siegburg and Cologne. At the completion of the extension to Olpe, five pairs of passenger trains ran between Siegburg and Olpe and four more between Siegburg and Bergneustadt.

In 1910, the still operating section between Overath and Cologne was completed, ending through services between Siegburg and the Oberbergische district. This had a negative economic impact on Siegburg, because passengers now took the shorter, direct route to Cologne. The travel time from the Bergisches Land to Cologne was shortened to one and a half hours by the elimination of the detour via Siegburg and the old Siegburg–Overath route lost its importance.

Between 1910 and 1914, the line was relaid in many places on the hillside, as there had been many fatal traffic accidents and complaints of noise pollution in the area between Osberghausen and Derschlag. Between Niedersessmar and Derschlag the old track was used by passenger and freight trams operated at lower speed by the Gummersbach Light Railways (Gummersbacher Kleinbahnen). Between Vollmerhausen and Niedersessmar the old track was completely removed.

In 1913, a line was proposed to Eckenhagen. This 6.9 km long line was approved in March 1914, but the outbreak of the First World War, prevented its construction. Similarly, it was proposed in the 1920s to extend the Gummersbach Light Railways to Eckenhagen.

=== Weimar Republic to the end of the Second World War ===
The high reparations required by the Versailles Treaty led to a shortage of rolling stock and a limited timetable. But the occupation of the Ruhr in 1923, when the French occupied the Ruhr region, meant that it became an important route for diverted coal trains. Thus the Agger Valley Railway towards Olpe along with the Wiehl Valley Railway and the Wisser Valley Railway (Wissertalbahn) and its connection to the Volme Valley Railway was one of the main lines in the new Weimar Republic for a few months. Due to the large amounts of heavy trains that ran on the line to the east, the cheaply built superstructure was damaged. The repairing of this damage took some time.

In 1927, a direct service to Cologne was opened. In this case, however, the Volme Valley Railway connection to the north was preferred to running to Olpe. Express trains to the north in 1931 included a connection from Wuppertal over the Wipper Valley Railway (Wippertalbahn), the Volme Valley Railway and the Agger Valley Railway to Olpe.

During the construction of Agger Valley Dam (Aggertalsperre) there was a high volume of commuters by immigrant workers to Derschlag, changing to the Gummersbach Light Railways to continue through Dümmlinghausen to Genkelmündung. A specially decorated pair of trains was operated for the transport of these workers to Derschlag, running from Cologne to Derschlag on Mondays and returning on Saturdays.

During World War II, mobile guns were installed on the line in Hützemert because the east-west link again played an important role as a diversion route. From 1943, the Oberbergische district was repeatedly bombed by the Royal Air Force and the United States Army Air Forces. Because of the stationed guns, the station and the railway depot in Dieringhausen were hit by a total of fifteen massive air raids by the end of the war. Among other things, the western half of the large entrance building and the eastern half of the roundhouse and turntable were destroyed. Part of the roundhouse was never rebuilt. The diversion route stopped because of destruction to the west by German troops under Hitler’s scorched earth policy. Among other things, the Hoffnungsthal tunnel was destroyed by German troops. All trains had to operate via Siegburg.

=== After the Second World War ===
The reopening of the Hoffnungsthal tunnel on 14 May 1949 led to the abandonment of some rail services between Siegburg and Overath, there were now only local services. From 1949, all passenger services ran to Cologne. The Deutsche Bundesbahn railway division (Bundesbahndirektion) at Wuppertal informed locals from 1950 of the proposed closure of the western section, which took place after the thinning of services in 1954. Passenger services ended in 1956 due to roadworks.

Between Siegburg and Overath the steam train service was affectionately known as the Luhmer Grietche. At the beginning of the 1950s, the era of steam trains ended on the line. The steam trains were replaced by Uerdinger railbuses. However, it was reported that railbuses were often overcrowded especially for the carriage of school children in Bergneustadt. In addition, changes were required from Olpe–Dieringhausen services to services to Cologne. The transfer times in Dieringhausen were getting longer and meant that many passengers preferred buses. Deutsche Bundesbahn itself increasingly operated its own buses (Bahnbus), competing with its own rail services. There was an upsurge in passenger during the construction of the Bigge Valley Railway and the subsequent excursion trains and other tourist trains operated.

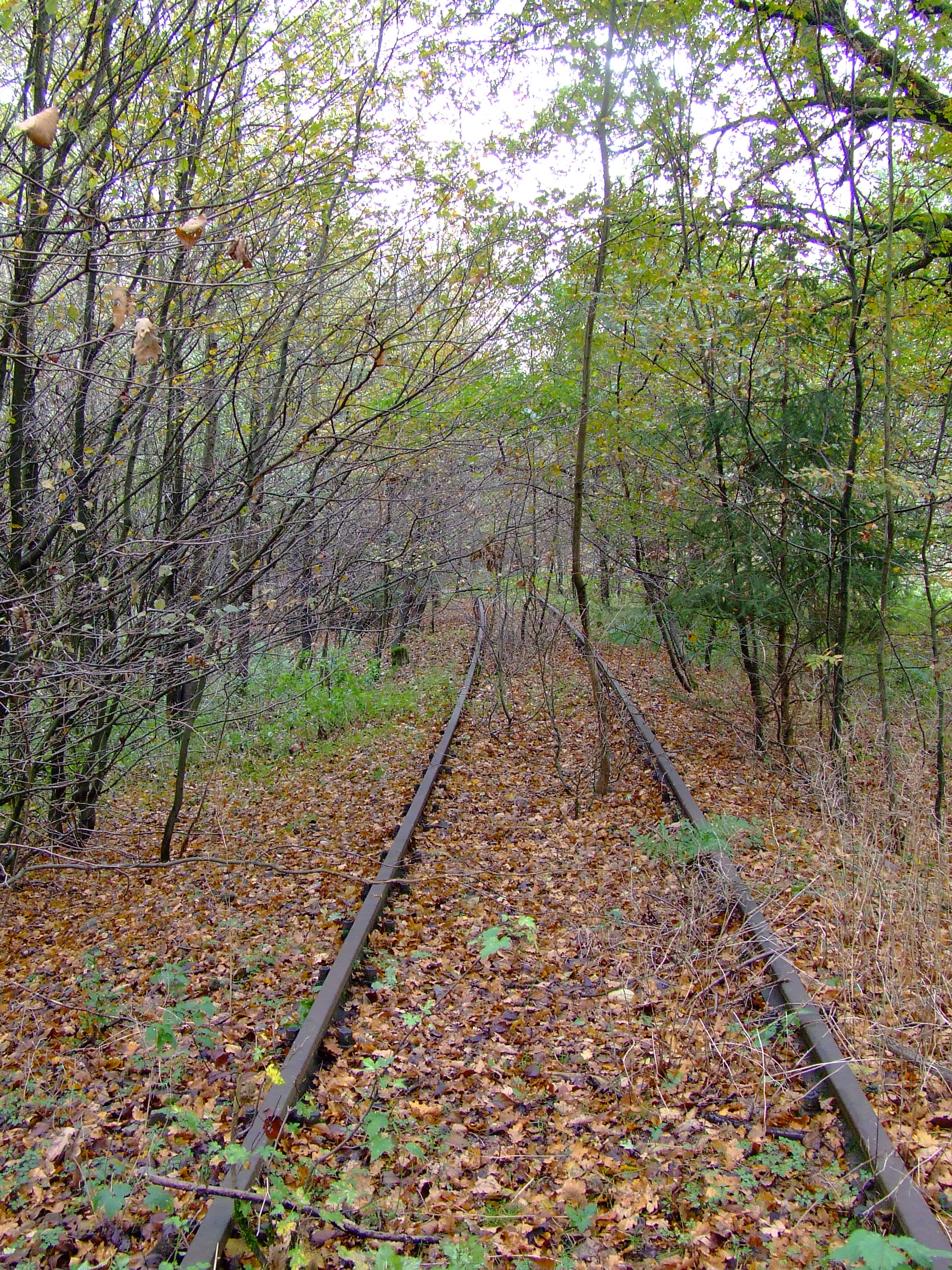
The line between Siegburg and Lohmar was closed in 1989

Hopes for a resumption of passenger service between Siegburg and Overath were dashed in 1959 with the issue of a license to close the line. In 1960, closure procedures commenced for the transport of freight between Lohmar and Overath, which were completed in 1962. The line between Lohmar and Overath was dismantled in the same year. The remaining part of the line between Siegburg and Lohmar was transferred to the jurisdiction of the railway division at Cologne.

The last regular passenger service operated between Olpe and Dieringhausen on 28 December 1979 despite protests from the public and local politicians.

Deutsche Bundesbahn closed freight operations between Bergneustadt and Wiedenest in 1985. An embankment collapsed due to poor construction near Wiedenest on 27 May 1989 and freight operations from Bergneustadt to Drolshagen were abandoned and the section was closed.

In 1993, the penultimate special passenger excursion train derailed in Derschlag. The damaged track was blocked and was beyond repair. The last passenger excursion train ran on 27 August 1993.

Freight traffic closed between Drolshagen and Eichen in 1991 and between Eichen and Olpe in 1993. On 13 May 1994, a class 290 diesel locomotive hauled the last freight wagon from Bergneustadt to Dieringhausen. Freight trains ran only between Dieringhausen and Niedersessmar until 1997, when the remaining track was closed.
