= Cologne/Bonn Airport station =

Station at Cologne Bonn Airport

Köln/Bonn Flughafen
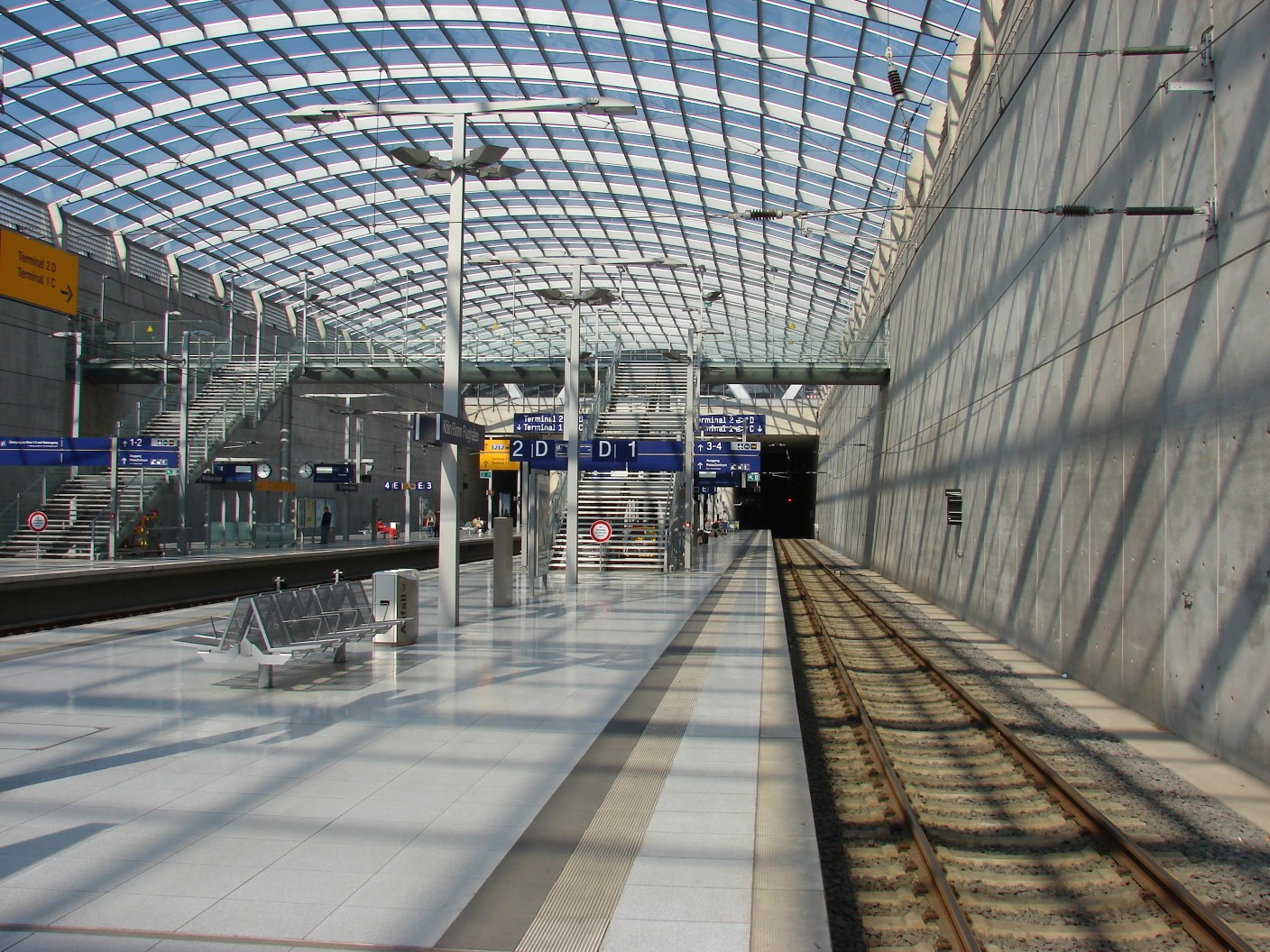

General information
- Location: Waldstr. 247; 51147 Köln, Porz, NRW; Germany
- Coordinates: 50°52′44″N 7°7′10″E
- Owner: Deutsche Bahn
- Operator: DB Netz; DB Station&Service
- Line: Cologne Airport loop
- Platforms: 2 island platforms
- Tracks: 4

Construction
- Structure type: underground
- Accessible: Yes

Other information
- Station code: 4762
- DS100 code: KFKB
- Category: 3
- Fare zone: VRS: 2100
- Website: www.bahnhof.de

History
- Opened: 12 June 2004

Services
Preceding station	DB Fernverkehr	Following station
Köln Messe/Deutz towards Berlin Gesundbrunnen	ICE 10 select trains only	Terminus
Köln Hbf Terminus	ICE 45	Montabaur towards Stuttgart Hbf or Frankfurt (Main) Hbf
Preceding station	DB Regio NRW	Following station
Köln Messe/Deutz towards Mönchengladbach Hbf	RB 27	Troisdorf towards Koblenz Hbf
Preceding station	National Express Germany	Following station
Köln Messe/Deutz towards Minden (Westfalen)	RE 6 (Rhein-Weser-Express)	Terminus
Preceding station	Cologne S-Bahn	Following station
Köln-Frankfurter Straße towards Düren	S19	Porz-Wahn towards Au (Sieg)
Location

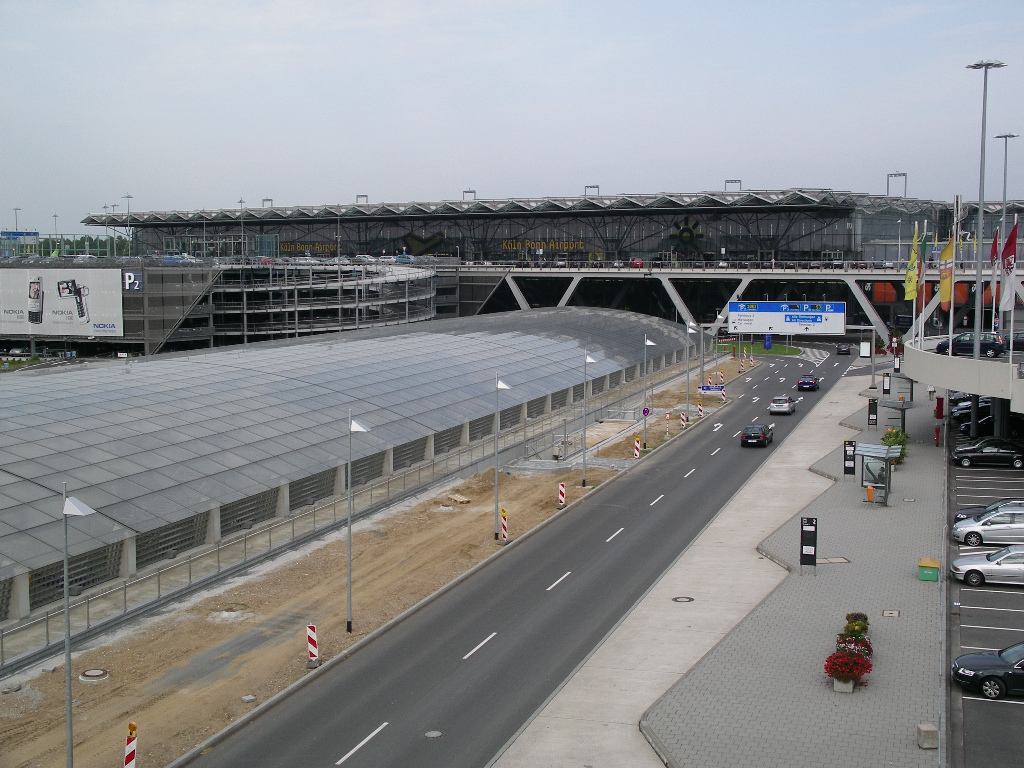
Terminal 2 with glass roof of the station hall

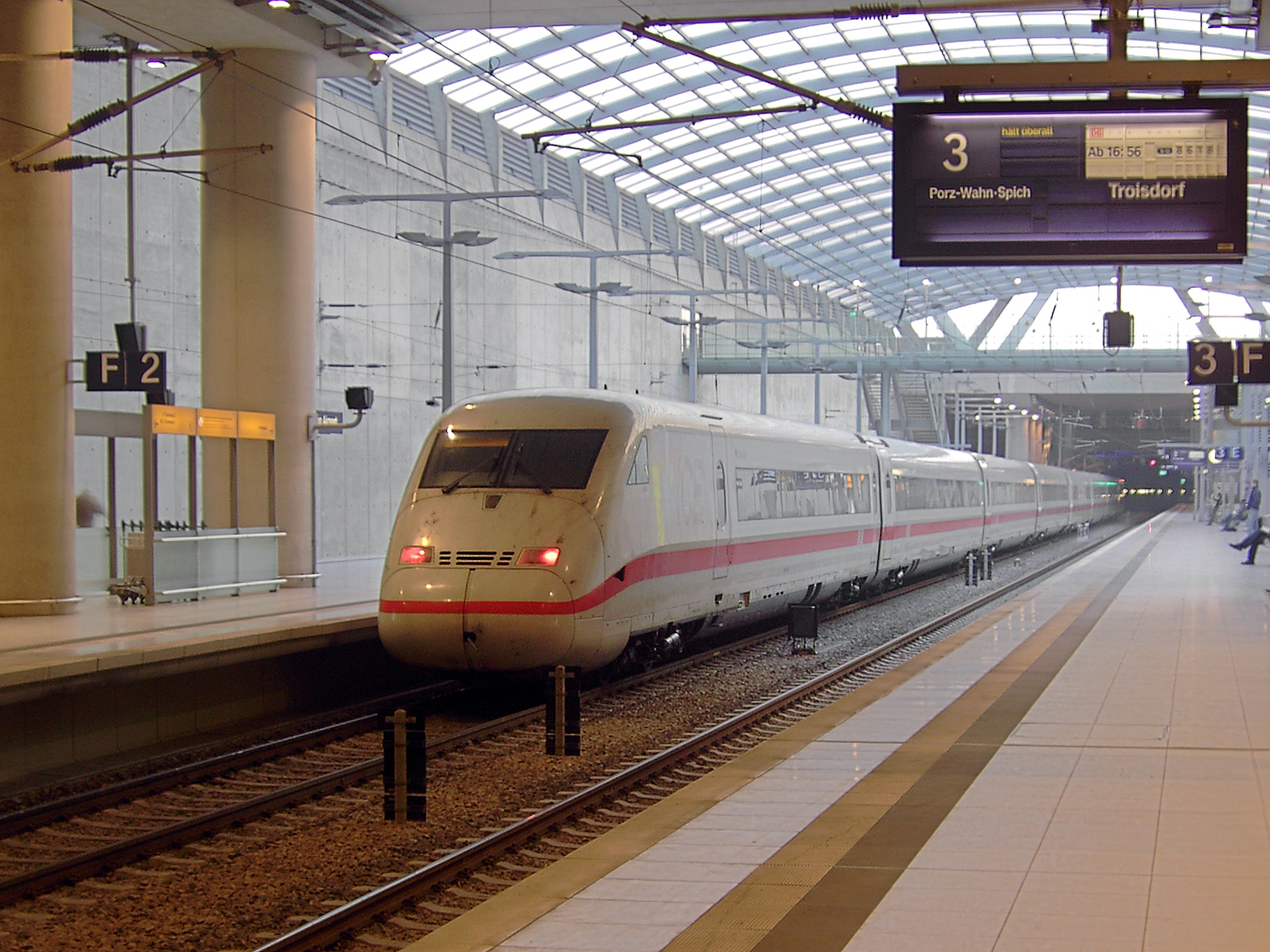
ICE 2 in station

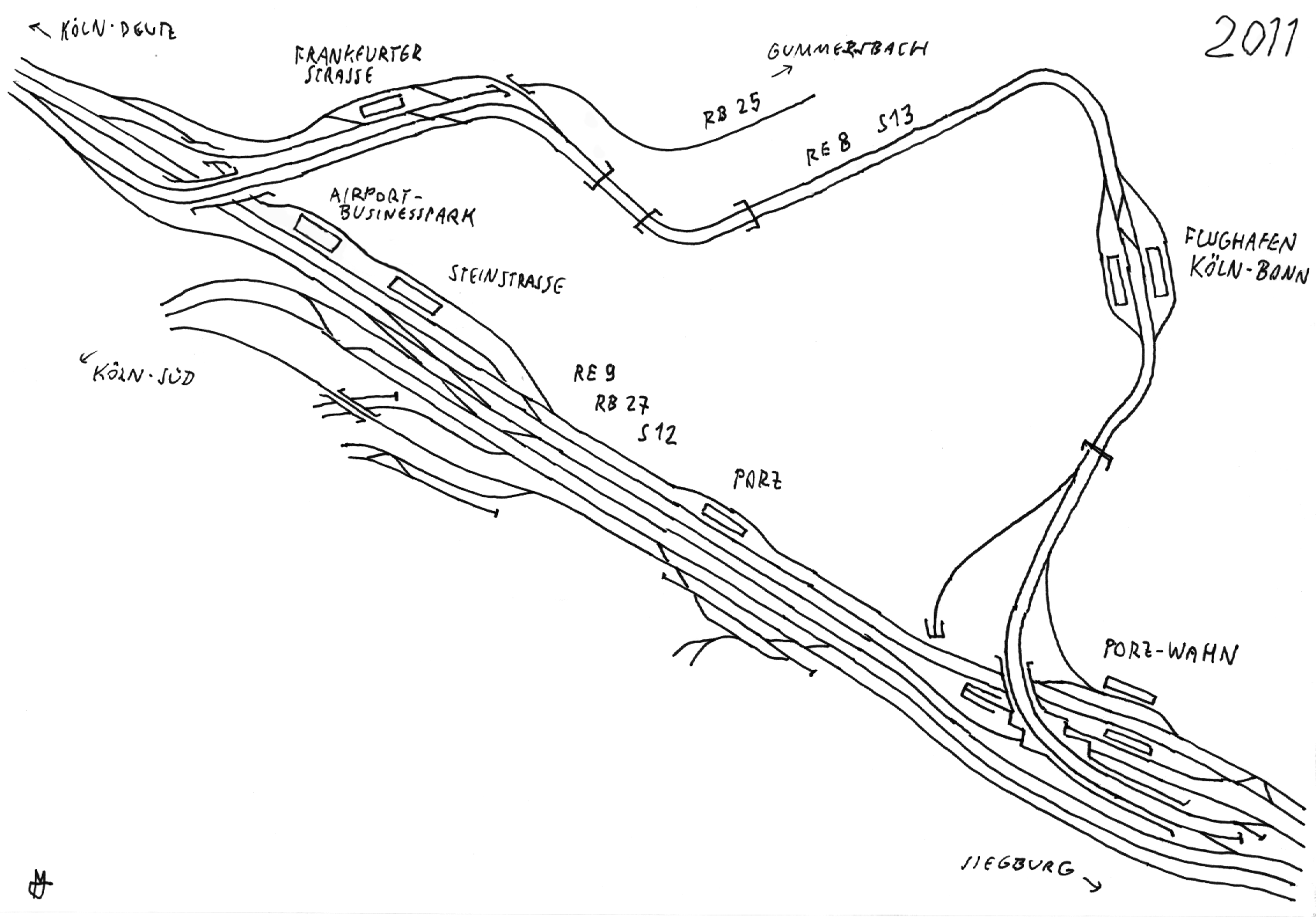
Track plan of the airport loop with its connections to the high-speed line

Cologne/Bonn Airport station (German: Bahnhof Köln/Bonn Flughafen) is a station at Cologne Bonn Airport in the German state of North Rhine-Westphalia. It was built as part of the Cologne–Frankfurt high-speed rail line and opened in June 2004 on the approximately 15-kilometre-long (9.3 mi) Cologne Airport loop line. It is served by Intercity-Express (ICE), Cologne S-Bahn and regional services.

The Cologne Bonn airport was the third German airport to have a connection to the ICE network after Frankfurt Airport and Düsseldorf Airport.

The approximately 420 m (1,380 ft)-long and 40 m (130 ft)-wide underground station is classified by Deutsche Bahn as a category 3 station. The four platform tracks are located 18 m (59 ft) below the surface.

In 2002, the projected construction cost of the station stood at €58.3 million. It was funded by the federal government, the state of North Rhine-Westphalia and the Cologne Bonn Airport. In total, the federal government contributed approximately €255 million to the construction costs of the airport loop and station.

== Infrastructure ==
The station has two island platforms, each bordered by two tracks, between concrete walls under an arched glass roof. A large glass-walled staircase in the middle of the platforms is provided for transfer passengers to change platforms and leads to one of the emergency exits. Escalators and lifts from the platform lead to the basement of terminal 2. The difference in height between rail and platform edge on the outer tracks is 76 cm (30 in). The central tracks are laid a little lower, so that their platforms are 96 cm (38 in) high above the rail. The high S-Bahn sets stop at the low platforms, which cannot be avoided for operational reasons.

The two island platforms are 405 m (1,329 ft) long and 9.4 m (31 ft) wide.

Crossovers at the north end of the station allow trains to change tracks between the two main platform tracks, allowing ICE services from the north to terminate and reverse, but there are no crossovers at the south end.

The station, which is located in the area between the two airport terminals, is spanned over a length of 156 m (512 ft) with a 36 m (118 ft)-wide steel and glass roof. The 540 tonne roof covers an area of 6,100 square metres (66,000 sq ft).

In June 2007, a two-story connecting building was built at the southern end of the station as a check-in area for Terminal 1 B; this has a steel and glass facade with an area of 1,400 m^{2} (15,000 sq ft). There was previously only a temporary exit next to the access road. Two escalators and a lift were built as part of the construction.

The platforms have alternating signs: Köln/Bonn Flughafen and Köln/Bonn Airport.

== History ==
The link to the airport was proposed as part the Federal Cabinet's decision on 20 December 1989 to build the new high-speed line on the eastern side of the Rhine.

It also benefitted from the Berlin-Bonn Act of 26 April 1994, which compensated the Bonn region for the relocation of the parliament and parts of the federal government to Berlin. The operator of the airport hoped that the construction of the station, which would strengthen connection between transport modes, would stimulate growth, including of the number of passengers using the airport. Originally, the station, as set out in the design competition, was to be built in a covered tunnel, but instead it was built with a large glass roof. Nevertheless, it is an underground station and is also referred to as such by Deutsche Bahn. So smoking is banned as in other underground stations in Germany.

=== Planning ===
The building was designed by the architectural firm Murphy/Jahn, which had already designed terminal 2.

With the opening of the Cologne-Frankfurt high-speed railway, two ICE and three S-Bahn trains could run each hour in each direction through the station. According to the estimates of 1995, about 30 percent of passengers would in future travel to the airport by train.

=== Construction ===
The station was constructed in three sections. In the middle section the construction workers encountered during excavation lignite and gravel that could be used directly as a building material, saving construction costs.

After the two ends of the station were created during the reconstruction of the airport in the autumn of 2001, the station building was intended to be an aesthetically-sophisticated centre piece. On 29 January 2002, Norbert Rüther, Ernst Schwanhold, Hartmut Mehdorn and Angelika Mertens performed its groundbreaking ceremony. It was opened on 12 June 2004 in the presence of German Chancellor Gerhard Schröder.

A connecting structure between the station and Terminal 1 was built from May 2006 to June 2007. Deutsche Bahn owns this building, which cost €6 million. It was also designed by the Murphy/Jahn architecture firm.

The construction of the station was the final component of a comprehensive concept for the airport, Terminal 2000, costing more than €500 million. The catchment area of the airport was increased with the new station to more than 20 million people.

=== Operations ===
The number of daily ICE trains was reduced from eight to six pairs of trains in 2007 as a result of low demand.

=== S-Bahn connections ===
The construction of the airport loop was, for the most part, financed by funds under the Berlin–Bonn Act, especially to improve connections from the Bonn/Rhine-Sieg region to the airport. Currently only Cologne and—Troisdorf in the Rhein-Sieg district—have direct connections to the airport via line S19 (formerly line S13) of the S-Bahn, providing a service every 20 minutes on week days. There is an hourly service to the airport station via Regional-Express line RE 6 (the Rhein-Weser-Express) to Minden and the Regionalbahn RB 27 (the Rhein-Erft-Bahn) along the East Rhine Railway (Cologne–Troisdorf–Bonn-Beuel). Frequent connections are not possible, since the line carries dense freight traffic. A new track (in parts two) are planned to be built along the line from Troisdorf to Bonn-Oberkassel so that services on line S 13 can be re-established and extended from Horrem via Cologne Hauptbahnhof, the airport and Troisdorf to Oberkassel. It is planned that another service would run via Bad Honnef to Linz am Rhein. No decision has yet been taken to re-establish line S 13.

== Rail services ==
The following rail services stop at Cologne/Bonn Airport station as of 2025:

Line	Route	Frequency
ICE 10	Berlin Gesundbrunnen – Berlin Hbf – Hannover Hbf – Bielefeld Hbf – Hamm (Westf) – Dortmund Hbf – Duisburg Hbf – Düsseldorf Hbf (– Köln Messe/Deutz – Cologne/Bonn Airport)	Individual services
ICE 41	(Dortmund Hbf –) Essen Hbf – Duisburg Hbf – Düsseldorf Hbf – Köln Messe/Deutz (– Cologne/Bonn Airport) – Frankfurt Airport – Frankfurt (Main) Hbf – Würzburg Hbf – Nuremberg Hbf – Munich Hbf	Individual services
ICE 45	Cologne Hbf – Cologne/Bonn Airport – Montabaur – Limburg Süd – Wiesbaden Hbf – Mainz – Darmstadt – Mannheim – Heidelberg – Stuttgart	Individual services
ICE 49	(Dortmund – Hagen – Wuppertal – Solingen –) Cologne Hbf – Cologne/Bonn Airport – Siegburg/Bonn – Montabaur – Limburg Süd – Frankfurt Airport – Frankfurt (Main) Hbf	Individual services
RE 6	Minden – Herford – Bielefeld – Hamm – Dortmund – Essen – Duisburg – Düsseldorf Airport – Düsseldorf Hbf – Neuss – Cologne Hbf – Cologne/Bonn Airport	Hourly
RB 27	Mönchengladbach Hbf – Cologne Hbf – Köln Messe/Deutz – Cologne/Bonn Airport – Troisdorf – Bonn-Beuel – Königswinter – Neuwied – Koblenz-Ehrenbreitstein – Koblenz Hbf	Hourly
S19	Düren – Horrem – Cologne Hbf – Köln Messe/Deutz – Cologne/Bonn Airport – Troisdorf – (Hennef (Sieg) (– Herchen – Au (Sieg))	Every 20 minutes

== See also ==
- Rail transport in Germany
- Railway stations in Germany
