= Dieringhausen Railway Museum =

Coordinates: 50°36′13″N 7°13′10″E

- Eisenbahnmuseum Dieringhausen
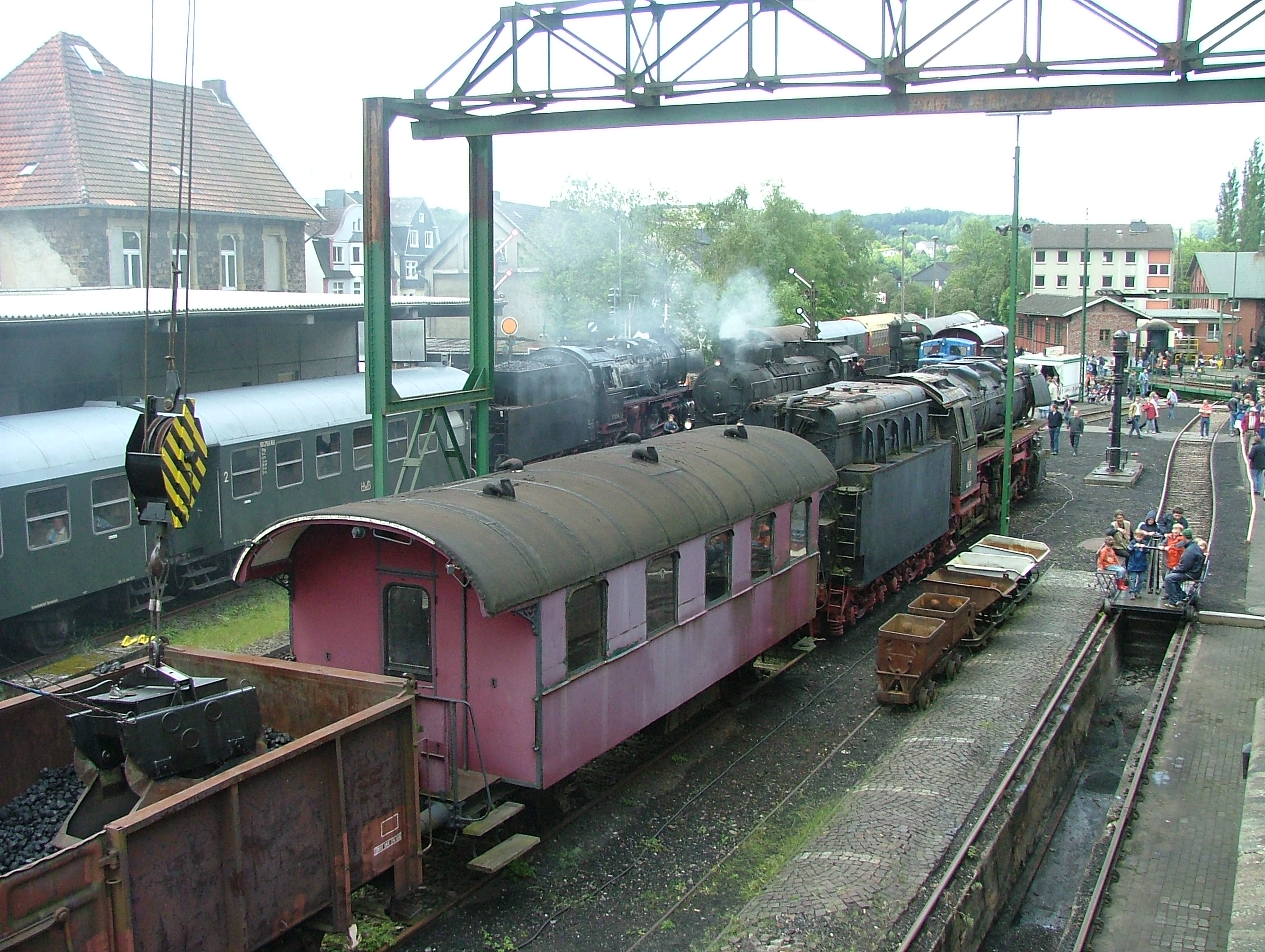
- Centenary of the locomotive depot in June 2006
- Established: 1982
- Location: Dieringhausen, Germany
- Type: Railway history museum
- Website: eisenbahnmuseum-dieringhausen.de

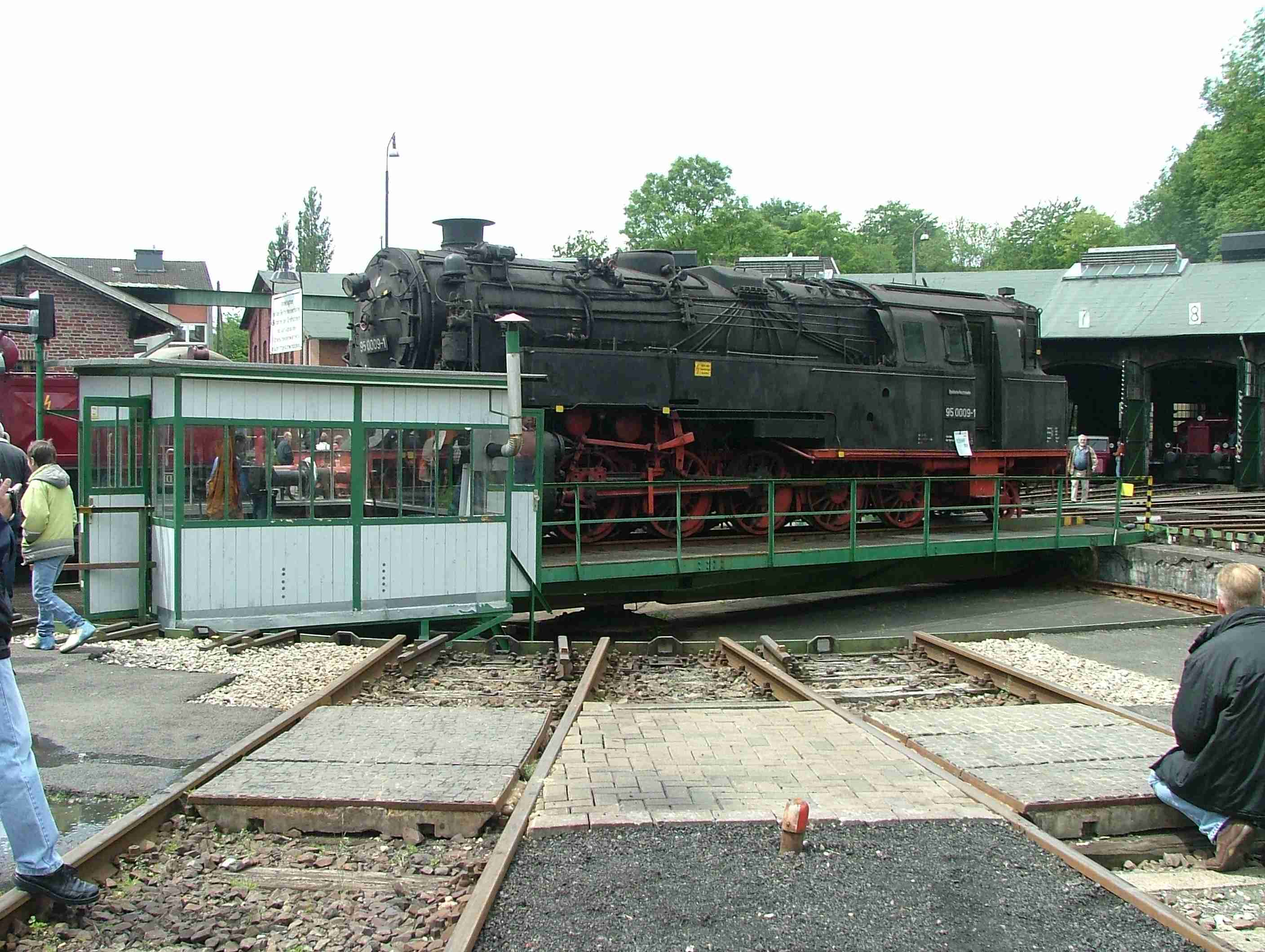
Dieringhausen turntable

The Dieringhausen Railway Museum (Eisenbahnmuseum Dieringhausen) is a railway history museum in Dieringhausen in the district of Oberbergischer Kreis in North Rhine-Westphalia, Germany.

It is located on the site of the former Deutsche Bundesbahn locomotive depot at Dieringhausen and is a protected historical monument with 2.7 acres (11,000 m^{2}) of land. After railway operations had ceased on 1 May 1982, a society was founded with the aim of forming and running a museum. That same year the first museum festival was celebrated.

== Installations ==
The site has a historical locomotive roundhouse with twelve roads and their associated turntable. Even the equipment of the former steam depot can be seen. A cafeteria and bookshop have been established for visitors.

The museum has a fleet of eleven steam locomotives, eleven diesel locomotives, four electric locomotives and a collection of railway wagons. In early 2007 the DRB Class 52 tender locomotive, 8095, was sold to the Vulkan-Eifel-Bahn Betriebsgesellschaft mbH, based at Gerolstein. A planned sale of the DRB Class 50 goods train steam locomotive, number 3610-8, fell through. So it was hired to the DRWI (see below) until its inspection licence ran out in December 2007.

The Prussian P 8 steam engine P8 2455 "Posen" from the firm of "Länderbahnreisen / Manuel Jußen", Marburg, is also stationed at Dieringhausen.

The DRWI (Dampfbahn Rur-Wurm-Inde), formerly based at the museum, left in early 2007 with several wagons and the steam locomotive 52 8148. Its new home is in Mönchengladbach.
