= Köln Trimbornstraße station =

Railway station in Cologne, Germany

Köln Trimbornstraße
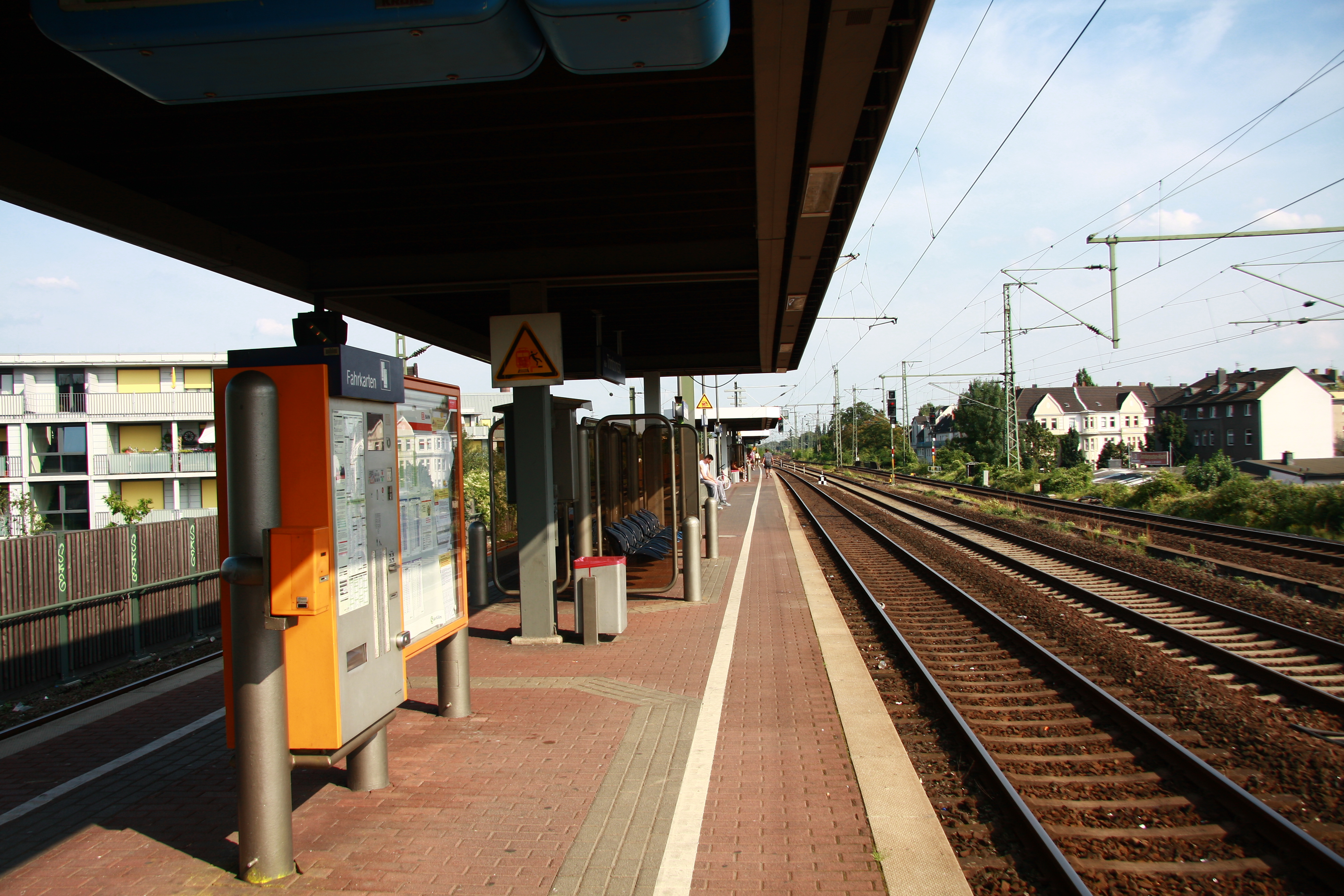

General information
- Location: Trimbornstr. 38, Cologne, NRW; Germany
- Coordinates: 50°56′08″N 6°59′50″E
- Lines: Sieg Railway; East Rhine Railway

Construction
- Accessible: Yes

Other information
- Station code: 3322
- DS100 code: KKTR
- IBNR: 8003320
- Category: 5
- Fare zone: VRS: 2100
- Website: www.bahnhof.de

History
- Opened: 2 June 1991

Services
Preceding station	DB Regio NRW	Following station
Köln Messe/Deutz towards Köln Hansaring	RB 25	Köln Frankfurter Straße towards Lüdenscheid
Preceding station	Cologne S-Bahn	Following station
Köln Messe/Deutz towards Horrem	S12	Köln Airport-Businesspark towards Au (Sieg)
Köln Messe/Deutz towards Düren	S19	Köln Frankfurter Straße towards Au (Sieg)
Location
- Location within North Rhine-Westphalia

Köln Trimbornstraße is a railway station situated at Kalk, Cologne in the German state of North Rhine-Westphalia on the Sieg and East Rhine Railways. It was opened on 2 June 1991 on a railway that was originally built as part of the Deutz–Gießen railway on 1 January 1859.

Köln Trimbornstraße station is served by Cologne S-Bahn lines S12 between Düren or Köln-Ehrenfeld and Troisdorf every 20 minutes and S19 between Düren and Hennef (Sieg), Blankenberg (Sieg), Herchen or Au (Sieg) every 20 minutes Monday–Saturday. Together these provide services every 10 minutes through Cologne Monday–Saturday and four services an hour on Sunday. It is classified by Deutsche Bahn as a category 5 station.

The KVB light rail station of Kalk Post is located within 200m walking distance from here.
