= Dortmund-Märkische Eisenbahn =

German railway company, 1999 to 2004

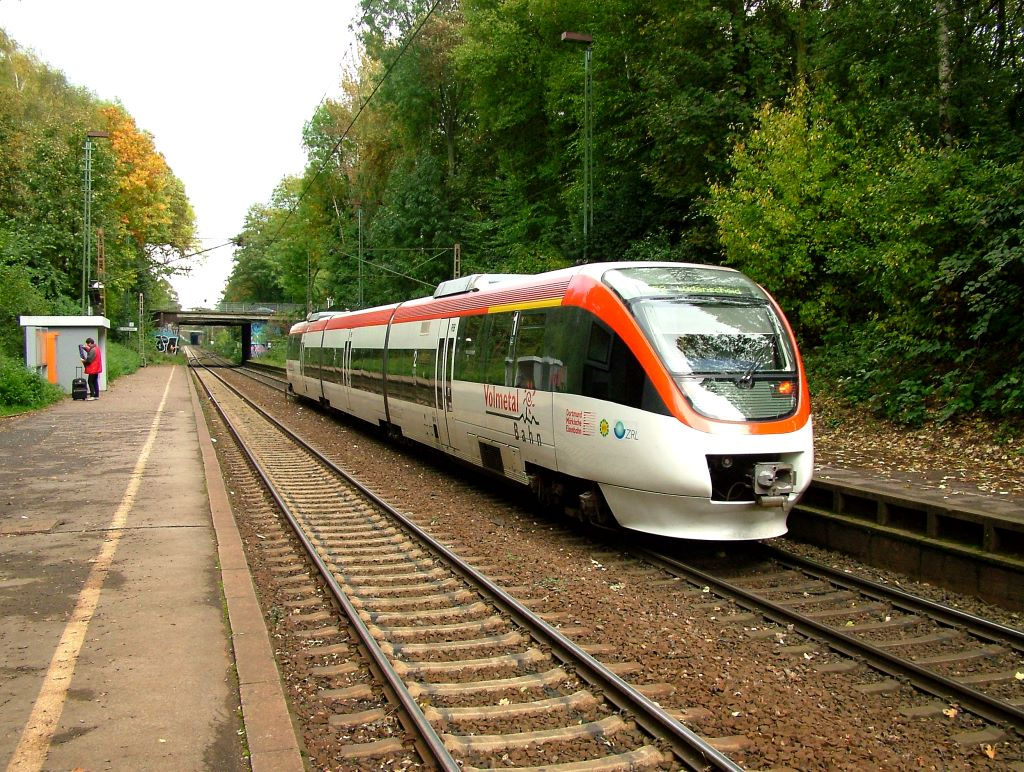
- A DME train at Dortmund Westfalenhalle station (today Signal Iduna Park)

Overview
- Franchises: RB52 Volmetalbahn (30 May 1999–11 December 2004)
- Main regions: North Rhine-Westphalia, Germany
- Fleet: 4 Bombardier Talent
- Stations called at: 15
- Parent company: Dortmunder Stadtwerke (74%); Märkische Verkehrsgesellschaft (26%)
- Headquarters: Dortmund, Germany
- Reporting mark: DME
- Dates of operation: 1999–2004
- Predecessor: DB Regio (Deutsche Bahn)
- Successor: DB Regio (Deutsche Bahn)

Technical
- Track gauge: 1,435 mm (4 ft 8 1/2 in) standard gauge
- Length: 56.1 kilometres (34.9 mi)
Route map
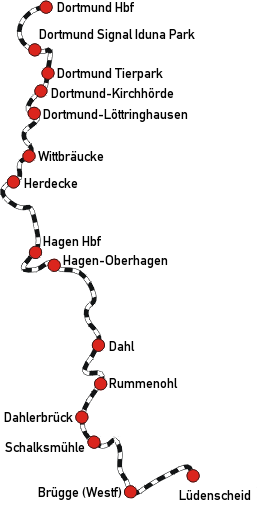

The Dortmund-Märkische Eisenbahn GmbH (DME) was a German train operating company, that operated the Dortmund–Hagen–Lüdenscheid train service (route RB52) from 30 May 1999 to 11 December 2004. It was a subsidiary of the Dortmunder Stadtwerke (74%) and the Märkische Verkehrsgesellschaft (26%), the municipal public transport operators of Dortmund and Märkischer Kreis.

== History ==
As part of the German rail reform after German reunification, regulation of regional train services passed from federal to state (Länder) control in 1996. In North Rhine-Westphalia, the state established regional rail authorities (Aufgabenträger). Two of them, Verkehrsverbund Rhein-Ruhr (VRR) and Zweckverband SPNV Ruhr-Lippe (ZRL) put the operation of route RB52, operated hitherto by Deutsche Bahn, out to tender as a pilot project. In 1996, the bidding consortium of Dortmunder Stadtwerke and Märkischer Verkehrsgesellschaft won this tender, they then founded the DME on 11 September 1997. After acquiring rolling stock, DME started operation on 30 May 1999. It was the first private railway (non-DB rail company) to win a competitive tender of rail operations in North Rhine-Westphalia.

In 2002, route RB52 was tendered out by VRR and ZRL once again, this time as part of the Sauerland-Netz, together with routes RE57 (Dortmund – Arnsberg – Bestwig – Winterberg), RB53 (Dortmund – Schwerte – Iserlohn) and RB54 (Unna – Fröndenberg – Menden – Neuenrade). DME took part in this competition, but lost to DB Regio NRW. Since 12 December 2004, that rail company has thus been running on the former DME route.

The company, which was registered at the Dortmund Amtsgericht under HRB 12798, was then dissolved on 10 January 2006, the specially trained employees seconded to DME in 1999 were taken over again by Dortmunder Stadtwerke or Märkische Verkehrsgesellschaft and the four vehicles were sold. After the settlement of the transport contracts and the resolution of disputes regarding vehicle financing and the accidents, the company ceased to exist on 8 September 2011.

== Operation ==
The DME operated the Regionalbahn route RB 52 with the brand name Volmetalbahn, running between Dortmund Hbf and Lüdenscheid stations. From North to South, this route used the following railway lines:

- Dortmund–Soest railway, between Dortmund Hbf and Dortmund Westfalenhalle,
- Düsseldorf-Derendorf–Dortmund Süd railway, between Dortmund Westfalenhalle and Hagen Hbf,
- Hagen–Dieringhausen railway, the eponymous Volmetalbahn, between Hagen Hbf and Brügge, and,
- Brügge–Lüdenscheid railway, on its entire length.

VRR was the responsible regional rail authority for the cities of Dortmund and Hagen, and the Ennepe-Ruhr-Kreis for the section between Dortmund Hbf and Hagen-Rummenohl, and ZRL for the Märkischer Kreis for the section between Schalksmühle-Dahlerbrück and Lüdenscheid. Within the VRR its fares applied, within the ZRL the fares of the Verkehrsgemeinschaft Ruhr-Lippe (VRL).

The timetable consisted of a daily hourly service in both directions, stopping at all stations. It began Mondays to Fridays at 5 am, Saturdays at 6 am, Sundays at 8 am, and ended daily at 10 pm.

== Rolling stock ==
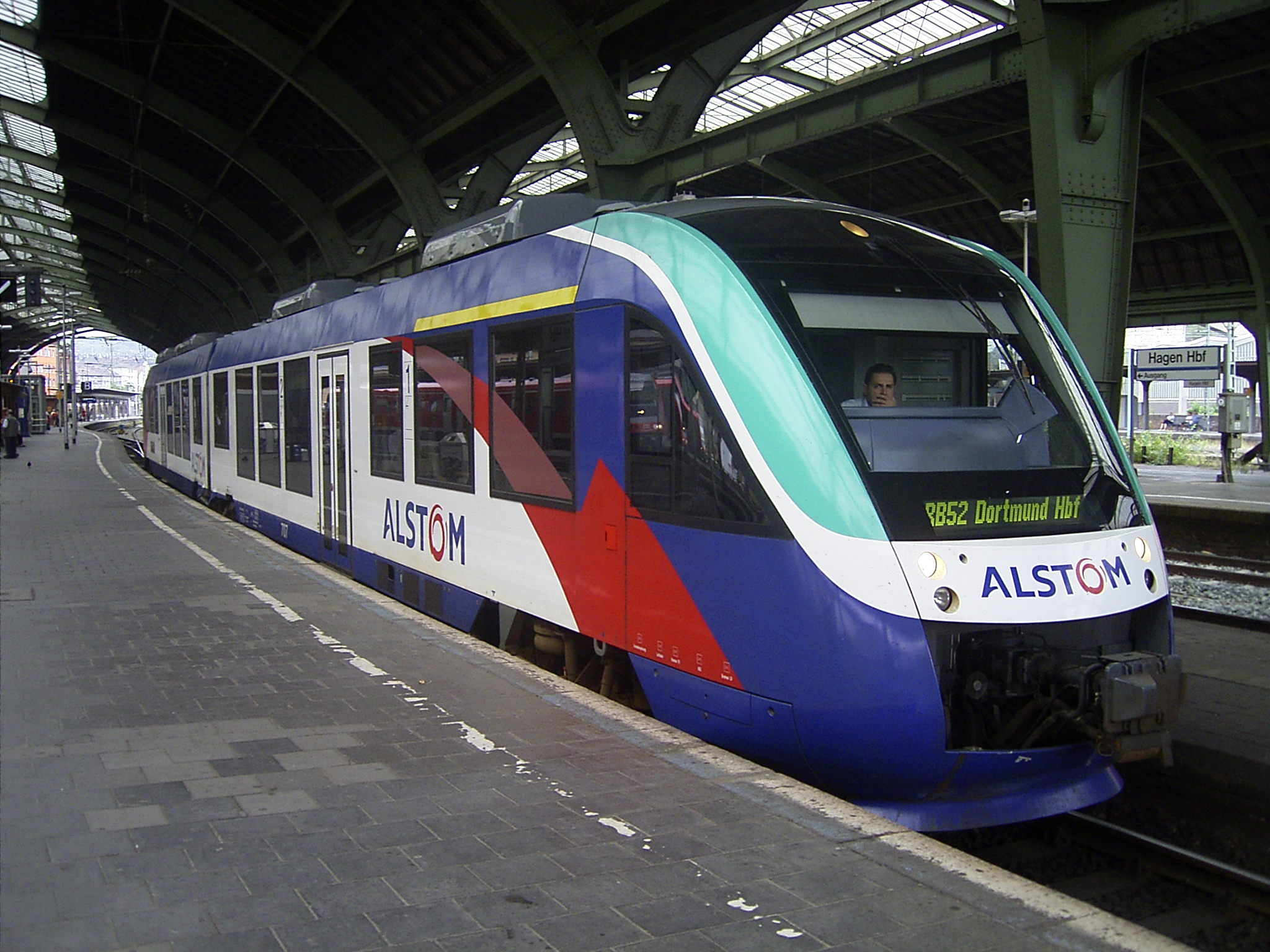
The demonstration car for the LINT 41 from Alstom, which was used instead of an accident-damaged Talent, waits in Hagen for its departure

The DME used four three-part diesel multiple units (VT 01.101, VT 01.102, VT 01.103 und VT 01.104) of the type Bombardier Talent with 1st and 2nd class, with one DMU always used as a reserve. Maintenance was carried out in the workshops of the Dortmunder Eisenbahn.

Several times, vehicles were damaged in accidents; a shunting accident on 26 August 2002 was particularly consequential, after which two of the four vehicles were out of service for six months. Vehicles from other railway companies were rented as replacements, including identical Talent DMUs from Ostmecklenburgische Eisenbahn, a Regio-Sprinter from Dürener Kreisbahn, two MAN rail buses from Karsdorfer Eisenbahngesellschaft and a demonstration vehicle of the LINT 41 by Alstom LHB.

After the DME ended its services, the four vehicles were bought by the rolling stock leasing company Alpha Trains. They were then leased to Eurobahn and NordWestBahn, today, all four DMUs are in service as 643 124, 121, 122 and 123 for Transdev Regio Ost (Mitteldeutsche Regiobahn).

== Literature ==
- Christian Kuhlmann: Regionalisierung des Schienenpersonennahverkehrs – Chancen und Grenzen. Tectum, Marburg 2002, ISBN 3-8288-5106-1.
