= Brügge–Lüdenscheid railway =

German railway line

Lüdenscheid-Brügge–Lüdenscheid
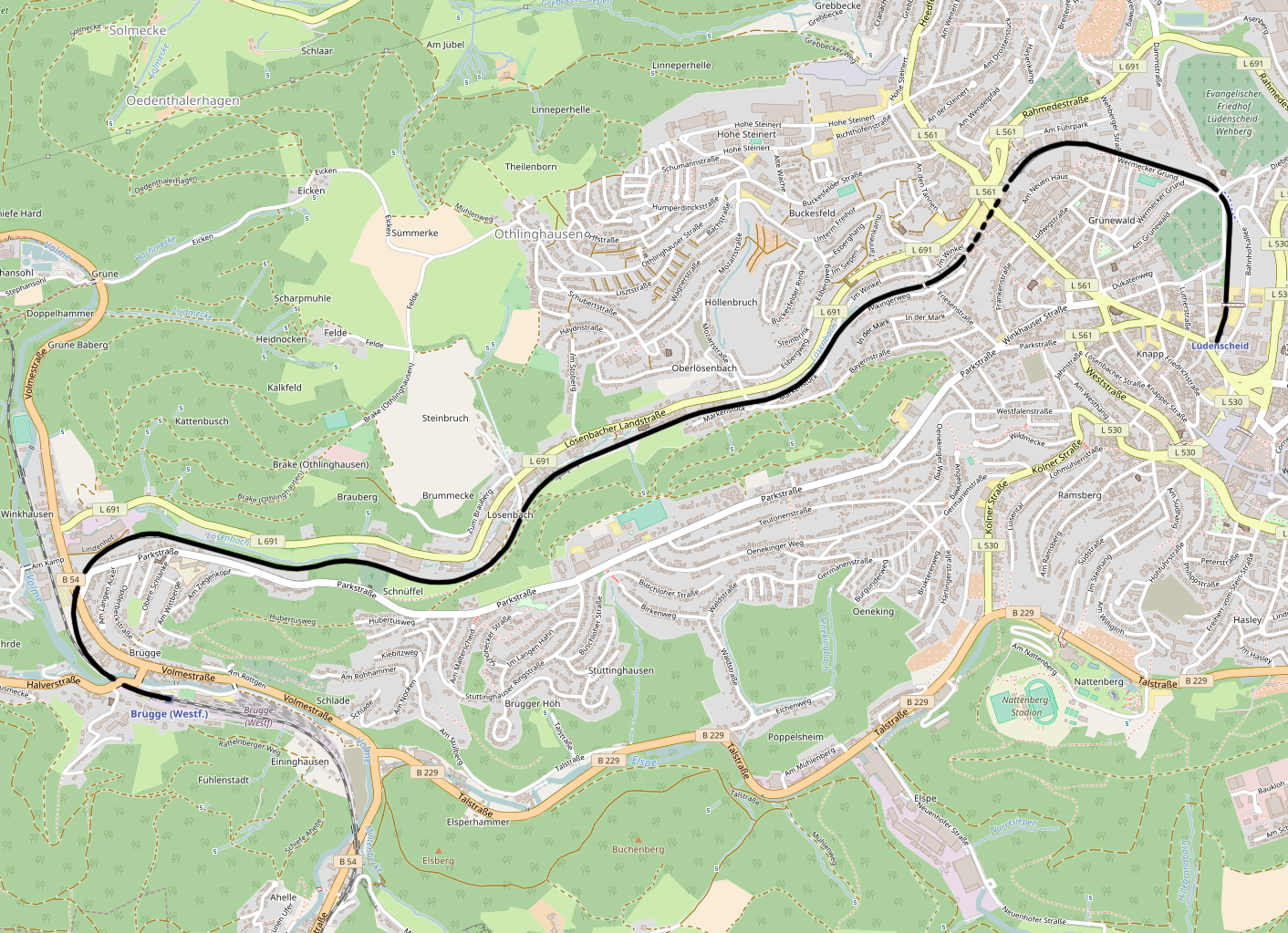

Overview
- Line number: 2813
- Locale: North Rhine-Westphalia, Germany

Service
- Route number: 434, 240e (1944)

Technical
- Line length: 7 km (4.3 mi)
- Track gauge: 1,435 mm (4 ft 8 1/2 in) standard gauge
- Maximum incline: 2.78%

The Brügge–Lüdenscheid railway is a single-track, non-electrified branch line in the German state of North Rhine-Westphalia. The 7 km-long (4.3 mi) line climbs from Lüdenscheid-Brügge station on the Hagen–Dieringhausen railway to Lüdenscheid station.

== History ==
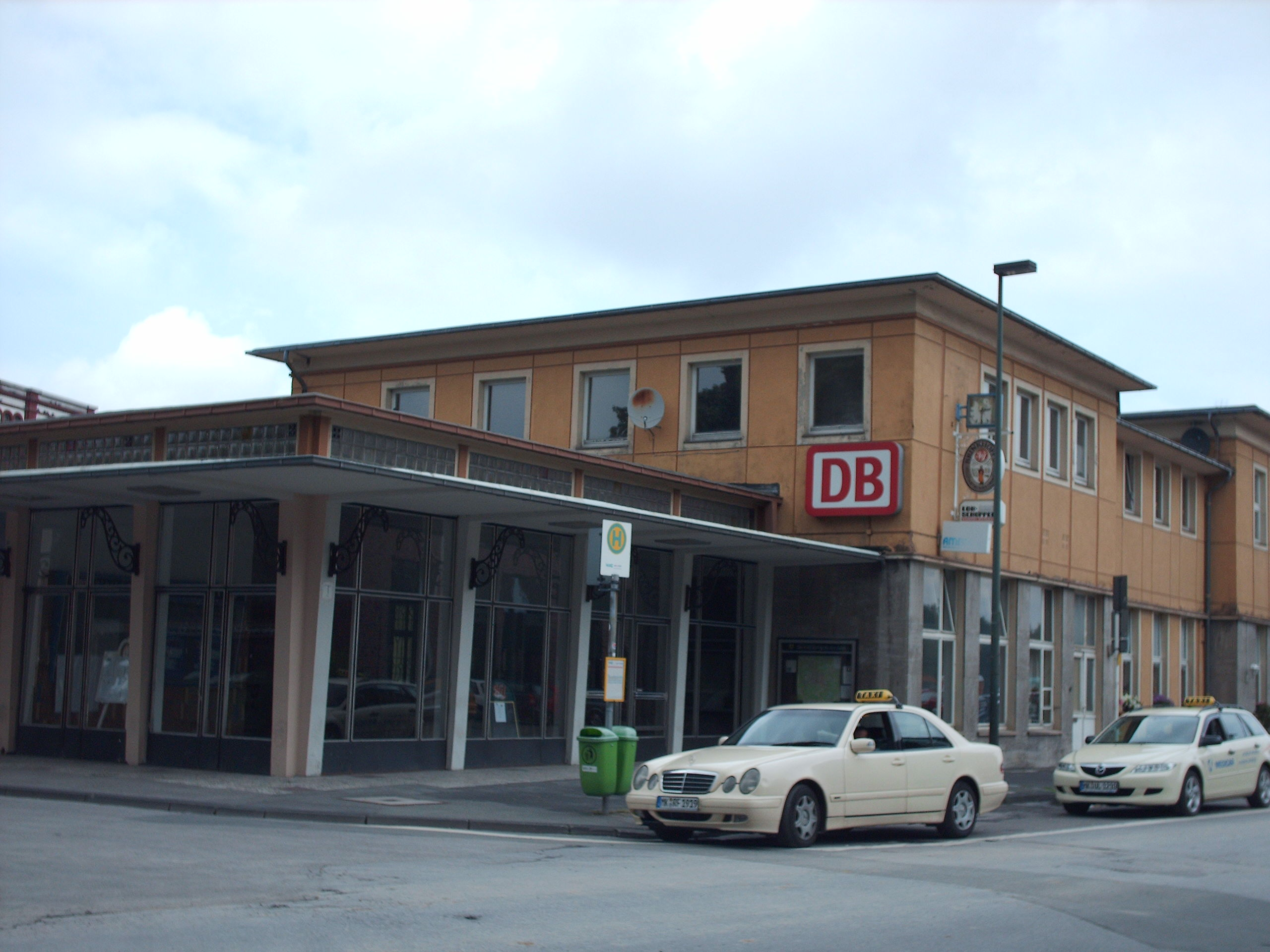
The old Lüdenscheid station building before demolition in 2009

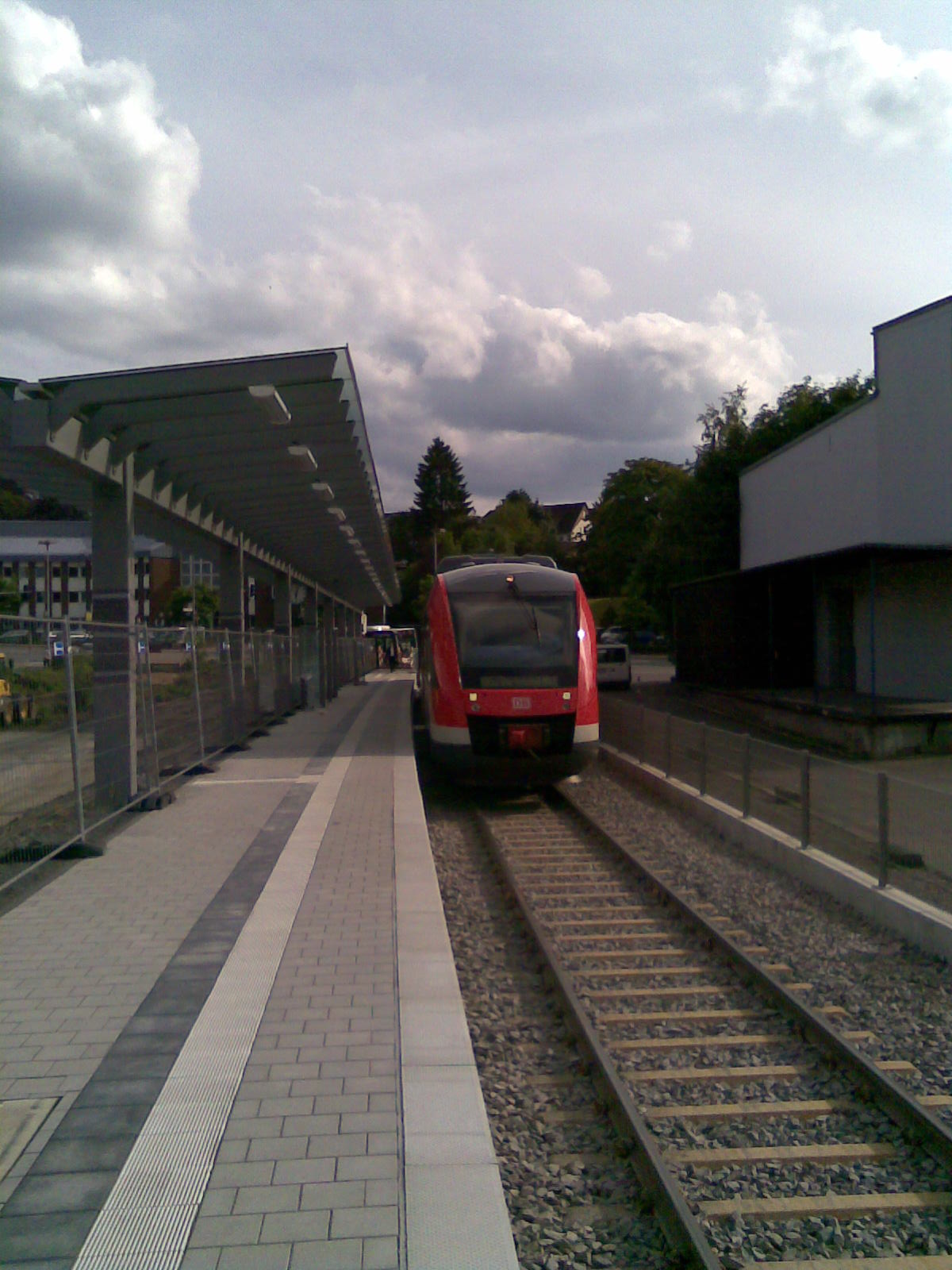
Lüdenscheid station (June 2009)

Brügge gained a rail connection in 1874 with the opening of the Dahl–Brügge section of the Hagen–Dieringhausen railway (also called the Volmetalbahn: "Volme Valley Railway"). Lüdenscheid sought a connection to this line, but the design of a line to serve it was far from easy because of the difficult topography. Despite a maximum grade of 1:36, a 412 m-long (1,352 ft) tunnel had to be built near Lüdenscheid.

The 6.5 km-long (4.0 mi) line was opened on 15 July 1880 by the Prussian state railways. From 1904, there was a transfer point at Wehberg station to the Altena District Railway (Kreis Altenaer Eisenbahn, KAE), which operated until 1967. However, it was used only for freight. For passenger transport, there was a stairway between the District Railway station and the state railway station, which was 18 metres higher.

At the beginning of the 20th century there were plans to connect the Hagen–Dieringhausen railway with the Plettenberg–Herscheid railway, thus creating a connection between the Volme and Lenne valleys. However, during the First World War work was abandoned due to the high construction costs, although the earthworks had already been built through Herscheid. In the 1920s, the municipality of Herscheid tried to revive this project, but it was abandoned with the onset of hyperinflation. Later, road transport became dominant in Germany. The section would have been about 33.9 km long. The mountainous topography in Sauerland meant that the plans included large tunnels, bridges and underpasses, such as on the ridge between the Verse and the Ahe valleys, where a 650-metre-long (2,130 ft)-tunnel was planned. Another 300-metre-long (980 ft) tunnel would have run in Herscheid from Helle to below the shooting range. A total of four tunnels were planned with a total length of 2,175 metres (7,136 ft). The estimated cost for the tunnels amounted to 1.84 million marks. The total cost of the railway line was estimated by the Prussian state railways to be 9.8 million marks or 289,100 marks per kilometre of line.

Due to its steepness, three class 96 locomotives were stationed at the Brügge depot (Bw Brügge) for use on the line in the 1930s.

From 1965 to September 1994 the Brügge–Lüdenscheid line and the Volme Valley Railway was served by push-pull trains consisting of class 212 diesel locomotives (stationed in Hagen) and two or three, mainly Silberling, carriages. Until 1979 there was also a railbus shuttle between Lüdenscheid station and Brügge station, connecting with the express trains between Cologne and Hagen. A class 628.4 diesel railcar operated on the line from September 1994 to 30 May 1999.

== Current situation ==
Today the line is served hourly by the Regionalbahn line RB 52 (Volmetal-Bahn), which runs from Dortmund to Lüdenscheid via Herdecke, Hagen and Schalksmühle, and the RB 25 (Oberbergische Bahn), which runs from Köln Hansaring to Lüdenscheid via Cologne.

In addition, since the late 1990s a proposal has been under consideration to build a station at Lüdenscheider Kreishaus to serve the large surrounding population. However, because of the problems of the location (a site in a deep cutting or possibly with underground platforms), it would have very high costs. Therefore, investigations have focused on the relocation of Lüdenscheid station and the project is being pursued no further for the time being.

By 2010, work commenced on the reconstruction of Lüdenscheid station. First the disused buildings were demolished and contaminated land was remediated. An improved rail/bus interchange is also part of the development program. A single track was laid on the northwestern edge of the station precinct along the existing street of Bahnhofallee and further up on the slope old Protestant cemetery. The new platform was put into operation on 8 June 2009.

A plan presented in 1997 for a Hagen Regionalstadtbahn (Regionalstadtbahn Hagen), which included the Volme Valley Railway from Dortmund via Hagen to Lüdenscheid as a light rail to operate directly from Dortmund city centre via Hagen city centre to central Lüdenscheid, was rejected for cost reasons, despite its traffic-related benefits.

A direct rail service from 2015 Lüdenscheid to Cologne (RB25, the Oberbergische Bahn) was reopened in 2015. Lüdenscheid-Brügge station has become a transportation hub.
