= Dortmund-Löttringhausen station =

Railway station in Dortmund, Germany

Dortmund Löttringhausen
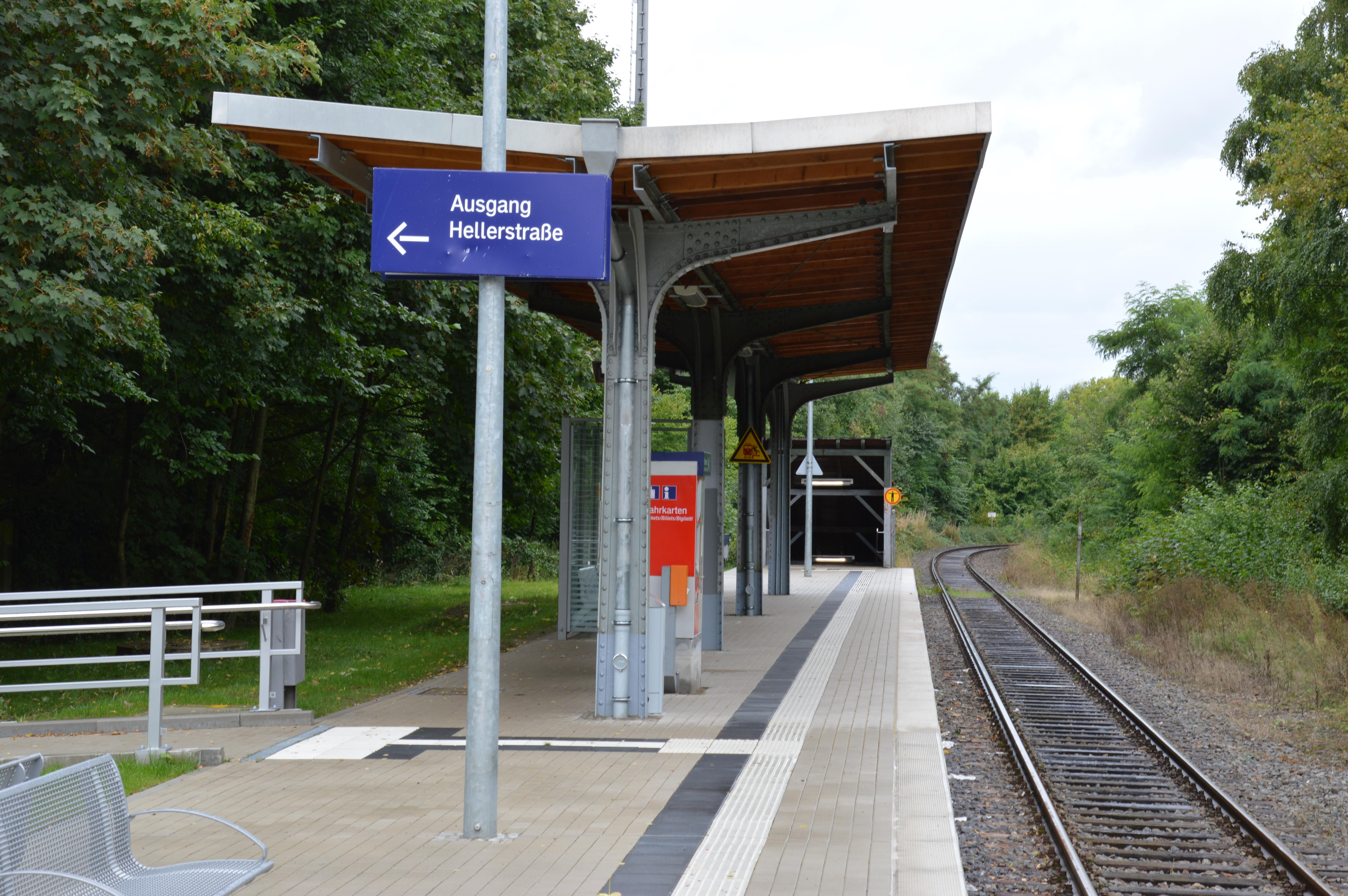

General information
- Location: Hellerstr. Dortmund-Löttringhausen, NRW; Germany
- Coordinates: 51°27′6″N 7°26′50″E
- Owner: DB Netz
- Operator: DB Station&Service
- Lines: Düsseldorf-Derendorf–Dortmund Süd; Dortmund–Bochum
- Platforms: 1

Construction
- Accessible: Yes

Other information
- Station code: 1316
- DS100 code: EDLH
- IBNR: 8001538
- Category: 6
- Fare zone: VRR: 372
- Website: www.bahnhof.de

History
- Opened: 15 May 1879

Services
Preceding station	DB Regio NRW	Following station
Dortmund-Kirchhörde towards Dortmund Hbf	RB 52	Wittbräucke towards Lüdenscheid
Location

Dortmund-Löttringhausen station is on the former Rhenish Railway Company in the suburb of Löttringhausen in the Dortmund district of Hombruch in the German state of North Rhine-Westphalia.

== General ==
The station is located on the former Düsseldorf-Derendorf–Dortmund Süd railway opened by the Rhenish Railway Company (Rheinischen Eisenbahn-Gesellschaft) between 1873 and 1879. Dortmund-Löttringhausen station was also the terminus of former Dortmund-Löttringhausen–Bochum-Langendreer railway, the so-called Rheinischer Esel ("Rhenish ass"), which opened in 1880. Löttringhausen station was built to serve the nearby, economically important Gottessegen coal mine. Shortly south of Löttringhausen station is the Ender Tunnel, where the railway crosses the Ardey Hills.

== Current condition ==
Today only one two-way track is operational. The remains of the old station (old platform, a row of trees, old station sign, etc.) are still visible. On an adjoining property there are only remnants of the former roundhouse in the form of rubble. An extensive renovation of the station was completed in May 2013.

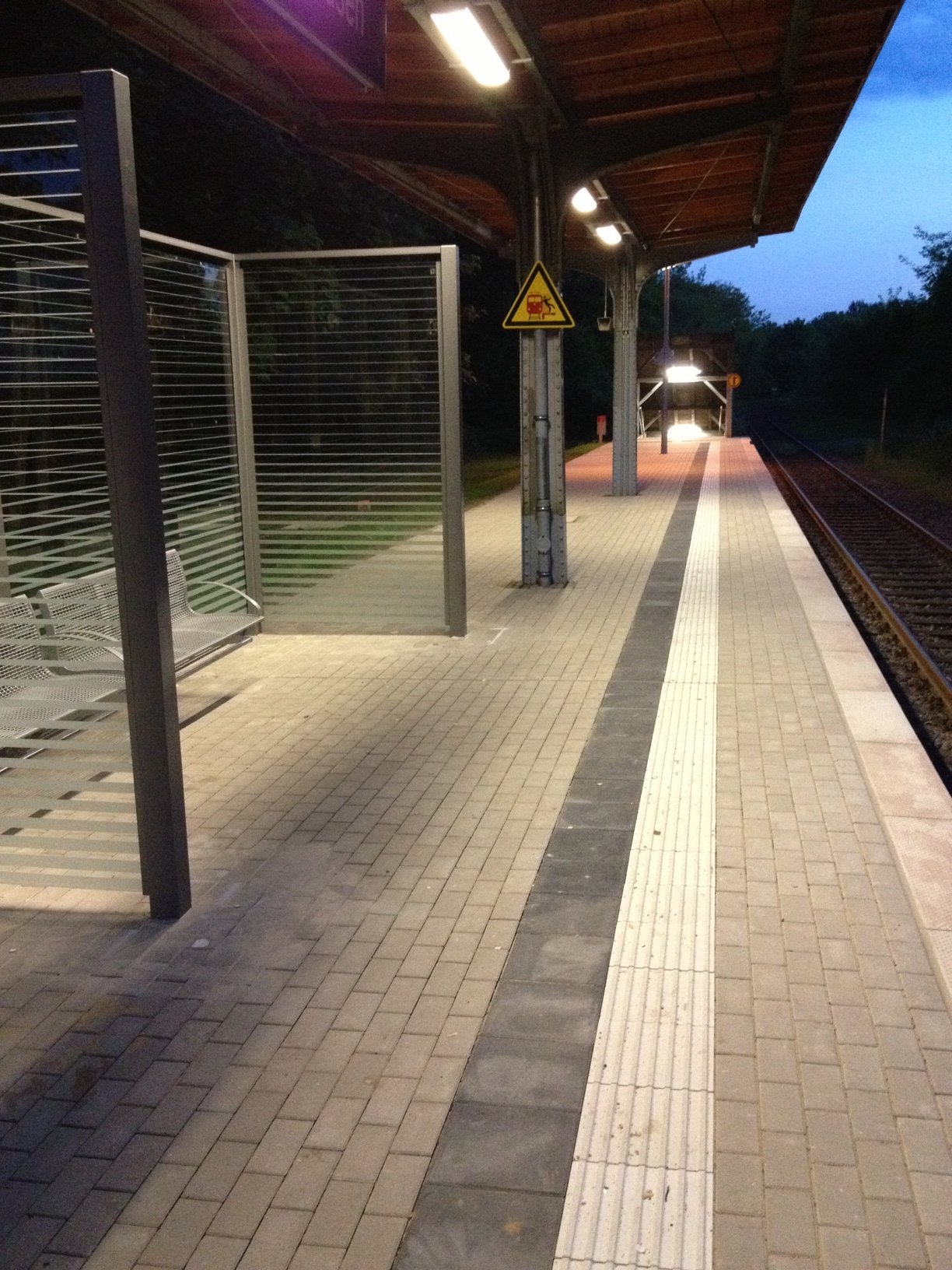
Dortmund-Löttringhausen after renovation

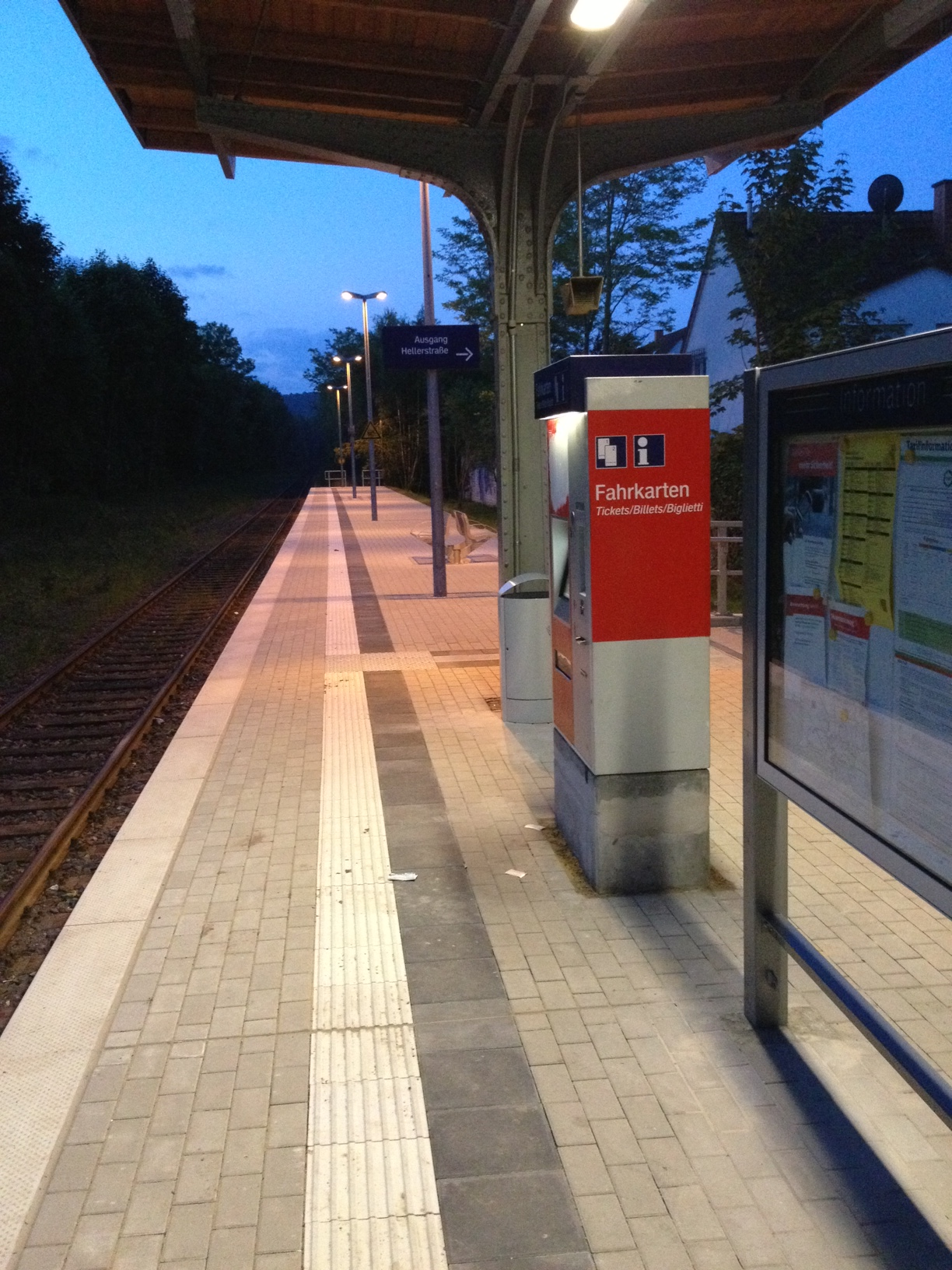
Dortmund-Löttringhausen after renovation

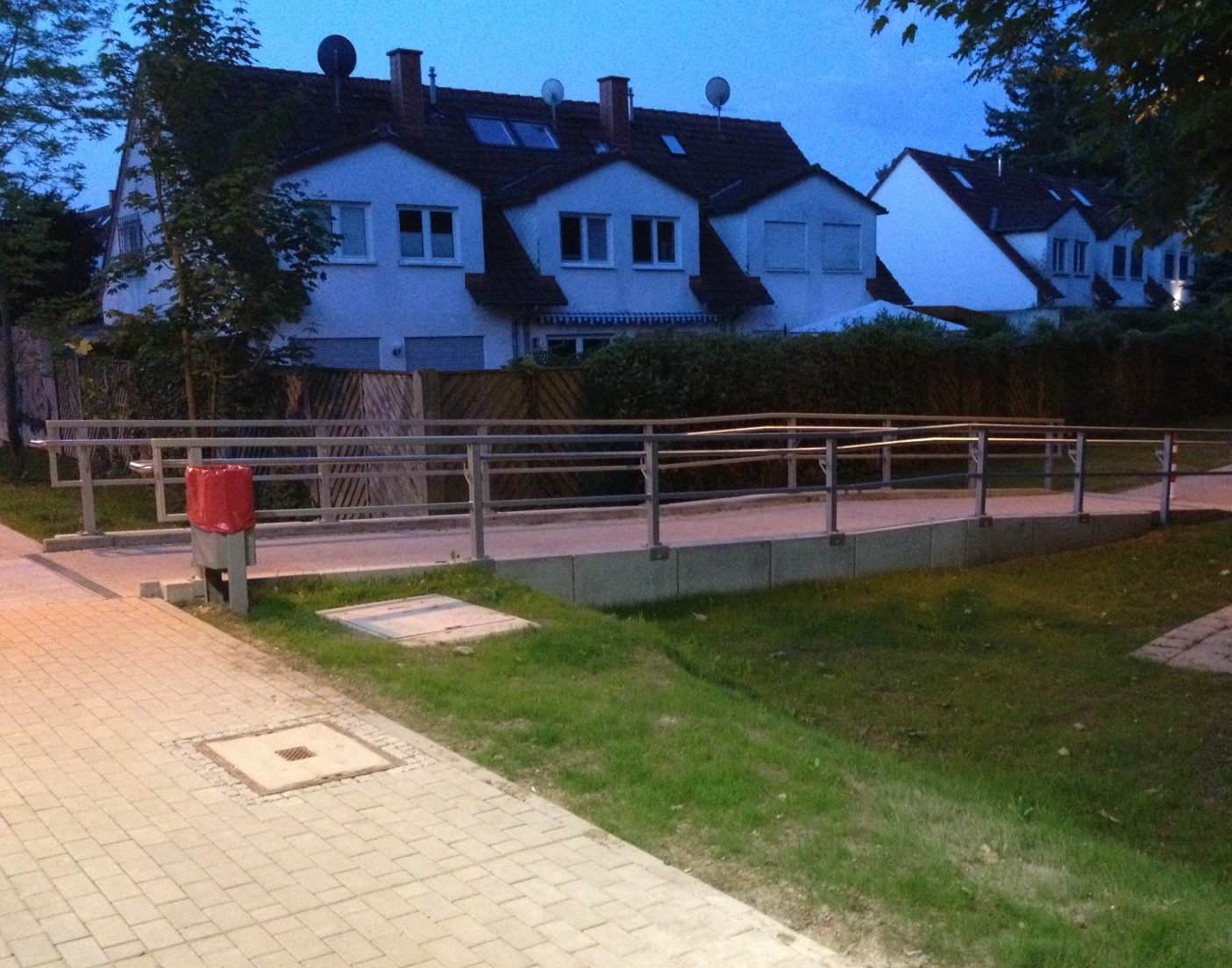
Dortmund-Löttringhausen after renovation

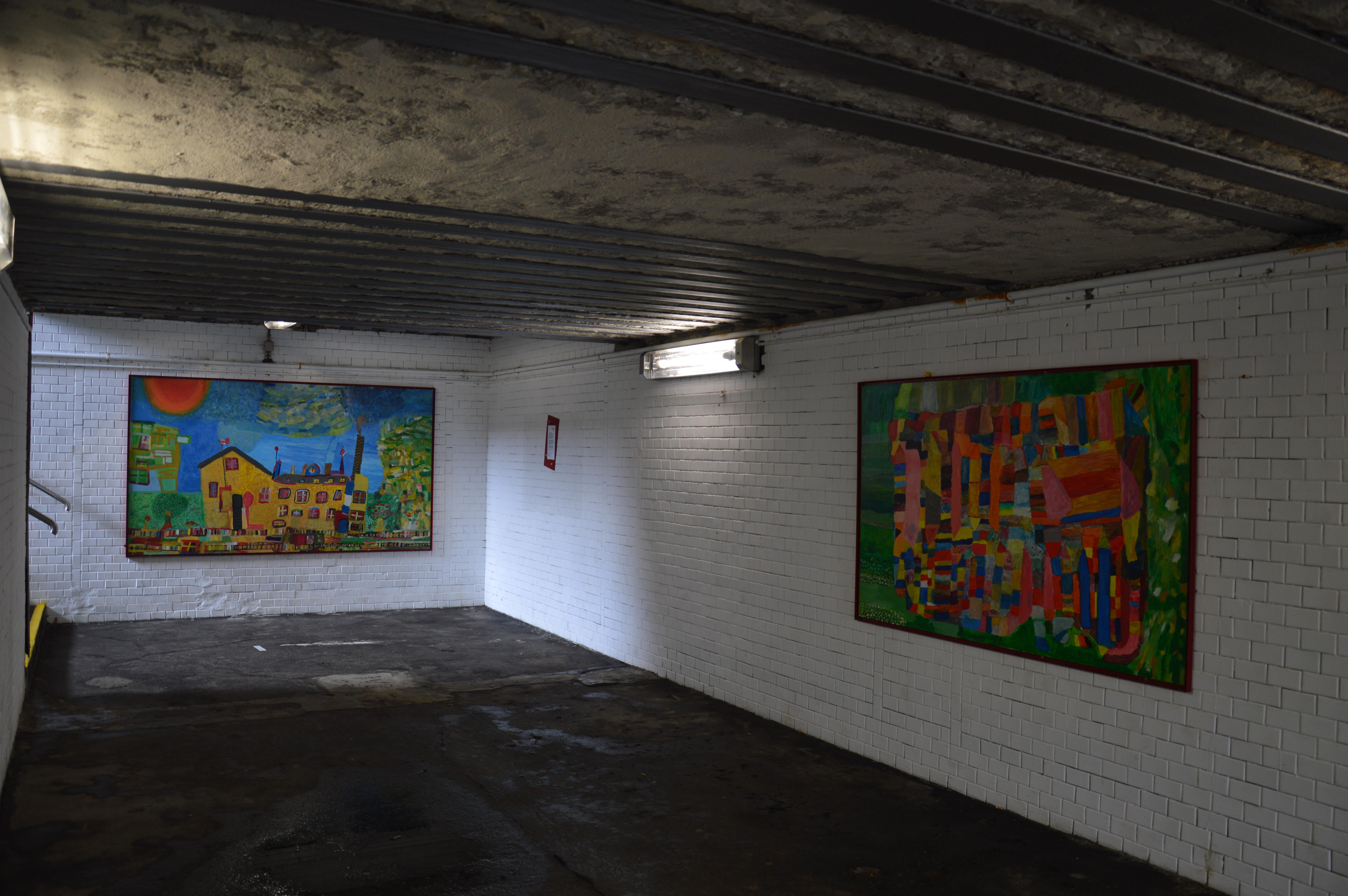
Murals of the neighbouring Gottessegen workshop

== Services ==
The station is currently served by one Regionalbahn line:

Line	Line name	Route	Frequency
RB 52	Volmetal-Bahn	Dortmund Hbf – Dortmund-Löttringhausen – Hagen – Schalksmühle – Brügge – Lüdenscheid	Hourly

The station is served by bus line 448 to Witten-Rüdinghausen via Dortmund-Barop.
