= Dortmund-Kirchhörde station =

Railway station in Dortmund, Germany

Dortmund Kirchhörde
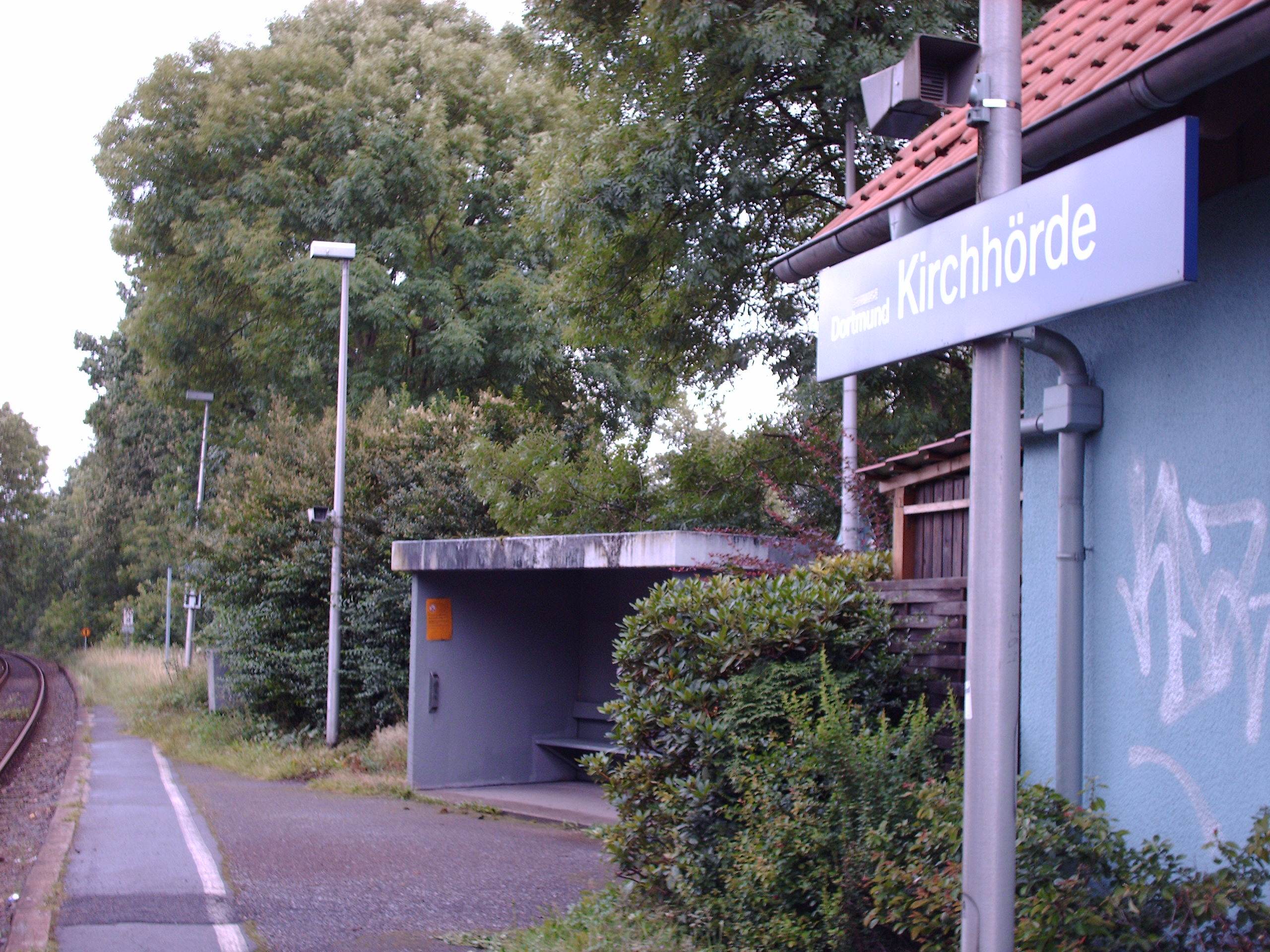
- 2007

General information
- Location: Hagener Straße 197; 44229 Dortmund; NRW, Germany
- Coordinates: 51.4642°N 7.4578°E
- Owner: DB Netz
- Operator: DB Station&Service
- Line: Düsseldorf-Derendorf–Dortmund Süd
- Platforms: 1 side platform
- Tracks: 1
- Train operators: DB Regio NRW

Construction
- Accessible: No

Other information
- Station code: 1310
- DS100 code: EDKH
- IBNR: 8001534
- Category: 6
- Fare zone: VRR: 372
- Website: www.bahnhof.de

Services
Preceding station	DB Regio NRW	Following station
Dortmund Tierpark towards Dortmund Hbf	RB 52	Dortmund-Löttringhausen towards Lüdenscheid
Location
- Location within North Rhine-Westphalia

Dortmund-Kirchhörde station is a railway station in the Kirchhörde district of the town of Dortmund, located in North Rhine-Westphalia, Germany.

== Rail services ==
Line	Name	Route
RB 52	Volmetalbahn	Dortmund – Dortmund-Kirchhörde – Hagen – Lüdenscheid
