= Schalksmühle station =

Railway station in Schalksmühle, Germany

Schalksmühle
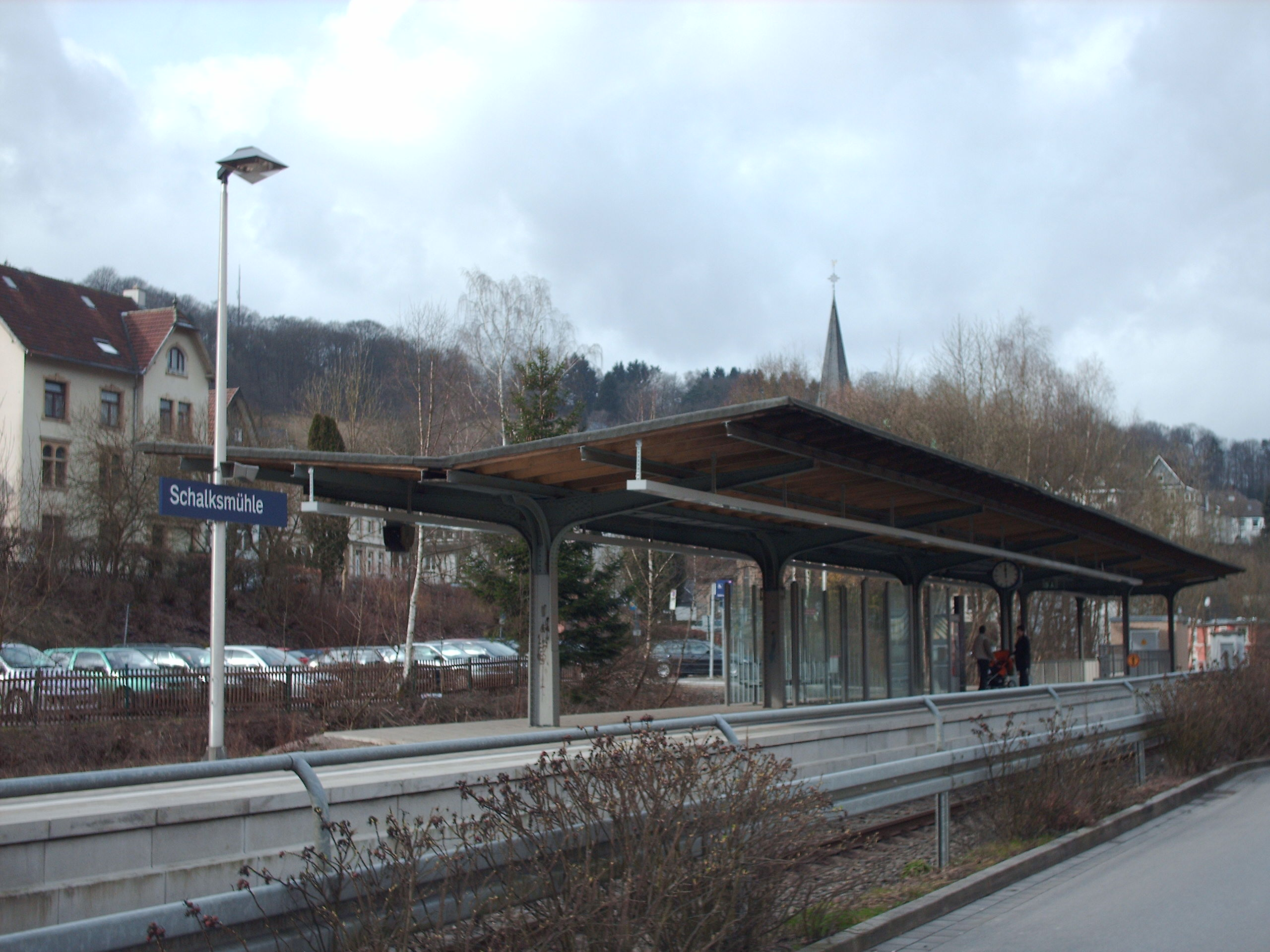

General information
- Location: Worthstr./Bahnhofsstr. Schalksmühle, North Rhine-Westphalia; Germany
- Coordinates: 51°14′26″N 7°31′58″E
- System: Through station
- Line: Hagen–Dieringhausen railway (KBS 434, 459)
- Platforms: 1

Other information
- Station code: 5537
- DS100 code: ESMU
- IBNR: 8005316
- Category: 6
- Fare zone: Westfalentarif: 48021
- Website: www.bahnhof.de

History
- Opened: 6 September 1874

Services
Preceding station	DB Regio NRW	Following station
Dahlerbrück towards Dortmund Hbf	RB 52	Brügge (Westf) towards Lüdenscheid
Location
- Location within North Rhine-Westphalia

Schalksmühle station is in the town of Schalksmühle in the German state of North Rhine-Westphalia. It is on the Hagen–Dieringhausen railway (also called the Volmetalbahn: Volme Valley Railway) and it is classified by Deutsche Bahn as a category 6 station.

The station is on the edge of central Schalksmühle. The only platform connects to the station forecourt and is at ground level. It was recently planned to restore the line to two tracks to allow services on the line to run at 30-minute intervals. This has not been carried out, but reduplication is still possible if needed.

== History ==
Schalksmühle KAE station, which was opposite the state station, was the starting point of the Hälver Valley Railway (Hälvertalbahn) to Halver. Thus connections could be made between the Hälver Valley Railway and the Volme Valley Railway. Schalksmühle station became important for both freight and passenger transport. Schalksmühle station and the two railway lines contributed significantly to its economic success. Even today there are many companies in Schalksmühle that are located on the course of the Hälver Valley Railway and the Volme Valley Railway. The Schnurrenweg, which begins next to the station, now marks the course of the former Hälver Valley Railway to Halver.

The station was modernised in 2006 at a cost of €900,000; this included the raising of the platform height to 76 cm to give level access to trains.

== Station area ==
The site of the former station is now the location of a Kaufpark supermarket and a kiosk and postal agency. These are connected via a passage to the platform. The Rathausplatz (town hall square) and central Schalksmühle can be reached within a few minutes across the street of Am Bahnhof ("at the station") and down some stairs.

Schalksmühle station is playing a central role as part of Regionale 2013, a set of development projects in the region of southern Westphalia. It is planned to improve connections between the residential area that is located above the railway station to the town center via the railway station. A bridge is proposed that leads from the residential area, across the platform, the Rathausplatz and the underlying parking garage. Schnurrenplatz would also be built next to the platform. The connection from the bridge is to be provided by three sets of steps and three lifts. The building of a bicycle station for 150 bicycles, which would also allow for the repair and rental of bicycles, by 2016 is also being considered. These measures would reduce the separation of the urban areas.

== Services ==
The station is currently served by one Regionalbahn line:

Line	Line name	Route	Frequency
RB 52	Volmetal-Bahn	Dortmund Hbf – Dortmund-Löttringhausen – Hagen – Schalksmühle – Brügge (Westf) – Lüdenscheid	Hourly
