= Lüdenscheid-Brügge station =

Railway station in Lüdenscheid, Germany

Lüdenscheid-Brügge
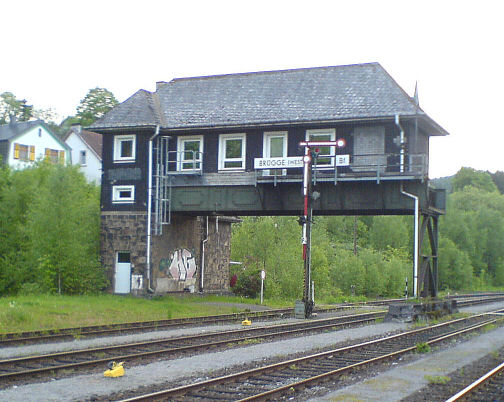
- Brügge signal box

General information
- Location: Lüdenscheid, North Rhine-Westphalia; Germany
- Coordinates: 51°12′30″N 7°34′16″E
- System: Separation station
- Owner: Deutsche Bahn
- Operator: DB Netz; DB Station&Service
- Lines: Volme Valley Railway (KBS 434, 459); Brügge–Lüdenscheid (KBS 434)
- Platforms: 2

Construction
- Accessible: Yes

Other information
- Station code: 915
- DS100 code: EBRU
- IBNR: 8001213
- Category: 7
- Fare zone: Westfalentarif: 48571
- Website: www.bahnhof.de

History
- Opened: 6 September 1874

Services
Preceding station	DB Regio NRW	Following station
Oberbrügge towards Köln Hansaring	RB 25	Lüdenscheid Terminus
Schalksmühle towards Dortmund Hbf	RB 52	Lüdenscheid Terminus
Location
- Location within North Rhine-Westphalia Location within Germany Location within Europe

Lüdenscheid-Brügge station is on the Hagen–Dieringhausen railway from Hagen Hauptbahnhof to Dieringhausen station in the German state of North Rhine-Westphalia. It is classified by Deutsche Bahn as a category 7 station. Because of the branch line to Lüdenscheid, it is classified as a separation station. The station is located on the edge of the Lüdenscheid hamlet of Brügge. There is an island platform with tracks which connects with the bus stop at ground level. The station is known nationally for its elevated disused but preserved signalbox. The station was called Brügge (Westfalen) until 10 December 2017.

== History ==
The Hagen–Dieringhausen railway (also called the Volmetalbahn: “Volme Valley Railway”) from Hagen was opened to Dieringhausen in stages between 1871 and 1893. Numerous apartments for the railwaymen were built around the station area because Brügge was a busy station and many residents were employed in the station’s operation. During this period the signalbox, a roundhouse with a turntable and a water tower were built on the site. Until 1986, there was a direct passenger service to Cologne. In 2009, the former Art Nouveau style station building was demolished because it was in danger of collapse as there had been no restoration to the old building in recent years. The old platform area of Brügge station with the platforms for the line to Dieringhausen and Cologne which were connected via an underground passage to the station forecourt had been removed by 2016. The station was renamed Lüdenscheid-Brügge on 10 December 2017.

== Today ==
The freight operations in Brügge is limited to the line from Krummenerl, which is used by freight trains from the local quarry, which continue on the Volme Valley Railway through Brügge to the north. In 2016 the station was completed rebuild with new track layout and installation of an electronic signal box. There is now a "tongue" platform between two platform tracks, one of which terminates, so it is easily accessible. In December 2017, services on the Volme Valley Railway were extended from Meinerzhagen to Brügge. The facade and roof of the old signal box at Brügge station, which dates back to 1927 have been renovated.

== Rail services ==
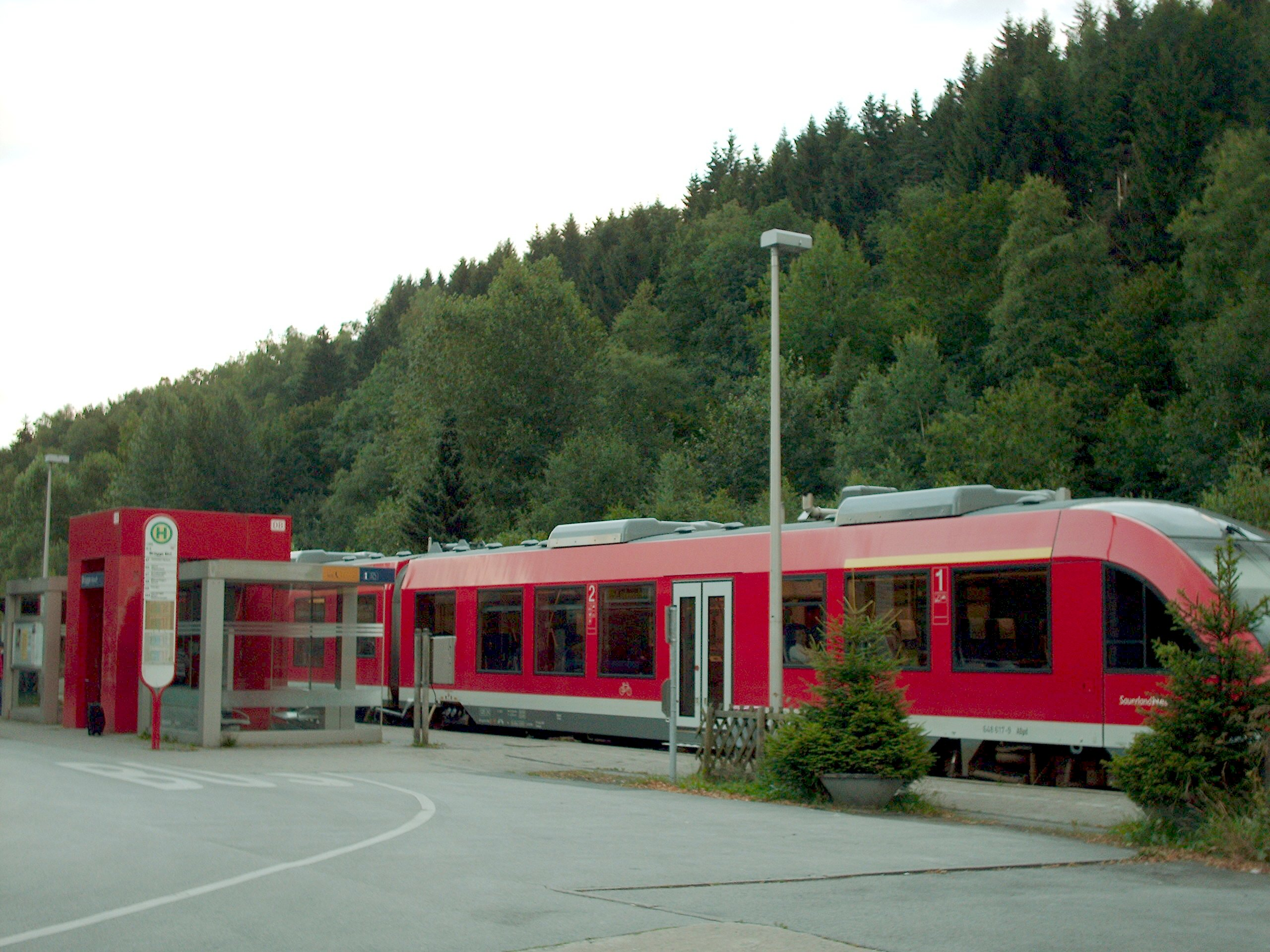
RB 52 service in Brügge

The station is served by two Regionalbahn lines:

Line	Route	Frequency
RB 52 Volmetal-Bahn	Lüdenscheid – Lüdenscheid-Brügge – Schalksmühle – Hagen – Dortmund	Hourly
RB 25 Oberbergische Bahn	Köln Hansaring – Cologne Hbf – Köln Messe/Deutz – Overath – Engelskirchen – Dieringhausen – Gummersbach – Meinerzhagen – Lüdenscheid-Brügge – Lüdenscheid	hourly/bihourly

The RB52 trains reverse at the station.

== Bus services ==
Bus services are operated by Märkische Verkehrsgesellschaft (Märkische Transport Company, MVG) and Busverkehr Ruhr-Sieg (Ruhr-Sieg Bus Transport, BRS) over the following seven bus lines:

Line	Route	Frequency (mins) (Mon–Fri)	Frequency (mins) (Sat)	Frequency (mins) (Sun)
47	Lüdenscheid, Eichholz – Lüdenscheid, Sauerfeld central bus station – Lüdenscheid, Bahnhof – Lüdenscheid, Brügge station – Halver, Ostendorf Schule	30 / 60	30 / 60	60
55	Lüdenscheid, Kulturhaus – Lüdenscheid, Sauerfeld central bus station – Lüdenscheid, Talstraße – Lüdenscheid, Brügge station – Halver, Sparkasse central bus station – Wipperfürth bus station	Irregular	No service	No service
56	Lüdenscheid, Ahelle – Lüdenscheid, Brügge station – Halver, Ostendorf school – Lüdenscheid, Brügge school – Lüdenscheid, Wehberg Wendestelle	Irregular	No service	No service
57	Lüdenscheid, Brügge station – Schalksmühle, Strücken – Schalksmühle, Rathausplatz – Schalksmühle, Mitte – Schalksmühle, Dahlerbrück – Hagen, Rummenohl Mitte	Irregular	No service	No service
58	Lüdenscheid, Kulturhaus – Lüdenscheid, Sauerfeld central bus station – Lüdenscheid, Talstraße – Lüdenscheid, Brügge station – Kierspe central bus station– Meinerzhagen station / central bus station	60	60	60
59	Lüdenscheid, Kulturhaus – Lüdenscheid, Sauerfeld central bus station – Lüdenscheid, Talstraße – Lüdenscheid, Brügge station – Kierspe central bus station – Kierspe, Feuerwehrgerätehaus	60	No service	No service
134	Lüdenscheid, Kulturhaus – Lüdenscheid, Sauerfeld central bus station – Lüdenscheid station– Lüdenscheid, Brügge station – Halver, Sparkasse central bus station – Radevormwald bus station	30 / 60	60	60
