= Hagen–Dieringhausen railway =

Railway line in Germany

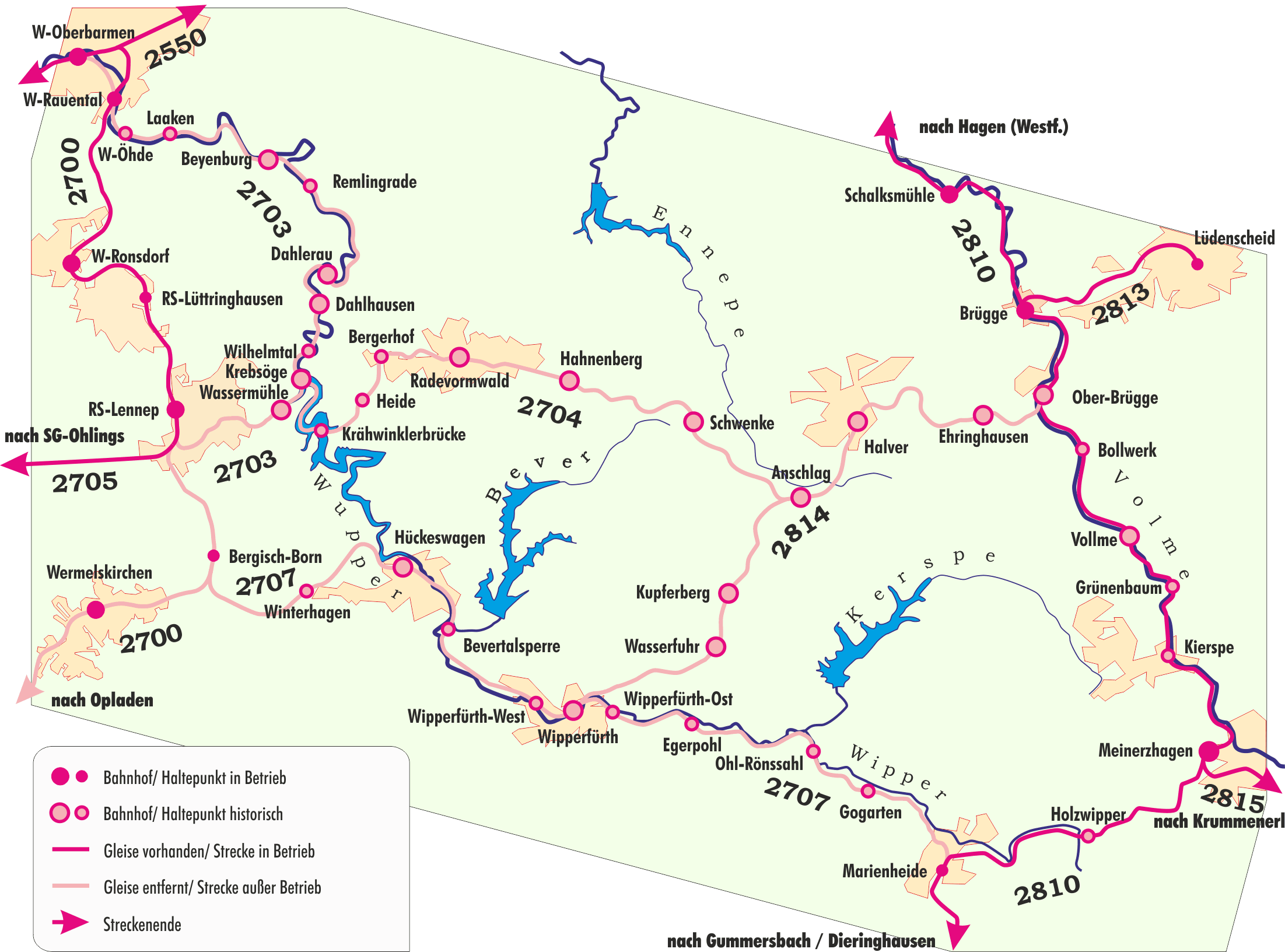
- Map of the Oberbergish railways

Overview
- Line number: 2819 (Hagen–Oberhagen); 2817 (Hagen–Rehsiepen); 810 (Oberhagen–Dieringhausen); 2813 (Brügge–Lüdenscheid)
- Locale: North Rhine-Westphalia, Germany

Service
- Route number: 434

Technical
- Line length: 61 km (38 mi)
- Number of tracks: 2: Hagen–Hagen-Delstern
- Track gauge: 1,435 mm (4 ft 8 1/2 in) standard gauge
- Operating speed: 90 km/h (55.9 mph) (maximum)

The Hagen–Dieringhausen railway (also called the Volmetalbahn: Volme Valley Railway) is a mostly single-track (continuously double track as far as Lüdenscheid-Brügge) and non-electrified railway line from Hagen Hauptbahnhof via Lüdenscheid-Brügge, Meinerzhagen and Gummersbach to Gummersbach-Dieringhausen in the German state of North Rhine-Westphalia.

The Volmetalbahn is also the name of the trains running on this line as Regionalbahn service RB 52, from Lüdenscheid via Hagen to Dortmund. The RB 25 (Oberbergische Bahn) service runs from Lüdenscheid via Lüdenscheid-Brügge and Marienheide to Cologne on the line.

The railway and the Regionalbahn service are both named after the Volme river, which they both follow for most of their route.

== History ==
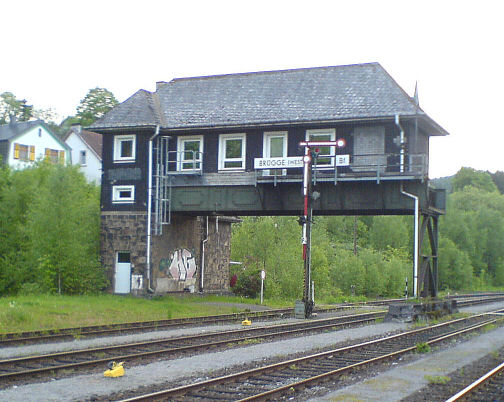
Elevated signalbox in Lüdenscheid-Brügge

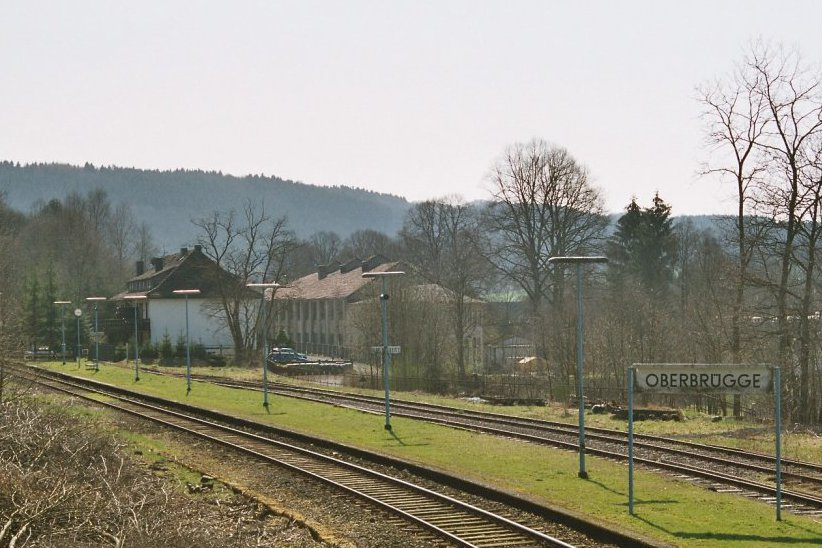
The former closed station at Halver-Oberbrügge with passing loop until 2012 (reopened in 2019)

The route was studied in the 1840s as an alternative to the route of the Ruhr–Sieg railway. In May 1870, the Bergisch-Märkische Railway Company (Bergisch-Märkischen Eisenbahn-Gesellschaft, BME) began construction of the Volme Valley Railway. The route was opened from Hagen to Oberhagen on 16 October 1871 and the line was extended to Dahl for freight traffic on 15 March 1874. On 6 September 1874 this section was released for passenger services. After the nationalisation of the BME, the Volme Valley Railway was extended to Brügge via Meinerzhagen towards Marienheide and Gummersbach in 1891/92. The entire route was completed to Dieringhausen in 1893. Construction of an extension via Krummenerl for connection to the Finnentrop–Freudenberg railway (Bigge Valley Railway) and on to Kreuztal was started several times, but not completed. Construction stopped at Krummenerl in 1927.

In Hagen, the line initially ran through the city (along the present-day Bergstraße). Because of the significant difficulties experienced by road users, construction of a bypass was started in November 1906. As a result, the Goldberg tunnel was put into operation on 1 July 1910. During the duplication of the line in 1906 the Kotthausen Tunnel and the Hammerhausen Tunnel were removed.

At the beginning of the 20th century there were plans to connect the Volme Valley Railway with the Plettenberg–Herscheid railway, to create a connection between the Volme and Lenne valleys. However, this plan failed due to high construction costs.

Until 1958, freight was transferred in Marienheide to the metre gauge Leppe Valley Railway (Leppetalbahn).

On the route between Hagen and Brügge there are three disused railway stations. The stations of Delstern and Ambrock were between Oberhagen and Dahl. There was once was a station at Breckerfeld-Priorei between Dahl and Rummenohl. Delstern and Breckerfeld-Priorei stations closed on 27 May 1979, while Ambrock closed in 1964 or 1965.

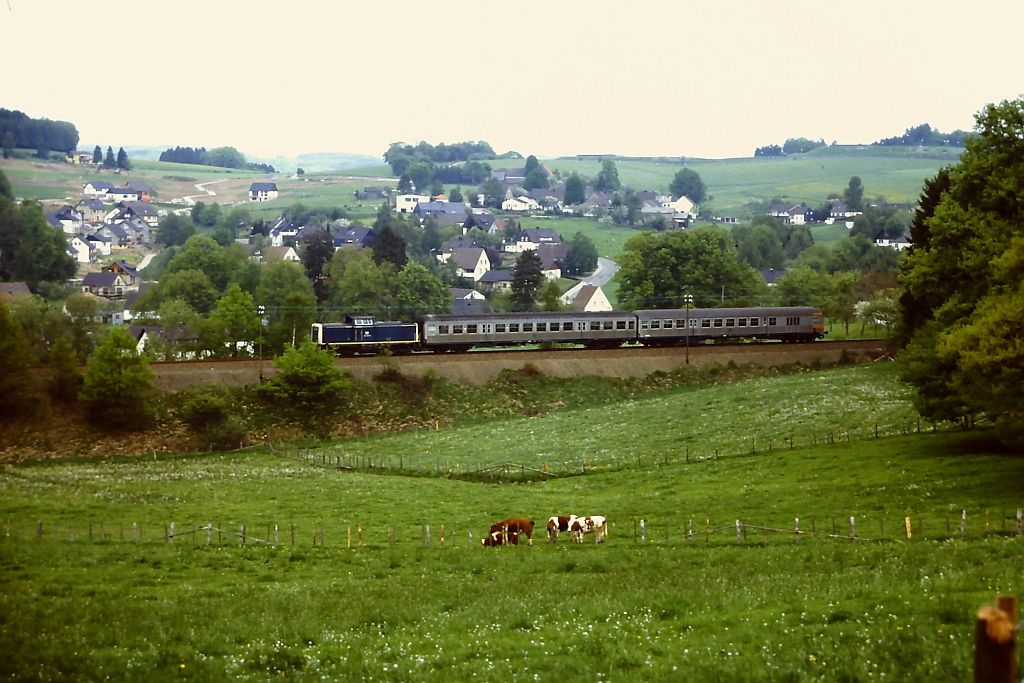
DB 212 312-3 with N6367 on 23 May 1986 at the exit from Marienheide towards Meinerzhagen

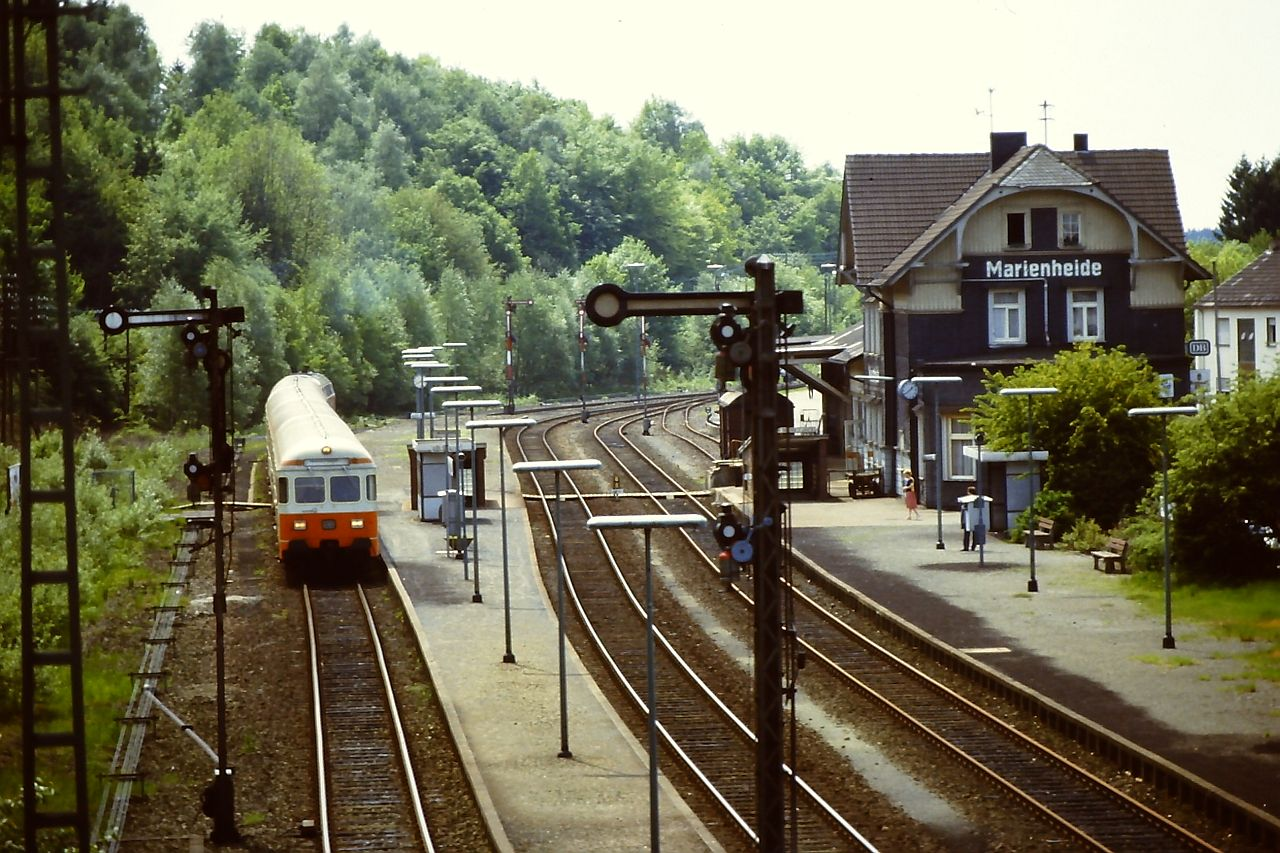
Marienheide station in 1986 with a City-Bahn service

From 1965 until September 1994, the Volme Valley Railway was operated with push–pull trains consisting of Hagen-based class 212 diesel locomotives with two to three, mostly Silberling, carriages. Until 1979 there was also a Deutsche Bundesbahn bus shuttle between Lüdenscheid and Brügge, which connected with the express trains between Cologne and Hagen. A class 628.4 diesel multiple unit operated from September 1994 to 30 May 1999. City-Bahn services operated on the (Cologne–) Dieringhausen–Meinerzhagen section (cut back in 1986 to Marienheide and in 1987 to Gummersbach) from 1984 to 1995.

Operations of the Volme Valley Railway was put to tender in 1996; it was the first railway line in Germany to be put to European-wide tender. This was won by the Dortmund-Märkische Eisenbahn (DME), a company mainly owned by the City of Dortmund. It took over operations of the Hagen-Brügge-Lüdenscheid route on 30 May 1999 and operated Bombardier Talent DMUs. In 2004, the route was retendered and won by Deutsche Bahn, which has operated it with Alstom Coradia LINT 41 (class 648) railcars.

During the first period of tendered operations the single track section between Brügge and Hagen-Delstern was rebuilt in order to accelerate it. However, this accelerated operations only minimally, as various passing tracks had been dismantled and timetabling was restricted. Gravel trains that still regularly running from Meinerzhagen and empty trains running in the opposite direction must stop regularly in Brügge or Delstern. Passenger trains may be delayed in reaching their scheduled crossings in Rummenohl, leading to further delays, which cancel out the intended acceleration.

A plan presented in 1997 for a Hagen Regionalstadtbahn (Regionalstadtbahn Hagen), which included the Volme Valley Railway from Dortmund via Hagen to Lüdenscheid as a light rail to operate directly from Dortmund city centre via Hagen city centre to central Lüdenscheid, was rejected for cost reasons, despite its traffic-related benefits.

== Current condition ==
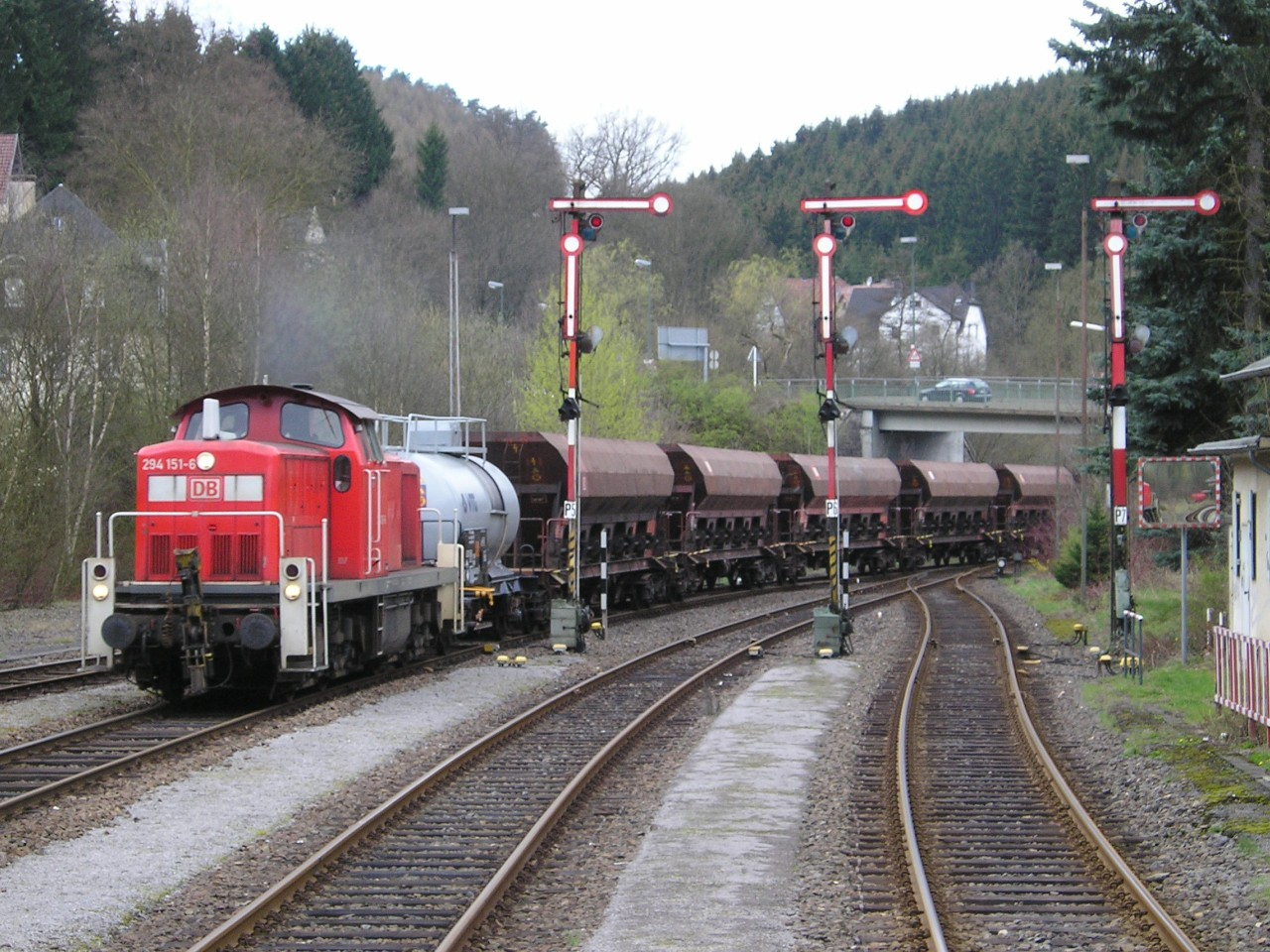
Shunting locomotive 294 151-6 hauling a front train towards Hagen in Lüdenscheid-Brügge station

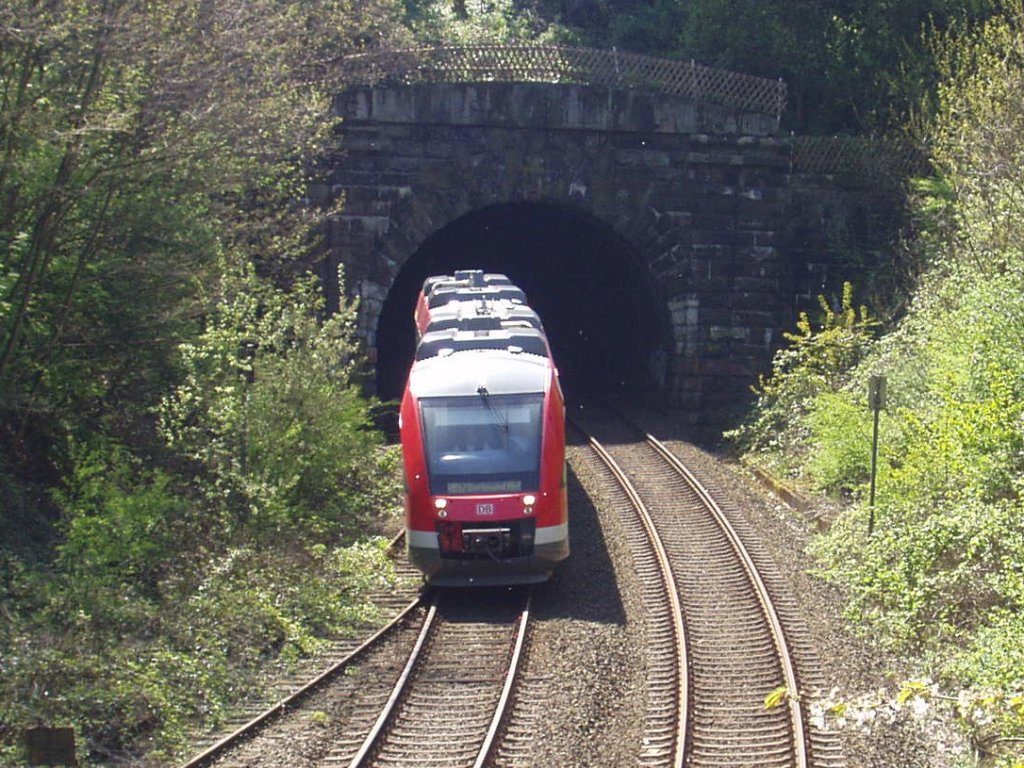
The Volmetal-Bahn service leaving the Goldberg Tunnel in Hagen

The Volme Valley Railway, including the 2,200 m-long Goldberg tunnel in Hagen, is a major piece of railway infrastructure.

Since 2006, just two signal boxes remain at Gummersbacher station, with one of them serving a local savings bank as a training centre. All other signal boxes have now been now demolished or are disused.

== Rail services ==
The Volme Valley Railway is served hourly (with gaps on Sunday mornings) by Regionalbahn service RB 52 (Volmetal-Bahn). It starts in Dortmund Hauptbahnhof and runs via Hagen Hbf and Brügge (where it reverses) to Lüdenscheid. The trains cross just before the half-hour in Rummenohl. Since 12 December 2004 services on the Volme Valley Railway have been operated by DB Regio NRW using DB Class 648 (LINT 41) diesel railcars, which are capable of speeds of up to 120 km/h, although the line allow a maximum of 90 km/h. Occasionally, rollingstock of classes 612, 628.4 and 640 (LINT 27) is used.

The line from Gummersbach-Dieringhausen via Lüdenscheid-Brügge to Lüdenscheid is served by Alstom Coradia LINT 81 multiple units, operating as RB 25 (Oberbergische Bahn) from Cologne, and reaching the Volme Valley Railway in Dieringhausen over the Siegburg–Olpe railway.
