= Oberbergische Bahn =

RB 25 Oberbergische Bahn

Overview
- Line number: 2620 (Köln Hansaring-Köln); 2670 (Köln-Köln Posthof); 2621 (Köln Posthof–Flughafen NO); 2692 (Flughafen NO–Frankfurter Str); 2655 (Frankfurter Str–Overath); 2657 (Overath–Gummersbach-Dieringhausen); 2810 (Dieringhausen–Lüdenscheid-Brügge); 2813 (Lüdenscheid-Brügge–Lüdenscheid)
- Locale: North Rhine-Westphalia

Service
- Route number: 459

Technical
- Line length: 97 km (60 mi)
- Operating speed: 120 km/h (74.6 mph) (maximum)

The Oberbergische Bahn (RB 25) is a Regionalbahn rail service running between Cologne Hansaring and Lüdenscheid in the German state of North Rhine-Westphalia (NRW).

This service is operated by DB Regio NRW with Alstom Coradia LINT 54 and 81 railcars.

== Route ==
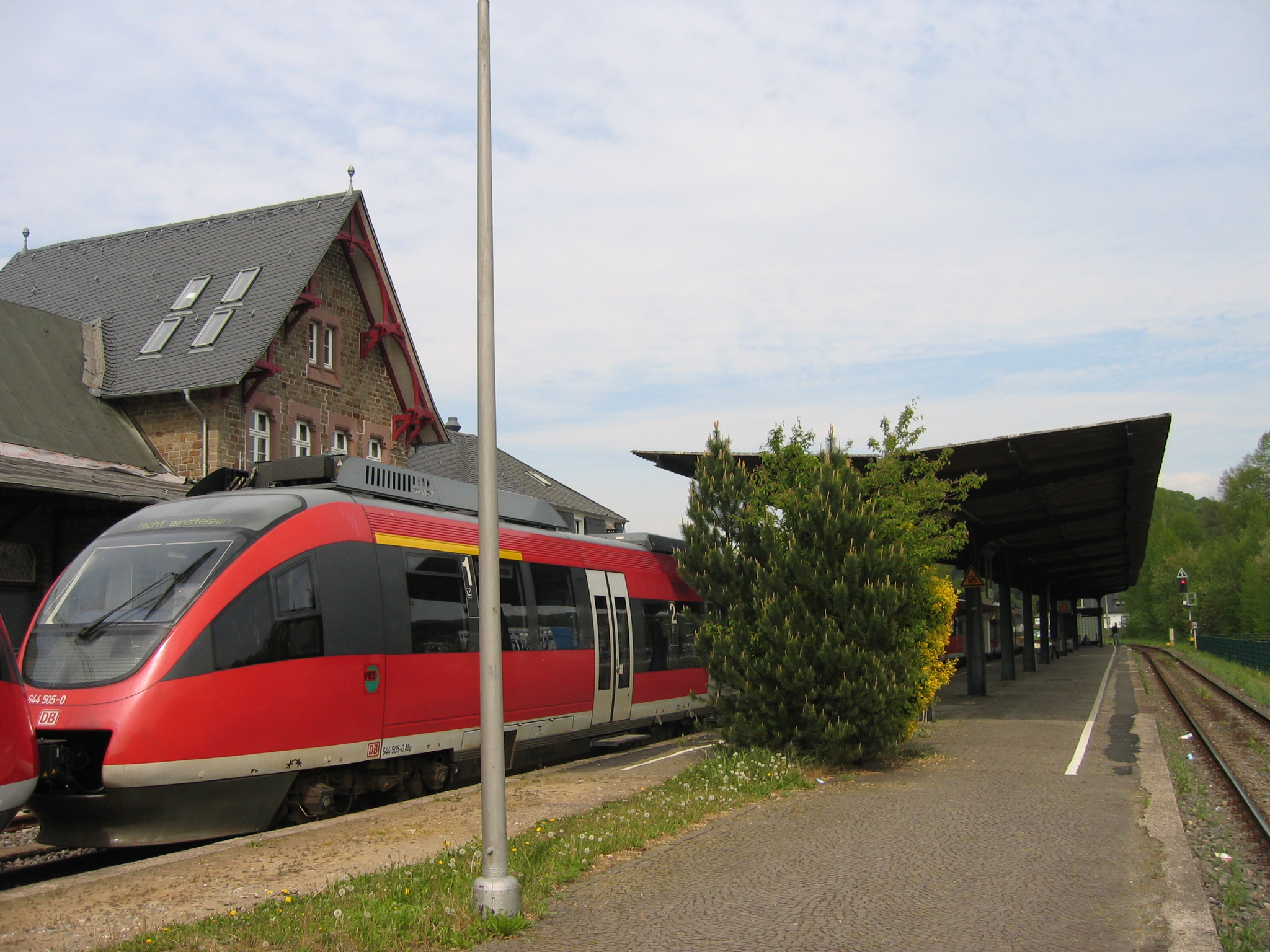
Overath station

The RB 25 service starts at Cologne Hansaring and runs over the tracks of the S-Bahn line to the Cologne–Overath railway to Overath then on the Siegburg–Olpe railway (also called the Agger Valley Railway) to Gummersbach-Dieringhausen, continuing over the Hagen–Dieringhausen railway (Volme Valley Railway) and Lüdenscheid-Brügge to its terminus at Lüdenscheid.

The RB 25 service runs on the section between Cologne Hansaring and Gummersbach every half hour. Trains continue from Gummersbach to Lüdenscheid hourly.

== Fares ==
Fares on the entire line are regulated by Verkehrsverbund Rhein-Sieg (Rhine-Sieg Transport Association).

== Extension to Lüdenscheid ==
Oliver Wittke, the former NRW transport minister, turned down a proposal to reactivate the entire section in 2005. The Marienheide–Meinerzhagen section returned to operation in 2013. The section of the Volme Valley Railway between Meinerzhagen and Lüdenscheid-Brügge was finally reactivated at the timetable change in December 2017. Now trains from Cologne can run directly to Lüdenscheid.

Since, work at Meinerzhagen station was largely completed by December 2017, the stations Kierspe and Halver-Oberbügge were reopened in December 2019.

== Future ==
It is proposed to operate the section between Cologne Hansaring and Marienheide at 20-minute intervals. This, however, requires the part of the line to be duplicated. It is proposed that the line be integrated into the network of the Rhine-Sieg S-Bahn and be extended through Cologne to the Eifel Railway.

In March 2011, the Nahverkehr Westfalen-Lippe (Westphalia-Lippe Regional Transport) awarded operations of the Cologne diesel network (Kölner Dieselnetz) to DB Regio Rheinland from December 2013 for 20 years. This contract requires the following actions on the Oberbergische network to be undertaken:

- line extension (reactivation) from Marienheide to Meinerzhagen
- duplication of the Dieringhausen–Gummersbach section
- measures to raise speeds between Köln-Porz and Rösrath
- increased services on the Overath–Engelskirchen section by increasing services between Cologne and Overath (13 services from Monday to Friday)
- increased services on the Overath–Gummersbach section to 14 services from Monday to Friday
- an extra service in the morning peak from Overath (7:11 AM) to Cologne (7:48 AM)
- establishment of a half-hourly service between Marienheide and Gummersbach between 7:00 and 8:00 AM for students and school children.

Alstom Coradia LINT 54 and 81 railcars are used for the service.
