= Köln Hansaring station =

Railway station in Germany

Köln Hansaring
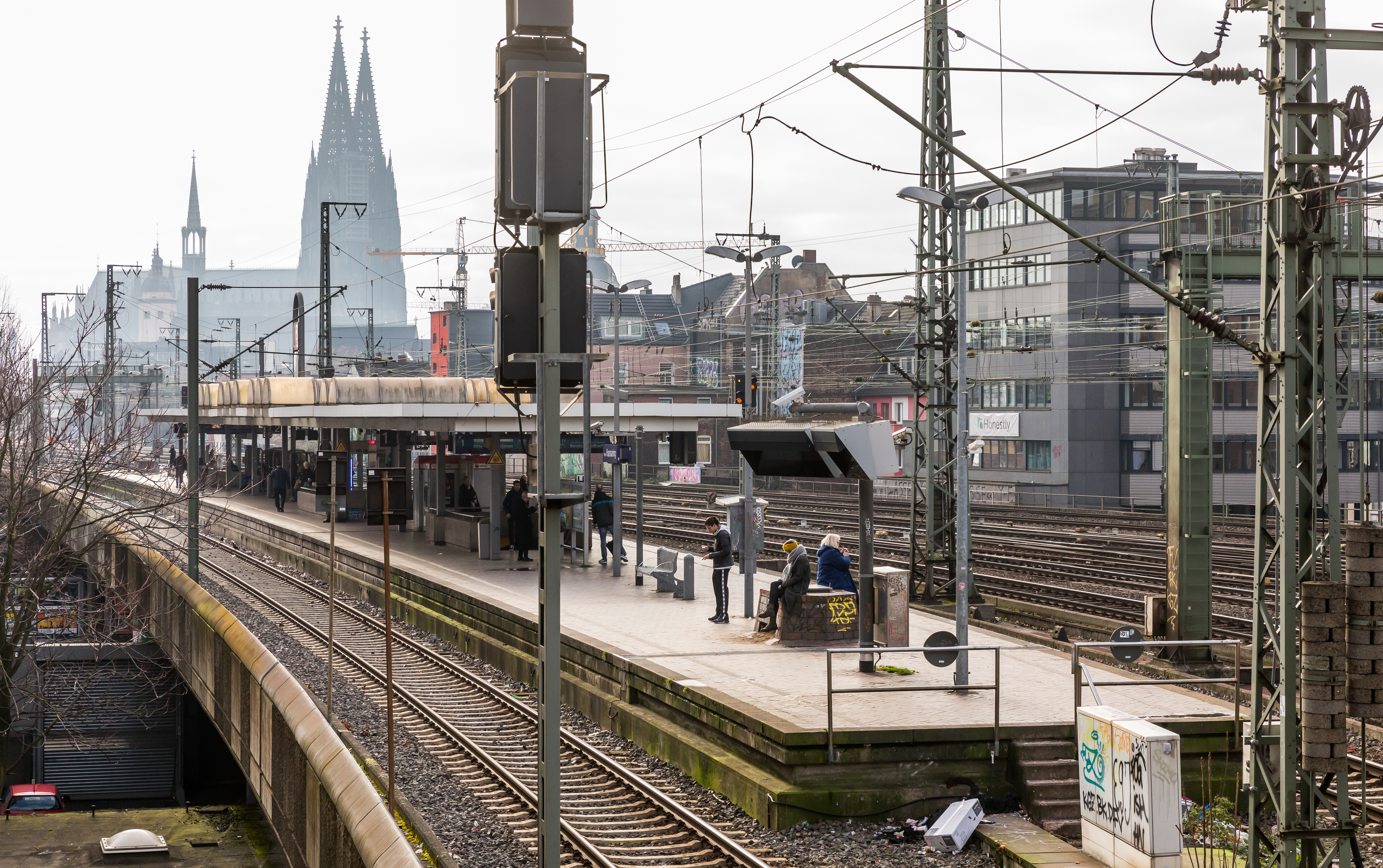
- Köln Hansaring S-Bahn station

General information
- Location: Hansaring 80, Innenstadt, Cologne, NRW; Germany
- Coordinates: 50°56′57″N 6°57′09″E
- Lines: Cologne–Aachen; Cologne–Krefeld; Ring tunnel
- Platforms: 2

Construction
- Accessible: Yes

Other information
- Station code: 3331
- DS100 code: KKHR, KKHRW
- IBNR: 8003392
- Category: 4
- Fare zone: VRS: 2100
- Website: www.bahnhof.de

History
- Opened: 1990

Services
Preceding station	DB Regio NRW	Following station
Terminus	RB 25	Köln Hbf towards Lüdenscheid
Preceding station	Rhine-Ruhr S-Bahn	Following station
Köln-Nippes Terminus	S6	Köln Hbf towards Essen Hbf
Preceding station	Cologne S-Bahn	Following station
Köln-Nippes towards Düsseldorf Airport Terminal	S11	Köln Hbf towards Bergisch Gladbach
Köln-Ehrenfeld towards Horrem	S12	Köln Hbf towards Au (Sieg)
Köln-Ehrenfeld towards Düren	S19	Köln Hbf towards Au (Sieg)
Preceding station	Cologne Stadtbahn	Following station
Ebertplatz towards Merkenich	Line 12	Christophstraße/Mediapark towards Zollstock Südfriedhof
Ebertplatz towards Köln-Chorweiler or Longerich Friedhof	Line 15	Christophstraße/Mediapark towards Ubierring
Location
- Location within North Rhine-Westphalia

Köln Hansaring railway station is situated in the city of Cologne in the German state of North Rhine-Westphalia, about one kilometre (0.62 mi) northwest of Köln Hauptbahnhof.

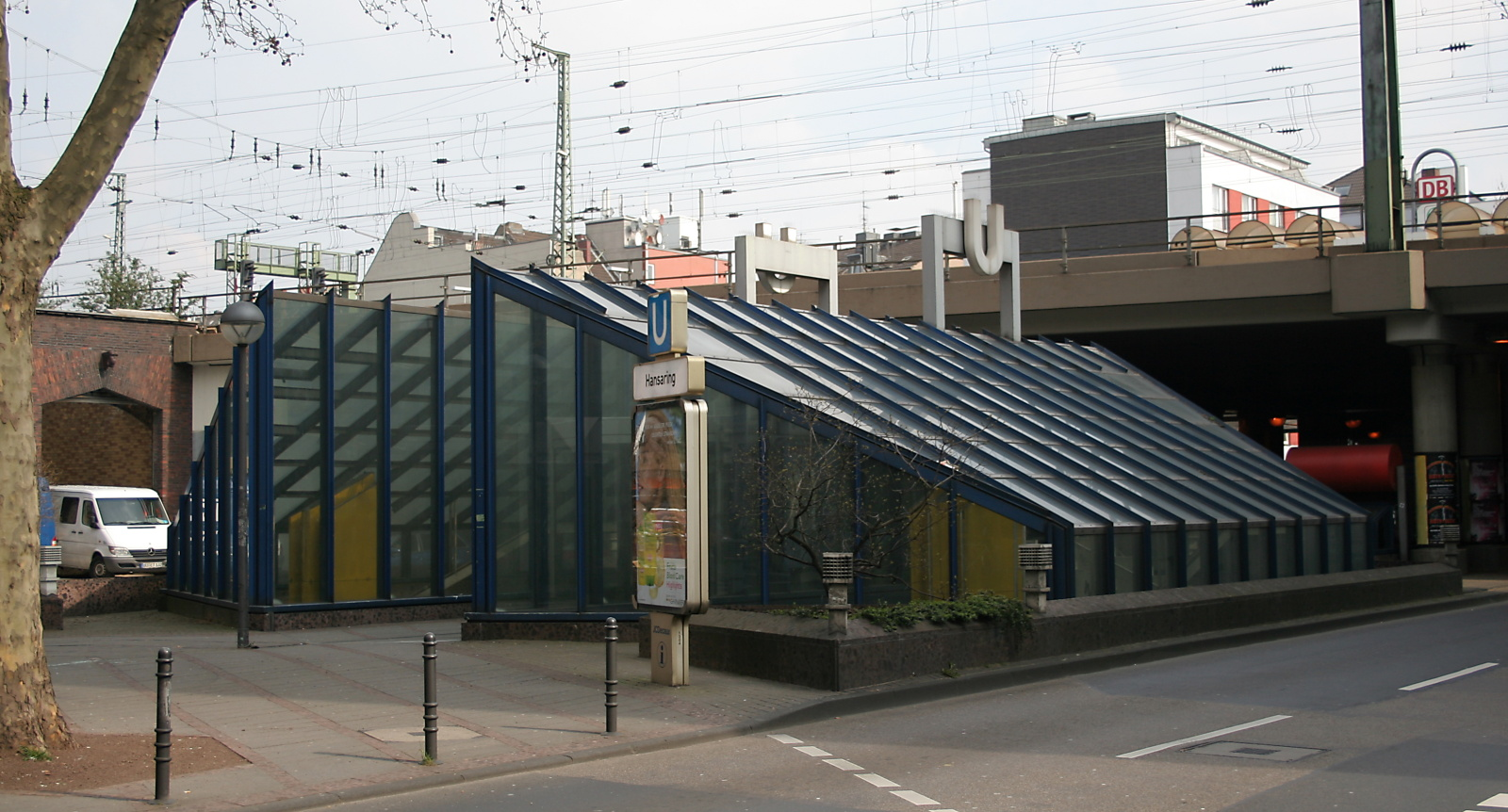
Northern access to the Stadtbahn station under the railway bridge

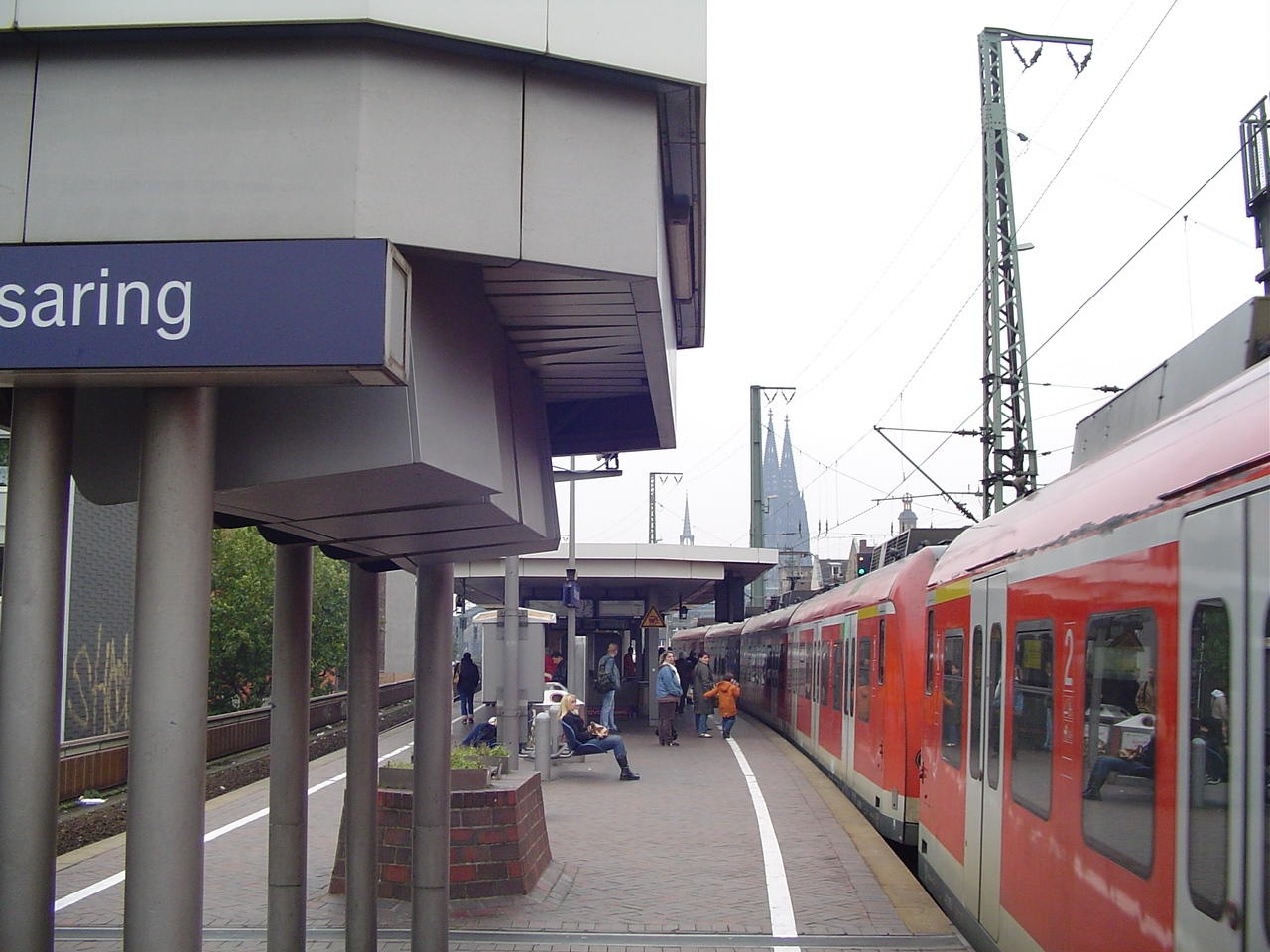
Köln-Hansaring station

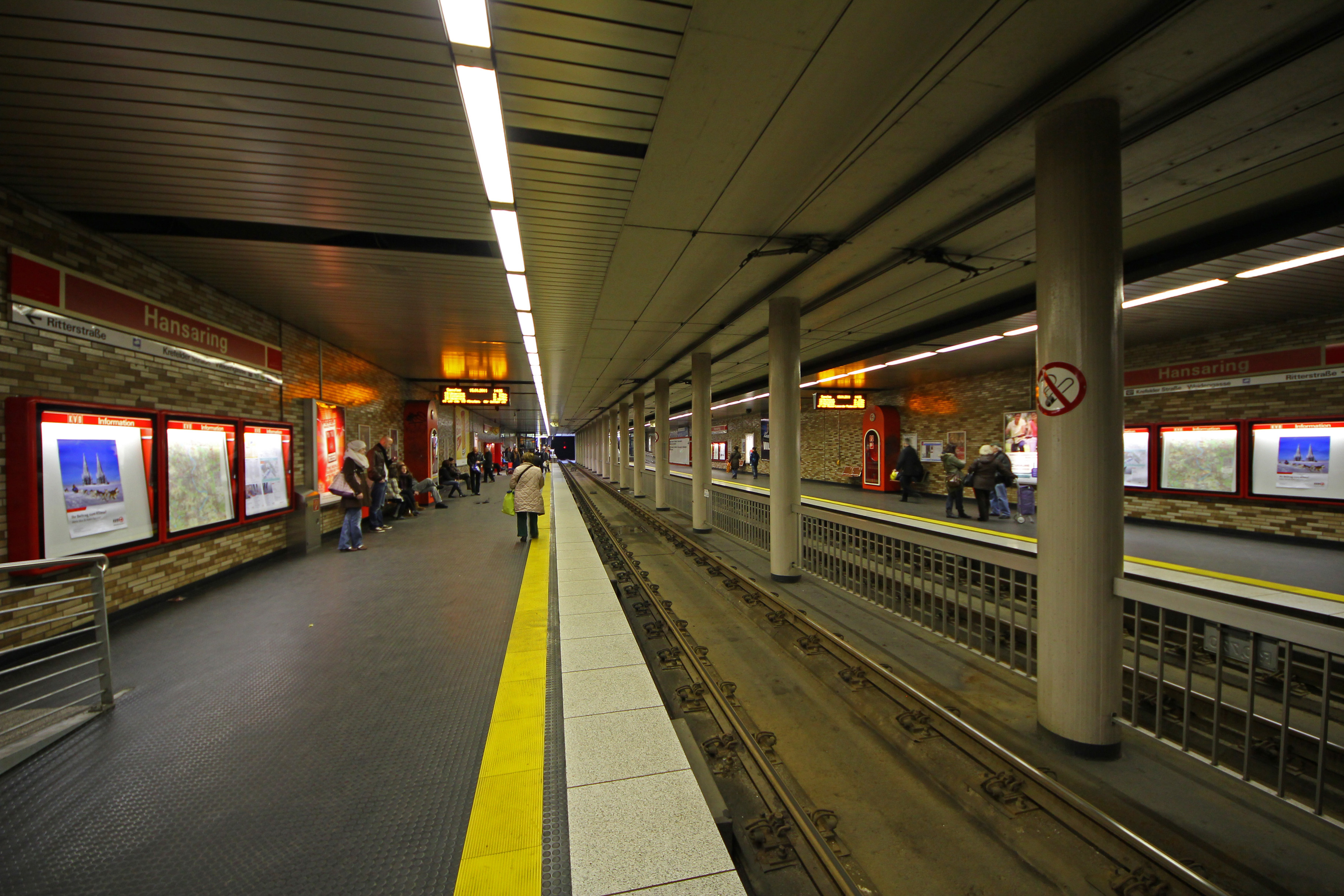
Stadtbahn platforms

A few hundred metres west of the station is the Betriebsbahnhof Köln Hansaring Wendeanlage (Köln Hansaring operations station reversing facility). At the station Rhine-Ruhr S-Bahn line S 11 branches off towards Neuss Hauptbahnhof via Köln-Nippes station and Köln-Chorweiler on the Lower Left Rhine Railway from S-Bahn line S 12, which runs parallel to the Cologne–Aachen high-speed railway to Düren via Köln-Ehrenfeld and Köln-Weiden West station.

The station (which is classified as a Haltepunkt, that is a "halt", which is defined as having no set of points) and the operating station together form the western end of the trunk line of the Cologne S-Bahn (which is operated as part of the Rhine-Ruhr S-Bahn). It is classified by Deutsche Bahn as a category 4 station. The S-Bahn trains stop here on an island platform, which has a length of 145 metres (475 ft 9 in).

A large part of the platform is located on a bridge over a street called Hansaring. There is a covered connection between the Hansaring S-Bahn station and the Hansaring station of the Cologne Stadtbahn in the median strip of the Hansaring.

== History ==
Köln Hansaring station has a long rail history. As early as 1859, the new connection between the West Rhine Railway (Linke Rheinstrecke) and Cologne Central Station crossed the medieval city walls at this point. In 1881 the city walls were demolished and replaced by a wide ring road, which was called the Hansaring (Hansa Ring) in reference to Cologne's past as a Hanseatic city. With the construction of the new main station, the railway tracks were raised by six metres from 1889. There was already at that time a horse tramway on the Hansaring, which was replaced by an electric tramway in 1903.

In the early 1970s, the Hansaring Stadtbahn tunnel was built and an underground station was opened to traffic at a shallow depth on 25 August 1974. New tracks were built for the S-Bahn on the north side of the existing railway line. The S-Bahn station was connected to the Stadtbahn station and the Stadtbahn station was rebuilt with a high platform for two-thirds of its length. The station was inaugurated on 27 May 1990. At Easter 2003, half of the high platform was reduced in height so that it could be used by coupled low-floor vehicles on the Stadtbahn ring route.

== Services ==
=== S-Bahn and Local train RB25 ===
Köln Hansaring station is served by the following regional services:

Line	Route	Frequency
S6	Köln-Nippes – Köln Hansaring – Köln Hauptbahnhof – Leverkusen – Langenfeld – Düsseldorf Hauptbahnhof – Essen	20 min
S11	Duesseldorf – Neuss Hauptbahnhof – Dormagen – Köln-Chorweiler – Köln-Nippes – Cologne Hansaring – Köln Hauptbahnhof – Bergisch Gladbach	20 min
S12	(Horrem –) Cologne-Ehrenfeld – Köln Hansaring – Köln Hauptbahnhof – Porz (Rhein) – Troisdorf – Siegburg/Bonn – Hennef – Au (Sieg)	20 min
S19	Düren — Sindorf — Horrem – Köln-Ehrenfeld – Köln Hansaring – Köln Hauptbahnhof – Cologne/Bonn Airport – Troisdorf – Siegburg/Bonn – Hennef – Au (Sieg)	20/40 min
RB 25	Köln Hansaring – Köln Hauptbahnhof – Roesrath - Honrath - Overath - Engelskirchen - Gummersbach – Marienheide - Meinerzhagen	30 min (every 30 min to Overath) (in the rush hour every 30 min to Engelskirchen) (always every 60 min to Meinerzhagen)

=== Stadtbahn trains ===
The station is served by the following Stadtbahn services:

Line	Route	Frequency
12	Merkenich – Niehl – Nippes – Ebertplatz – Hansaring – Friesenplatz – Barbarossaplatz – Zollstock	10 min
15	Chorweiler – Longerich – Nippes – Ebertplatz – Hansaring – Friesenplatz – Barbarossaplatz – Ubierring	10 min^{1}

^{1}In the peak hour every 5 minutes between Longerich and Ubierring

=== Other services ===
A city bus stop and a Bike and Ride (B+R) faciality are located at the station.
