= Lüdenscheid station =

Railway station in Lüdenscheid, Germany

Lüdenscheid
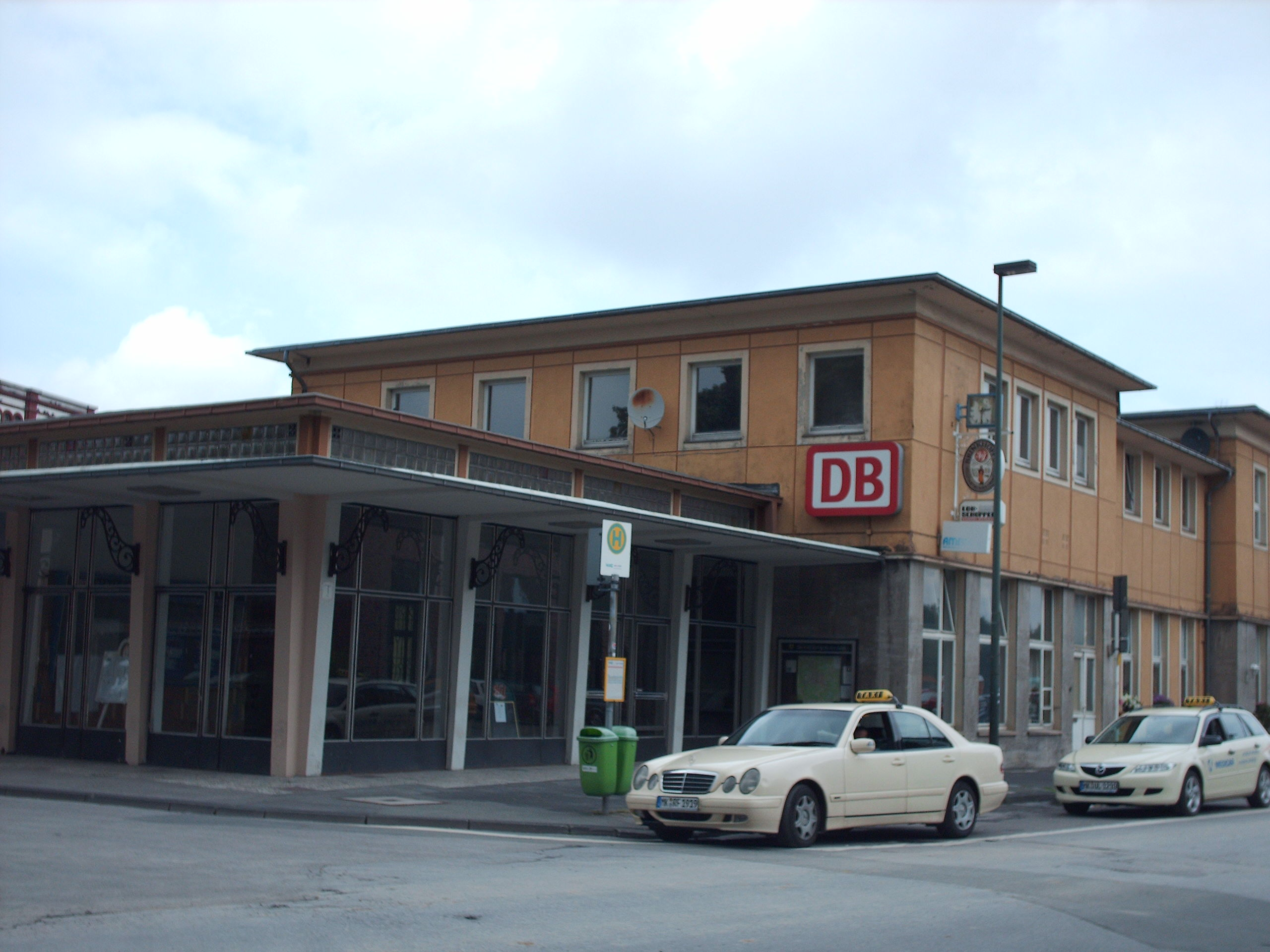
- Former station building (demolished in 2009)

General information
- Location: Bahnhofstraße 26, Lüdenscheid, NRW; Germany
- Coordinates: 51°13′14″N 7°37′44″E
- Owner: Deutsche Bahn
- Operator: DB Netz; DB Station&Service
- Line: Brügge–Lüdenscheid (KBS 434)
- Platforms: 1

Construction
- Accessible: Yes

Other information
- Station code: 3828
- DS100 code: ELS
- IBNR: 8003782
- Category: 6
- Fare zone: Westfalentarif: 48511
- Website: www.bahnhof.de

History
- Opened: 6 September 1874

Services
Preceding station	DB Regio NRW	Following station
Lüdenscheid-Brügge towards Köln Hansaring	RB 25	Terminus
Lüdenscheid-Brügge towards Dortmund Hbf	RB 52	Terminus
Location
- Location within North Rhine-Westphalia Location within Germany Location within Europe

Lüdenscheid station is the terminus of a single-track branch line from Lüdenscheid-Brügge to Lüdenscheid in the German state of North Rhine-Westphalia. It branches in Brügge from the Hagen–Dieringhausen railway. It is classified by DB Station&Service as a category 6 station.

The station is on the edge of the centre of the district town of Lüdenscheid. The only platform extends up to Bahnhofstrasse (station street) and is at ground level. Central Lüdenscheid is easily accessible within a few minutes. Around the station the Lüdenscheid suburb of Grünewald also extends to the north and west and Knapp extends to the south.

== History ==
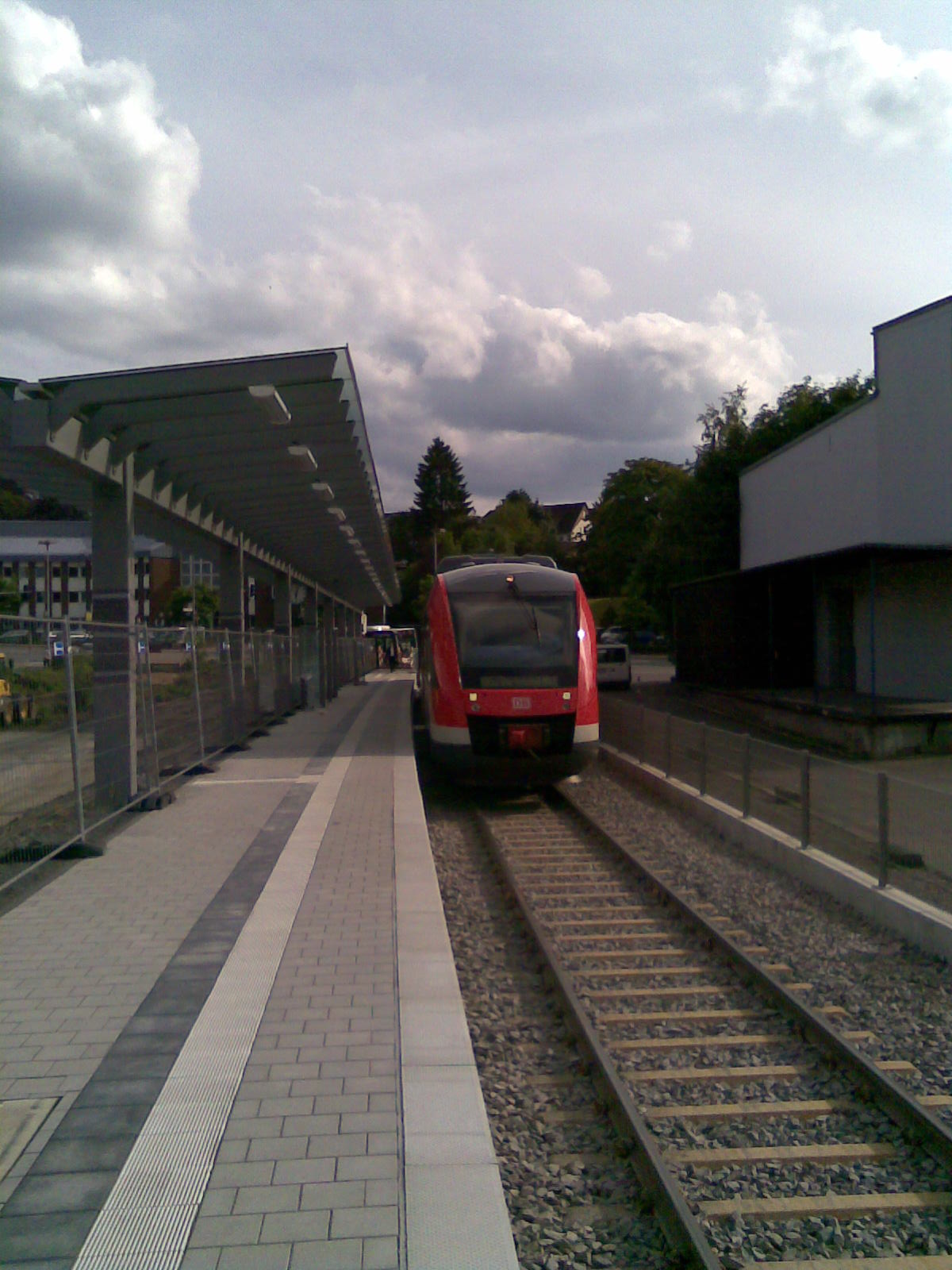
New Lüdenscheid station (June 2009)

The railway line between Lüdenscheid-Brügge station and Lüdenscheid station opened in 1880 by the Prussian state railways. Five years later, the metre-gauge Altena District Railway (Kreis Altenaer Eisenbahn, KAE) was opened, which had its station near the state station. Even today, there is a narrow road in Lüdenscheid that follows the route of the Altena District Railway from the current Altenaer Straße to the Lüdenscheid station of the KAE. Lüdenscheid had 20,000 inhabitants in 1894 and, according to archive reports, it was the most industrialised city in Germany in 1895. Thus, traffic at Lüdenscheid station had been increasing rapidly and has been further enhanced by freight traffic fed by the KAE.

In 1963, a concept of the urban management of Lüdenscheid was presented in which the current Sauerfelder Straße would be rebuilt on 2 levels and the Brügge–Lüdenscheid railway would be placed underground running from Lüdenscheid station at a grade of only one percent. The railway line would then have terminated at a second underground station in the central transport hub of Sauerfeld in central Lüdenscheid. In addition, 500 parking spaces would have been built below the square in front of the current town hall. At the time this project was considered to be a utopian idea, but it was rejected.

The formerly important station building of Lüdenscheid station, which had been built in 1960, was demolished in 2009. Located in this building there was a ticket office, a restaurant and a waiting room. In place of the old station building a four-storey building has been built with a driving school, a newsagent, a taxi company, a bakery and toilets. This will offer rail passengers an attractive waiting room. On 27 July 2012, a report appeared in the Lüdenscheider Nachrichten that a new building will be completed in 2013 with a DB service centre, waiting room and toilets for passengers. In addition, there will be apartments for students at the local university and commercial space such as for medical services.

== Station area ==
On the precincts of the former station are now located the Lüdenscheid tax office and a wood trading company. In addition, a new campus of the Fachhochschule Südwestfalen (University of Applied Sciences of South Westphalia) for up to 600 students was built by February 2012. In addition, some service companies have relocated on the site.

The adjacent Bahnhofallee has been recently connected via the street of Zum Weißen Pferd to Altenaer Straße and can be used by both cars and buses. In addition, a walkway now connects Bahnhofallee to the upper end of Zum Weißen Pferd. Until then, Bahnhofallee had been a dead end for vehicles and pedestrian and could only be reached from the station area.

== Rail services ==
The station is served by two Regionalbahn lines:

Line	Route	Frequency
RB 52; Volmetal-Bahn	Lüdenscheid – Lüdenscheid-Brügge – Schalksmühle – Hagen – Dortmund	Hourly
RB 25; Oberbergische Bahn	Köln Hansaring – Köln Hbf – Köln Messe/Deutz – Köln Trimbornstraße – Köln Frankfurter Straße – Rösrath-Stümpen – Rösrath – Hoffnungsthal – Honrath – Overath – Engelskirchen – Ründeroth – Gummersbach-Dieringhausen – Gummersbach – Marienheide – Meinerzhagen – Kierspe – Halver-Oberbrügge – Lüdenscheid-Brügge – Lüdenscheid	hourly/bihourly

== Bus services ==
Bus services are operated the Märkische Verkehrsgesellschaft (Märkische Transport Company, MVG) and Busverkehr Ruhr-Sieg (Ruhr-Sieg Bus Transport, BRS) on several routes. Since the timetable change in August 2010, the station has been the second central bus station (ZOB) in Lüdenscheid) with Lüdenscheid Sauerfeld. The station consists of five bus bays, 4 of which connect directly with the platform, and is served by 18 bus routes:

Line	Route	Frequency (mins) (Mon–Fri)	Frequency (mins) (Sat)	Frequency (mins) (Sun)
S1	Lüdenscheid, Sauerfeld ZOB – Lüdenscheid (→ Iserlohn) – Altena, Bahnhof – Nachrodt, Amtshaus – Iserlohn – Iserlohn, Konrad-Adenauer-Ring ZOB	30 / 60	No services	No services
S2	Lüdenscheid – Lüdenscheid, Sauerfeld ZOB – Lüdenscheid, Worth – Werdohl – Plettenberg, Ohle Post – Plettenberg, Bahnhof – Plettenberg, Grünestraße ZOB	30 / 60	60	60
41	Lüdenscheid, Schubertstraße – Lüdenscheid – Lüdenscheid, Sauerfeld ZOB – Lüdenscheid, Kulturhaus – Lüdenscheid, Worth – Lüdenscheid, Eichholz	15 / 30	15 / 30	30
42	Lüdenscheid, Noell – Lüdenscheid – Lüdenscheid, Sauerfeld ZOB – Lüdenscheid, Kulturhaus – Lüdenscheid, Niederschemm Wendestelle	30 / 60	30 / 60	60
43	Lüdenscheid – Lüdenscheid, Sauerfeld ZOB – Lüdenscheid, Kulturhaus – Lüdenscheid, Worth – Lüdenscheid, Am Flachsacker	120	120	No services
44	Lüdenscheid, Freisenberg – Lüdenscheid – Lüdenscheid, Sauerfeld ZOB – Lüdenscheid, Kulturhaus – Lüdenscheid, Europa-Allee	30 / 60	30 / 60	60
46	Lüdenscheid – Lüdenscheid, Kulturhaus – Lüdenscheid, Sauerfeld ZOB – Lüdenscheid, Nattenberg – Lüdenscheid, Im Hasley – Lüdenscheid, Baukloh	60	60	120
47	Lüdenscheid, Eichholz – Lüdenscheid, Kulturhaus – Lüdenscheid, Sauerfeld ZOB – Lüdenscheid (→ Halver) – Lüdenscheid, Brügge Bf – Halver, Ostendorf	30 / 60	30 / 60	60
49	Lüdenscheid, Kulturhaus – Lüdenscheid, Sauerfeld ZOB – Lüdenscheid (→ Iserlohn) – Nachrodt, Amtshaus – Iserlohn, Lasbeck	Irregular services	Irregular services	No services
51	Lüdenscheid – Lüdenscheid, Sauerfeld ZOB – Lüdenscheid, Kulturhaus – Lüdenscheid, Am Brutenberg	30 / (bus route 54)	30 / (bus route 54)	No services / (bus route 54)
54	Lüdenscheid – Lüdenscheid, Sauerfeld ZOB – Herscheid, Markt – Herscheid, Hüinghausen – Plettenberg, Grünestraße ZOB	30 / 60	30 / 60	60
87	Lüdenscheid, Kulturhaus – Lüdenscheid, Sauerfeld ZOB – Lüdenscheid (→ Schalksmühle) – Schalksmühle, Reeswinkel	30 / 60	60	60
134	Lüdenscheid, Kulturhaus – Lüdenscheid, Sauerfeld ZOB – Lüdenscheid (→ Radevormwald) – Radevormwald busbahnhof	30 / 60	60	60
246	Lüdenscheid, Sauerfeld ZOB – Lüdenscheid, Kulturhaus – Lüdenscheid, Im Hasley – Lüdenscheid, Nattenberg – Lüdenscheid (→ Lüdenscheid, Hs. Schöneck) – Lüdenscheid, Hs. Schöneck	Irregular services	No services	No services
252	Lüdenscheid – Lüdenscheid, Sauerfeld ZOB – Lüdenscheid, Kulturhaus – Meinerzhagen, Valbert Ort – Meinerzhagen, Stadthalle ZOB (excursion bus route)	No services	No services	120
254	Plettenberg, Grünestraße ZOB – Herscheid, Hüinghausen – Herscheid, Markt – Lüdenscheid, Sauerfeld ZOB – Lüdenscheid (→ Lüdenscheid, Wehberg) – Lüdenscheid, Wehberg Wendestelle	Irregular services	No services	No services
N4	Lüdenscheid, Sauerfeld ZOB – Lüdenscheid (→ Schalksmühle) – Schalksmühle, Rathausplatz – Schalksmühle, Mitte – Schalksmühle, Strücken (night bus route)	1 service on Fri at about 0:12 AM	1 service on Sat at about 0:12 AM	No services
N7	Plettenberg station – Herscheid, Hüinghausen – Herscheid, Markt – Lüdenscheid, Sauerfeld ZOB – Lüdenscheid (→ Christuskirche) – Lüdenscheid, Christuskirche (night bus route)	1 service on Fri at about 1:58 AM	1 service on Sat at about 1:58 AM	No services
