= Meinerzhagen =

- Town
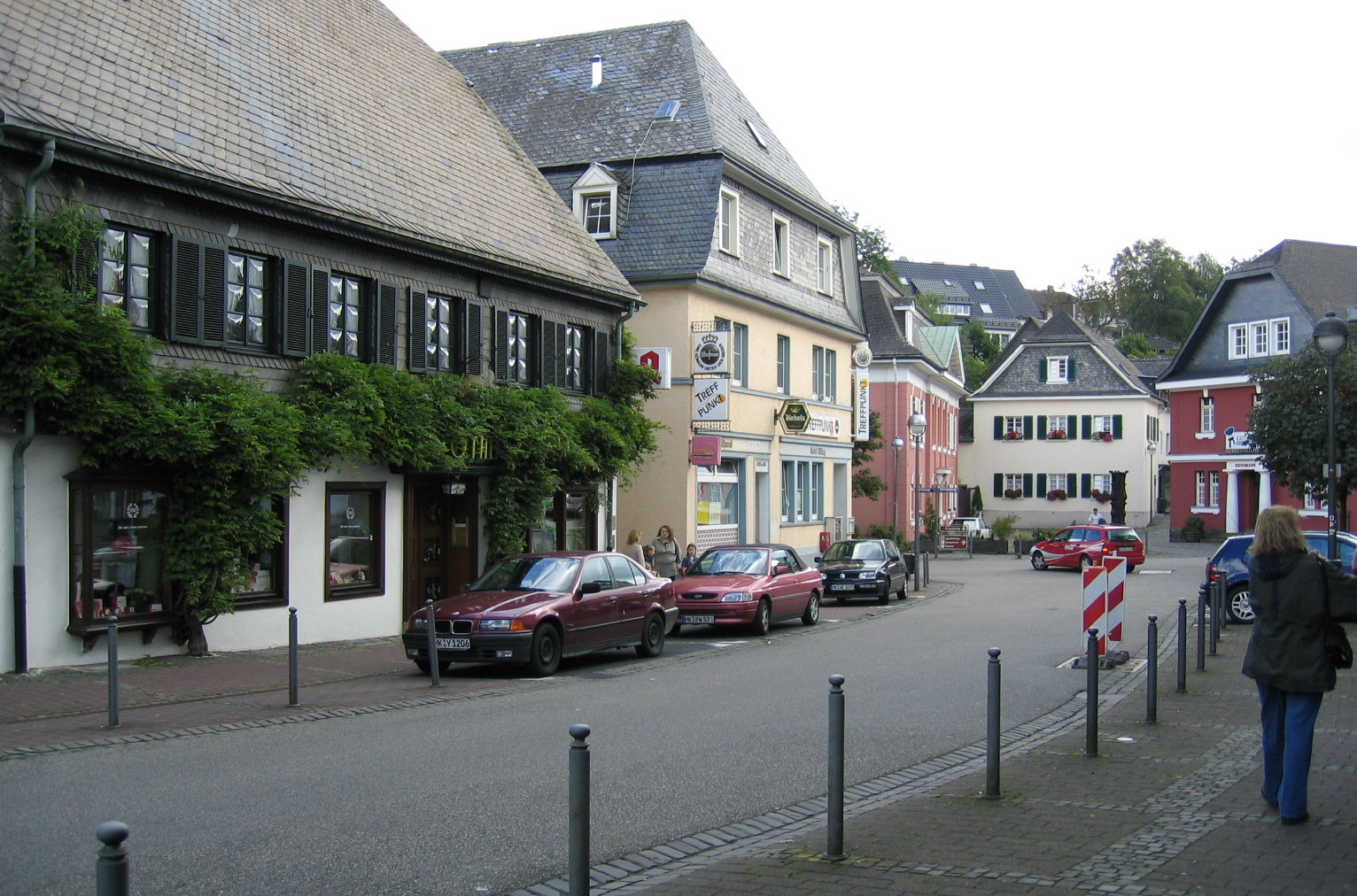
- Near the city center

- Coat of arms

- Location of Meinerzhagen within Märkischer Kreis district
- Interactive map of Meinerzhagen
- Location within Germany Location within North Rhine-Westphalia
- Coordinates: 51°07′N 07°38′E
- Country: Germany
- State: North Rhine-Westphalia
- Admin. region: Arnsberg
- District: Märkischer Kreis
- Subdivisions: 9

Government
  - Mayor (2020–25): Jan Nesselrath (CDU)

Area
  - Total: 115.67 km^{2} (44.66 sq mi)
- Elevation: 313–652 m (1,027–2,139 ft)

Population (2025-12-31)
  - Total: 20,003
  - Density: 172.93/km^{2} (447.89/sq mi)
- Time zone: UTC+01:00 (CET)
  - Summer (DST): UTC+02:00 (CEST)
- Postal codes: 58540
- Dialling codes: 02354; 02358 (Valbert)
- Vehicle registration: MK
- Website: www.meinerzhagen.de

Meinerzhagen (German pronunciation: [ˈmaɪnɐtsˌhaːɡn̩]; sometimes spelled Meinertzhagen) is a town in the Märkischer Kreis, North Rhine-Westphalia, Germany.

== Geography ==
Meinerzhagen is located in the hills of the Sauerland. The highest elevation is the Nordhelle with 652 m above sea level, the lowest elevation at the Lister dam with 319m. 56% of the town area is covered by forests.

=== Neighbouring municipalities ===
- Kierspe
- Lüdenscheid
- Herscheid
- Marienheide
- Attendorn
- Gummersbach
- Drolshagen

=== Division of the town ===
The town consists of the following villages and places:

- Am Lingelchen
- An der Hardt
- Baberg
- Badinghagen
- Beckerhof
- Berg
- Berlinghausen
- Beutringhausen
- Blomberg
- Börlinghausen
- Bomme
- Borneck
- Brachtenberg
- Breddershaus
- Buntelichte
- Buschhausen
- Buschhöh
- Butmicke
- Darmche
- Denndorf
- Drögenpütt
- Dürhölten
- Ebberg
- Echternhagen
- Eckertsmühle
- Eick
- Elminghausen
- Eseloh
- Eulenberg
- Freisemicke
- Fumberg
- Genkel
- Gerringhausen
- Gräfingholz
- Grotewiese
- Grünenbecke
- Grünental
- Grünewald
- Güntenbecke
- Häusger Mühle
- Hahnenbecke
- Hardenberg
- Hasendenn
- Haumche
- Haumchermühle
- Haustadt
- Heed
- Heerhof
- Hemcherhagen
- Herberg
- Herringhausen
- Herweg
- Hesselbecke
- Hinter der Höh
- Höh
- Hösinghausen
- Hohenhengstenberg
- Hohlinden
- Holbecke
- Hülseberg
- Hunswinkel
- Ihne
- Imhausen
- Ingemert
- Ingemerterhammer
- Ingemertermühle
- Ingemertstraße
- Kittmicke
- Korbecke
- Kotten
- Kropplenberg
- Krummenerl
- Langenohl
- Lengelscheid
- Lesmicke
- Listerhammer
- Listringhausen
- Meinerzhagen
- Mettgenberg
- Mittel-Worbscheid
- Mittelhagen
- Möllsiepen
- Mühlhofe
- Neu-Grünental
- Neuemühle
- Neuhohlinden
- Niederbadinghagen
- Niederhengstenberg
- Nocken
- Nordhellen
- Ober-Worbscheid
- Oberingemert
- Österfeld
- Ohl
- Pütthof
- Redlendorf
- Reuen
- Rinkscheid
- Rollsiepen
- Rosenburg
- Schaffeld
- Schallershaus
- Scherl
- Scherlerwieden
- Schleifkotten
- Schlenke
- Schlund
- Schmittepaul
- Schnüffel
- Schoppen
- Schürfelde
- Schwenke
- Sebastopol
- Sellenrade
- Siepen
- Sinderhauf
- Sinderhof
- Singerbrink
- Spädinghausen
- Steinsgüntenbecke
- Steinsmark
- Stoltenberg
- Sulenbecke
- Sundfeld
- Tarrenbrink
- Unter-Worbscheid
- Unterm Berge
- Valbert
- Vestenberg
- Volmehof
- Vorderhagen
- Voßsiepen
- Wehe
- Weißenpferd
- Werkshagen
- Werlsiepen
- Westebbe
- Wickeschliede
- Wiebche
- Wiebelsaat
- Wieden
- Wilkenberg
- Willertshagen
- Windebruch
- Winzenberg
- Wormgermühle

== History ==
In 1765 Meinerzhagen received city rights from King Frederick II of Prussia, however in 1865 the city abandoned them to save administrative costs. In 1846 the Amt Meinerzhagen was formed, covering both Meinerzhagen and the municipality of Valbert. On September 19, 1964, Meinerzhagen received city rights again.

In the communal reform of the district Altena in 1969, Meinerzhagen was merged with Valbert, the Amt Meinerzhagen was dissolved.

The family name of the British World War I officer Richard Meinertzhagen recalls an ancestor who came from this town.

== Population ==
Historical population

Year	Pop.	±% p.a.
1965	16,178	—
1970	17,822	+1.95%
1975	18,517	+0.77%
1980	19,030	+0.55%
1985	19,185	+0.16%
1990	19,907	+0.74%
1995	21,554	+1.60%

Year	Pop.	±% p.a.
2000	21,884	+0.30%
2005	21,752	−0.12%
2010	20,838	−0.85%
2015	20,670	−0.16%
2020	20,529	−0.14%
2025	20,003	−0.52%

Source: Landesdatabank Nordrhein-Westfalen

== Coat of arms ==
The coat of arms of Meinerzhagen shows a red lion as the symbol of the Duchy of Berg, placed on a blue St. Andrew's cross on yellow ground, referring to the family von Badinghagen, which became extinct in the 17th century. The bottom part of the coat of arms shows the red-and-white-chequered bordure as the symbol of the Mark. A yellow horn is placed on top of the bordure, taken from the coat of arms of the municipality of Valbert. The coat of arms was granted on June 14, 1975.

Before the merging of Meinerzhagen and Valbert, the two towns as well as the Amt Meinerzhagen had their individual coats of arms. The coat of arms of Meinerzhagen dates back to at least 1857, as the town hall, built in 1857, already showed the coat of arms above its entrance. The coat of arms had a green bottom part, top left Saint Mary on a throne, holding a scepter, with Jesus as an infant, and top right a building with three towers and red roofs, and the sun and two stars above.

The coat of arms of the municipality of Valbert showed both the chequered bordure as well as the black cross of Cologne in the bottom part, as the municipality consisted of parts of the Mark as well as of the Electorate of Cologne. The top part shows a hunter, which, similar to the coat of arms of the neighboring municipality of Herscheid refers to the hunting privilege granted by John III, Duke of Cleves, the heir of the Duke of Mark. The coat of arms was designed by Otto Hupp, and was granted on October 27, 1935.

The coat of arms of the Amt Meinerzhagen combined symbols of the three historic states of the area. The bottom part shows the black cross of Cologne, the middle part the chequered bordure of the Mark, and the top the lion of Berg.

== Notable people ==
- Lars Labonte, soccer player
- Nuri Şahin, played for the soccer team of Meinerzhagen before joining professional soccer team Borussia Dortmund
- Jasmin Selberg, a Model who won The Miss International Price in 2022

== International relations ==
From 1961 to 2001 Meinerzhagen had a partnership with the Dutch municipality IJsselmuiden. In 2001 IJsselmuiden was incorporated into the city Kampen, which subsequently continued the partnership.

On April 12, 1987, the documents were signed for the partnership with the French town Saint-Cyr-sur-Loire.

== Transportation ==
Meinerzhagen is situated at the Oberbergische Bahn and offers hourly connections to Cologne and (status October 2019) every two hours a direct train to Lüdenscheid, with connections to Hagen and Dortmund.
