= DB Class 215 =

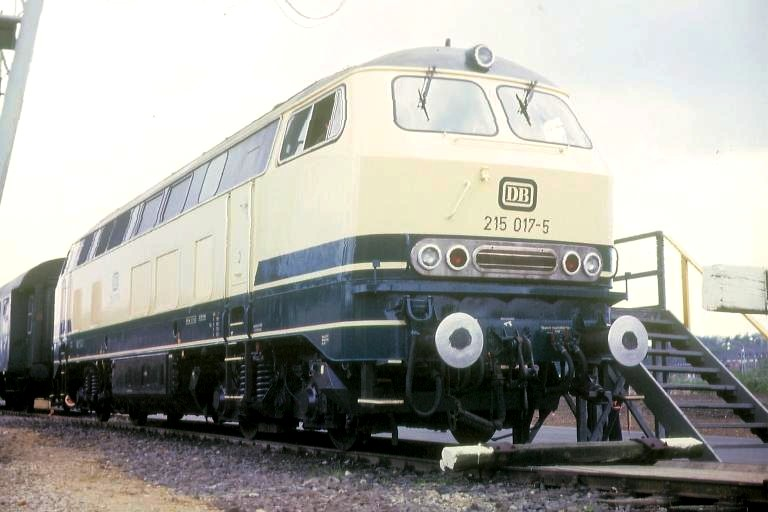
- DB Class 215 017
Type and origin
- Builder: Henschel, Krupp, Krauss-Maffei and MaK
- Serial number: prototypes: 215 001 to 215 010 remainder: 215 011 to 150
- Build date: 1968
- Total produced: 150
Specifications
- Configuration
  - UIC: B′B′
- Gauge: 1,435 mm (4 ft 8 1/2 in)
- Length: 16.4 m (53 ft 9.7 in)
- Loco weight: 79 t (78 long tons; 87 short tons) (2/3 of fuel and supply tanks full)
- Fuel type: Diesel
- Fuel capacity: 2,700 L (590 imp gal; 710 US gal)
- Lubricant cap.: 690 L (150 imp gal; 180 US gal)
- Water cap.: 2,850 L (630 imp gal; 750 US gal)
- Sandbox cap.: 320 kg (710 lb)
- Prime mover: 215 001-010, 071-093: Maybach MB 12 V 956 TB 10; 215 011-070, 094-150: MTU 16 V 652 TB
- Engine type: Diesel engine
- Cylinders: 215 001-010, 071-093: V12; 215 011-070, 094-150: V16
- Transmission: Voith L820 brs (or MTU K252 SUBB)
- MU working: All of class - with DB Class 211, 212, 213 and other from DB V 160 family
- Loco brake: Hydrodynamic brake, Air
- Train brakes: Air
- Safety systems: ETCS
Performance figures
- Maximum speed: 215 001 to 215 004: 130 km/h (81 mph); 215 005 onwards: 140 km/h (87 mph)
- Power output: V12 variant: 1,320 kW (1,770 hp); V16 variant: 1,840 kW (2,470 hp)
Career
- Operators: Deutsche Bahn

The DB Class 215 is a 4 axle diesel locomotive of the V 160 type. They were built for the German Federal Railways (Deutsche Bundesbahn) for medium-weight passenger and freight service on secondary and primary routes, and later passed to the Deutsche Bahn AG.

A number of variants were made by rebuilding; some were converted to Class 225 locomotives for freight only work for DB Cargo and the sub-class Class 215.9 were altered for use on the SyltShuttle.

== Background ==
The locomotives of Class 215 were a longer version of the original DB Class V 160, and consequently were equipped with steam heating apparatus. In the pre 1968 classification scheme they were to be numbered V 163.

The engines were built to the length of the DB Class 218 (400 millimetres (16 in) longer than a Class V 160), so that later they could be rebuilt to the same specification of the longer class, which at the time only existed as a prototype; the Deutsche Bundesbahn could not wait for the Class 218 to reach production maturity as it was forging ahead with the replacement of the last steam locomotives.

== Design and modifications ==
The locomotive has a diesel powertrain, using hydraulic transmission, with both bogies driven by cardan shafts, and all wheels powered.

The ten initial prototype machines built from 1968 to 1969 by Krupp were powered by diesel engines of type 12 V 956 TB 10 with a power of 1839 kW.

The machines numbered 215 011 to 215 070, and 215 094 to 215 150 had less powerful (1397 kW) but more reliable 16-cylinder Maybach MTU 16 V 652 TB engines (the same as the engines with which the Class 216 / V 160s were equipped), while the numbers 215 071 to 215 093 had a more powerful engine, but this time again the 12-cylinder 12 V 956 TB used in the prototypes. 215 091 to 215 093 were later retrofitted with the V-12 engine, having initially had the 16-cylinder engine.

The steam heating also doubled as a pre-heater for the locomotives engine, and other parts. Space was reserved for the installation of an electrical generator later on, the proposed conversion of the machines to the 218 series never came about - the exception was 215 112 which was rebuilt as DB Class 218 399 after an accident.

Numbers 030 to 032 locos were exceptional in that they were fitted from the outset with an electric heater (steam heating was removed) driven from an auxiliary diesel of type 8V 331 TC 10 with an output of 520 kW at 2100 rpm. Unlike in the DB Class 217 the auxiliary diesel is not connected to the transmission and cannot be used for additional traction power

DB Class 215.9
Type and origin
- Serial number: 215-901 to 215-914
- Rebuilder: Aw Bremen
- Rebuild date: Late 2003 / Early 2004
- Number rebuilt: 14
Specifications

=== Conversion variant 215.9 ===
In the summer of 2003, DB AutoZug acquired a total of 18 locomotives from DB Regio, 14 units were rebuilt in a fashion analogous to the DBAG Class 225 but numbered as Class 215.9. The remaining four locomotives were kept for spare parts.

The steam heating boilers needed fuel and water tanks which for this service were now unnecessary, thus they were replaced with a ballast weight, the engines remained unchanged. A GSM-R system was fitted, as well as automatic brake slack adjusters.

=== DBAG Class 225 ===
After passenger work for many of the DB Class 215 disappeared, DB Regio transferred 68 locomotives to DB Cargo (later Railion) for freight work, the steam heating boilers being removed and replaced with ballast. The new class was augmented by further DB Class 218 machines, which formed the subclass 225.8.

== Operations ==
=== Class 215 ===
The class were used on all types of train; the main area of used was on the Eifel rail (Cologne to Trier) in the Lower Rhine and Baden-Wuerttemberg area down to Lake Constance.

One high-profile working in the 1980s was the D 216/217 "Austria-Express" ( from Klagenfurt via Graz/Krefeld to Amsterdam) between Krefeld central station (Hauptbahnhof Hbf.) and Arnhem, the Netherlands. The units with electric heating modifications (030 to 032) were used for this service.

The last scheduled working of the 215 series was on the DB Regio Hessen trains, which ended in April 2003. Afterwards some were kept on standby for the DB Regio Rheinland Regionalbahn trains.

In June 2003 transfer of the sub-class 215.9 to DB AutoZug GmbH took place, many others having been sent previously to DB Cargo.

=== Class 215.9 ===
This class were specifically used for the AutoZug (car ferry trains) between Niebüll and Westerland operated by DB AutoZug. The Class 215.9s work around the Sylt island ended in March 2008. Afterwards some were transferred for work around Chemnitz.
