= DB Class 218 =

Diesel-hydraulic locomotives class

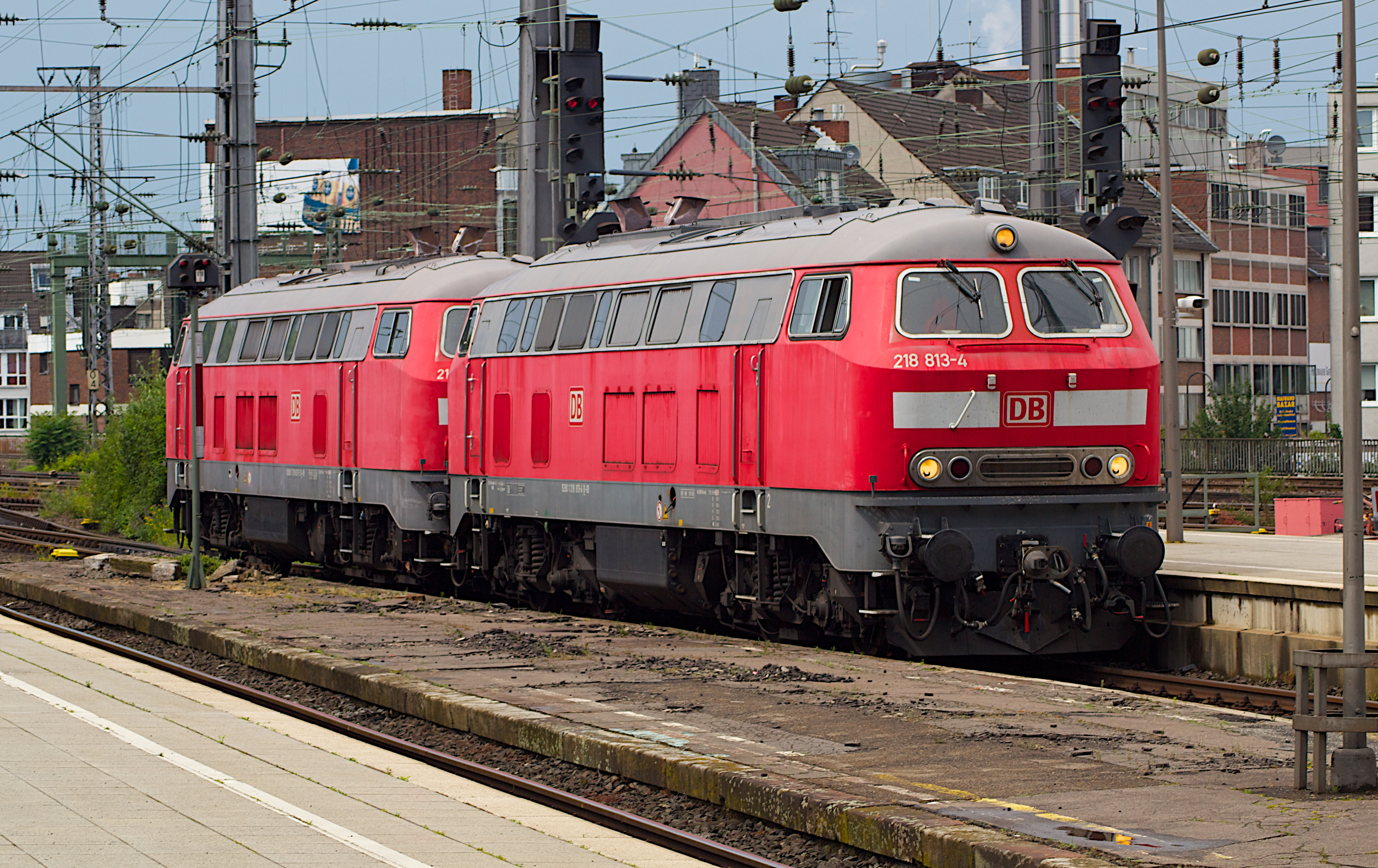
- A pair of Class 218s at Köln Hbf, 2013.
Type and origin
- Power type: Diesel-hydraulic
- Builder: Krupp, Henschel, Krauss-Maffei, MaK
- Serial number: 218 001-012; 218 101–499; 218 901-908 (converted DB Class 210)
- Build date: 1968; 1971-1979
- Total produced: 12 prototypes 398 main production 1 as 218 399 rebuilt from 215 112
Specifications
- Configuration
  - UIC: Bo′Bo′
- Gauge: 1,435 mm (4 ft 8 1/2 in)
- Length: 16.4 m (53 ft 9.7 in)
- Loco weight: ~79.5 t (78.2 long tons; 87.6 short tons)
- Fuel type: Diesel fuel
- Prime mover: As built: 218 001-012, 101-196, 242-288, 901-908: MTU 12V 956 TB 10 (of 1,840 kW or 2,470 hp); 218 198-241, 289-322, 340-426, 435-455, 463-484: MTU 12V 956 TB 11 (of 2,061 kW or 2,764 hp); 218 197, 323-339, 427-434, 456-462, 485-499: Pielstick 16PA 4V 200 (of 2061 kW)
- Engine type: Diesel
- Generator: 400 kW (540 hp) for HEP
- Cylinders: 12
- Transmission: Hydraulic (Voith 820 brs or MTU K 252 SUBB (with pielstick engines); Power transmission limit is 1487 kW
- MU working: with other classes of the V160 family, and other locos
- Loco brake: hydrodynamic brake KE-GPP2R-H mZ Air
- Train brakes: Air
- Safety systems: Sifa, PZB
Performance figures
- Maximum speed: 140 km/h (87 mph) / 90 km/h (56 mph)
- Power output: 1,840 kW (2,470 hp) (TB10 MTU); 2,061 kW (2,764 hp) (MTU TB11) (TB11 MTU); 1,986 kW (2,663 hp) (Pielstick)
- Tractive effort: starting : 235 kN (53,000 lb_{f})
Career
- Operators: DB, DB Railion

The DB Class 218 (before 1968 the DB Class V 164) are a class of 4-axle, diesel-hydraulic locomotives acquired by the Deutsche Bundesbahn for use on main and secondary lines for both passenger and freight trains.

The class represents the final major revision of the DB V 160 family of locomotives; having the preferred features of the antecedent locomotives, including a hydrodynamic brake, and a single engine providing electrical train heating via a generator as well as tractive power. The class were also the most numerous of the family, providing the backbone of the Deutsche Bundesbahn's main-line diesel locomotive traction from the 1970s up to the reunification of Germany.

Despite being displaced from many workings by DMUs, electrification, and inherited DR Class 130s, as of 2009 a significant number of the class still remain active throughout Germany.

== Background, history and design ==
The locomotives of series 218 were the last of the V 160 family to be developed; the main new feature was the use of a single engine to provide tractive power as well as electrical train heating when required (via an attached generator), the simplification over the two engined DB Class 217 was preferred, and was made possible by the availability of a higher powered (~1840 kW) engine compared to the original DB Class V 160 (~1400 kW).

In 1966 an initial twelve prototype locomotives were ordered from Krupp by the DB, for which the V 164 numbering was given, the main order came after the change to a 'computer compatible' UIC numbering scheme (See DB locomotive classification) which gave the number 218 as the reporting code for this class of locomotives.

The main series of 398 machines was produced between 1971 and 1979, by Krupp, Henschel, Krauss-Maffei and MaK. Additionally the engine DB 215 112, after being badly damaged in 1975 was repaired to Class 218 specification, and renumbered 218 399.

With a power of 2500 to 2800 hp and a top speed of 140 km/h, and the ability to work in multiple with related classes 215, 216, 217 and 218 as well as other classes, and coupled with electric heating and a low speed gear for heavier freight trains the locomotives became the main source of motive power in West Germany on both passenger and freight trains outside electrified sections.

The turn of the second millennium and the preceding few years saw a change from locomotive hauled trains to increasing use of 'diesel railcars' (or DMUs, diesel multiple units). This led to a reduction in the demand for these locomotives on passenger services, with many falling out of use, or only finding work pulling freight trains, nevertheless, in 2000 the locomotives were still in use on mainline long-distance trains.

By January 2008 there were approximately 220 copies still active.

=== Technical information ===
The design of the series as fundamentally the same as the rest of the V 160 family: all four axles are driven via cardan shafts by a Voith (Note: The Pielstick engined variants have a MTU K252SUBB transmission.) two speed hydraulic transmission which in turn is driven by a diesel engine, fuel and oil are located between the bogies under the main frame, on either side of the centrally located transmission, there are two cabs (which have slightly different windows). Externally the machines are very similar to the other members of the class, being of the longer variant at 16.4 m.

The tractive and braking forces are transmitted to the main mass of the locomotive via transverse beams attached to the main longitudinal supporting beams, the superstructure is made from sheet steel, forming a shell.

The framework supported on coil springs on the bogies, from 218 299 onwards flexicoil suspension was used, per bogie side and from the bogies.

There are two walkways connecting the cabins inside the body.

==== Engines ====
Over time, several diesel engines have been used as propulsion; the first series received the MA MTU 12V 956 TB10 with 2,500 hp (1,900 kW)

Because of the available power at rail being reduced when operating at full electric heating power some machines were fitted with a French 16 Pielstick PA4 V200 engine with around 2,700 horsepower (2,000 kW) built under license by KHD. (Note: The additional power is not available at rail when electric heating power is not used due to other components (e.g. the hydraulic transmission) limiting the maximum amount of tractive power transmitted.)

MTU developed from the TB10 engine a TB11 with greater power of 2,800 hp (2,100 kW) which was fitted to more than half the class.

With the introduction of more stringent emission requirements, as well as the original engines being badly worn, or in an attempt to improve efficiency, a number of upgrades have been investigated or fitted, including:

- TB11 engines fitted with emission reducing kit.
- Electronic engine management fitted to TB11 engines.
- Testing of entirely new engines, leading to:
  - Procurement of numerous 16 V R40/41 MTU engines as replacements
  - 4 locomotives fitted with Caterpillar Inc engines

Following the upgrades most of the class have either emission-improved TB11 engines or MTU 4000 engines.

Since 1985, the locomotives have had additional engine exhaust devices fitted on the roof with a scoop like appearance – the purpose of these is to direct the exhaust flow, preventing overhead wire being coated by any particulate or condensed emissions. The 'scoops' also increase the exhaust flow speed, by reducing the diameter of the exhaust - thus launching the combusted vapours higher in the air, and reducing the likelihood of passengers being coated with engine smoke.

==== Electrical equipment ====
The Indusi safety system is usually a Lorenz Indusi I-60. The original 36-pin inter-unit electrical connectors allows double traction control, auto door locking when not at a standstill, and can transmit driver announcements when attached to a passenger train, in addition to equipment for passenger information systems.

Originally the electrical power from the generator for the carriages was controlled with a simple Cycloconverter, later GTO Thyristor controlled supply circuits that had an intermediate DC circuit were used to create the AC carriage supply. (see Inverter)

==== Liveries ====
The first locomotives were delivered in the usual 'crimson' (RAL 3004) of that time. In 1974 218 217 and 218 218 were used as test vehicles for new colour schemes : 218 218 was the first locomotive in the new ocean blue-beige (turquoise/cream) finish (RAL 5020/RAL 1001). 218 217 received an experimental livery in the TEE red and beige (RAL 1001/RAL 3004).

The turquoise/cream colour became a new standard for the 218, whilst the 218 217 in the burgundy and beige remained a loner, for almost thirty years, until 753 001 (ex 217 001) became the second locomotive from the V160 family to receive this colour scheme.

By the late 2000s the turquoise/cream colour had virtually disappeared, the last representative being DB AutoZug 218 320.

In 1984 for the City-Bahn railway on the Cologne - Gummersbach ten locomotives were painted in pure orange (RAL 2004) with a grey stripe, after the project ended they retained the livery until the 1990s when they received the orientrot scheme of the 'oriental red' color (RAL 3031) with a white markings, the last 218 135 being repainted in 1996

The remaining Class 218 locomotives are almost entirely in the current traffic-red (RAL 3020) colour scheme.

As an oddity 218 473 was, for four years from April 2005 onwards, painted in a dark blue "King Ludwig" livery, sponsored by model train manufacturer Märklin. (Note: In honour of Ludwig II of Bavaria's favourite colour)

== Variants ==
A number of locomotives have been rebuilt and/or reclassified due to changing requirements:

=== DB Class 218.9 ===
The DB Class 218.9 resulted from the Deutsche Bundesbahn's flirtation with diesel locomotives boosted by gas turbine engines in the 1970s. Problems with gas turbine engine lifespan, and reduced fuel efficiency, coupled with two turbine failures resulted in the small class of eight Class 210 machines being rebuilt as class 218.9 at the beginning of the 1980s. This subclass was number 218-901 to 218-908. They were decommissioned and scrapped between 2004 and 2006.

=== DB AG Series 210.4 ===
A second set of locomotives designated Class 210 was created by the Deutsche Bahn AG in 1996 for the inter-city line from Munich via Berlin to Hamburg with non powered driving trailers, on which the original Class 120 was used.

Between the stations of Nauen and 'Berlin Zoological Gardens' the route was only partially electrified; in this electrification gap the train (complete with a DB Class 120 E-Lok) was towed by the diesels.

In 1996 the machines for this task were created from locomotives 218 430 to 434 and 218 456 to 462 which were stationed in Lübeck and were in particularly good condition. For this task the locomotives needed to be approved for running at 160 km/h (the same maximum speed at which the original Class 210 had run). The original hydraulic transmission was rated in its upper gear to 160 km/h, but the drive shafts needed to be uprated for the increased speed.. The individual locomotive numbers were preserved - thus DB 218 430 became DB 210 430.

Following the full electrification of the line the locomotives returned to normal stock duties, in December 1998 the locomotives were rebuilt again and became Class 218 machines once again.

=== DB AG Series 218.8 ===
15 locomotives were converted (in Bremen) for towing and shunting tasks - being fitted with a Scharfenberg coupler for modern coaching stock, they are used on the S-Bahn networks; found in all the major railway stations.

218 228 is found in the S-Bahn area of Frankfurt, 218 191 in the S-Bahn around Stuttgart, others at Darmstadt and Plochingen (218 191).

Some of this sub-class were equipped for towing ICE trains, and used in multiple on the new (rebuilt) lines of Cologne-Rhine Main and Nuremberg-Ingolstadt.

These 15 locomotives are based at the locomotive depots at Frankfurt/Main (nine locomotives) and Berlin-Rummelsburg (six locomotives).

=== DB AG Series 225.8 ===
Class 215 and Class 218 locomotives transferred to DB Railion for freight work were renumbered as Class 225, with the Class 218 locomotives forming the sub-series 225.8.

== Operations ==
The Class 218 was a successful design made with the most modern and sophisticated components that were available in 1968. With a relatively high speed of 140 km/h, the locomotives proved useful on TEE Bavaria, and with n-wagons with which they operated well past the year 2000.

Furthermore, after the dissolution of the GDR, and the merging of the two German railway systems they proved useful again on non-electrified sections of the former Deutsche Reichsbahn, however in the former West Germany some intercity services began to be operated by the DB Class 232 and 234 locomotives.

The locomotives were stationed in the depots of Regensburg, Stendal, Lübeck, Brunswick, Ulm, Hagen, Mühldorf, Karlsruhe, Rostock Hbf, Kempten, Halting and Kaiserslautern.

In 2000 there were 415 active machines, at this time also began the first decommissioning of machines that were found to be in a bad state of repair on their scheduled inspections. At this time DBAG began to economise its fleet:

- The locomotives with serial numbers 101 to 399 were to be kept until 2003, but then be either retired, transferred for internal use, or sold to DB AutoZug.
- The 218.4 locomotives capable of push pull operation were to be used with double decker passenger coaches.
- The prototypes locomotives were reclassified as Class 225.8 and transferred to DB Cargo for freight use.
- The 218.8 sub-class modified for towing ICE trains remained in service.

In March 2008 there were 235 active machines, or about 60% of the total Serienloks.

== Gallery ==
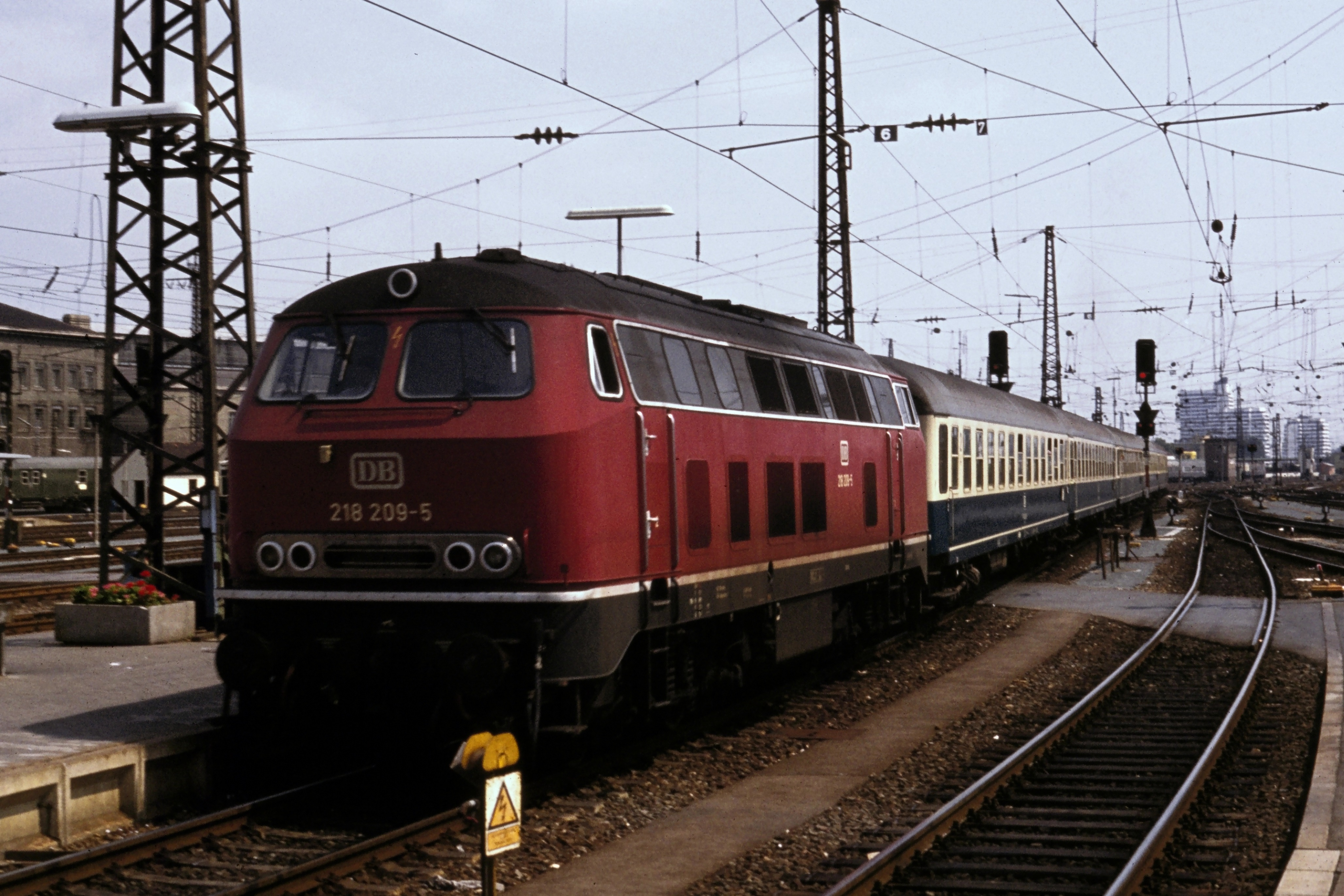

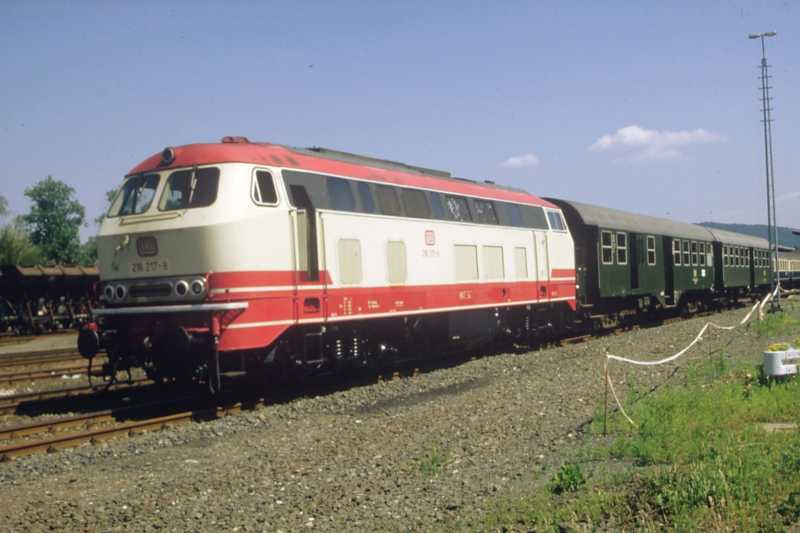

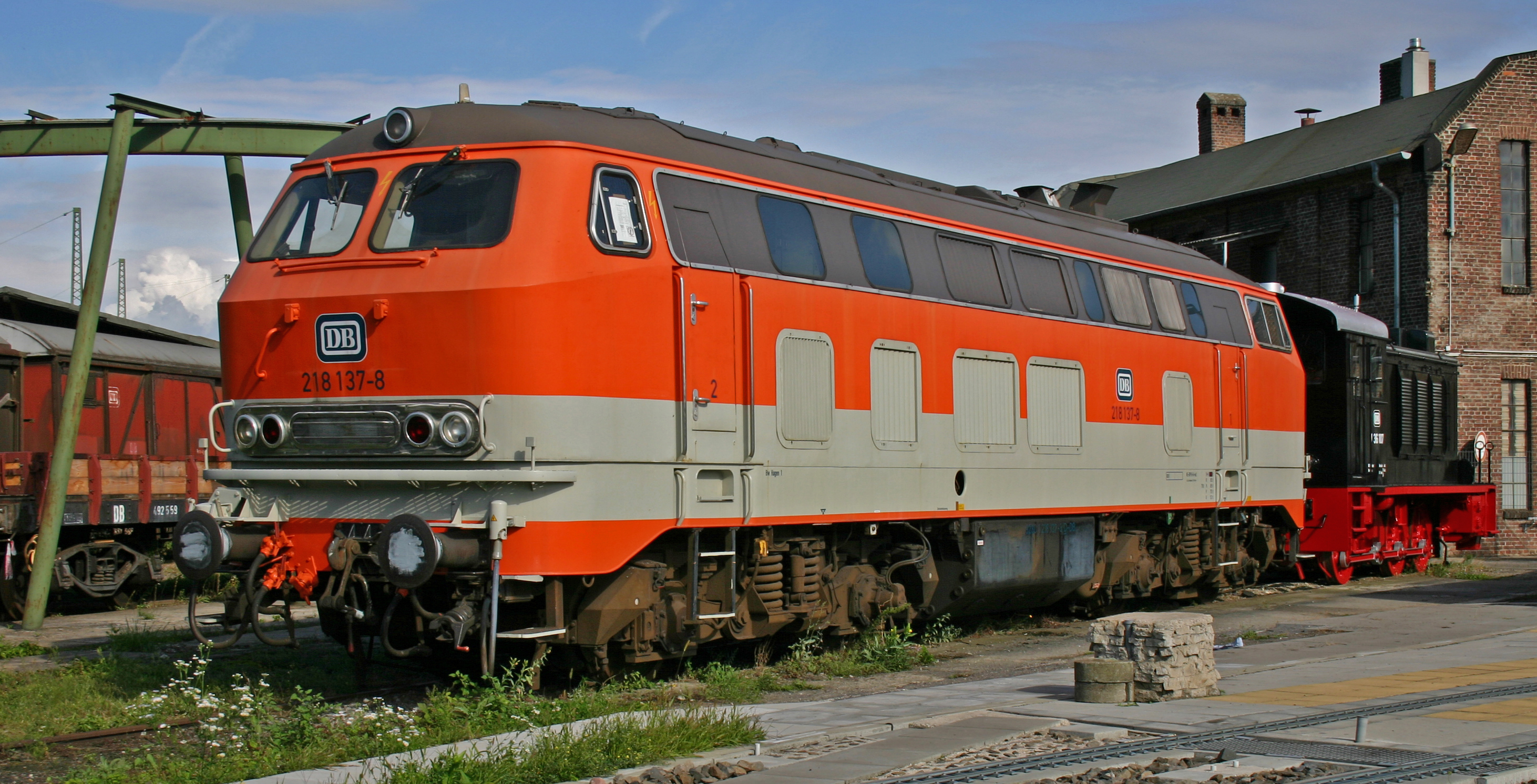

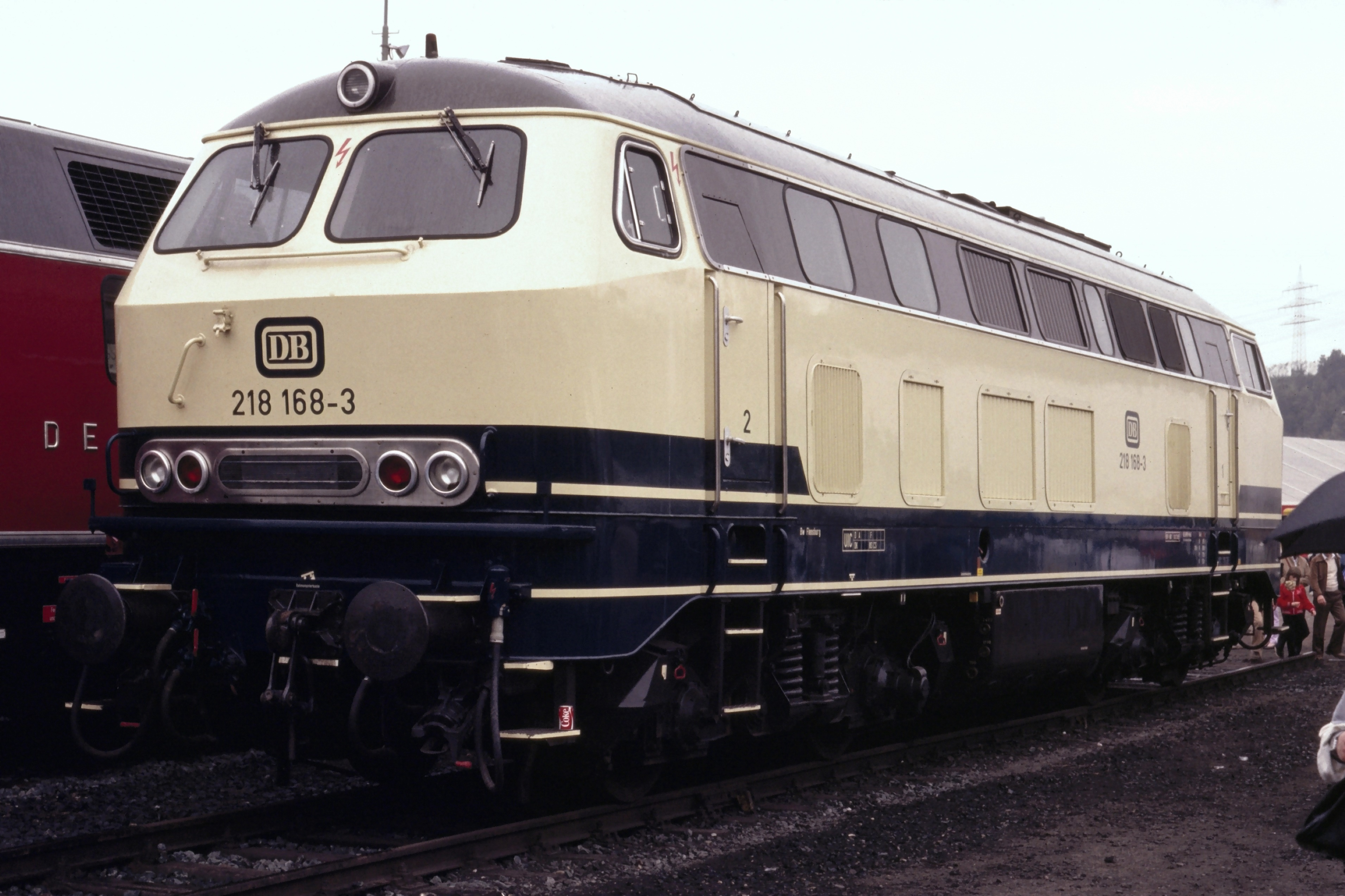

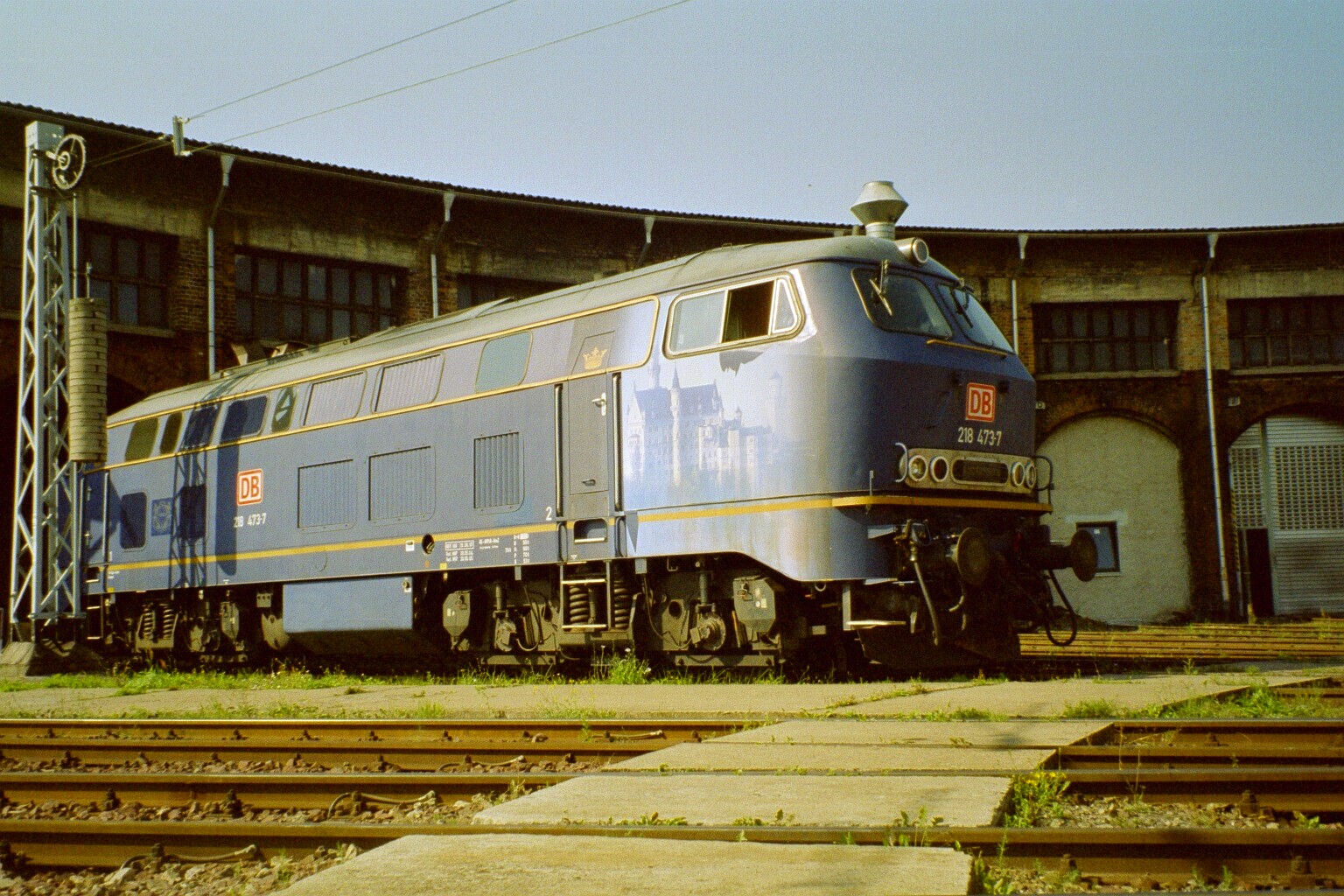

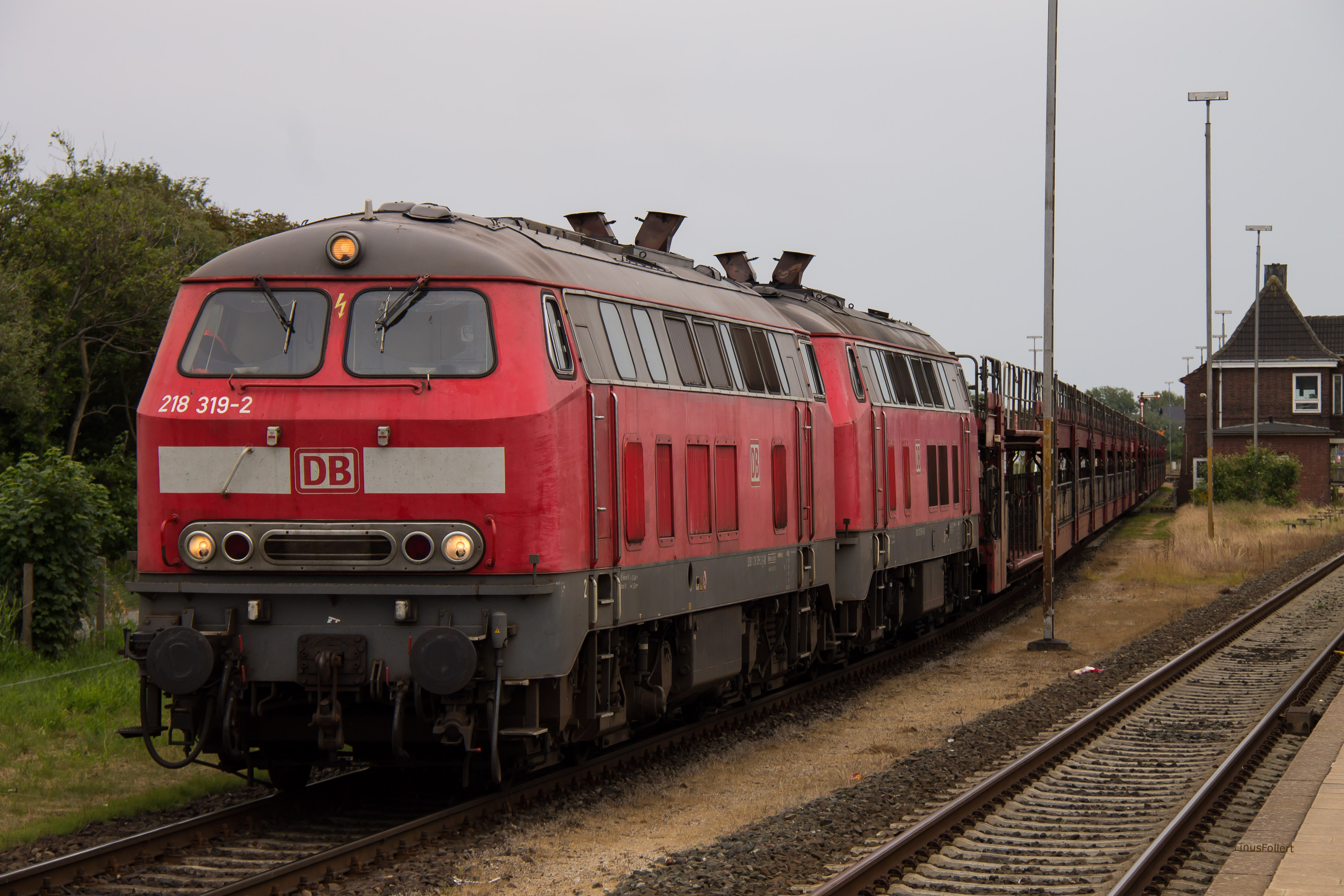

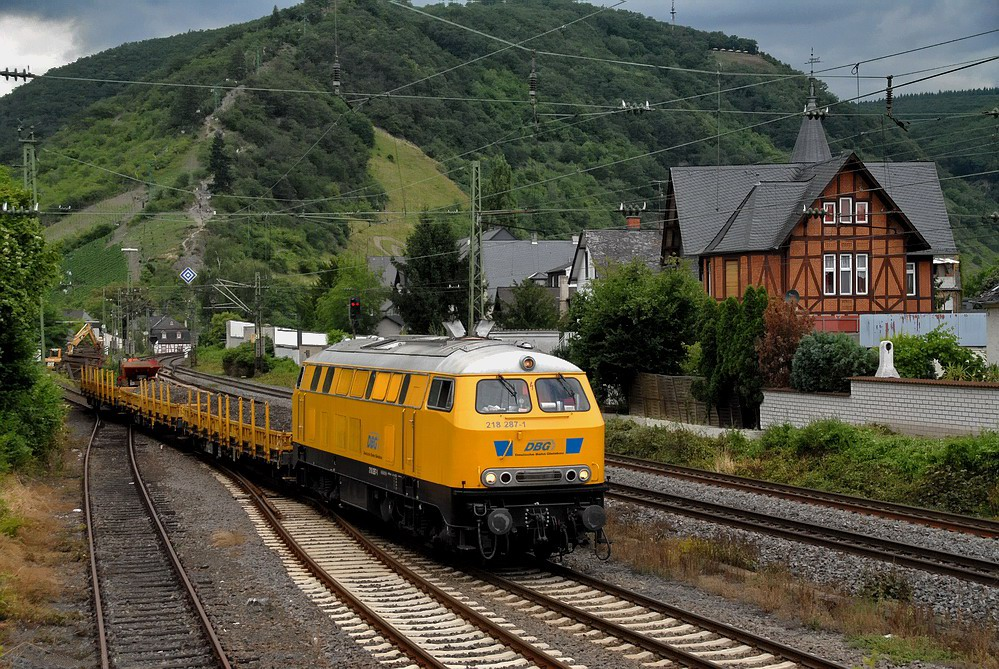

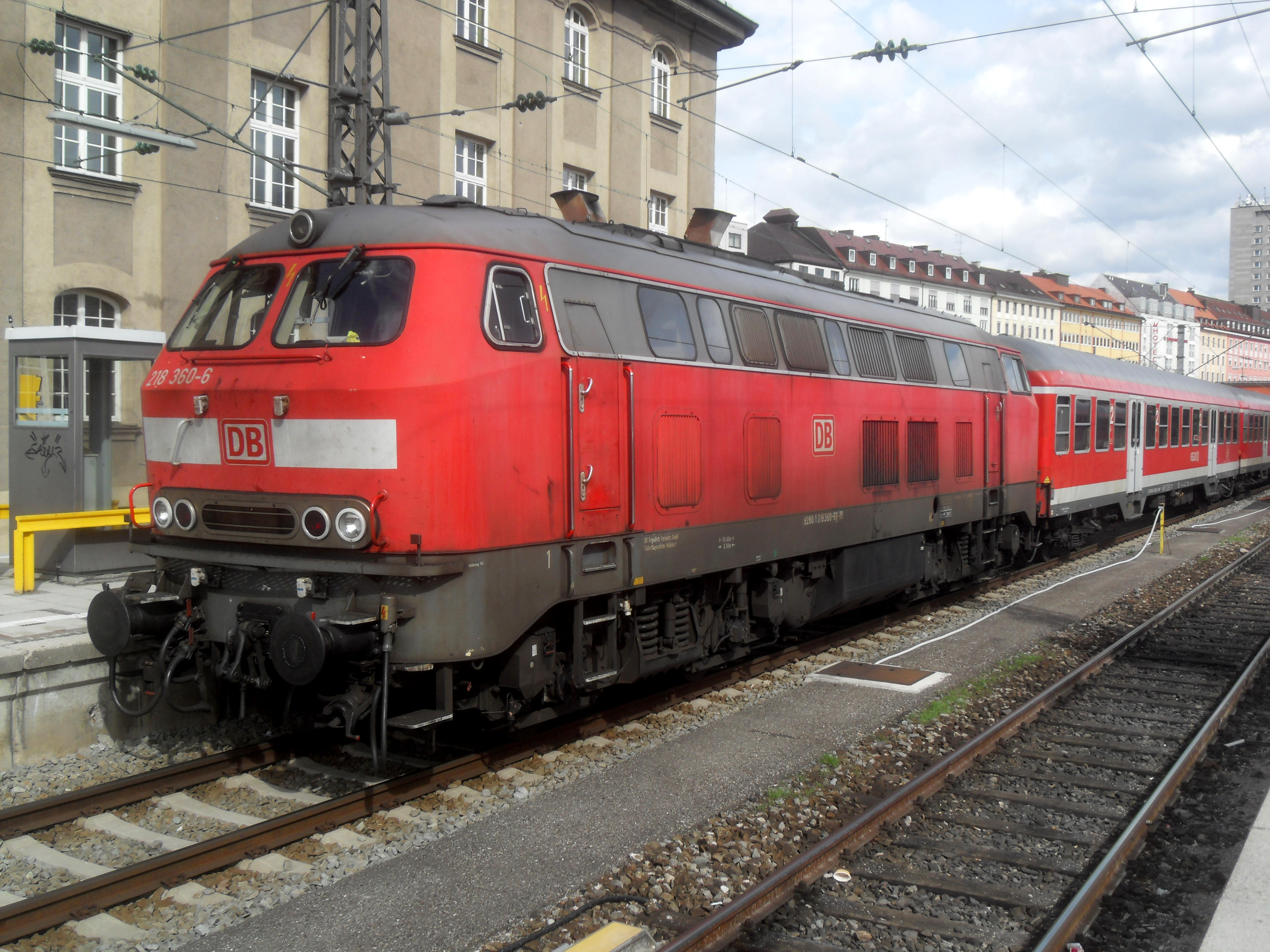

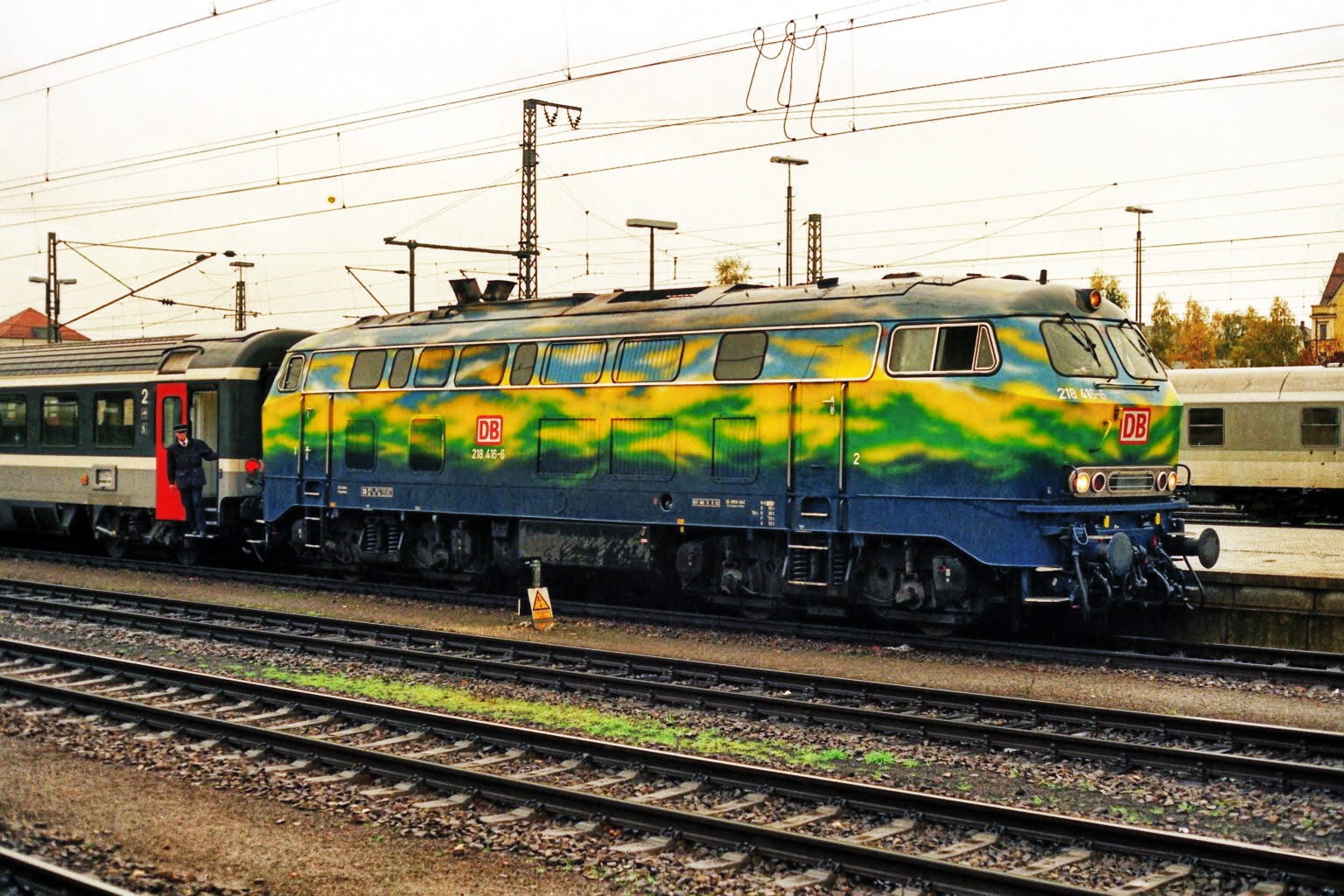

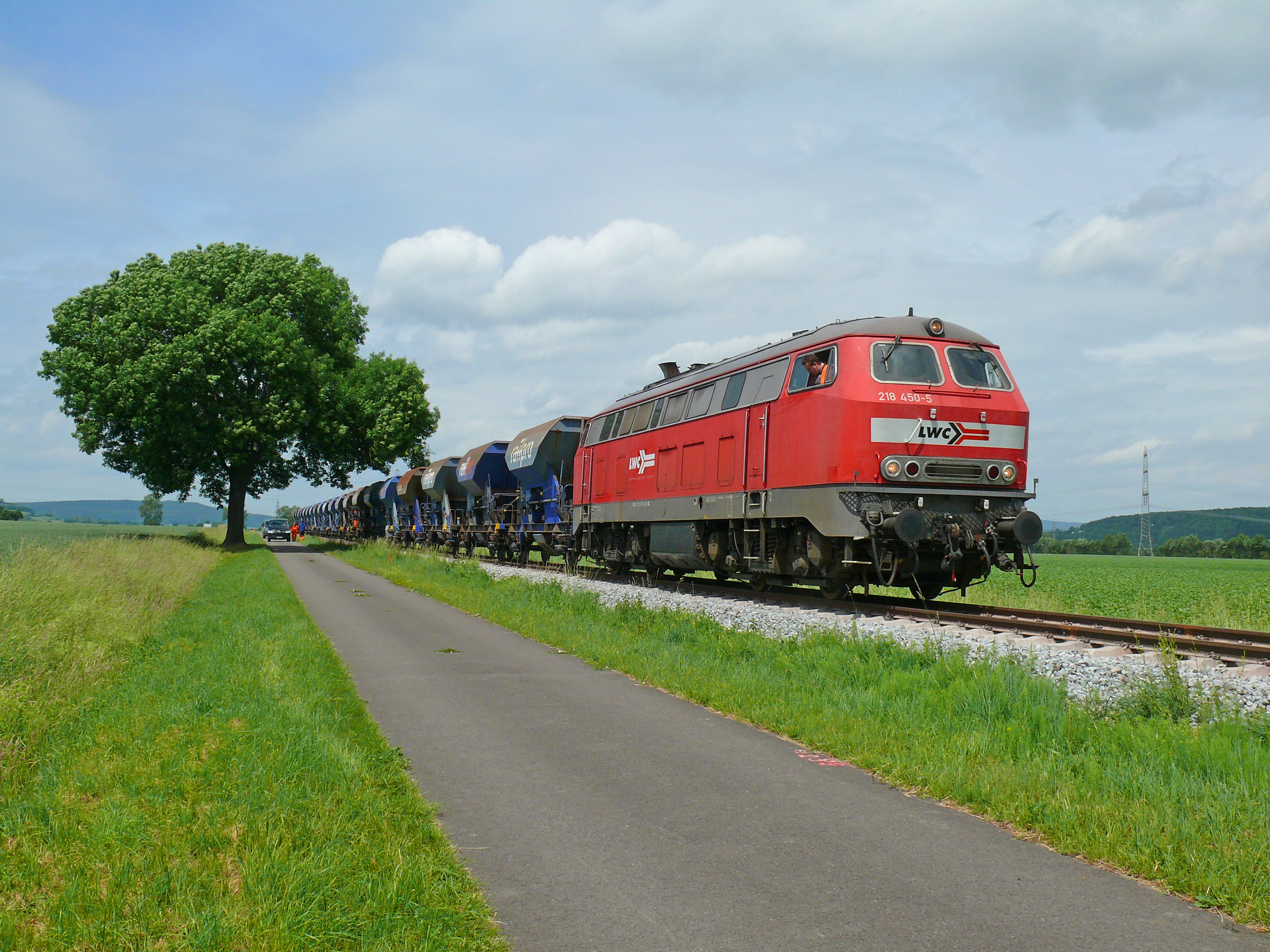

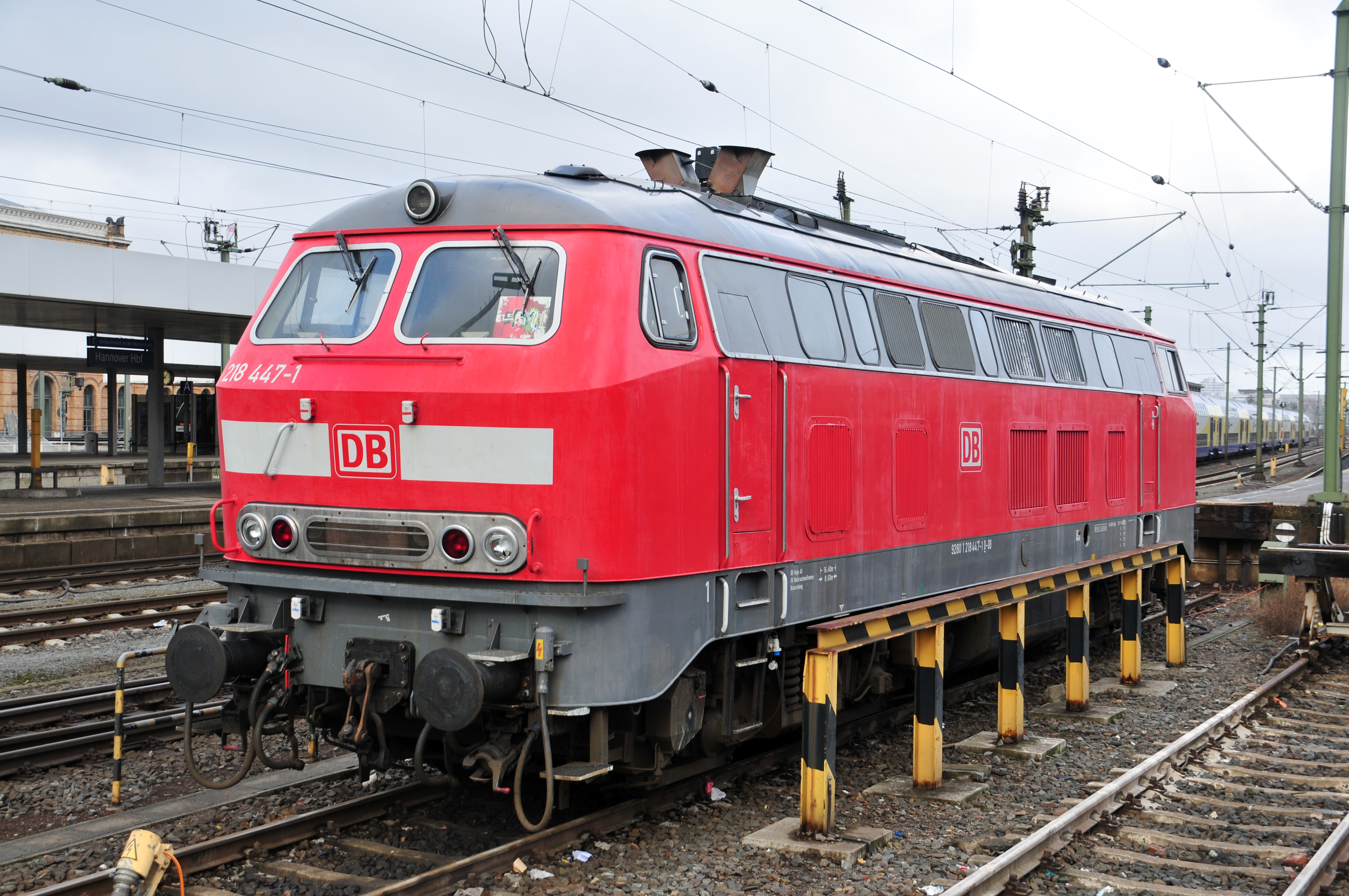

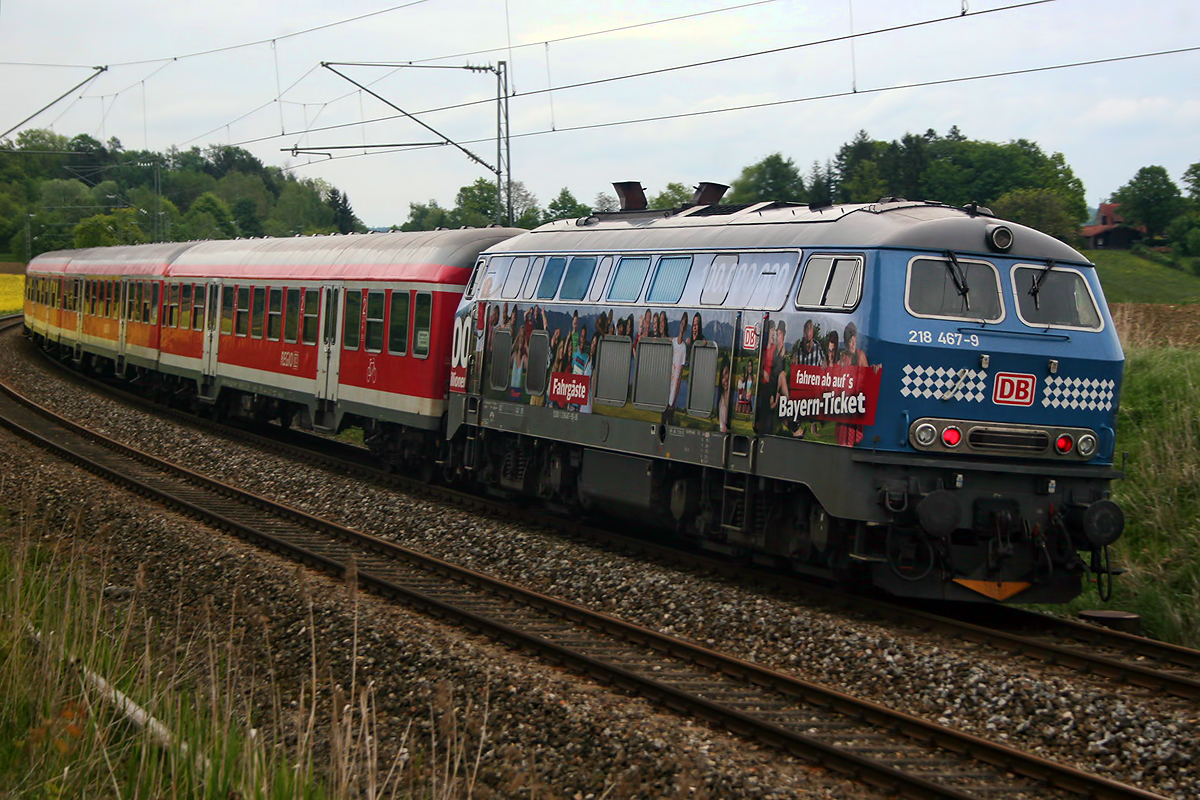

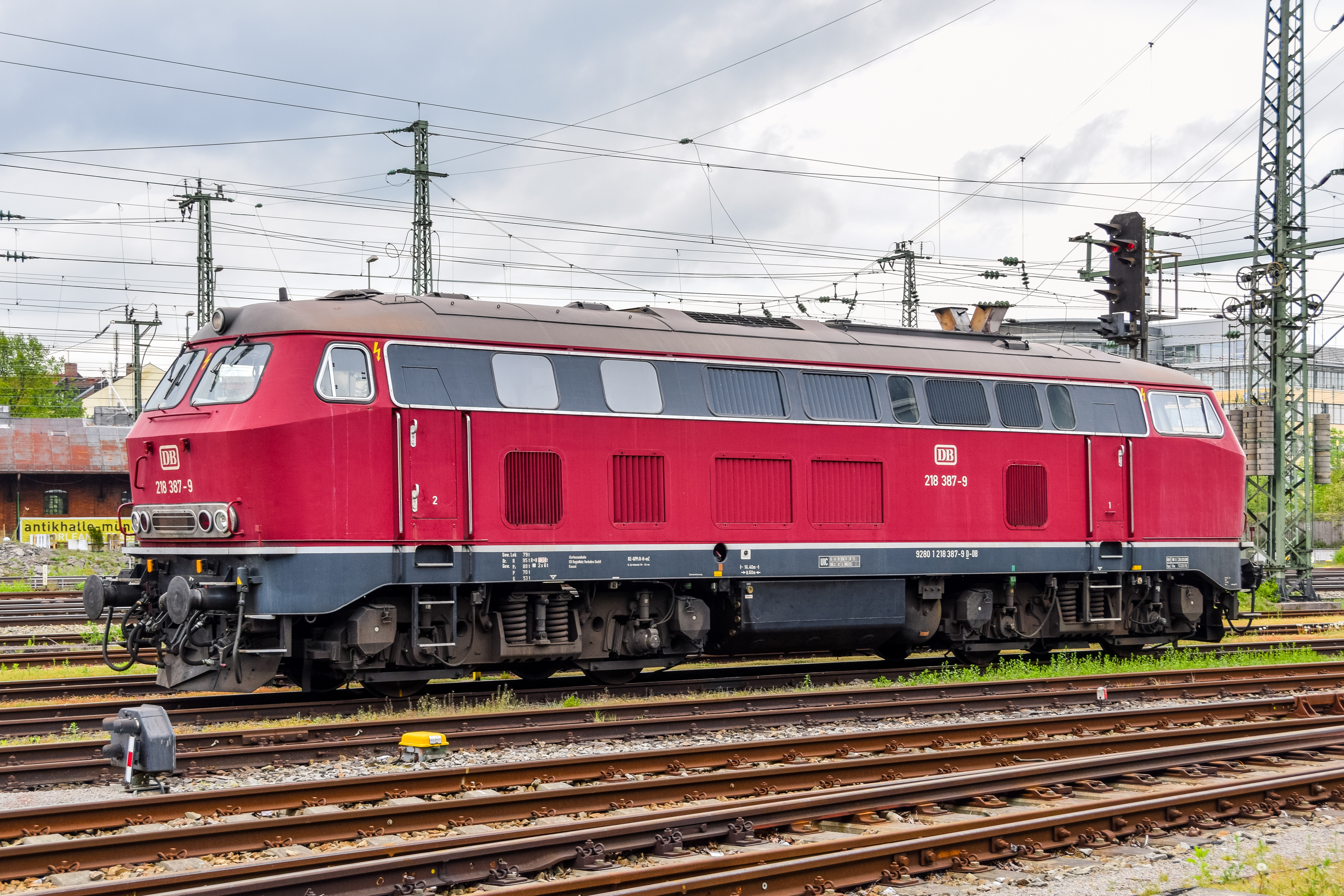

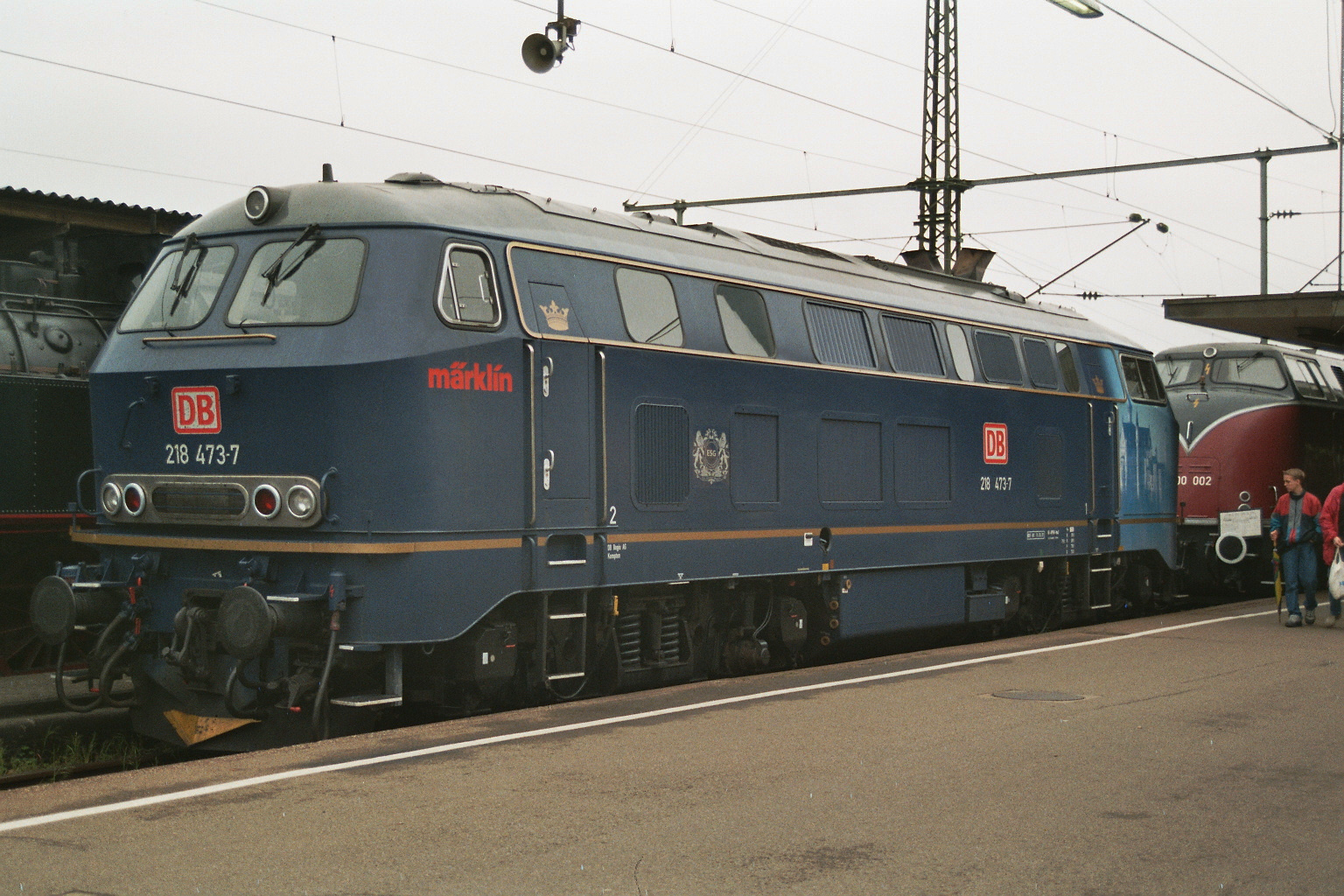

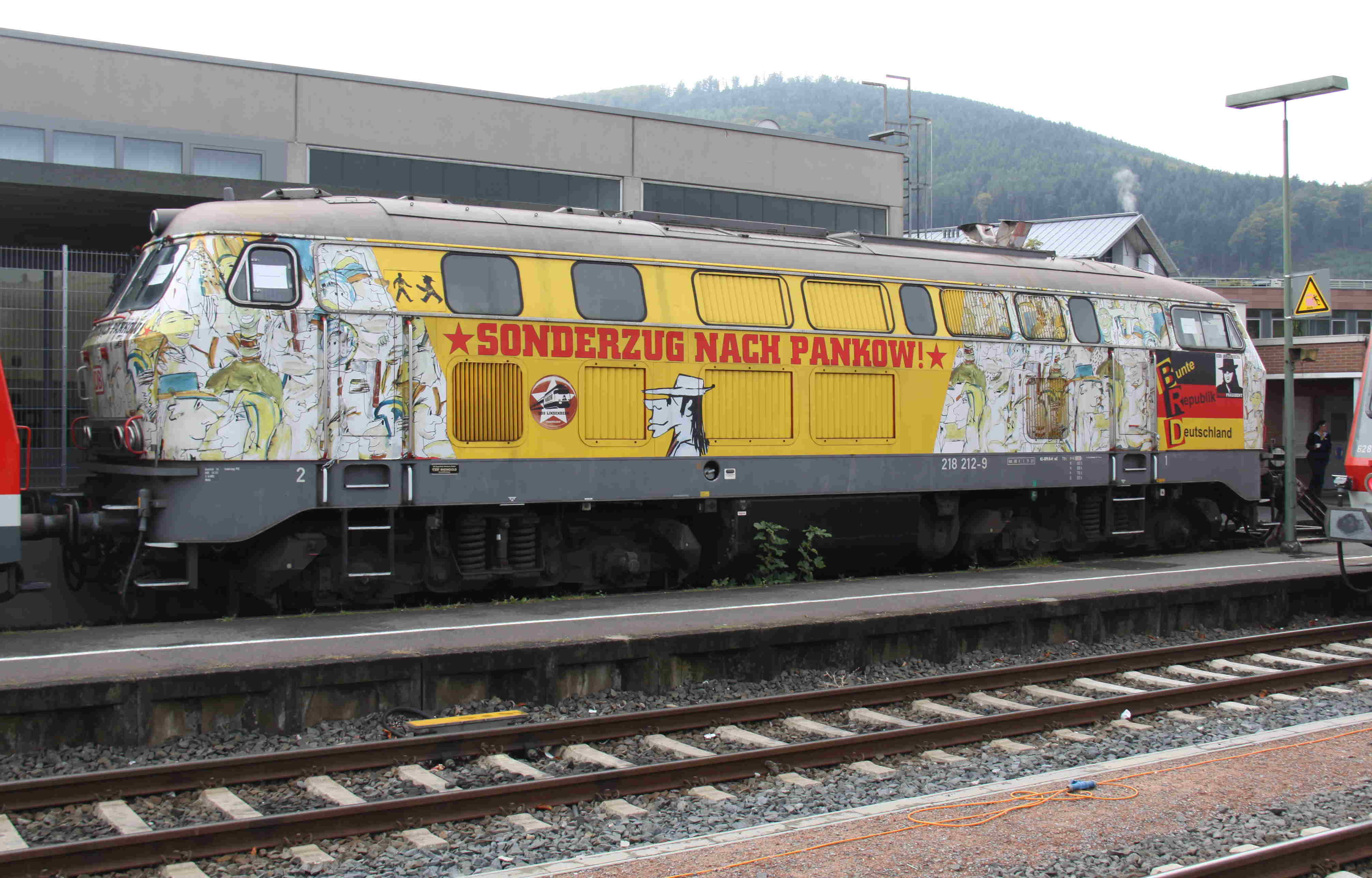
