= DBAG Class 225 =

Diesel-hydraulic locomotives

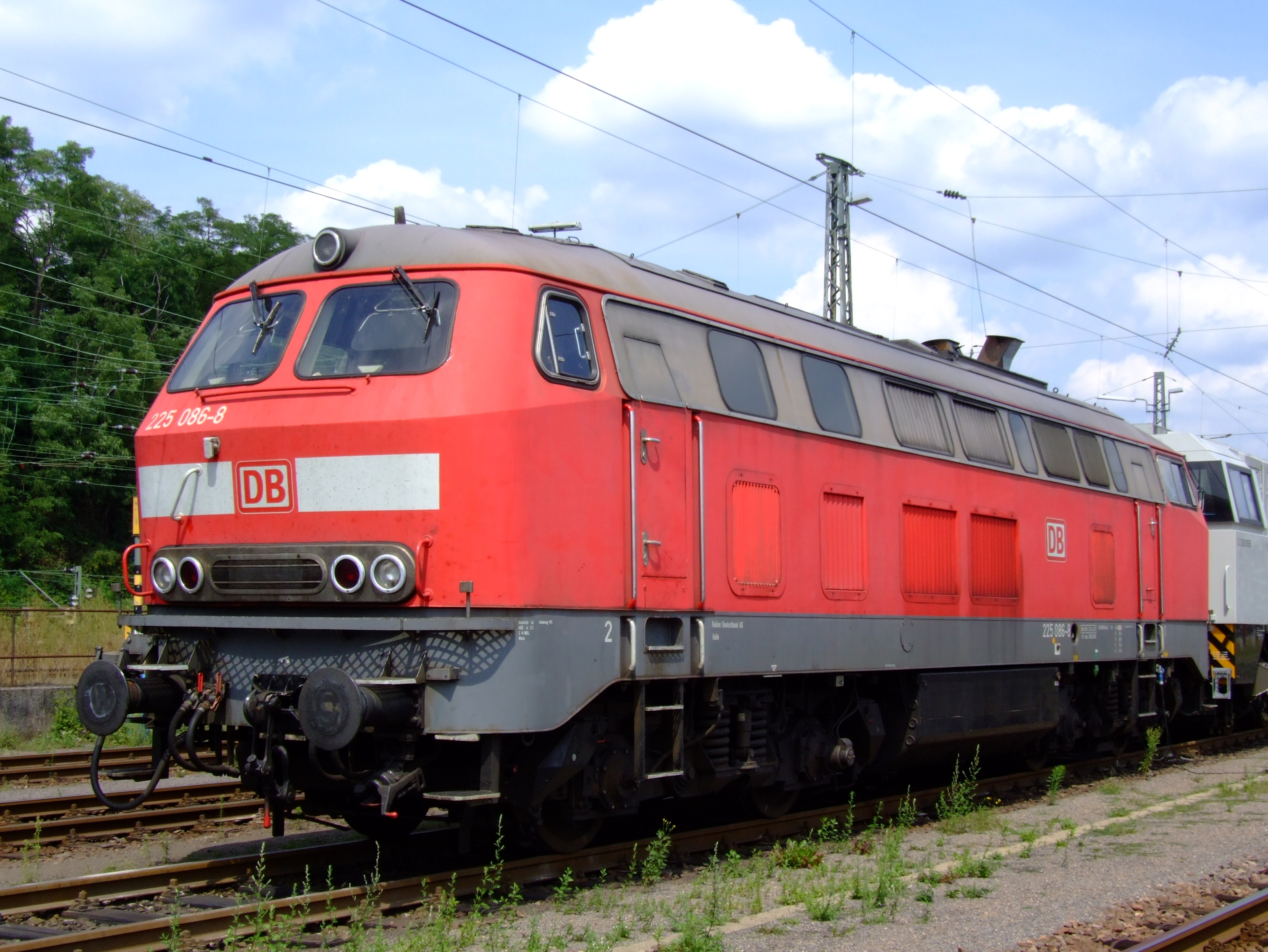
Type and origin
- Power type: Diesel-Hydraulic
Specifications
- Configuration
  - UIC: B′B′
- Gauge: 1,435 mm (4 ft 8 1/2 in)
- Loco weight: 79.0 t (77.8 long tons; 87.1 short tons) (with 2/3 supplies)
- Fuel type: Diesel
- Fuel capacity: 3,050 L (670 imp gal; 810 US gal) (fuel); 690 L (150 imp gal; 180 US gal) (heating oil)
- Water cap.: 2,850 L (630 imp gal; 750 US gal)
- Sandbox cap.: 320 kg (710 lb)
- Engine type: V12 Diesel
- Cylinders: 12
- Transmission: Voith, Torque converter
- Loco brake: Hydrodynamic brake, Air
- Train brakes: Air
- Safety systems: ETCS
Performance figures
- Maximum speed: 140 km/h (87 mph)
- Power output: 1,320 and 1,840 kW (1,770 and 2,470 hp)
Career
- Operators: Deutsche Bahn
- Class: 225 001–225 150 (with gaps) and 225 802–225 811

The DBAG Class 225 are a set of related 4 axle diesel hydraulic locomotives from the DB V 160 family. The series does not represent a new build, but a reclassification and/or rebuilding of 1960s and 1970s locomotives of Class 215 and 218 units.

The class were transferred to DB Cargo for freight only operations. The individual details of the members are as the locomotive classes they were derived from, excluding any modifications undertaking for the conversion to non-passenger work.

== Background, history and design modifications ==
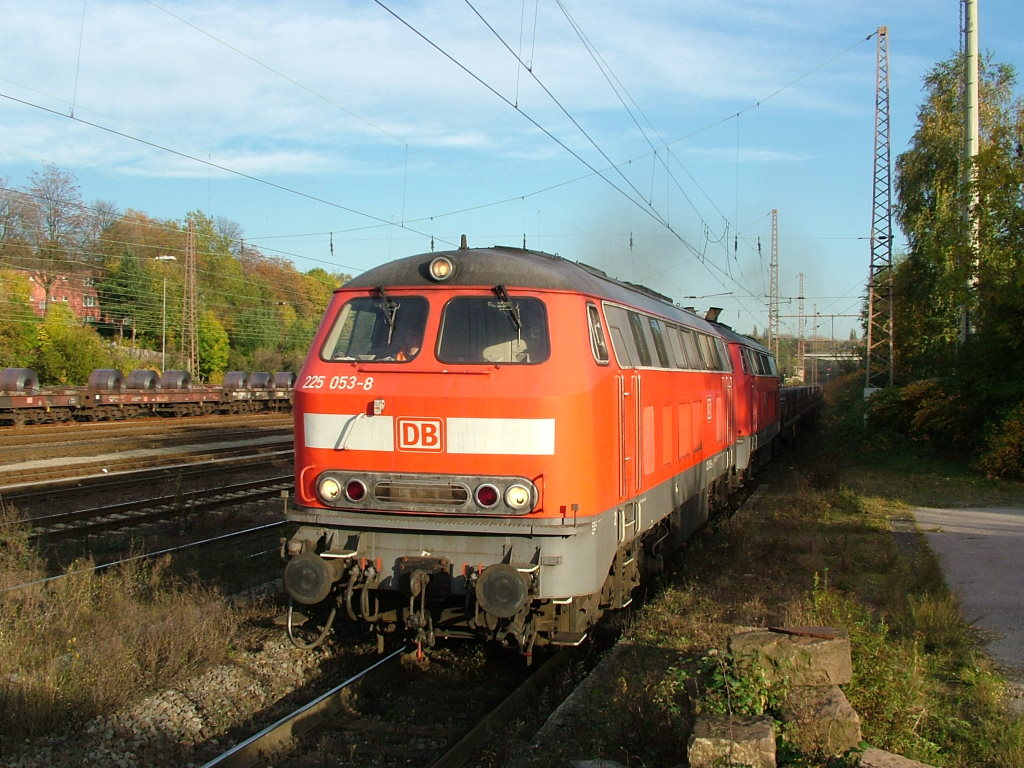
Two DB Class 225 locos (225 053 and an unknown no.), former class 215, with a steel train at Bochum Nord, summer 2005

After passenger work for many of the DB Class 215 disappeared, DB Regio transferred 68 locomotives to DB Cargo (later Railion) for freight work.

From 2001 onwards the units underwent conversion to Class 225. Later, between 2003 and 2005, another six engines, prototypes of the DB Class 218, were transferred and converted to Class 225.8.

The steam heating was removed since it was no longer needed; instead, a heater for pre-heating the engine machinery was installed. A large part of them went into service still unmodified, the removal of the steam boiler taking place later concurrently with scheduled overhauls.

All of the class have multiple working control, allowing pairings to be formed with both DB Class 217 and DB Class 218 (for example, a pair consisting of a 217 and 225 class were often in use around Mühldorf).

There are differences between the individual class members; locomotives 225 001-004 and 225 802-811 lack a hydrodynamic brake. The locomotives 215 030 to 215 032 also were transferred to this class. The auxiliary generator in these special examples was not removed.

The top speed for this class is limited to 130 km/h. Their central depot is in Leipzig, locomotives in use work from the depots of Giessen, Gremberg, Kornwestheim, Mainz-Bischofsheim, Mühldorf and Oberhausen-Osterfeld.

As of June 2008 the locomotives have been partially phased out, but there are still about 50 machines operating in active service. A complete phasing out of the locomotives is not currently (2015) planned since the remainders are still in use.
