= City-Bahn =

German train category

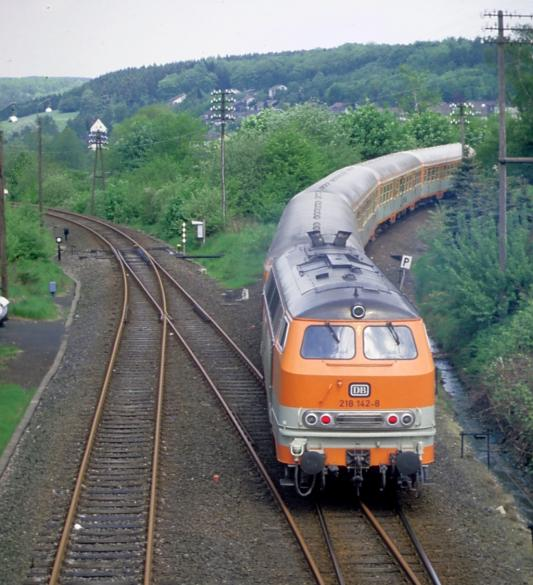
DB Class 218 with a City-Bahn train

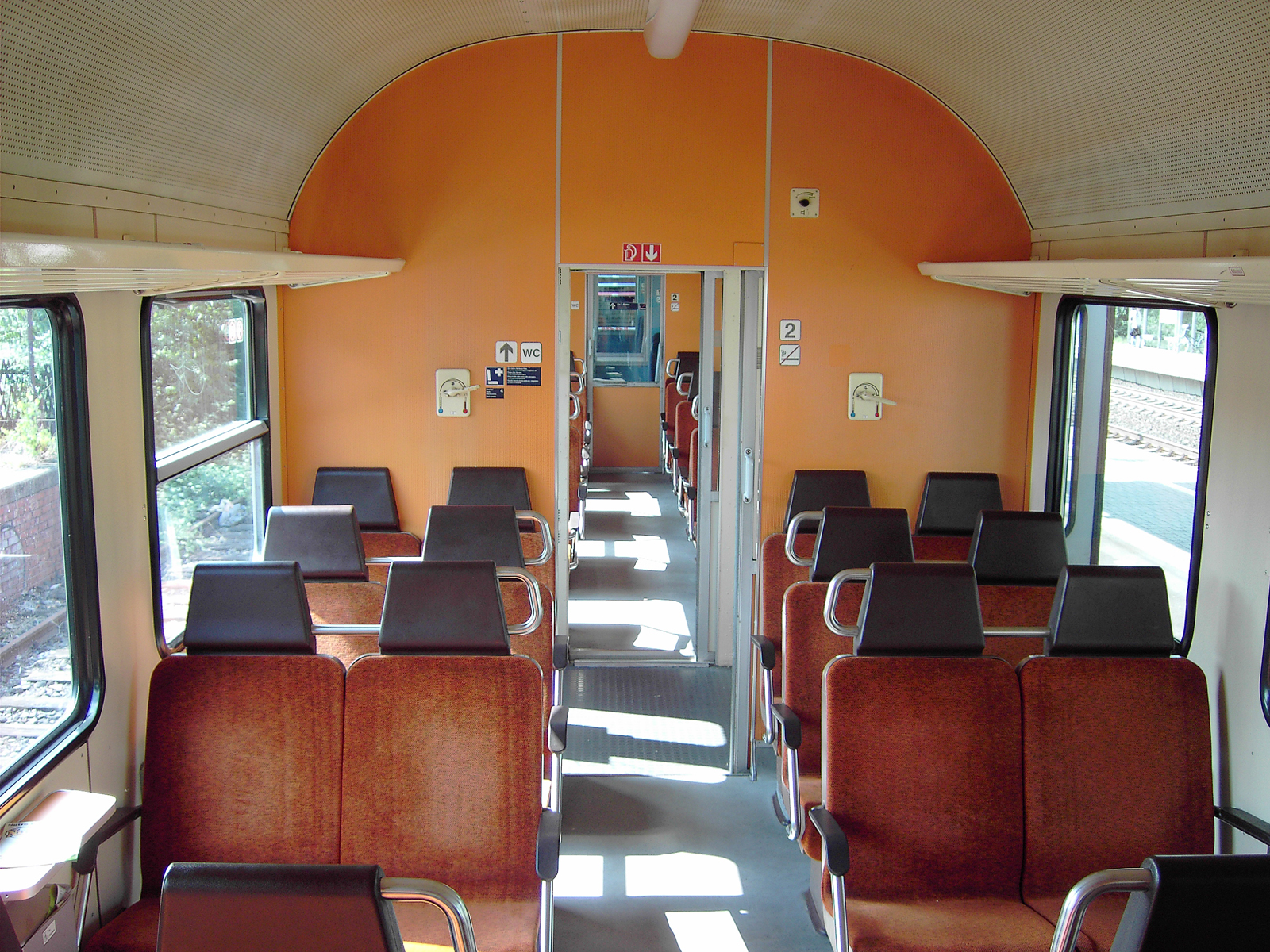
Converted interior of a City-Bahn coach with mixed seating

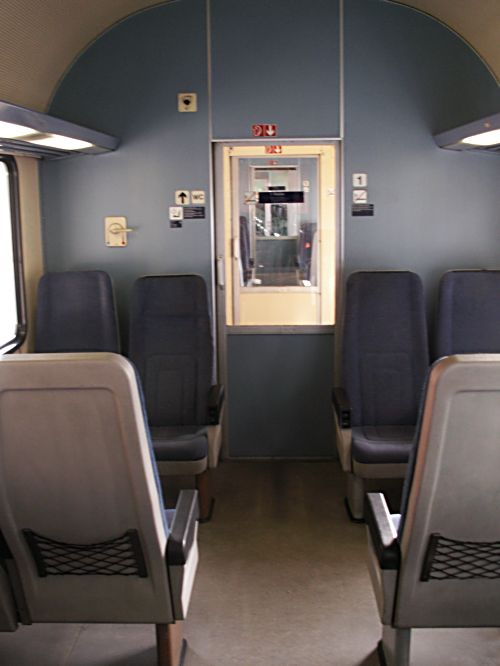
1st class compartment

The City-Bahn (CB) was a German train category introduced by the Deutsche Bundesbahn (DB) in 1984 for local train services, in order to make secondary routes more attractive. Old Silberling coaches were modernised and a more frequent fixed-interval service (Taktfahrplan) introduced. As its use spread the DB changed the way it was written to CityBahn. The City-Bahn was replaced by the Stadt-Express.

== Routes ==
One of the services was the Cologne–Overath–Gummersbach line, which was opened in 1984 as the Aggertaler on the Agger Valley Railway (Aggertalbahn, KBS 459). For experimental services on the closure-threatened line, Silberling coaches were converted to the then modern interiors of the VT 628.2 and, like the Rhine-Ruhr S-Bahn, painted in orange and light grey livery. A café was also part of the redesign. The trains were hauled by similarly painted locomotives of Class 218. The modernised rolling stock and the fixed hourly services led to a considerable increase in passengers. From 1985 the new City-Bahn rakes ran from Cologne to Gummersbach, and sometimes onwards via Marienheide to Meinerzhagen; however this only lasted until May 1986, then they only went as far as Marienheide, and from May 1987 only to Gummersbach again.

The second City-Bahn route was the Lower Elbe Railway (Niederelbebahn), where trains ran between Hamburg and Stade. Because the line is electrified, Class 141 locomotives were employed.

In the same year City-Bahn trains were also deployed to the area of Hanover and from 1989 in the Saarland. However the specially converted Silberling coaches did not appear here until 1990.

In 1995 the City-Bahn services were renamed Stadt-Express, later Regionalbahn and RegionalExpress trains superseded the City-Bahn as a train type. In Hanover the Hanover S-Bahn had the honour of running City-Bahn services.

== Models ==
The German model train company Märklin has made a model of the "City-Bahn" line for a limited series in 2009. The road number for the engine is BR 218 143-6, and is item number 39182. Additional Silberling passenger cars are also made under item numbers 43808 (3 car set), and 43818 (add on car for 43808 and 39182).

== See also ==
- Train categories in Europe

== Sources ==
de:City-Bahn (Zuggattung)
