= Stadt-Express =

The Stadt-Express (SE), formerly City-Bahn (CB), is a train category in Germany, that links conurbations with the outer reaches of the surrounding countryside. The name literally means "City Express".

Deutsche Bahn no longer offers Stadt-Express services, but the Rhein-Main-Verkehrsverbund tariff association still ordered them until December 2016. As a consequence, there were Stadt-Express lines in the RMV-area, but they were categorized by the Deutsche Bahn as either Regionalbahn or Regional-Express.

Stadt-Express lines were renamed to Regionalbahn or Regional-Express or were discontinued. The last remaining one is running from Leipzig to Saalfeld/Saale operated by Abellio Rail Mitteldeutschland.

== Concept ==
The Stadt-Express has the role of linking cities to those areas outside their immediate surroundings; it therefore stops at every station in the outlying region. However, in the 'core' area of the conurbation, served by other local passenger trains like the S-Bahn and Regionalbahn trains, it runs faster, like a Regional-Express, and therefore only stops at the most important stations.

While there are no more Stadt-Express services in Germany, several Regionalbahn or Regionalexpress services still follow the concept: For example, the RE 22 (Eifel-Express) stops from Cologne Messe/Deutz to Kall only at important stations, thereafter it stops at every station on the way to Gerolstein, like a Regionalbahn train, a service not provided on this section of the line. After Gerolstein it changes its designation to "RB 22" and runs officially as a Regionalbahn to Trier.

Not all Stadt-Express routes followed this concept exactly; several services stopped at all stations even in the core area.

The Stadt-Express category was classified as a local service (Nahverkehr) and therefore could be used without supplementary fare.

Due to the general refurbishment of the Riedbahn, which connects Mannheim and Frankfurt with a high-speed rail line, from 15 July to 14 December 2024, the Regional Express services RE4 and RE14 were temporarily converted to SE14.

== See also ==
- City-Bahn
- Train categories in Europe

== Sources ==
- de:Stadt-Express
