= DB Class V 162 =

Type of locomotive

DB Class V 162 DB Class 217
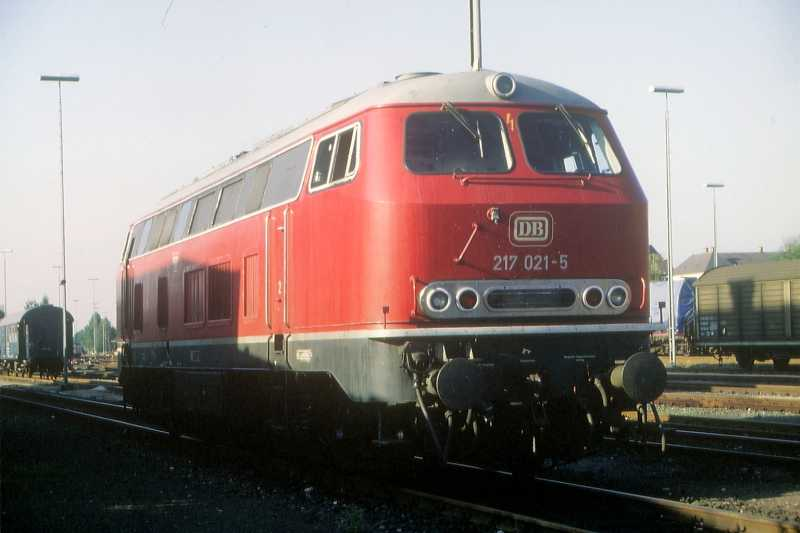
- 217 021 at Bw Weiden
Type and origin
- Power type: Diesel-hydraulic
- Builder: Krupp, BBC : V 162 001; Krupp, AEG : V 162 002; Krupp, Siemens V 162 003; Krupp: Main series
- Serial number: prototypes : V 162 001 to V 162 003 (later 217 001-003); 217 011–022
- Build date: V 162 001-002 : 1965; V 162 003 : 1966; V 162 011-022 1968
- Total produced: 15
Specifications
- Configuration
  - UIC: Bo′Bo′
- Gauge: 1,435 mm (4 ft 8 1/2 in)
- Length: 16.4 m (53 ft 9.7 in)
- Loco weight: V 162 001 / 217 001 / 753 001 : 79.0 t (77.8 long tons; 87.1 short tons); V 162 002 / 217 002 / 753 002 : 80t V 162 003 / 217 003 : 81t V 162 011 to V 162 022 : 79.0 t (77.8 long tons; 87.1 short tons) (@ 2/3 full tanks)
- Fuel capacity: V 162 001 / 217 001 / 753 001 : 3,100 L (680 imp gal; 820 US gal); V 162 002 / 217 002 / 753 002 : 2,800 L (620 imp gal; 740 US gal); V 162 003 / 217 003 : 2,700 L (590 imp gal; 710 US gal) all others : 3,150 L (690 imp gal; 830 US gal)
- Prime mover: Main MTU : 16 V 652 TB 10 except V 162 003 : MTU 16 V 652 TY 10 auxiliary : MAN SEMAN D3650 HM3U
- Cylinders: 12
- Transmission: Voith hydraulic L820 also K 252 SUEW (MTU gearbox)
- Loco brake: pneumatic disc also hydrodynamic brake in Class 753
- Train brakes: pneumatic
- Safety systems: ETCS
Performance figures
- Maximum speed: Slow gear : 100 km/h (62 mph); Fast gear 120 km/h (75 mph) (prototype V 162 003); 130 km/h (81 mph) (main series); 140 km/h (87 mph) after 1971 - disc brake fitted machines
- Power output: Main engine : 1,427 kW (1,914 hp); Auxiliary engine : 386 kW (518 hp)
- Tractive effort: starting : 236 kN (53,000 lb_{f})
Career
- Operators: Deutsche Bundesbahn, followed by Deutsche Bahn AG, and subsidiaries.
- Current owner: DB Schenker

The DB Class V 162 (after 1968 named DB Class 217) is a class of four-axle diesel hydraulic locomotive built as a development of the DB Class V 160 for the Deutsche Bundesbahn from 1965 to 1968.

This variant has a separate diesel engine providing auxiliary power and for electric train heating, replacing the steam generator in the original V 160.

The locomotives continued to be used after the formation of the Deutsche Bahn AG in 1994; the final DB Schenker unit was withdrawn in December 1997.

Two of the prototypes of the class operated as internal locomotives and were for a time classified as DB Class 753.

== Background ==
In the early 1960s, the then German Federal Railways (Deutsche Bundesbahn or DB) and the German railway industry developed the V 160 series (with which this class shares the majority of its design features), a diesel locomotive for use on medium-duty passenger and freight trains on main and secondary lines. These locomotives had steam heating apparatus for passenger coaches, but could not power electrically heated stock. Therefore, with the increasing use in the future of electrically heated coaches, co-commitment with the increasing electrification of the system it was necessary to produce a variant with a method of electrical power generation.

== Design and production ==
=== Prototypes ===
In 1963, Krupp AG was requested to develop a V160 variant with electric train heating which would have the classification code V 162. In 1965 two prototypes V 162 001 and V 162 002 were produced, and a third V 162 003 made in 1966.

Each had a MTU-built (then Maybach) 16-cylinder engine of the type 16V652 TB10 producing 1,940 hp (1,450 kW) which was entirely used for traction. Since in the mid-1960s a more powerful engine was not available, the electrical supply was powered by an auxiliary diesel engine. The inclusion of two engines in turn meant that the overall length of the machine was increased by 0.4 m in comparison to the V 160, making a total length over buffers of 16.4 meters.

The auxiliary engine used by Krupp was a 12-cylinder MAN D3650 HM3U engine developing 500 hp (370 kW) of power. Since DB required that the auxiliary power should be available for traction (for use on freight trains), the auxiliary engine was also connected to the transmission, meaning that the traction power could be increased to 1813 kW when necessary. The generators of the three prototypes were from different manufacturers: In the V 162 001 the supplier was BBC, in V 162 002, AEG and in V 162 003 Siemens supplied the electrical generator.

The three prototypes went into testing from 1965 to 1968, resulting in the Siemens generator (generating 310 kW for electrical heating) being chosen for the main production tranche.

=== Production locomotives ===
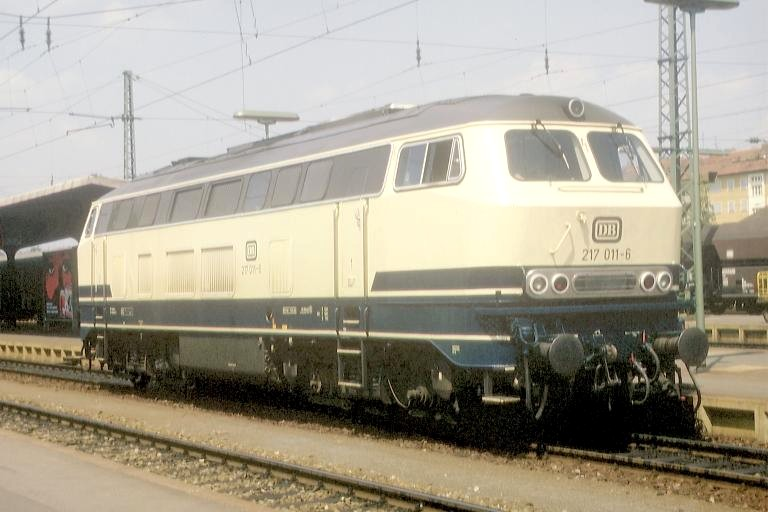
217 011

As the prototypes had proved successful, in 1967 construction of twelve locomotives began at Krupp. Since a new numbering scheme was introduced in 1968, the locomotives were given the numbers 217 011 to 217 022 (the prototypes being renumbered to 217 001 to 217 003).

In 1971, disc brakes were fitted to the locomotives (replacing the block brakes) leading to more effective braking and a consequential increase in the maximum operating speed limit by 20 km/h to 140 km/h.

Even though it was foreseeable that more of this class of locomotives could be built, in 1968 the first representatives of the Class 218 were built with a single diesel engine (of 2500 hp) providing traction and electrical heating power in one unit. Thus no more of this variant were made, since the single-engined variant presented a clear reduction in maintenance costs.

These vehicles had a distinctive exhaust system (with scoop like protuberances on the roof) fitted in 1993.

=== DB Class 753 ===
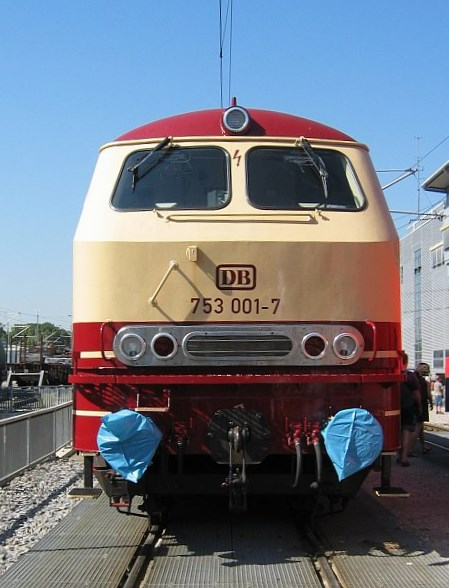
Departmental locomotive 753 001

In April 1989, the prototype locomotives 217 001 and 217 002 were transferred to work internal DB traffic; as such they were reclassified as 753 001 and 753 002. Both had, since 1974, often been used for test and measurement trains and in the testing of other locomotives as 'engine brakes'; the reclassification in 1989 was therefore purely formal. As part of the reclassification, rebuilding of these machines took place, including fitting of hydrodynamic brakes.

In the late 2000s, the two were reclassified back as Class 217s and returned to freight duties.

== Operational history and modifications ==
When the locomotives were introduced, the three prototypes were based at Mühldorf, six production locomotives were based at Regensburg, and the remaining six production locomotives were based at Hagen-Eckesey.

The three prototypes at Mühldorf and the six production locomotives at Hagen-Eckesey were transferred to Regensburg, in 1971 and 1972, respectively. They were used for pulling heavy freight trains.

In 1993, the Class 217 locomotives were put into trial use with double-decker passenger coaches on the line connecting Mühldorf and Munich. The Class 218 locomotives replaced them on the double decker trains and the Class 217s returned to Regensburg.

In 1998, the bahnreform of the Deutsche Bahn led to its division into different subsidiaries: the class were assigned to freight division and thus became the property of DB Cargo (since September 2003 renamed Railion Germany, and currently DB Schenker).

In 1999, 217 001 and 217 002 were transferred to the Technical Central Office in Munich for testing new trains.

In May 2000, all of the units (except DB 217 001) were assigned back to the engine shed at Mühldorf. They pull freight trains around their base in Mühldorf, often in multiple workings.

The last 217 (217 017) in use by DB Schenker was withdrawn on 19 December 2011 at Mühldorf Depot and it has been replaced by Euro 66 locomotives. There is a Class 217 (nr 217 014-0) on display at the DB Museum, Koblenz.

== See also ==
- DB Class V 160 family Overview of all related classes

== References and notes ==
=== Sources ===
- v160.de V 160 family site - brief introduction, detailed individual locomotive information, including historical photographs, builder, current status and work histories. Also more technical information on engine, transmission, fuel system and cab. v160.de
- Die homepage der Baureihe 217 History, Class 217 specific technical information, fleet list, information on Class 753, and other information.
