= DB AutoZug =

- Industry: Rail
- Defunct: 30 September 2013
- Headquarters: Dortmund, Germany
- Revenue: 202 Million Euro
- Number of employees: ~354 (2007)
- Parent: Deutsche Bahn AG
- Website: dbautozug.de

DB AutoZug GmbH was a German rail transport company that provided automobile (Motorail) and night passenger train services for Deutsche Bahn AG. It was based in Dortmund and was a wholly owned subsidiary of Deutsche Bahn AG. On 30 September 2013 the company was merged into DB AG's long-distance division DB Fernverkehr.

Night trains were operated with the sister company CityNightLine AG headquartered in Zurich, Switzerland; until CityNightLine AG merged with DB NachtZug. DB AutoZug GmbH and CityNightLine were subsidiaries of DB Fernverkehr AG which in turn was a wholly owned subsidiary of DB Mobility Logistics AG. DB AutoZug GmbH was also responsible for the car transporter trains from Niebüll - Westerland, known as the SyltShuttle, as well as the Schifffahrt und Inselbahn Wangeroogeshipping (Island railway of Wangerooge).

== History ==
The first car transported by rail in Germany was carried by the Deutsche Reichsbahn on 1 April 1930. At first only the rich and privileged could afford cars and the market was small. In the 1950s, Britain and France started to run car transporter trains. In the Summer of 1956, the first true car train in Germany ran, via Hamburg, Munich and also Ostend; the drivers travelled in a passenger car, whilst their automobile was carried by the same train. The German economic recovery in the 1960s brought an increase in travel and a corresponding increase in the number of cars transported, increasing eightfold to 80,000 by 1969, many holiday makers travelling to warmer more sunny parts of Europe. The numbers of cars transported peaked in 1973, at 185,550 vehicles; the oil crisis put an end to this growth. In 1978, the Bundesbahn cut back by 40% its number of terminals due to a lack of demand. The increase in car ownership in the 1980s did little to help the rail-car transporter business - changes in lifestyle meant that people often expected to drive their cars all the way to their holiday destination (which represented most of the car by rail business). Additionally, the seasonal nature of the business meant that buying new wagons was not profitable. In this decade the number of people flying over to a holiday overtook those travelling by rail. Also in this decade, the transport of caravans and boats also ceased. After the merger of the Deutsche Bundesbahn and the Deutsche Reichsbahn - in 1996 a new company was formed: DB AutoZug.

== Operations ==
Created in 1997 the DB brand AutoZug was responsible for the companies' private car transportation business. In 1999 the night trains of the Deutsche Bahn including the brands UrlaubsExpress and DB NachtZug also came under the company's control. From 2002, the organisation became DB AutoZug GmbH, and a company in its own right. From 1 January 2003 the Euro Night and D-night trains were the responsibility of DB AutoZug GmbH.

In December 2007 DB NachtZug and UrlaubsExpress were branded together under the new name CityNightLine. At the same time, the number of car-trains was reduced by around 1200 to approximately 920, and four of the nine terminals were closed. 2008 brought the procurement of new-car wagons to replace some of up to 40 years old. 2007, the company transported 183,000 vehicles and generated with a turnover of 60 million euros.

By the 2008 holiday season, further changes in service were made: the terminal in Troisdorf Germany closed, and services to Livorno (Italy), Fréjus (France) and Rijeka (Croatia) no longer in operation, however in Alessandria (Italy) a new terminal came into operation. For holiday travel by car, the market share of the company was less than 0.5 percent, 70% of the customers were regulars, a quarter were pensioners. Statistically, customers had an above average income as of 2008.

== Other services ==
DB AutoZug GmbH was also the controlling company for the SyltShuttle and the railway on the North Sea island of Wangerooge.

=== SyltShuttle ===
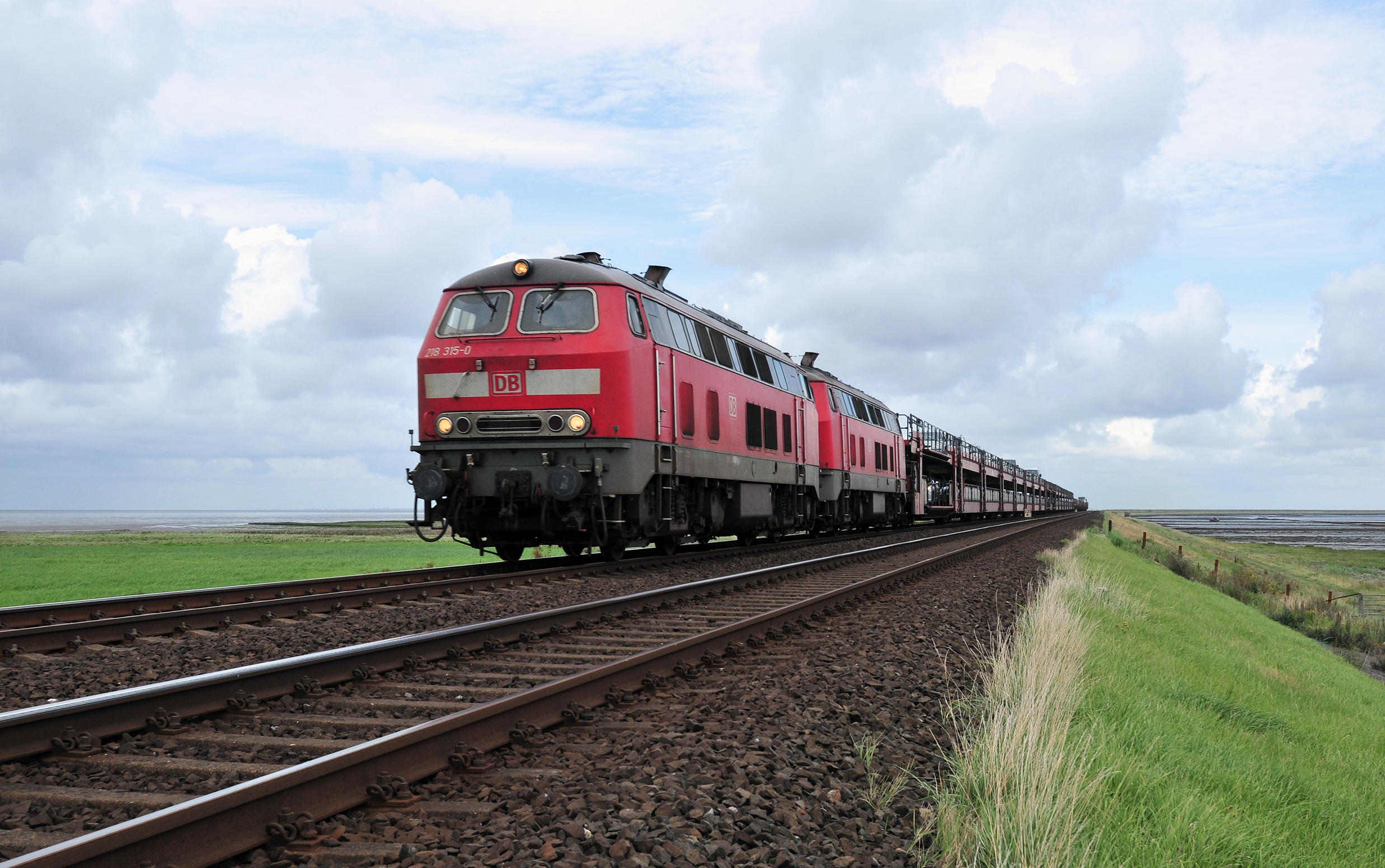
The SyltShuttle on the Hindenburgdamm causeway

The SyltShuttle is a car transporting service to the Island of Sylt which is connected to the mainland by the Hindenburgdamm causeway, a man made construction carrying rail tracks but no road link.

=== Night trains ===
Comprising the former UrlaubsExpress and DB NachtZug as well as EuroNight and D-Nacht services.

== DB Autozug terminals ==
=== Germany ===
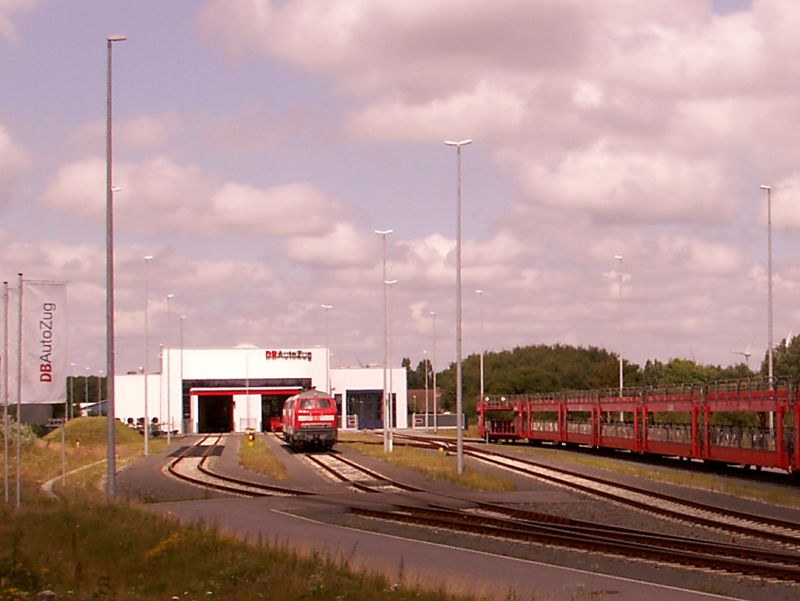
DB AutoZug terminal for 'SyltShuttle'

As of 2009 there are seven car/rail terminals in Germany

Location	State
Berlin-Wannsee	Berlin
Düsseldorf	North Rhine-Westphalia
Hamburg-Altona	Hamburg
Hildesheim	Lower Saxony
Lörrach	Baden-Württemberg
München Ost	Bavaria
Neu-Isenburg	Hesse

=== Rest of Europe ===
As of 2009 the European terminals were:

Country	Location
France	Narbonne
France	Avignon
Italy	Alessandria
Italy	Bolzano
Italy	Verona
Italy	Trieste
Austria	Innsbruck
Austria	Salzburg
Austria	Villach
Austria	Vienna; Service via ÖBB terminal

== See also ==
- Motorail
