= DB Class V 160 =

Class of German diesel-hydraulic locomotives

DB Class V 160 DB Class 216
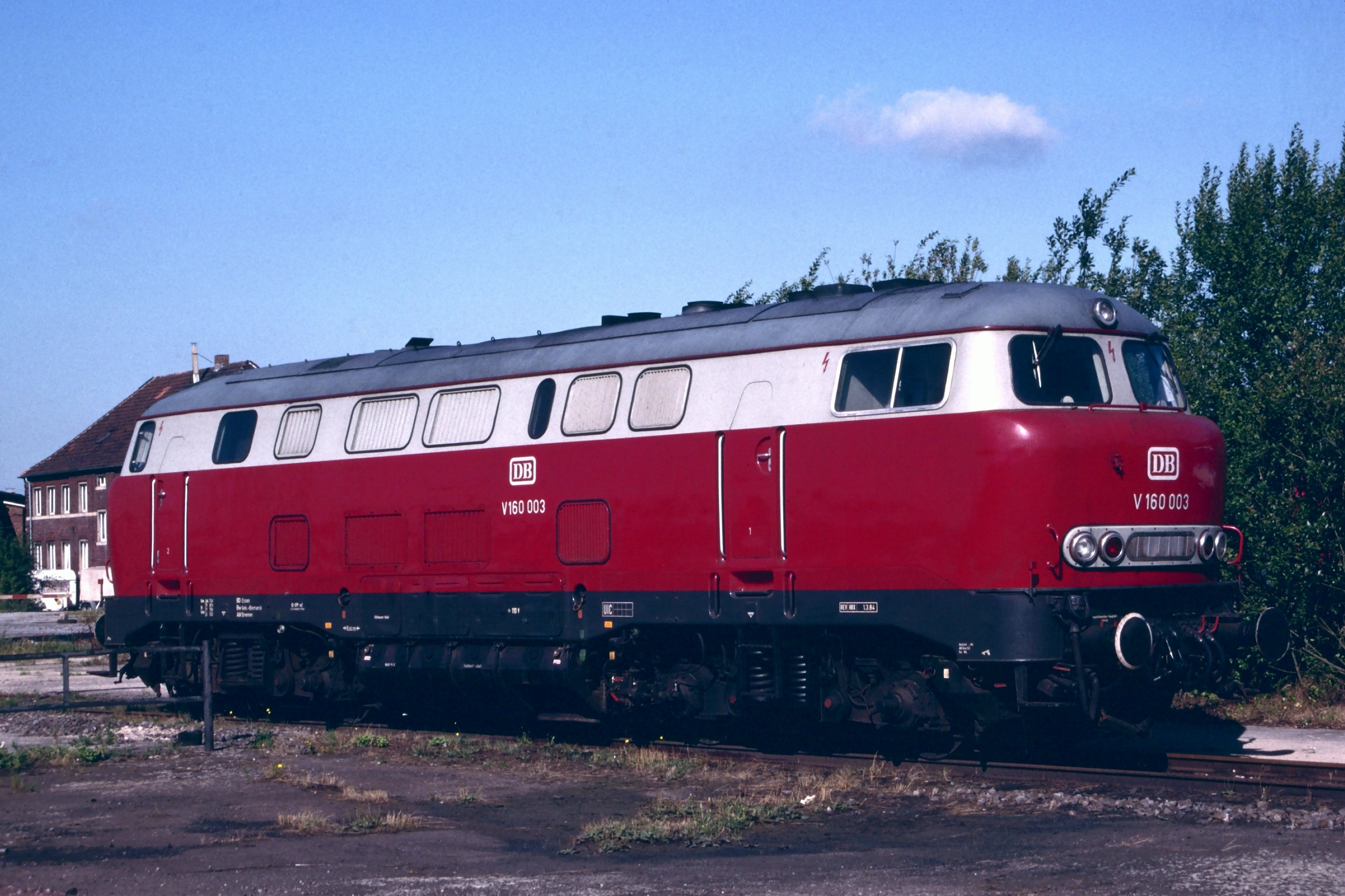
- Prototype form 'lollo' example DB 216 003
Type and origin
- Power type: diesel
- Builder: Krupp, KHD, Henschel, Krauss-Maffei, MaK
- Total produced: 224
Specifications
- Configuration
  - UIC: B′B′
- Gauge: 1,435 mm (4 ft 8 1/2 in) standard gauge
- Length: 16 m (52 ft 5 7/8 in)
- Loco weight: at 2/3 fuel and supply capacity : V 160 001 to 009 : 74 t (73 long tons; 82 short tons); V 160 010 to 224 : 76.7 tonnes (75.5 long tons; 84.5 short tons)
- Fuel capacity: V 160 001 to 009 : 3,000 L (660 imp gal; 790 US gal); V 160 010 to 224 : 2,700 L (590 imp gal; 710 US gal)
- Prime mover: Prototypes: Maybach MD 16 V 538 TB; Main series: MTU 16 V 652 TB 10 or MTU 16 V 538 TB 10
- Engine type: V16 diesel engine
- Cylinders: 16
- Cylinder size: (?)
- Transmission: Hydraulic – two speed: prototypes:Voith L 218 rs main series:Voith L 821 rs.
- Loco brake: Hydrodynamic brake, Air
- Train brakes: Air
- Safety systems: ETCS
Performance figures
- Maximum speed: 120 km/h (75 mph) or 80 km/h (50 mph)
- Power output: 1,397 kW (1,873 hp)
- Tractive effort: 235.2 kN (52,900 lbf)

The Class V 160 (after 1968: Class 216) is a class of diesel-hydraulic locomotives of the German railways. It is the first variant of the V160 family, built for the Deutsche Bundesbahn for medium/heavy trains.

The Class were successful locomotives, eventually leading to a family of similar locomotives (see DB V 160 family). Due to them having steam heating, and a lack in later years of suitable coaching stock they were amongst the first of the family to be withdrawn, no examples being operated by Deutsche Bahn by 2004.

A few examples were converted to the short lived DBAG Class 226, with other examples being rebuilt and still in service with private operators.

== Background and history ==
Following good performance from the diesel-hydraulic locomotive the DB Class V 80, in the period of history of the German Railways sometimes known as Epoch III, the Deutsche Bundesbahn planned (in 1953) to build several types of new diesel locomotive, primarily to replace steam powered locomotives; these were: V 60, and V 65, both shunters, the V 65.2, also for shunting as well as light freight trains, DB Class V 200, for express passenger trains, and the V 160 for both freight and passenger work on the main network.

Initially a 1600 hp machine using two engines of the type used in the V80 was planned; in a similar fashion to the V200, which was powered by two engines of the type used in the V100. However, it was realised that if a single high-powered engine could be used, then maintenance and other costs would be reduced.

The new class would replace engines such as the BR 03, BR 23, BR 38.10 (pr P 8), BR 39 (pr P 10), BR 50, BR 57 (pr G 10) and BR 78 (pr T 18). Steam heating (for passenger coaches) was necessary, and a top speed of 120 km/h was specified.

In the spring of 1956 development began at Krupp, the first unit being delivered on 6 August 1960, with eight more units being delivered by 1962 from both Krupp and Henschel. These prototype units were later to become unusual amongst the entire V 160 family, due to their rounded front end – in a similar but less sophisticated design to the V 200s – because of this 'bulbous' front end the locomotives earned the nickname lollo (in allusion to Gina Lollobrigida). A final prototype V 160 010, the tenth, and the first with the angled front end, was manufactured by Henschel in 1963; the more modern looking front end was derived from the Henschel prototype locomotive V 320 001 of which only one was built.

The prototypes performed well, and volume production began, numbers V 160 011 to V 160 224 being built between 1964 and 1968 by Krupp, Henschel, KHD, Krauss-Maffei and MaK. By the time the 156th example had been produced the Deutsche Bundesbahn had changed its numbering system; from then on the class had reporting number 216 with the individual unit numbering continuing as before.

Over the next decade, because of changing requirements – mostly in terms of increased power, and speed, as well as the requirement for electrical passenger heating a number of related classes sprang up – the Classes 210, 215, 217, 218 and 219 (see DB Class V 160 family); although some were a little longer, and carried additional components, all were essentially based on the original V 160; over 800 machines of all types were eventually built.

== Design ==
The initial ten pre-production machines with the exception of V 160 006 were powered by a Maybach engine of the type MD 16 V 538 TB. The others were powered by a MTU 16 V 538 TB 10 or MTU 16V 653 TB 10 (16 cylinders and a power of 1900 hp at 1500 rpm). In all examples both bogies are powered via drive shafts from a two-speed hydraulic drive from Voith

The welded steel chassis (formed of U beams and transverse members) and the body shell form the load-bearing frame, which rests on the two welded steel bogies, supported by helical springs, the engine is centrally located, with the fuel, batteries, oil, and fuel oil being hung below the chassis frame, between the bogies. The welded steel components along with other lightweight materials were used to keep the axle load below 20t. However, in the main production series of locomotives some of the lighter weight welded construction was abandoned in favour of less expensively produced components – leading to an increase in axle weight from ~18.5 to ~20t.

In addition to the main engine a small auxiliary diesel engine available, driving a generator providing the 110 V electrical supply for lighting as well as driving an electric air compression for the brakes.

The steam heating apparatus took up one end of the locomotive, between the engine and drivers cabin; powered by fuel oil, it had the capacity to satisfactorily heat 10 coaches when the outside temperature was −10 °C. The equipment was sourced from Hagenuk, the full capacity being 670 L of fuel oil and 2850 L of water.

Most of the locomotives were also equipped for push-pull operation, as well as for multiple working, controlled via a 36-pin control cable.

The safety devices Sicherheitsfahrschaltung (or Sifa) and Punktförmige Zugbeeinflussung (also known as PZB or Indusi) are fitted. Later on Zugbahnfunk; a cab to control room analogue radio system was installed. Other equipment includes sand boxes, a whistle and, on some machines, automatic door locking (when moving).

== Operations ==
The first locomotives entered service on the Hamburg to Lübeck line, working push-pull double decked passenger trains, and replacing the BR 38.10 and BR 78 steam engines. The engines were also used on freight workings as well. On push-pull passenger working the locomotives were sometimes found in the middle of the train – which facilitated easier separation of carriages en route.

Since the 1990s the Class 216 locomotives started to work more on freight than on passenger trains because of the lack of steam heated passenger stock. Between 2000 and 2004 the Deutsche Bahn fleet was phased out, with the last locomotive being decommissioned in 2004. However, several locomotives were sold to private operators, where they are still in use.

== Variants ==
In addition to the machines built in the 1970s, a few other variants have arisen subsequently, by rebuilding of existing machines.

=== DBAG Class 226 ===
The seven examples of the 226 Class were created by Deutsche Bahn for towing ICE 3 sets – for this purpose they were fitted with Scharfenberg couplers and the steam heating removed and repand replaced with ballast. They were replaced by converted DB Class 218s (subclass 218.8) in 2004 and scrapped in 2005.

=== DH 1504 ===
The first of the series of rebuilt Class 216s, DH 1504, was created in 1998 by the firm 'On Rail'. The concept was to create a new 'Class 216' medium power locomotive from retired state-owned Class 216 locomotives; the result was an almost completely new locomotive, only the transmission, bogies and frame were saved from the original locomotive. The engine is a 1500 kW MTU engine, and the units are fitted for remote control operation.

Overall, 6 of these locomotives were built, three locomotives are now in the use of the Osthannoversche Eisenbahnen (OHE), two work for Niederrheinische Verkehrsbetriebe (NIAG) and one for the Mindener Kreisbahnen (MKB).

== Liveries ==
Initial machines were delivered in altrot (antique red), with side skirts and ventilation grills dark grey, and the roof light grey. The museum locomotive 216 221 still bears the 'altrot' livery. In January 1975, 216 071 was the first locomotive to be painted in the then new ocean blue-beige color scheme. In February 1988 216 068 was the first locomotive of this series to receive the somewhat unpopular orientrot livery – an orient red lacquer with a white "bib" on the front. The other livery carried by DB Class 160's was the verkehrsrot (traffic red) colour scheme with mid grey skirts and ventilation grills.

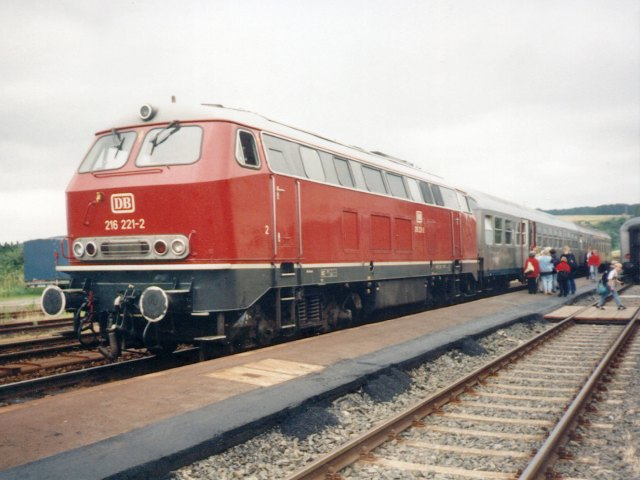
Main production form example in 'altrot' livery DB 216 014

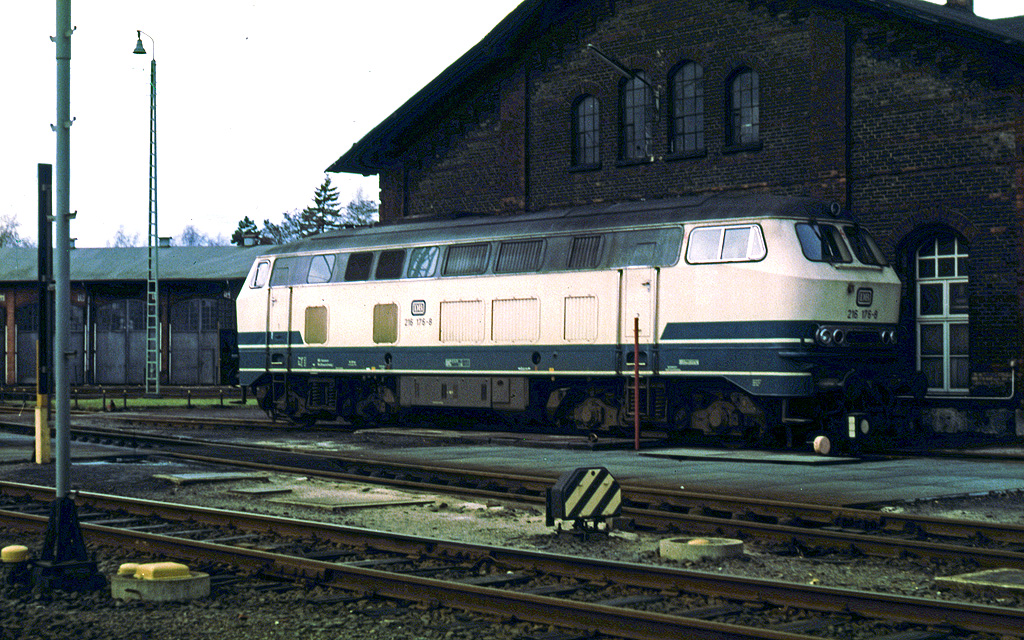
216 176 in 'turquoise and cream' livery

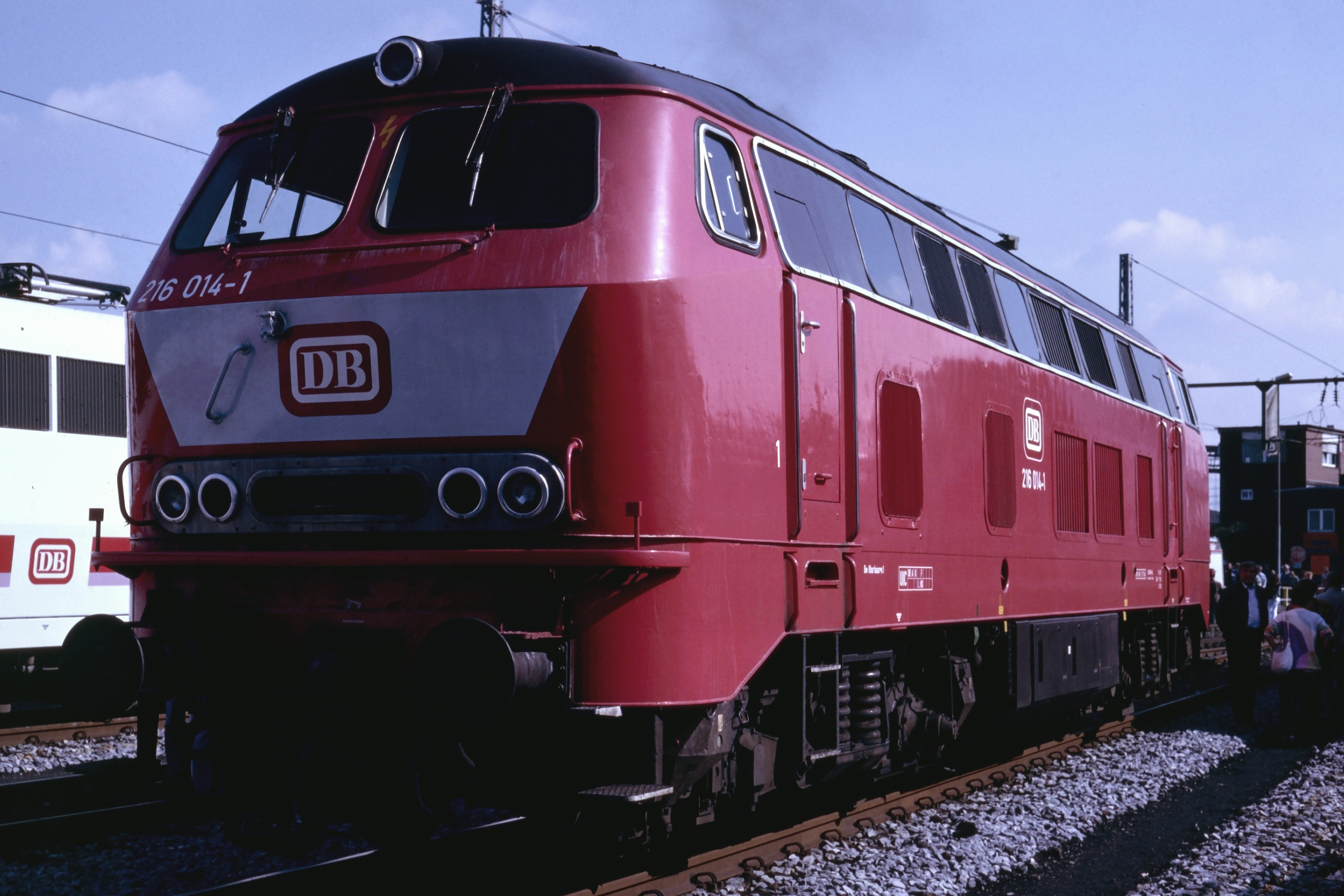
216 014 in 'orientrot' livery

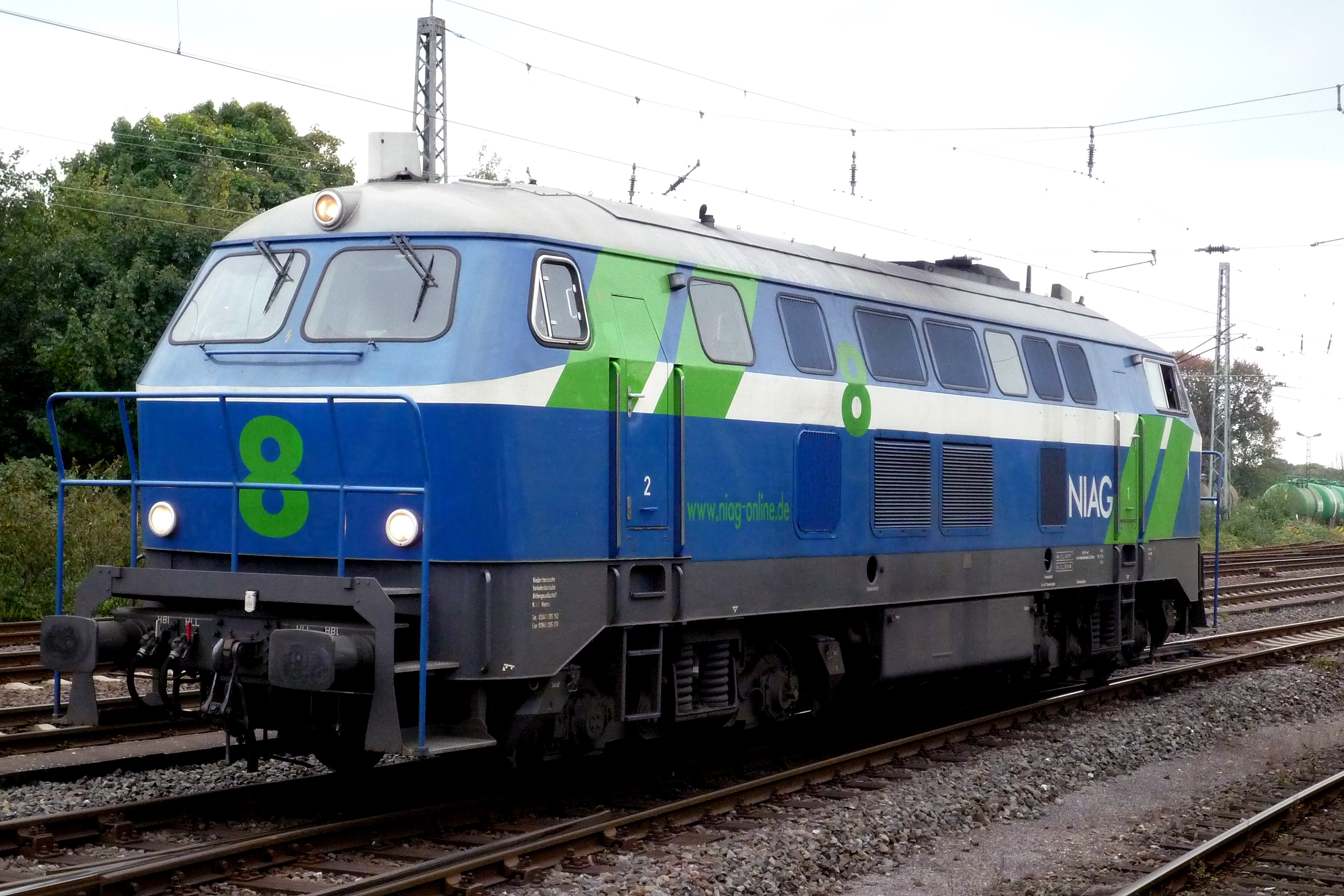
Rebuilt Class 216 in NIAG livery

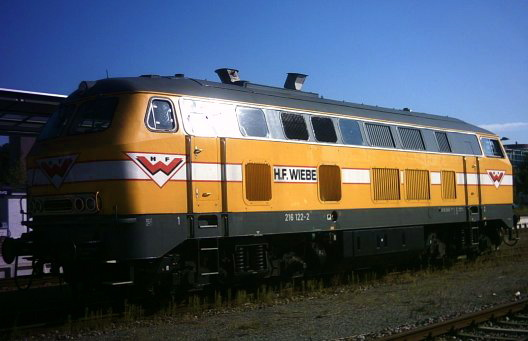
ex DB 216 122 in H. F. Wiebe livery
