= DB V 160 family =

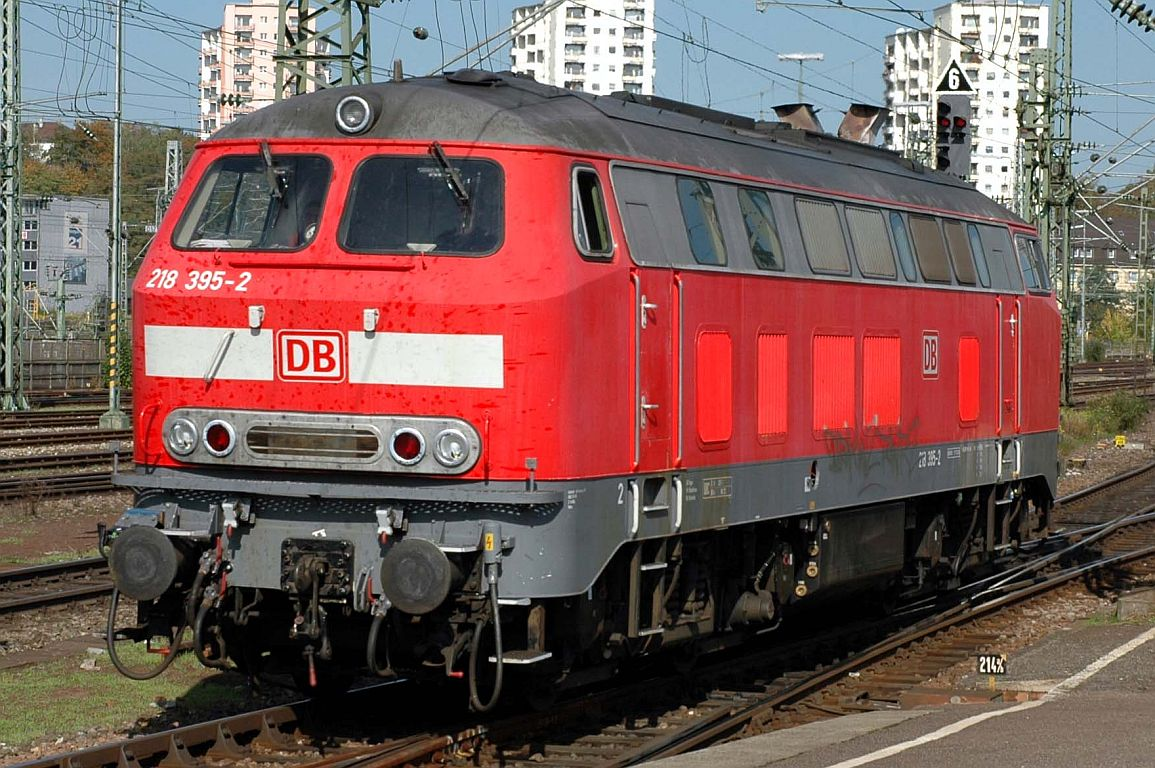
- 218 395 in Stuttgart (October 2004)
Type and origin
- Power type: Diesel-hydraulic
- Builder: Krupp, KHD, Henschel, Krauss-Maffei, MaK
Specifications
- Configuration
  - UIC: B′B′
- Gauge: 1,435 mm (4 ft 8 1/2 in)
- Length: 216 : 16.0 m 210,215,217,218,219 : 16.4 m
- Loco weight: 76 to 80 t depending on class
- Fuel type: Diesel
- Prime mover: MTU 16 V 652 TB 10 or MTU 16 V 538 TB 10; 218 : MA12V956TB11 and others-->
- Engine type: V12 and V16
- Generator: 217 and 218 have auxiliary electrical generators ~400 kW, 215 and 216 have steam heating
- Transmission: hydraulic, Torque converter
- Train brakes: Air
- Safety systems: ETCS
Performance figures
- Maximum speed: 216 : 80 km/h (freight), 120 km/h (passenger); 215,217,218 : 100 km/h (freight), 140 km/h (passenger); 210 : 160 km/h
- Power output: 215,216,217 : 1320 kW; 218,210 : 1840 kW (later 2060 kW)

The DB V 160 locomotive family comprises several classes of closely related 4-axle diesel-hydraulic locomotives built in the 1960s and 1970s for the Deutsche Bundesbahn which take the family name from the earliest built model: the 'DB Class V 160'.

The DB Classes V 160 (later 216), 215, V 162 (later 217), V 164 (later 218), V 169 (later 219) and DB Class 210 comprise the family, being supplemented by the DBAG Classes 225 and 226, formed from original rebuilt machines.

They formed the backbone of non-shunting locomotive diesel traction in Germany up to the 1990s, and continued to do so along with the Class 232 locomotives of the former Deutsche Reichsbahn in the 2000s.

== DB locomotives ==
The first post-postwar diesel heavy-duty locomotives, such as the DB Class V 200, had two engines of 800/980 kW each. That concept proved very expensive in maintenance; therefore, in the mid-1950s, development of a medium-duty single engine locomotive was started to replace them.

=== Class 216: The first V 160 ===
In 1960, the first production run of ten units was manufactured, each with one 1400 kW engine. The name comes from its nominal engine power in horsepower–1900 hp, V standing for Verbrennungsmotor, even though during development the engine output was increased.

Maximum speed was either 80 or 120 km/h (50 or 75 mph) (depending on the setting of the two speed hydraulic transmission). Various lightweight materials and construction methods were employed to keep the weight below 80 t. From 1963 to 1969, two-hundred and fourteen Class 216 locomotives were manufactured. They were used both for passenger and freight service. Heating for passenger coaches was made available by a steam boiler.

=== Class 215 ===
From the original Class 216, the Class 215 was derived, with an increased speed of 140 km/h (87 mph) (slow gear for freight trains at 100 km/h). The other parameters were largely unchanged, but the length was increased by 400 mm in order to make a later conversion to Class 218 possible. A total of 150 units of this class were produced. Many transferred to DB Cargo, and now are numbered as DBAG Class 225.

=== Class V 162 (Class 217) ===
As the heating of passenger cars was changing from steam to electricity, another variant with an additional auxiliary engine powering a generator was produced: the Class 217. Only 15 of these units were produced, the single engined Class 218 had far fewer components and so was built in preference. Maximum speed was 140 km/h (87 mph) and the power output was 1,320 kW plus auxiliary engine.

=== Class V 164 (Class 218) ===
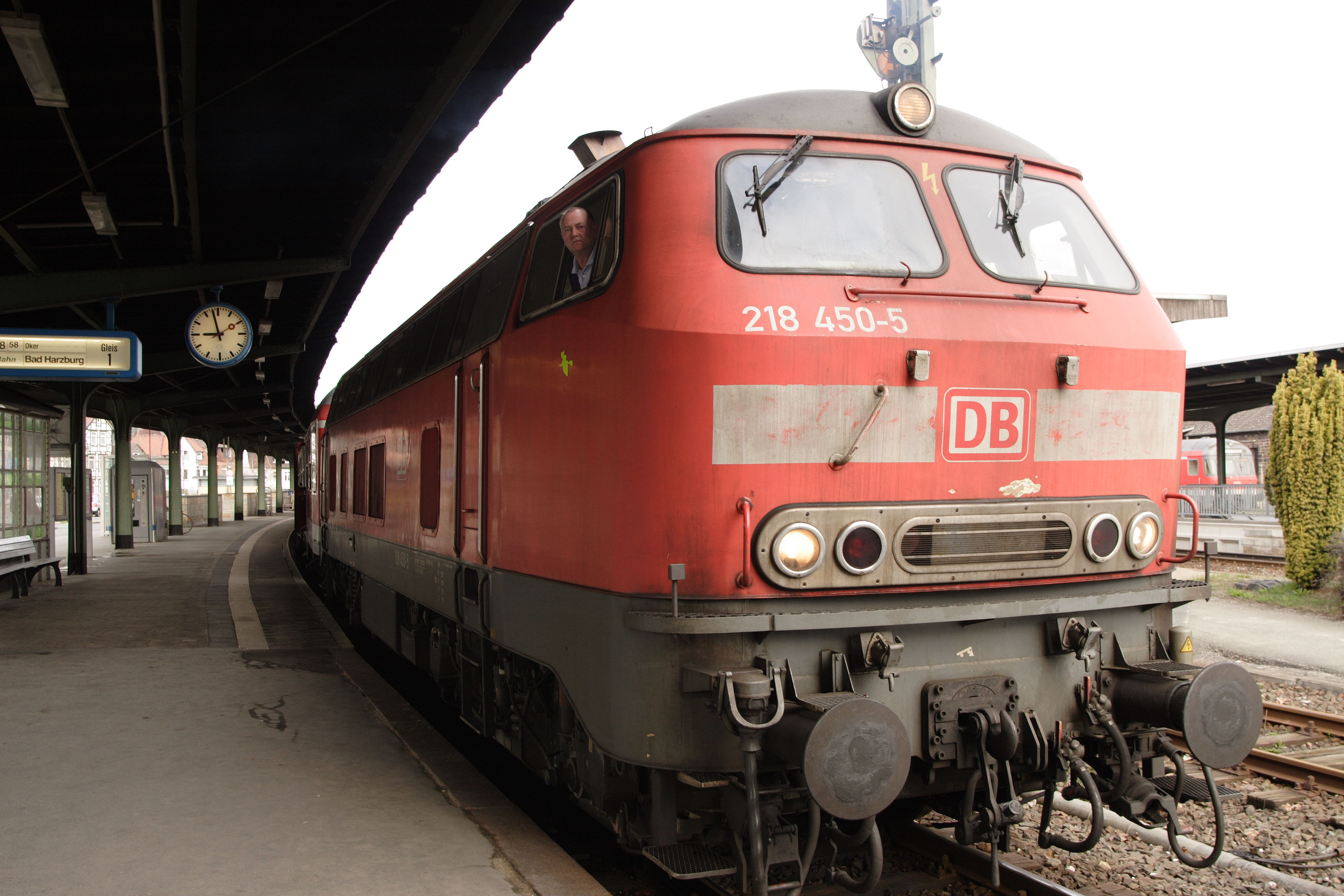
218 450 in Goslar

After some testing in class 215 units, a stronger engine with 1,840 kW (later increased to 2,060 kW) was approved for rail service. Power for supply of electricity by generator could be taken directly from this more powerful main engine. The result was Class 218, with some 410 units built between 1971 and 1979; these became the backbone of diesel traction at Deutsche Bahn AG. Class 218 locomotives were used for any type of train, from intercity trains to heavy freight trains. Where necessary, double or triple traction was possible. Maximum speed was 140 km/h (100 km/h in low gear) and all locomotives were equipped with a hydraulic braking system.

A subclass 218.9 was formed from rebuilt Class 210s, with the auxiliary gas turbine removed.

=== Class V 169 (Class 219) ===
Derived from Class 216 was one single unit with an additional gas turbine; Class V 169 (later Class 219). The class number 219 was reused after the merger of Deutsche Bahn and the Deutsche Reichsbahn for the East German DR Class 119.

In August 2021 the V169 was bought by locomotive engineer Roland Sandkuhl who founded his own company LOKRAPID (LR) in Oldenburg. In 2022 he restored the locomotive and repainted it in its original DB livery with respectively one of her former official numbers V 169 001 and 219 001-5 on the fronts. It went back in service on 20 September 2022 under the UIC number "92 80 1219 001-5 D-LR" operating various trains.

=== Class 210 ===
A faster variation was the Class 210, with a maximum speed of 160 km/h. Similar to a class 218 and developed using the gas turbine experience from the Class V 169; eight Class 210 units were equipped with a gas turbine used as a booster. The gas turbines were not fuel efficient and after two turbine failures all were removed and the Class 210 units were renumbered as Class 218.9.

== DBAG locomotives ==
The units inherited from the former Deutsche Bundesbahn continued to be essential to the railways of Germany after the merger of the two railway companies. As part of the restructuring of the Deutsche Bahn, and in response to changing requirements, several new classes and sub-classes were formed in this era.

=== DBAG Class 225 ===
Units transferred to DB Cargo, formed of both rebuilt Class 215s (forming the majority of the class) and Class 218 locomotives (forming the subclass 225.8).

=== DBAG Class 226 ===
These units were converted for towing and shunting operations of passenger stock by the addition of Scharfenberg couplers.

== Private locomotives ==
Starting from around the early 2000s Deutsche Bahn began to withdraw some of its V 160 family from service, some locomotives were scrapped, others were bought by private rail operators, some used 'as is', others were heavily modified, such as DH 1504.

== Outlook ==
Most class 215 and class 216 units are no longer in service, although some were reconstructed and now serve private railway companies. The Class 217 units are still used for freight trains around Mühldorf as of 2008. It has not been decided yet how to replace the aging class 215 and class 218 units. However, an ever increasing number of passenger trains are being changed from locomotive/passenger coach type to modern DMU units, so the class 218's role in passenger service is decreasing. In freight service, former East German Class 232 units have taken over many trains. Nevertheless, some Class 218 units are refitted and are now numbered as Class 218.8.
