= Köln-Müngersdorf Technologiepark station =

Railway station in Germany

Köln Müngersdorf Technologiepark
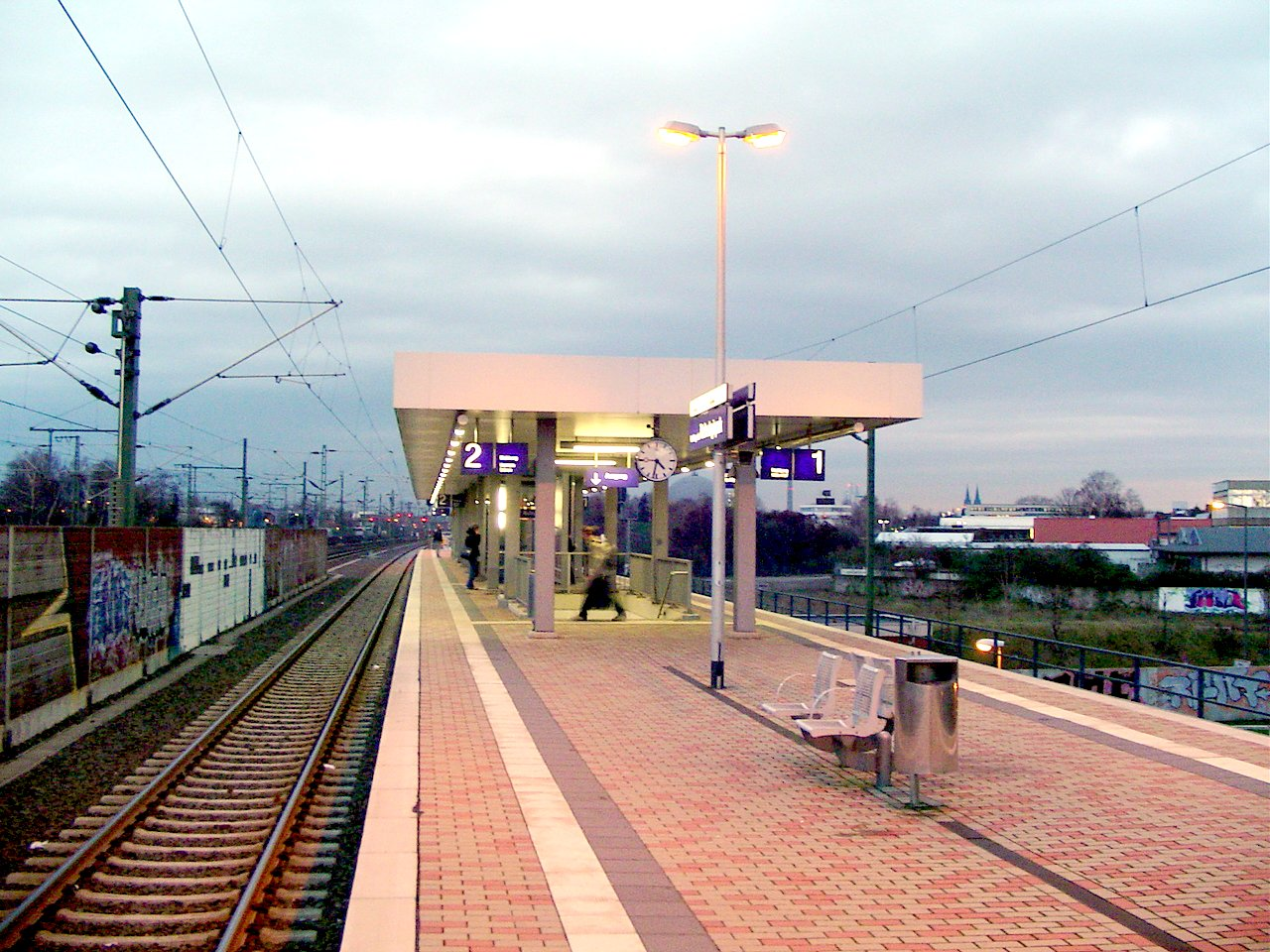

General information
- Location: Vitalisstr., Köln-Müngersdorf Technologiepark, Cologne, NRW; Germany
- Coordinates: 50°56′54″N 6°53′17″E
- Owner: Deutsche Bahn
- Operator: DB Netz; DB Station&Service
- Line: Cologne–Aachen

Construction
- Accessible: Yes

Other information
- Station code: 5335
- DS100 code: KKMT
- IBNR: 8003375
- Category: 5
- Fare zone: VRS: 2100
- Website: www.bahnhof.de

History
- Opened: 15 December 2002

Services
Preceding station	Cologne S-Bahn	Following station
Köln-Lövenich towards Horrem	S12	Köln-Ehrenfeld towards Au (Sieg)
Köln-Lövenich towards Düren	S19	Köln-Ehrenfeld towards Au (Sieg)
Location

Köln-Müngersdorf/Technologiepark is a railway station situated at Müngersdorf, Cologne in western Germany. The station was opened on 15 December 2002 on a section of the Cologne–Aachen railway that was opened by the Rhenish Railway Company between Cologne and Müngersdorf on 2 August 1839. The station has a partially covered island platform, which is connected by two sets of stairs and a lift to the street below, on which there is a Kölner Verkehrsbetriebe (Cologne Transport) bus stop.

The station is served by Cologne S-Bahn lines S19 between Düren and Hennef (Sieg), Blankenberg (Sieg), Herchen or Au (Sieg) every 20 minutes Monday–Saturday and S12 between Sindorf or Düren and Troisdorf every 60 minutes Monday–Saturday. Together these provide four services an hour through Cologne on working days and three services an hour on Sunday.
