= Köln-Lövenich station =

Railway station in Cologne, Germany

Köln-Lövenich
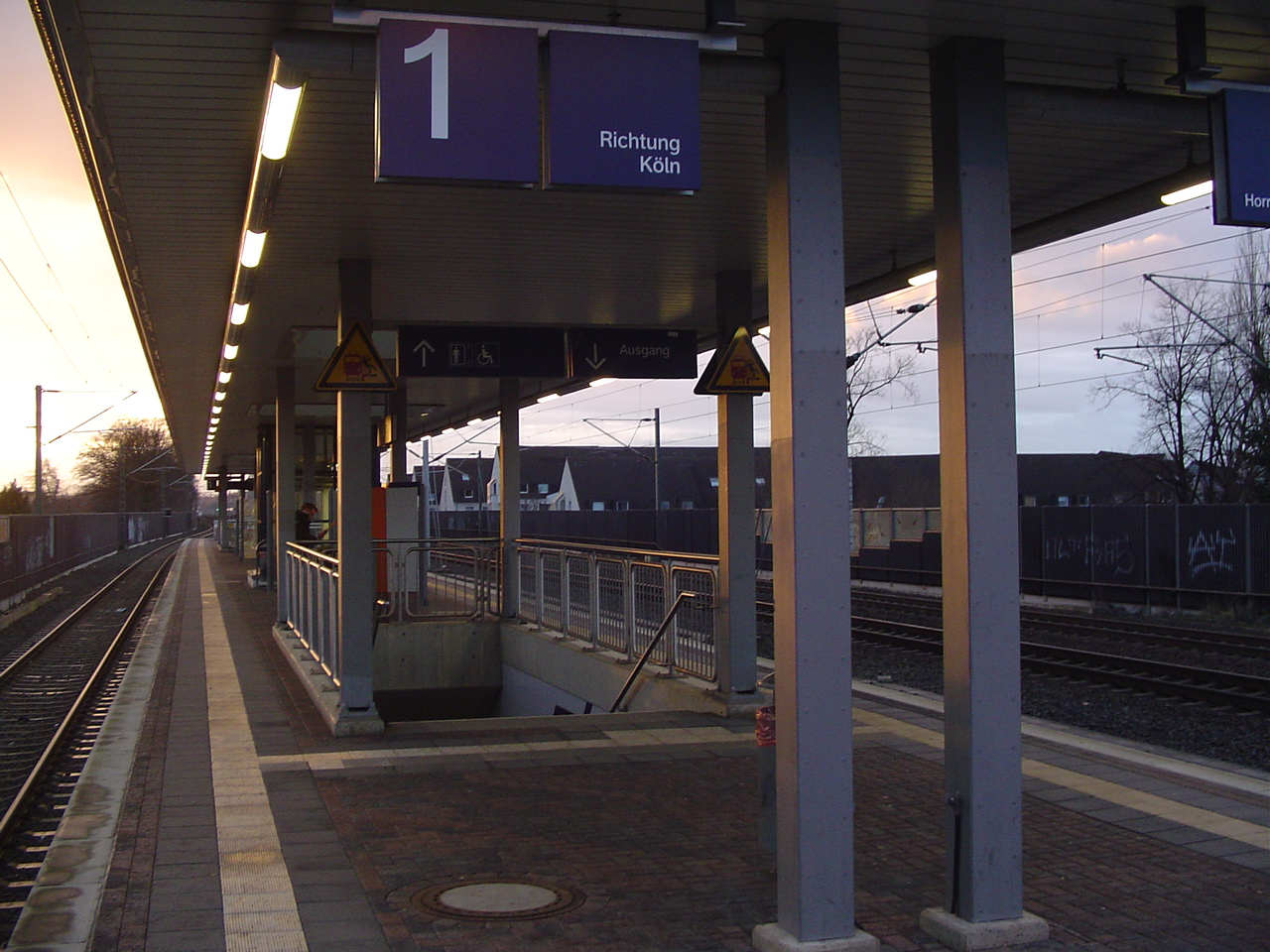

General information
- Location: Goethestr. 1, Lövenich, Cologne, North Rhine-Westphalia; Germany
- Coordinates: 50°56′54″N 6°53′17″E
- Line: Cologne–Aachen
- Platforms: 2

Construction
- Accessible: Yes

Other information
- Station code: 3795
- DS100 code: KKMT
- IBNR: 8003732
- Category: 5
- Fare zone: VRS: 2100
- Website: www.bahnhof.de

Services
| Preceding station | Cologne S-Bahn | Following station |
|---|---|---|
| Köln-Weiden West towards Horrem | S12 | Köln-Müngersdorf Technologiepark towards Au (Sieg) |
| Köln-Weiden West towards Düren | S19 | Köln-Müngersdorf Technologiepark towards Au (Sieg) |
Location
- Location within North Rhine-Westphalia

Köln-Lövenich is a railway station situated at Lövenich, Cologne in western Germany on the Cologne–Aachen railway. It is classified by Deutsche Bahn as a category 5 station.

== History ==
Lövenich station was opened on 2 July 1840 with the second phase of construction of the Cologne–Aachen railway at line-km 9.0 and was the western terminus of the line for about a year. In 2002, an S-Bahn stop was built west of the station at 9.7 km. At the same time, the former Lövenich station was dismantled and is now used only for passing loops. The S-Bahn stop has an island platform between the S-Bahn tracks.

== Services ==
| Line | Route | Frequency |
|---|---|---|
| S12 | Horrem – Köln Lövenich – Köln Messe/Deutz station – Troisdorf – Siegburg/Bonn – Hennef – Au | 20 min (Horrem–Hennef) 60 min (Hennef–Au) |
| S19 | Düren – Horrem – Köln Lövenich – Köln Messe/Deutz – Köln/Bonn Airport – Troisdorf – Siegburg/Bonn – Hennef – Au | 20/40 min (Horrem–Hennef); 60 min (Hennef–Au) |

The station is served by Cologne S-Bahn lines S19 between Düren and Hennef (Sieg), Blankenberg (Sieg), Herchen or Au (Sieg) every 20 minutes Monday–Saturday and S12 between Sindorf or Düren and Troisdorf every 60 minutes Monday–Saturday. Together these provide four services an hour through Cologne on working days and three services an hour on Sunday.

The city bus lines 136, 141, 144, 145, 148, 149 and 172 have a stop at Köln-Lövenich station.

There also is a bike and ride (B+R) faciality at the station.
