= Buir station =

Railway station in Germany

Buir
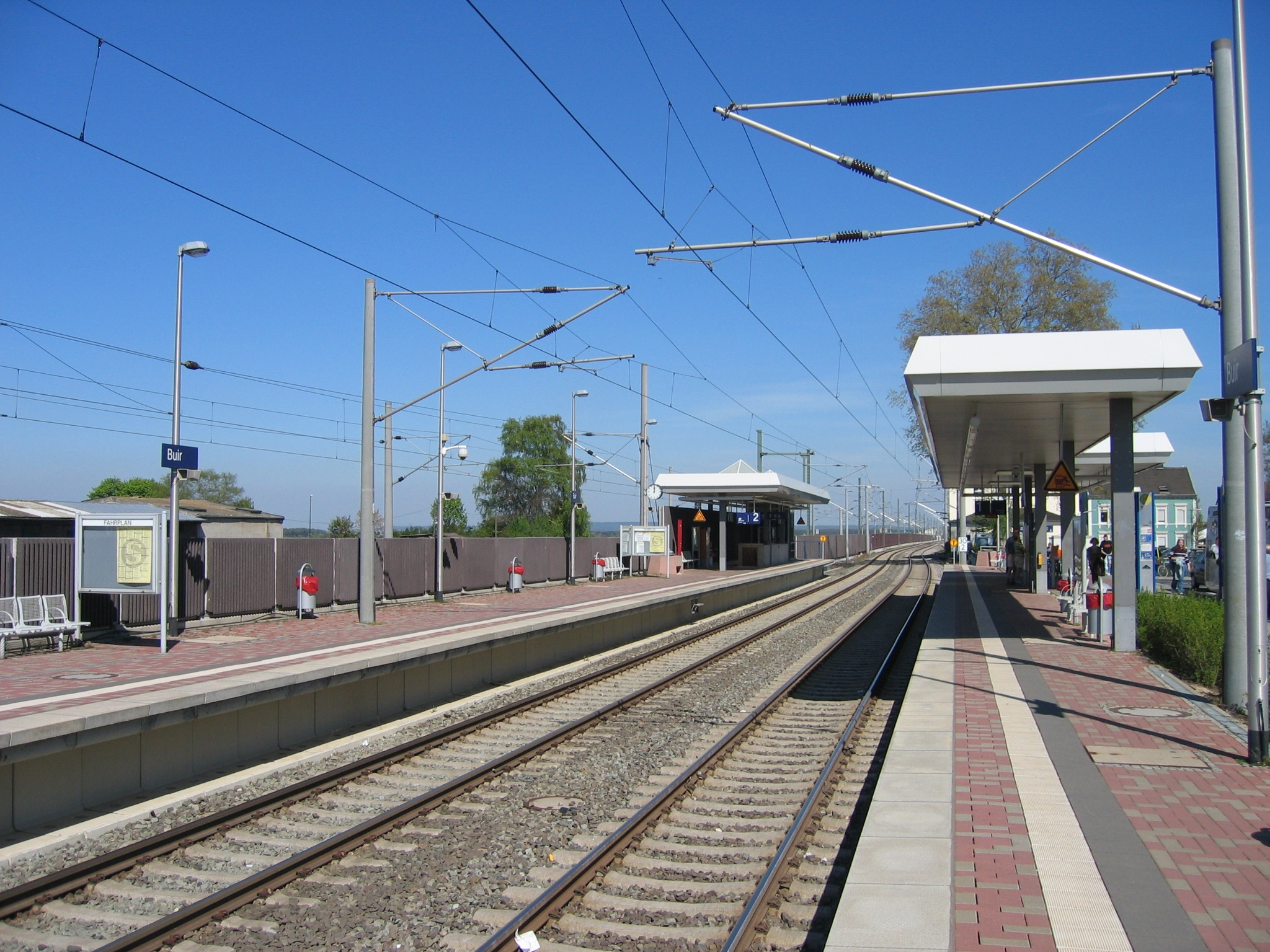

General information
- Location: An der Brennerei 2, Buir, Kerpen, NRW; Germany
- Coordinates: 50°51′46″N 6°34′30″E
- Line: Cologne–Aachen

Construction
- Accessible: Yes

Other information
- Station code: 962
- DS100 code: KKWW
- IBNR: 8001264
- Category: 5
- Fare zone: VRS: 2870
- Website: www.bahnhof.de

History
- Opened: 1841

Services
Preceding station	Cologne S-Bahn	Following station
Merzenich towards Düren	S19	Sindorf towards Au (Sieg)
Location

Buir is a railway station situated at Kerpen, Rhein-Erft-Kreis in the German state of North Rhine-Westphalia on the Cologne–Aachen railway.

It was opened in 1841 with two platform tracks at an island platform and a passing track. A malt factory located next to the station formerly had a siding. It was rebuilt in 2002 with the construction of the S-Bahn tracks and has two side platforms north and south of the S-Bahn tracks. The northern side platform is separated from the mainline tracks by a noise barrier. Access to the northern platform is via an underpass.

It is served by the S19 service between Düren and Blankenberg (Sieg), Herchen or Au (Sieg) on working days and between Düren and Hennef (Sieg) on Saturdays, Sundays and public holidays. It is classified by Deutsche Bahn as a category 5 station.
