= Merten (Sieg) station =

Railway station in Germany

Merten (Sieg)
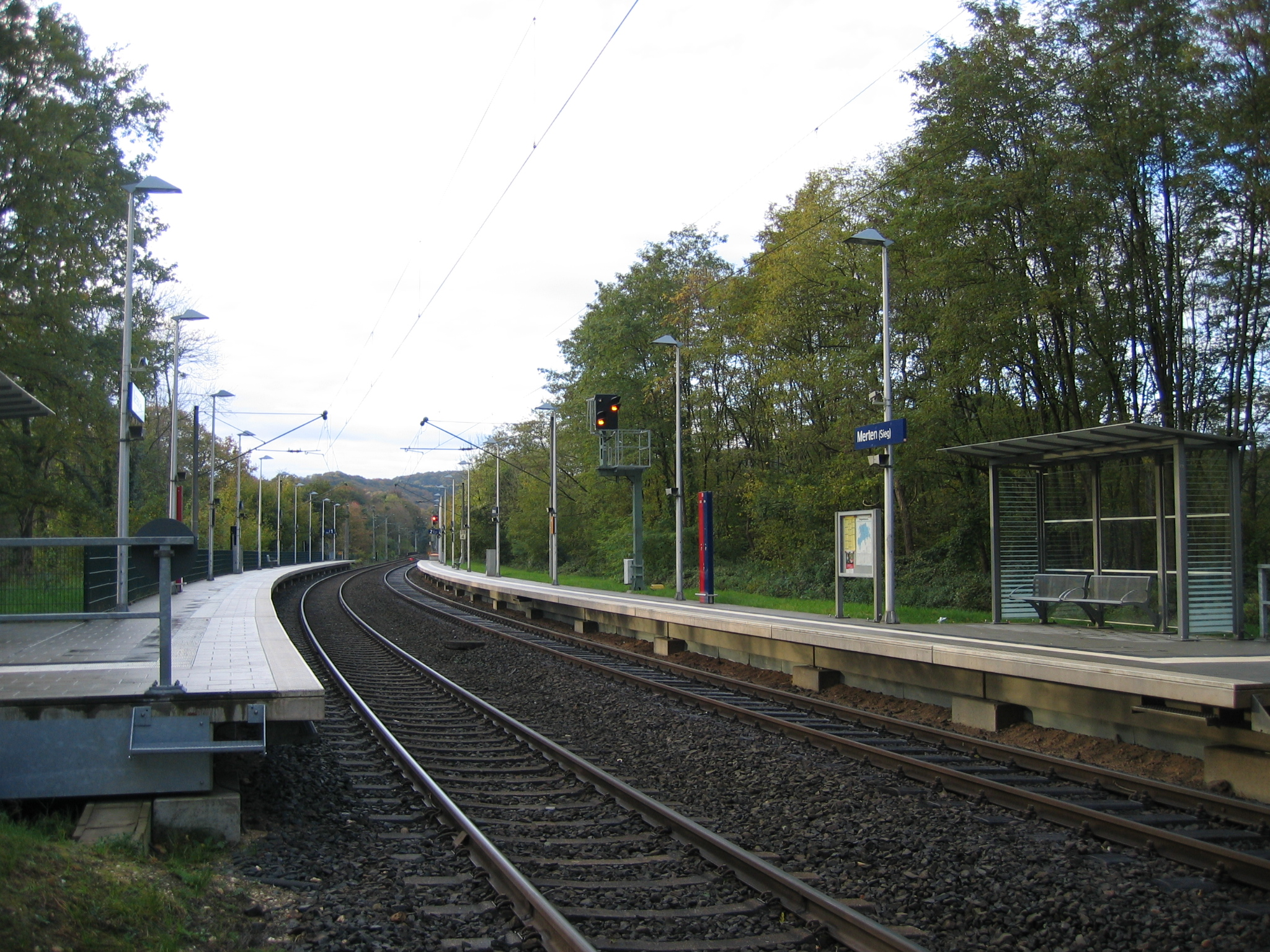

General information
- Location: Burgweg, Merten (Sieg), Eitorf, North Rhine-Westphalia; Germany
- Coordinates: 50°46′13″N 7°23′09″E
- System: Through station
- Lines: Cologne–Siegen (KBS 450.12)
- Platforms: 2

Construction
- Accessible: Yes

Other information
- Station code: 4070
- DS100 code: KMES
- IBNR: 8003987
- Category: 6
- Fare zone: VRS: 2591
- Website: www.bahnhof.de

History
- Opened: 1897/1905

Services
Preceding station	Cologne S-Bahn	Following station
Hennef im Siegbogen towards Horrem	S12	Eitorf towards Au (Sieg)
Hennef im Siegbogen towards Düren	S19	Eitorf towards Au (Sieg)
Location
- Location within North Rhine-Westphalia

Merten (Sieg) station is a station on the Sieg Railway, situated in Eitorf, Rhein-Sieg-Kreis in the German state of North Rhine-Westphalia. The station was opened between 1897 and 1905 on a section of the Sieg Railway, opened by the Cologne-Minden Railway Company (German: Cöln-Mindener Eisenbahn-Gesellschaft, CME) between Hennef (Sieg) and Eitorf on 1 August 1860. It has two platform tracks and is classified by Deutsche Bahn as a category 6 station.

The station is served by S-Bahn S 12 services between Köln-Ehrenfeld and Au (Sieg) and S19 services Monday to Saturday between Düren and Herchen or Au (Sieg). Both services operate hourly.
