= Rhein-Sieg-Kreis I =

Federal electoral district of Germany

96 Rhein-Sieg-Kreis I
- Electoral district for the Bundestag
- Rhein-Sieg-Kreis I in 2025
- State: North Rhine-Westphalia
- Population: 314,900 (2019)
- Electorate: 238,627 (2021)
- Major settlements: Troisdorf; Hennef (Sieg); Siegburg
- Area: 660.7 km^{2}

Current electoral district
- Created: 1949
- Party: CDU
- Member: Elisabeth Winkelmeier-Becker
- Elected: 2005, 2009, 2013, 2017, 2021, 2025

Rhein-Sieg-Kreis I is an electoral constituency (German: Wahlkreis) represented in the Bundestag. It elects one member via first-past-the-post voting. Under the current constituency numbering system, it is designated as constituency 96. It is located in southwestern North Rhine-Westphalia, comprising the eastern part of the Rhein-Sieg-Kreis district.

Rhein-Sieg-Kreis I was created for the inaugural 1949 federal election. Since 2002, it has been represented by Elisabeth Winkelmeier-Becker of the Christian Democratic Union (CDU).

== Geography ==
Rhein-Sieg-Kreis I is located in southwestern North Rhine-Westphalia. As of the 2021 federal election, it comprises the municipalities of Eitorf, Hennef (Sieg), Lohmar, Much, Neunkirchen-Seelscheid, Niederkassel, Ruppichteroth, Siegburg, Troisdorf, and Windeck from the Rhein-Sieg-Kreis district.

== History ==
Rhein-Sieg-Kreis I was created in 1949, then known as Siegkreis. In the 1965 and 1969 elections, it was named Siegkreis I – Bonn-Land. It acquired its current name in the 1972 election. In the 1949 election, it was North Rhine-Westphalia constituency 11 in the numbering system. From 1953 through 1961, it was number 70. From 1965 through 1998, it was number 64. From 2002 through 2009, it was number 98. In the 2013 through 2021 elections, it was number 97. From the 2025 election, it has been number 96.

Originally, the constituency was coterminous with the Siegkreis district. In the 1965 through 1976 elections, it comprised the district of Landkreis Bonn as well as the modern municipalities of Bad Honnef, Königswinter, Niederkassel, Troisdorf, and Sankt Augustin from the Siegkreis district. It acquired its current borders in the 1980 election.

Election	No.	Name	Borders
1949	11	Siegkreis	Siegkreis district
1953	70	Siegkreis	Siegkreis district
1957	70	Siegkreis	Siegkreis district
1961	70	Siegkreis	Siegkreis district
1965	64	Siegkreis I – Bonn-Land	Landkreis Bonn district; Siegkreis district (only Bad Honnef, Königswinter, Niederkassel, Troisdorf, and Sankt Augustin municipalities)
1969	64	Siegkreis I – Bonn-Land	Landkreis Bonn district; Siegkreis district (only Bad Honnef, Königswinter, Niederkassel, Troisdorf, and Sankt Augustin municipalities)
1972	64	Siegkreis I – Bonn-Land	Landkreis Bonn district; Siegkreis district (only Bad Honnef, Königswinter, Niederkassel, Troisdorf, and Sankt Augustin municipalities)
1976	64	Siegkreis I – Bonn-Land	Landkreis Bonn district; Siegkreis district (only Bad Honnef, Königswinter, Niederkassel, Troisdorf, and Sankt Augustin municipalities)
1980	64	Rhein-Sieg-Kreis I	Rhein-Sieg-Kreis district (only Eitorf, Hennef (Sieg), Lohmar, Much, Neunkirchen-Seelscheid, Niederkassel, Ruppichteroth, Siegburg, Troisdorf, and Windeck municipalities)
1983	64	Rhein-Sieg-Kreis I	Rhein-Sieg-Kreis district (only Eitorf, Hennef (Sieg), Lohmar, Much, Neunkirchen-Seelscheid, Niederkassel, Ruppichteroth, Siegburg, Troisdorf, and Windeck municipalities)
1987	64	Rhein-Sieg-Kreis I	Rhein-Sieg-Kreis district (only Eitorf, Hennef (Sieg), Lohmar, Much, Neunkirchen-Seelscheid, Niederkassel, Ruppichteroth, Siegburg, Troisdorf, and Windeck municipalities)
1990	64	Rhein-Sieg-Kreis I	Rhein-Sieg-Kreis district (only Eitorf, Hennef (Sieg), Lohmar, Much, Neunkirchen-Seelscheid, Niederkassel, Ruppichteroth, Siegburg, Troisdorf, and Windeck municipalities)
1994	64	Rhein-Sieg-Kreis I	Rhein-Sieg-Kreis district (only Eitorf, Hennef (Sieg), Lohmar, Much, Neunkirchen-Seelscheid, Niederkassel, Ruppichteroth, Siegburg, Troisdorf, and Windeck municipalities)
1998	64	Rhein-Sieg-Kreis I	Rhein-Sieg-Kreis district (only Eitorf, Hennef (Sieg), Lohmar, Much, Neunkirchen-Seelscheid, Niederkassel, Ruppichteroth, Siegburg, Troisdorf, and Windeck municipalities)
2002	98	Rhein-Sieg-Kreis I	Rhein-Sieg-Kreis district (only Eitorf, Hennef (Sieg), Lohmar, Much, Neunkirchen-Seelscheid, Niederkassel, Ruppichteroth, Siegburg, Troisdorf, and Windeck municipalities)
2005	98	Rhein-Sieg-Kreis I	Rhein-Sieg-Kreis district (only Eitorf, Hennef (Sieg), Lohmar, Much, Neunkirchen-Seelscheid, Niederkassel, Ruppichteroth, Siegburg, Troisdorf, and Windeck municipalities)
2009	98	Rhein-Sieg-Kreis I	Rhein-Sieg-Kreis district (only Eitorf, Hennef (Sieg), Lohmar, Much, Neunkirchen-Seelscheid, Niederkassel, Ruppichteroth, Siegburg, Troisdorf, and Windeck municipalities)
2013	97	Rhein-Sieg-Kreis I	Rhein-Sieg-Kreis district (only Eitorf, Hennef (Sieg), Lohmar, Much, Neunkirchen-Seelscheid, Niederkassel, Ruppichteroth, Siegburg, Troisdorf, and Windeck municipalities)
2017	97	Rhein-Sieg-Kreis I	Rhein-Sieg-Kreis district (only Eitorf, Hennef (Sieg), Lohmar, Much, Neunkirchen-Seelscheid, Niederkassel, Ruppichteroth, Siegburg, Troisdorf, and Windeck municipalities)
2021	97	Rhein-Sieg-Kreis I	Rhein-Sieg-Kreis district (only Eitorf, Hennef (Sieg), Lohmar, Much, Neunkirchen-Seelscheid, Niederkassel, Ruppichteroth, Siegburg, Troisdorf, and Windeck municipalities)
2025	96	Rhein-Sieg-Kreis I	Rhein-Sieg-Kreis district (only Eitorf, Hennef (Sieg), Lohmar, Much, Neunkirchen-Seelscheid, Niederkassel, Ruppichteroth, Siegburg, Troisdorf, and Windeck municipalities)

== Members ==
The constituency has been held by the Christian Democratic Union (CDU) during all but two Bundestag terms since its creation in 1949. It was first represented by Peter Etzenbach of the CDU from 1949 to 1961, followed by Georg Kliesing under 1976. Franz Möller served a single term from 1976 to 1980, being succeeded by Adolf Herkenrath. Andreas Krautscheid was elected in 1994 and served a single term. The Social Democratic Party (SPD) won the constituency in 1998, and Uwe Göllner served as representative. The CDU regained it in 2005 with candidate Elisabeth Winkelmeier-Becker. She was re-elected in 2009, 2013, 2017, 2021 and 2025.

Election	Member	Party	%
1949	Peter Etzenbach	CDU	37.2
1953	Peter Etzenbach	CDU	64.8
1957	Peter Etzenbach	CDU	65.4
1961	Georg Kliesing	CDU	59.1
1965	Georg Kliesing	CDU	61.8
1969	Georg Kliesing	CDU	54.8
1972	Georg Kliesing	CDU	52.6
1976	Franz Möller	CDU	55.6
1980	Adolf Herkenrath	CDU	46.6
1983	Adolf Herkenrath	CDU	54.8
1987	Adolf Herkenrath	CDU	49.6
1990	Adolf Herkenrath	CDU	46.0
1994	Andreas Krautscheid	CDU	45.8
1998	Uwe Göllner	SPD	44.6
2002	Uwe Göllner	SPD	44.2
2005	Elisabeth Winkelmeier-Becker	CDU	45.5
2009	Elisabeth Winkelmeier-Becker	CDU	44.9
2013	Elisabeth Winkelmeier-Becker	CDU	49.6
2017	Elisabeth Winkelmeier-Becker	CDU	44.3
2021	Elisabeth Winkelmeier-Becker	CDU	32.6
2025	Elisabeth Winkelmeier-Becker	CDU	35.6

== Election results ==
=== 2025 election ===
Federal election (2025): Rhein-Sieg-Kreis I
Notes:	Blue background denotes the winner of the electorate vote. Pink background denotes a candidate elected from their party list. Yellow background denotes an electorate win by a list member, or other incumbent. A ✓ or ✗ denotes status of any incumbent, win or lose respectively.						
Party	Candidate	Votes	%	±%	Party votes	%	±%
CDU	✓ Elisabeth Winkelmeier-Becker	70,350	35.6	▲3.0	63,340	31.9	▲4.4
SPD	Sebastian Hartmann	44,274	22.4	▼6.1	35,512	17.9	▼8.6
AfD	Tobias Ebenberger	34,562	17.5	▲10.5	34,457	17.4	▲10.1
Greens	Rebecca Stümper	22,218	11.2	▼2.8	24,764	12.5	▼3.2
Left	Jason Osterhagen	11,330	5.7	▲2.4	13,448	6.8	▲3.4
BSW					8,457	4.3	
FDP	Niko Gräfrath	8,438	4.3	▼4.6	9.897	5.0	▼7.4
FW	Martin Wunshock	3,318	1.7	▲0.6	1,251	0.6	▼0.1
Volt	Marcel Landsberg	3,101	1.6	▲1.0	1,712	0.9	▲0.4
Tierschutzpartei					2,598	1.3	▼0.3
PARTEI				▼2.1	1,089	0.5	▼0.6
dieBasis				▼1.6	510	0.3	▼1.1
PdF					367	0.2	▲0.2
Team Todenhöfer					347	0.2	▼0.3
BD					270	0.1	
Values					146	0.1	
MERA25					66	0.0	
MLPD					43	0.0	0.0
Pirates							▼0.4
Gesundheitsforschung							▼0.1
Bündnis C							▼0.1
ÖDP							▼0.1
Humanists							▼0.1
SGP						0.0	0.0
Informal votes		1,772			1,089		
Total valid votes		197,591			198,274		
Turnout		199,363	83.7	▲4.8			
CDU hold	Majority	26,076	13.2				

=== 2021 election ===
Federal election (2021): Rhein-Sieg-Kreis I
Notes:	Blue background denotes the winner of the electorate vote. Pink background denotes a candidate elected from their party list. Yellow background denotes an electorate win by a list member, or other incumbent. A ✓ or ✗ denotes status of any incumbent, win or lose respectively.						
Party	Candidate	Votes	%	±%	Party votes	%	±%
CDU	✓ Elisabeth Winkelmeier-Becker	60,776	32.6	▼11.7	51,474	27.6	▼6.6
SPD	Sebastian Hartmann	53,213	28.5	▲0.9	49,529	26.5	▲4.1
Greens	Lisa Anschütz	26,270	14.1	▲7.6	29,305	15.7	▲8.2
FDP	Ralph Lorenz	16,604	8.9	▼1.5	23,122	12.4	▼2.5
AfD	Hans Günter Eifler	13,045	7.0		13,604	7.3	▼2.7
Left	Alexander Neu	6,242	3.3	▼4.8	6,353	3.4	▼3.7
Tierschutzpartei					3,021	1.6	▲0.8
PARTEI	Andreas Langel	3,828	2.1		2,067	1.1	▲0.2
dieBasis	Ellen Hölzer	2,951	1.6		2,583	1.4	
FW	Andreas Irion	1,929	1.0		1,392	0.7	▲0.5
Team Todenhöfer					921	0.5	
Volt	Christian Sontag	1,006	0.5		921	0.5	
Pirates					804	0.4	0.0
Volksabstimmung	Helmut Fleck	602	0.3	▼2.7			
LIEBE					278	0.1	
Gesundheitsforschung					223	0.1	0.0
Bündnis C					220	0.1	
NPD					164	0.1	▼0.1
ÖDP					156	0.1	0.0
Humanists					153	0.1	0.0
LfK					154	0.1	
V-Partei3					134	0.1	0.0
du.					87	0.0	
PdF					52	0.0	
LKR					46	0.0	
SGP					23	0.0	0.0
MLPD					19	0.0	0.0
DKP					19	0.0	0.0
Informal votes		1,751			1,393		
Total valid votes		186,466			186,824		
Turnout		188,217	78.9	▲1.2			
CDU hold	Majority	7,563	4.1	▼12.6			

=== 2017 election ===
Federal election (2017): Rhein-Sieg-Kreis I
Notes:	Blue background denotes the winner of the electorate vote. Pink background denotes a candidate elected from their party list. Yellow background denotes an electorate win by a list member, or other incumbent. A ✓ or ✗ denotes status of any incumbent, win or lose respectively.						
Party	Candidate	Votes	%	±%	Party votes	%	±%
CDU	✓ Elisabeth Winkelmeier-Becker	79,987	44.3	▼5.3	62,334	34.1	▼9.3
SPD	Sebastian Hartmann	49,988	27.7	▼1.8	40,922	22.4	▼4.6
FDP	Ralph Lorenz	18,768	10.4	▲7.9	27,267	14.9	▲8.6
AfD					18,237	10.0	▲5.6
Left	Alexander Neu	14,684	8.1	▲3.5	13,038	7.1	▲1.6
Greens	Elisabeth Anschütz	11,762	6.5	▲0.1	13,757	7.5	▼0.7
PARTEI					1,610	0.9	▲0.5
Tierschutzpartei					1,538	0.8	
Pirates					771	0.4	▼1.8
Volksabstimmung	Helmut Fleck	5,374	3.0	▲2.3	630	0.3	▼0.1
FW					509	0.3	0.0
AD-DEMOKRATEN					374	0.2	
NPD					300	0.2	▼0.7
DiB					237	0.1	
ÖDP					233	0.1	0.0
BGE					211	0.1	
V-Partei³					206	0.1	
Gesundheitsforschung					181	0.1	
DM					178	0.1	
Die Humanisten					123	0.1	
MLPD					73	0.0	0.0
DKP					18	0.0	
SGP					10	0.0	0.0
Informal votes		3,732			1,538		
Total valid votes		180,563			182,757		
Turnout		184,295	77.6	▲4.0			
CDU hold	Majority	29,999	16.6	▼3.5			

=== 2013 election ===
Federal election (2013): Rhein-Sieg-Kreis I
Notes:	Blue background denotes the winner of the electorate vote. Pink background denotes a candidate elected from their party list. Yellow background denotes an electorate win by a list member, or other incumbent. A ✓ or ✗ denotes status of any incumbent, win or lose respectively.						
Party	Candidate	Votes	%	±%	Party votes	%	±%
CDU	✓ Elisabeth Winkelmeier-Becker	84,556	49.6	▲4.8	74,187	43.4	▲8.0
SPD	Sebastian Hartmann	50,271	29.5	▲3.7	46,065	27.0	▲4.0
Greens	Robert Wendt	10,895	6.4	▼1.9	14,000	8.2	▼2.3
Left	Alexander Neu	7,946	4.7	▼1.7	9,496	5.6	▼1.5
AfD	Hans-Josef Frings	5,519	3.2		7,514	4.4	
FDP	Jürgen Peter	4,172	2.4	▼8.9	10,796	6.3	▼12.7
Pirates	Martin Zieroth	3,472	2.0		3,771	2.2	▲0.5
NPD	Hans Hermann Maria Rochel	1,618	0.9	▼0.1	1,464	0.9	0.0
Volksabstimmung	Helmut Fleck	1,150	0.7	▼0.3	809	0.5	0.0
PARTEI					713	0.4	
FW	Iryna May	803	0.5		534	0.3	
PRO					315	0.2	
ÖDP					238	0.1	0.0
Nichtwahler					205	0.1	
BIG					152	0.1	
REP					148	0.1	▼0.1
Party of Reason					138	0.1	
RRP					103	0.1	▼0.1
PSG					38	0.0	0.0
BüSo					23	0.0	0.0
Die Rechte					20	0.0	
MLPD					18	0.0	0.0
Informal votes		2,251			1,906		
Total valid votes		170,402			170,747		
Turnout		172,653	73.7	▲1.5			
CDU hold	Majority	34,285	20.1	▲1.0			

=== 2009 election ===
Federal election (2009): Rhein-Sieg-Kreis I
Notes:	Blue background denotes the winner of the electorate vote. Pink background denotes a candidate elected from their party list. Yellow background denotes an electorate win by a list member, or other incumbent. A ✓ or ✗ denotes status of any incumbent, win or lose respectively.						
Party	Candidate	Votes	%	±%	Party votes	%	±%
CDU	✓ Elisabeth Winkelmeier-Becker	73,959	44.9	▼0.7	58,516	35.4	▼2.3
SPD	Dietmar Tendler	42,568	25.8	▼15.5	37,986	23.0	▼11.7
FDP	Markus Bestgen	18,727	11.4	▲7.0	31,488	19.1	▲6.9
Greens	Katja Ruiters	15,389	9.3	▲5.2	17,359	10.5	▲2.3
Left	Monika Dahl	10,523	6.4	▲3.2	11,650	7.1	▲2.7
Pirates					2,887	1.7	
NPD	Ariane Christine Meise	1,765	1.1	▲0.2	1,462	0.9	0.0
Tierschutzpartei					1,113	0.7	▲0.2
Volksabstimmung	Helmut Fleck	1,581	1.0	▲0.4	741	0.4	▲0.1
FAMILIE					678	0.4	0.0
RENTNER					432	0.3	
Independent	Victor Trenkenschuh	319	0.2				
REP					271	0.2	0.0
RRP					194	0.1	
ÖDP					153	0.1	
Centre					100	0.1	0.0
DVU					93	0.1	
BüSo					21	0.0	0.0
MLPD					19	0.0	0.0
PSG					15	0.0	0.0
Informal votes		2,203			1,856		
Total valid votes		164,831			165,178		
Turnout		167,034	72.2	▼7.2			
CDU hold	Majority	31,391	19.1	▲15.0			

=== 2005 election ===
Federal election (2005): Rhein-Sieg-Kreis I
Notes:	Blue background denotes the winner of the electorate vote. Pink background denotes a candidate elected from their party list. Yellow background denotes an electorate win by a list member, or other incumbent. A ✓ or ✗ denotes status of any incumbent, win or lose respectively.						
Party	Candidate	Votes	%	±%	Party votes	%	±%
CDU	Elisabeth Winkelmeier-Becker	80,894	45.5	▲4.6	67,060	37.7	▼1.0
SPD	✗ Uwe Göllner	73,513	41.4	▼2.8	61,692	34.7	▼3.0
FDP	Dieter Ber	7,780	4.4	▼3.0	21,733	12.2	▲1.2
Greens	Christian Gunkel	7,311	4.1	▼1.2	14,605	8.2	▼1.1
Left	Alfons Korell	5,615	3.2	▲2.4	7,670	4.3	▲3.3
NPD	Stephan Meise	1,580	0.9	▲0.3	1,574	0.9	▲0.5
From Now on... Democracy Through Referendum	Helmut Fleck	999	0.6	▲0.5	582	0.3	
Tierschutzpartei					870	0.5	▲0.1
Familie					669	0.4	▲0.2
GRAUEN					622	0.3	▲0.1
PBC					380	0.2	▲0.2
REP					300	0.2	
Centre					83	0.0	
Socialist Equality Party					50	0.0	
BüSo					39	0.0	
MLPD					34	0.0	0.0
Informal votes		1,993			1,722		
Total valid votes		177,692			177,963		
Turnout		179,685	79.3	▼2.3			
CDU gain from SPD	Majority	7,381	4.1				
