= Merzenich station =

Railway station in Germany

Merzenich
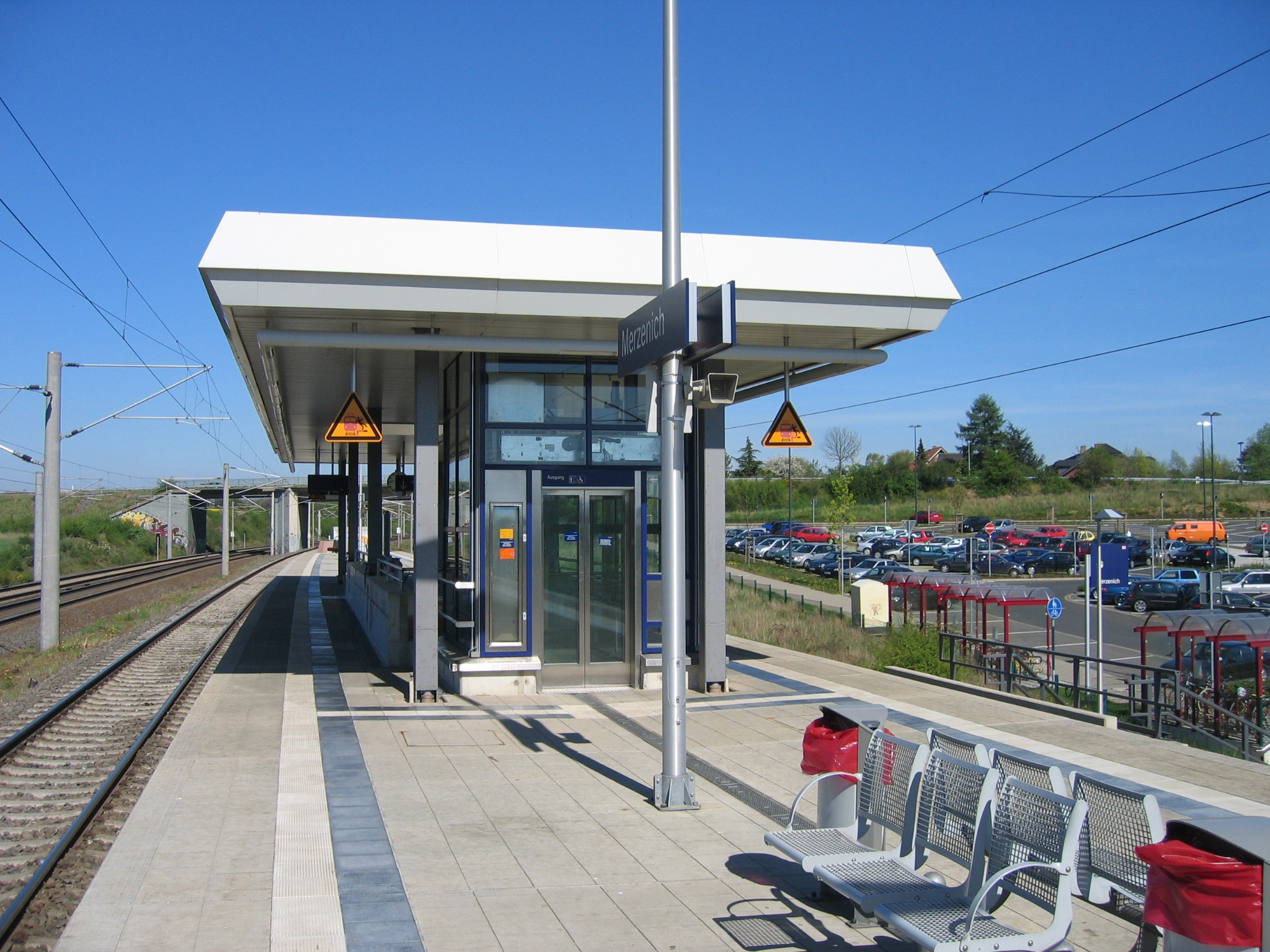

General information
- Location: Obererz 1, Merzenich, North Rhine-Westphalia; Germany
- Coordinates: 50°50′24″N 6°31′05″E
- Line: Cologne–Aachen

Construction
- Accessible: Yes

Other information
- Station code: 5485
- DS100 code: KMEZ
- IBNR: 8003990
- Category: 5
- Fare zone: AVV: 73; VRS: 3680 (AVV transitional tariff)
- Website: www.bahnhof.de

History
- Opened: 15 June 2003

Services
Preceding station	Cologne S-Bahn	Following station
Düren Terminus	S19	Buir towards Au (Sieg)
Location

Merzenich is a railway station situated at Merzenich, Kreis Düren in the German state of North Rhine-Westphalia on the Cologne–Aachen railway. It opened on 29 April 2003 with the S-Bahn tracks. It has an island platform and a large commuter parking area.

It is served by the S19 service between Düren and Blankenberg (Sieg), Herchen or Au (Sieg) on working days and between Düren and Hennef (Sieg) on Saturdays, Sundays and public holidays. It is classified by Deutsche Bahn as a category 5 station.
