= Ottersbach =

River in Germany

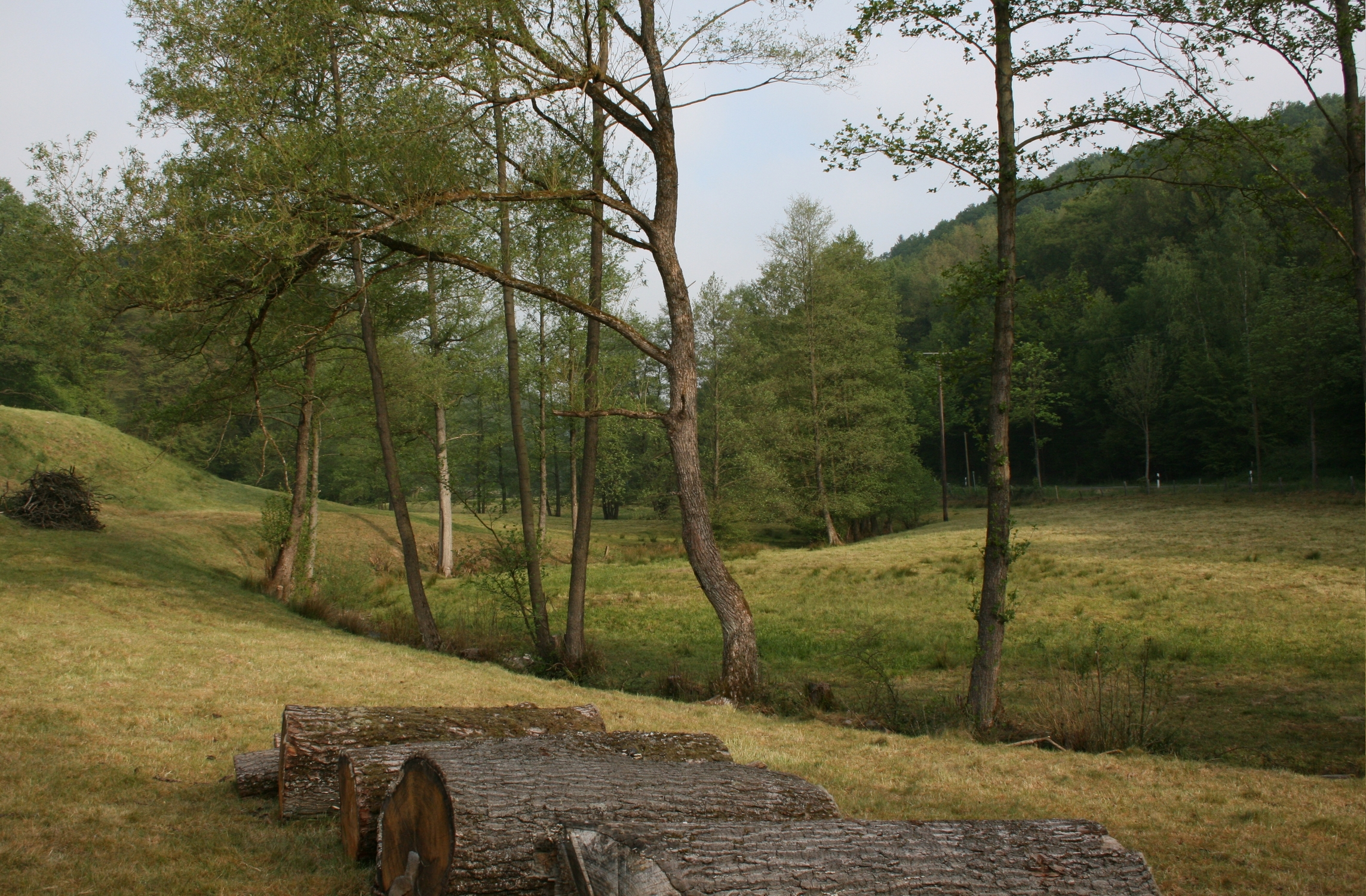

Location
- Country: Germany
- States: North Rhine-Westphalia

Physical characteristics
- Mouth
  - location: Sieg
  - coordinates: 50.7712°N 7.4784°E

Basin features
- Progression: Sieg→ Rhine→ North Sea

Ottersbach is a small river of North Rhine-Westphalia, Germany. It is 6.8 km (4.2 mi) long and flows as a right tributary into the Sieg near Eitorf.

== See also ==
- List of rivers of North Rhine-Westphalia
