= Merzenich =

- Municipality
- Coat of arms

- Location of Merzenich within Düren district
- Interactive map of Merzenich
- Location within Germany Location within North Rhine-Westphalia
- Coordinates: 50°50′N 06°32′E
- Country: Germany
- State: North Rhine-Westphalia
- Admin. region: Köln
- District: Düren
- Subdivisions: 4

Government
  - Mayor (2020–25): Georg Gelhausen (CDU)

Area
  - Total: 37.92 km^{2} (14.64 sq mi)
- Elevation: 134 m (440 ft)

Population (2025-12-31)
  - Total: 10,509
  - Density: 277.1/km^{2} (717.8/sq mi)
- Time zone: UTC+01:00 (CET)
  - Summer (DST): UTC+02:00 (CEST)
- Postal codes: 52399
- Dialling codes: 02421
- Vehicle registration: DN
- Website: www.gemeinde-merzenich.de

Merzenich (German pronunciation: [ˈmɛʁtsənɪç]) is a municipality in the district of Düren in the state of North Rhine-Westphalia, Germany. It is located approximately 4 km northeast of Düren.

== History ==
With only five villages Merzenich the most clear municipality in the district of Düren. Around 10,000 people live in the central town of Merzenich, in Golzheim, Girbelsrath and Morschenich-Neu. This is the relocation site where a large proportion of the people who were previously native to Morschenich now live.

Due to the progress of the Inden opencast mine, the village had to be completely evacuated. However, due to the premature withdrawal from lignite mining, the abandoned village will not be excavated after all. Merzenich became widely known during the – ultimately successful - demonstrations for the preservation of the rest of the Hambach Forest.

Merzenich is located northeast of Düren in the fertile Jülich Börde. It is therefore no coincidence that the largest company at the site is the family-run fruit and vegetable refiner Stollenwerk. Up to one million portions of a wide variety of crops are processed in Girbelsrath every day and bottled ready for sale. Thanks to the new Merzenich junction of the A4 motorway, food will soon be rolling into Germany and abroad. Merzenich is also connected to the Düren-Cologne railway line.

== Population ==
Historical population

Year	Pop.	±% p.a.
1965	5,821	—
1970	6,301	+1.60%
1975	7,208	+2.73%
1980	7,404	+0.54%
1985	7,795	+1.03%
1990	8,328	+1.33%
1995	8,873	+1.28%

Year	Pop.	±% p.a.
2000	9,743	+1.89%
2005	9,908	+0.34%
2010	9,769	−0.28%
2015	9,950	+0.37%
2020	9,968	+0.04%
2025	10,509	+1.06%

Source: Landesdatabank Nordrhein-Westfalen

== `Mayor ==
Georg Gelhausen (CDU) was elected in September 2015, and re-elected in September 2020.

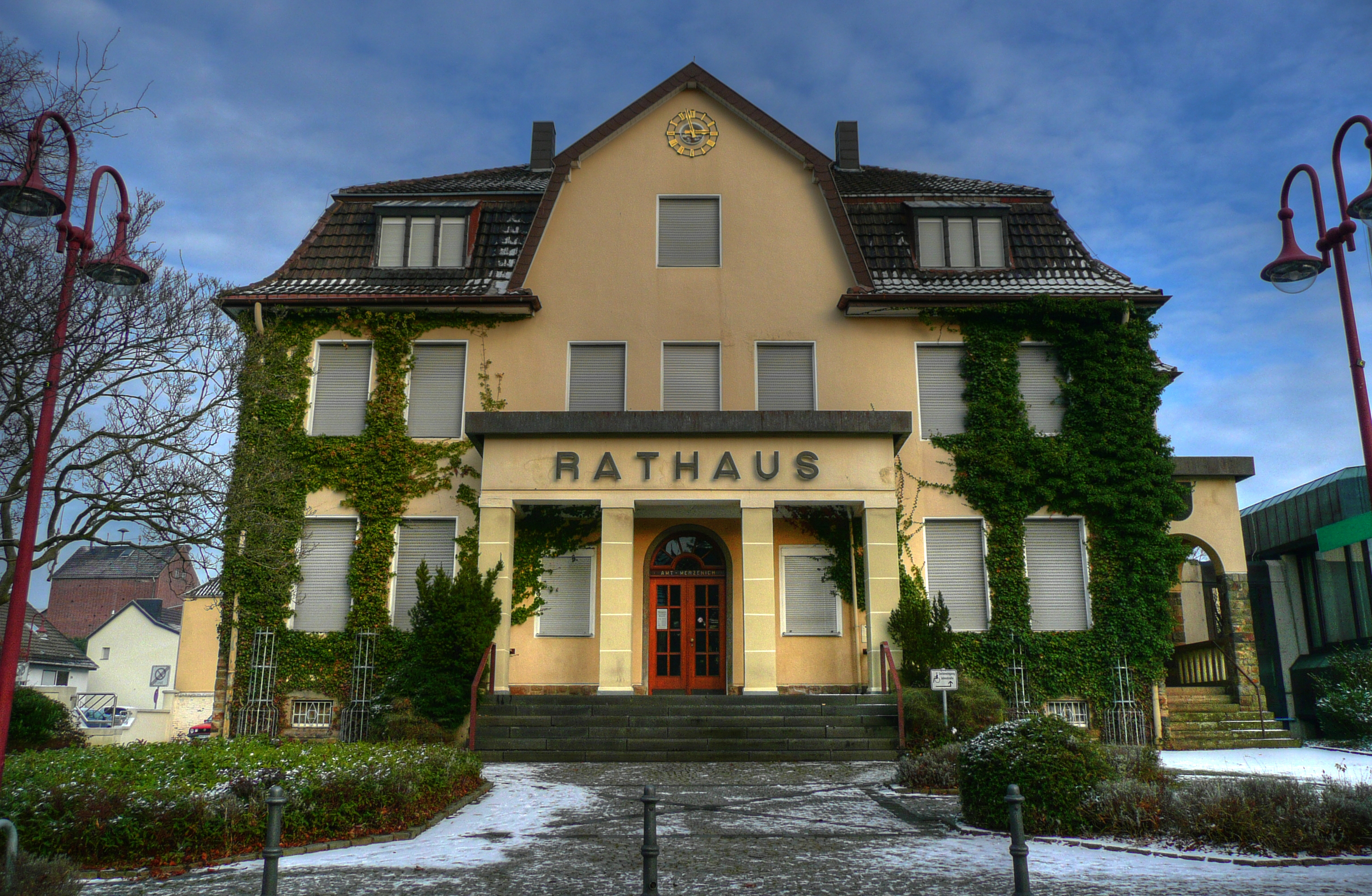
Merzenich Town hall

== Transport links ==
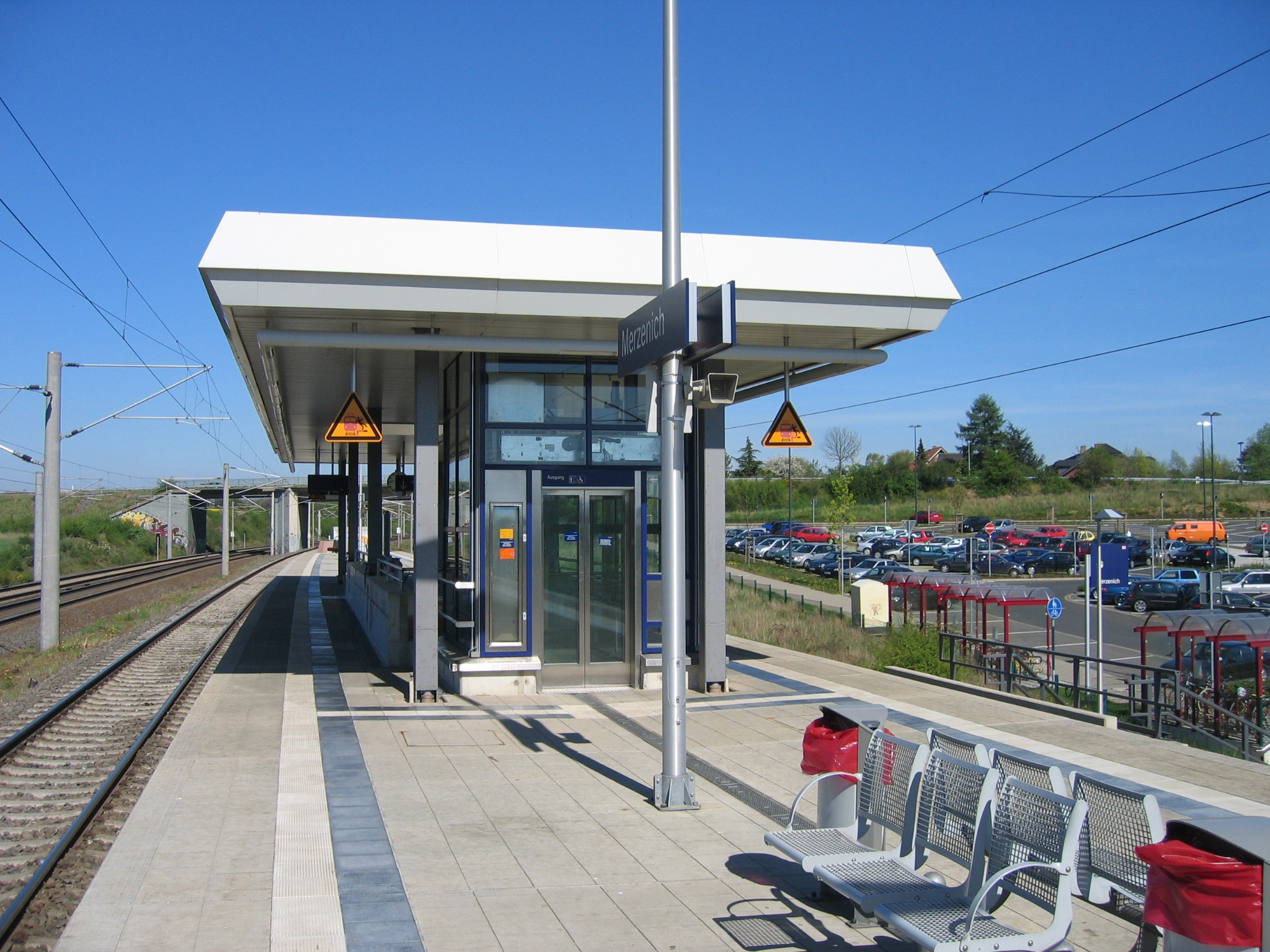
Merzenich station

Merzenich station is served by the trains of the line S19 of the Cologne S-Bahn and located in the area of the fare association Rheinland-Tarif.
