= Alexander Neu =

German politician

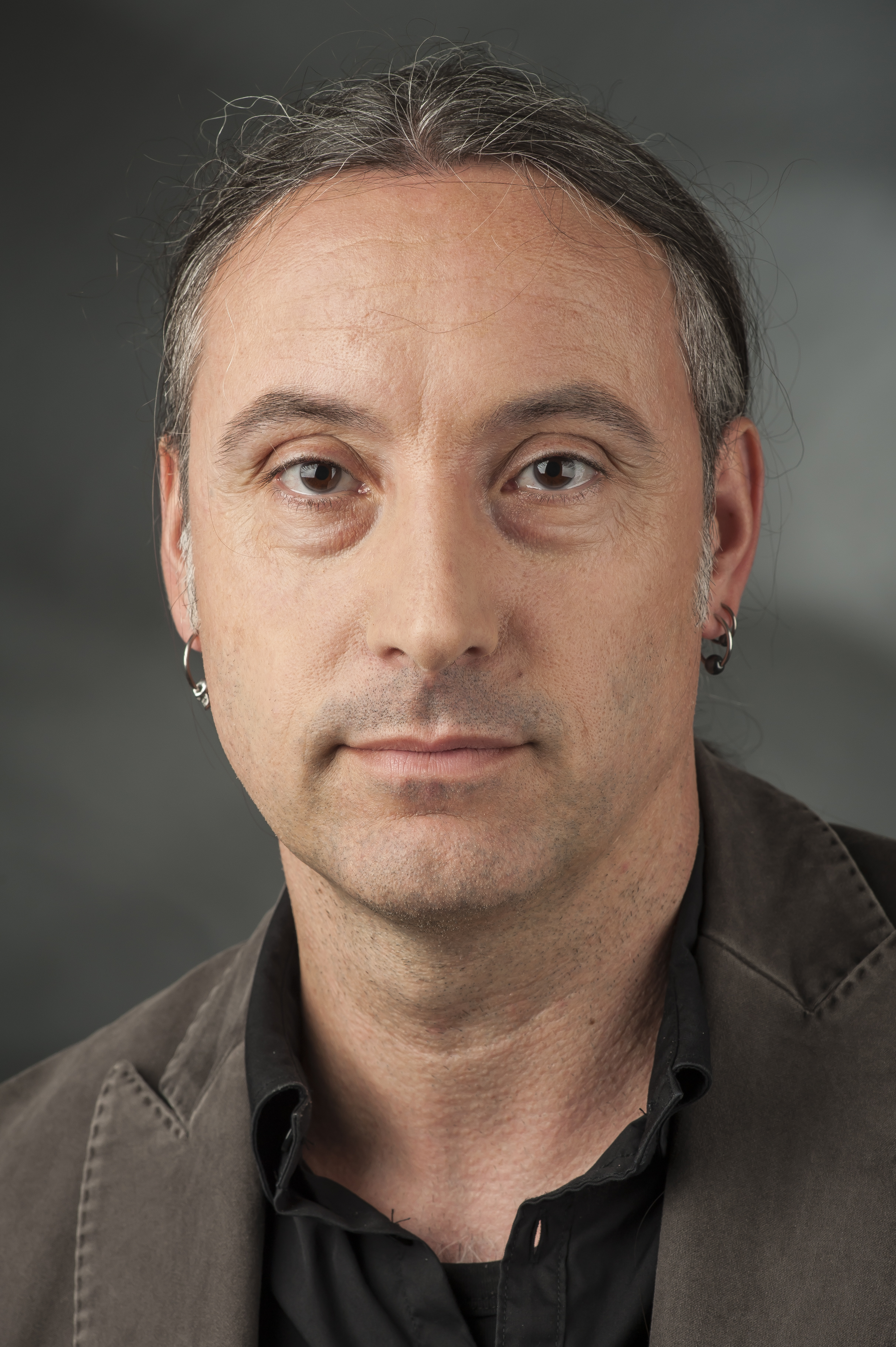
- Alexander Neu in 2013

Member of the Bundestag
- In office 2013–2021

Personal details
- Born: 10 March 1969 (age 57) Eitorf, West Germany (now Germany)
- Party: The Left

Alexander Neu (born 10 March 1969) is a German politician. Born in Eitorf, North Rhine-Westphalia, he represents The Left. Alexander Neu served as a member of the Bundestag from the state of North Rhine-Westphalia from 2013 to 2021.

== Life ==
Alexander Neu is a political scientist. He became a member of the Bundestag after the 2013 German federal election, contesting Rhein-Sieg-Kreis I. He was a member of the defense committee. He was his group's representative for Eastern Europe.

He lost his seat at the 2021 German federal election.
