= Elisabeth Winkelmeier-Becker =

German lawyer and politician (born 1962)

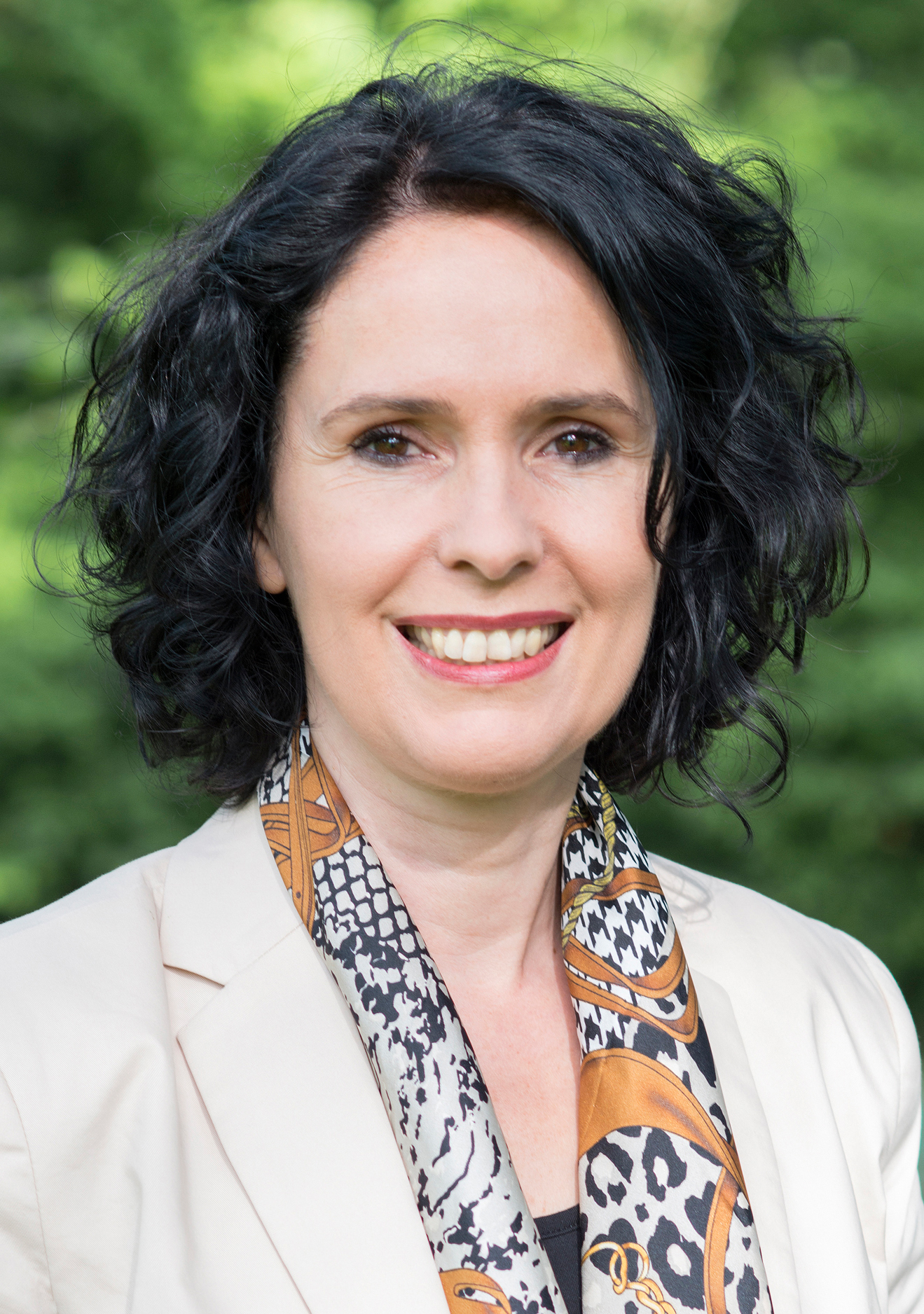
- Winkelmeier-Becker in 2013

Member of the Bundestag for Rhein-Sieg-Kreis I
- Incumbent
- Assumed office 2005
- Preceded by: Uwe Göllner

Personal details
- Born: Elisabeth Winkelmeier; 15 September 1962 (age 64) Troisdorf, West Germany (now Germany)
- Party: CDU
- Education: University of Bonn

Elisabeth Winkelmeier-Becker (née Winkelmeier, born 15 September 1962) is a German lawyer and politician of the Christian Democratic Union (CDU) who has been serving as a member of the Bundestag from Rhein-Sieg-Kreis I in the state of North Rhine-Westphalia since 2005.

From 2019 to 2021, Winkelmeiner-Becker also served as Parliamentary State Secretary at the Federal Ministry of Economic Affairs and Energy under Minister Peter Altmaier in the government of Chancellor Angela Merkel.

== Political career ==
Winkelmeier-Becker first became a member of the Bundestag in the 2005 German federal election. In parliament, she has served on the Committee on Legal Affairs and Consumer Protection (2005–2019); the Committee on Family Affairs, Senior Citizens, Women and Youth (2005–2013); and the Parliamentary Advisory Board on Sustainable Development (2005–2009).

In the negotiations to form a Grand Coalition of Chancellor Angela Merkel's Christian Democrats (CDU together with the Bavarian CSU) and the SPD following the 2013 federal elections, Winkelmeier-Becker was part of the CDU/CSU delegation in the working group on families, women and equality, led by Annette Widmann-Mauz and Manuela Schwesig. In similar negotiations following the 2017 federal elections, she was part of the working group on internal and legal affairs, led by Thomas de Maizière, Stephan Mayer and Heiko Maas.

In 2018, Winkelmeier-Becker joined the parliamentary body in charge of appointing judges to the Highest Courts of Justice, namely the Federal Court of Justice (BGH), the Federal Administrative Court (BVerwG), the Federal Fiscal Court (BFH), the Federal Labour Court (BAG), and the Federal Social Court (BSG).

From 2019 to 2021, Winkelmeier-Becker served as Parliamentary State Secretary for Economic Affairs and Energy. In this capacity, she was also the ministry's Special Coordinator for the Extractive Industries Transparency Initiative (EITI).

Following the 2021 elections, Winkelmeier-Becker became the chairwoman of the Committee on Legal Affairs.

In the negotiations to form a coalition government under the leadership of Minister-President of North Rhine-Westphalia Hendrik Wüst following the 2022 state elections, Winkelmeier-Becker was part of her party’s delegation.

== Other activities ==
=== Corporate boards ===
- Deutsche Bahn, Member of the Supervisory Board (2020–2022)
- German Investment Corporation (DEG), ex-officio Member of the Supervisory Board (2018–2021)

=== Non-profit organizations ===
- German Foundation for International Legal Cooperation (IRZ), Member of the Board of Trustees (since 2022)
- Magnus Hirschfeld Foundation, Alternate Member of the Board of Trustees (since 2022)
- Haus der Geschichte, Member of the Board of Trustees (since 2022)

=== Political Sponsorship ===
On Dec 15, 2022, Mrs Winkelmeier-Becker declared that she politically supports Eshragh Najafabadi, an Iranian athlete seized by IRGC suppression forces during Mahsa Amini protests.

== Political positions ==
In June 2017, Winkelmeier-Becker abstained from a parliamentary vote on Germany's introduction of same-sex marriage.

In 2019, Winkelmeier-Becker joined 14 members of her parliamentary group who, in an open letter, called for the party to rally around Merkel and party chairwoman Annegret Kramp-Karrenbauer amid criticism voiced by conservatives Friedrich Merz and Roland Koch.

In January 2025, Winkelmeier-Becker was one of 12 CDU lawmakers who opted not to back a draft law on tightening immigration policy sponsored by their own leader Friedrich Merz, who had pushed for the law despite warnings from party colleagues that he risked being tarnished with the charge of voting alongside the far-right Alternative for Germany.
