= Kerpen =

- Town
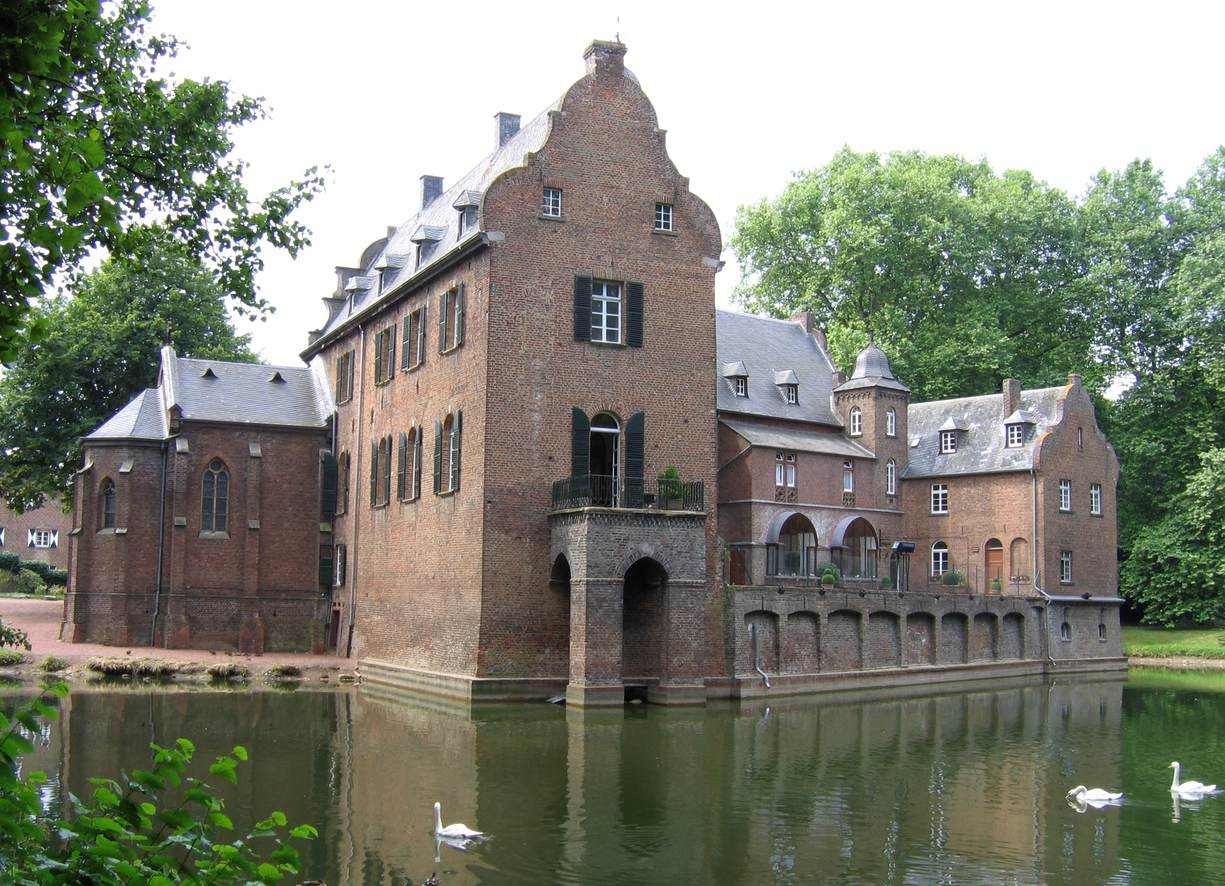
- Bergerhausen Castle

- Coat of arms

- Location of Kerpen within Rhein-Erft-Kreis district
- Interactive map of Kerpen
- Location within Germany Location within North Rhine-Westphalia
- Coordinates: 50°52′19″N 6°41′46″E
- Country: Germany
- State: North Rhine-Westphalia
- Admin. region: Köln
- District: Rhein-Erft-Kreis
- Subdivisions: 9

Government
  - Mayor (2025–30): Thomas Jurczyk (SPD)

Area
  - Total: 113.96 km^{2} (44.00 sq mi)
- Elevation: 95 m (312 ft)

Population (2025-12-31)
  - Total: 66,377
  - Density: 582.46/km^{2} (1,508.6/sq mi)
- Time zone: UTC+01:00 (CET)
  - Summer (DST): UTC+02:00 (CEST)
- Postal codes: 50169, 50170, 50171
- Dialling codes: 02237 (Balkhausen, Brüggen, Kerpen, Türnich), 02273 (Horrem, Neu-Bottenbroich, Sindorf), 02275 (Blatzheim, Buir, Manheim, Manheim-neu)
- Vehicle registration: BM
- Website: https://www.stadt-kerpen.de/

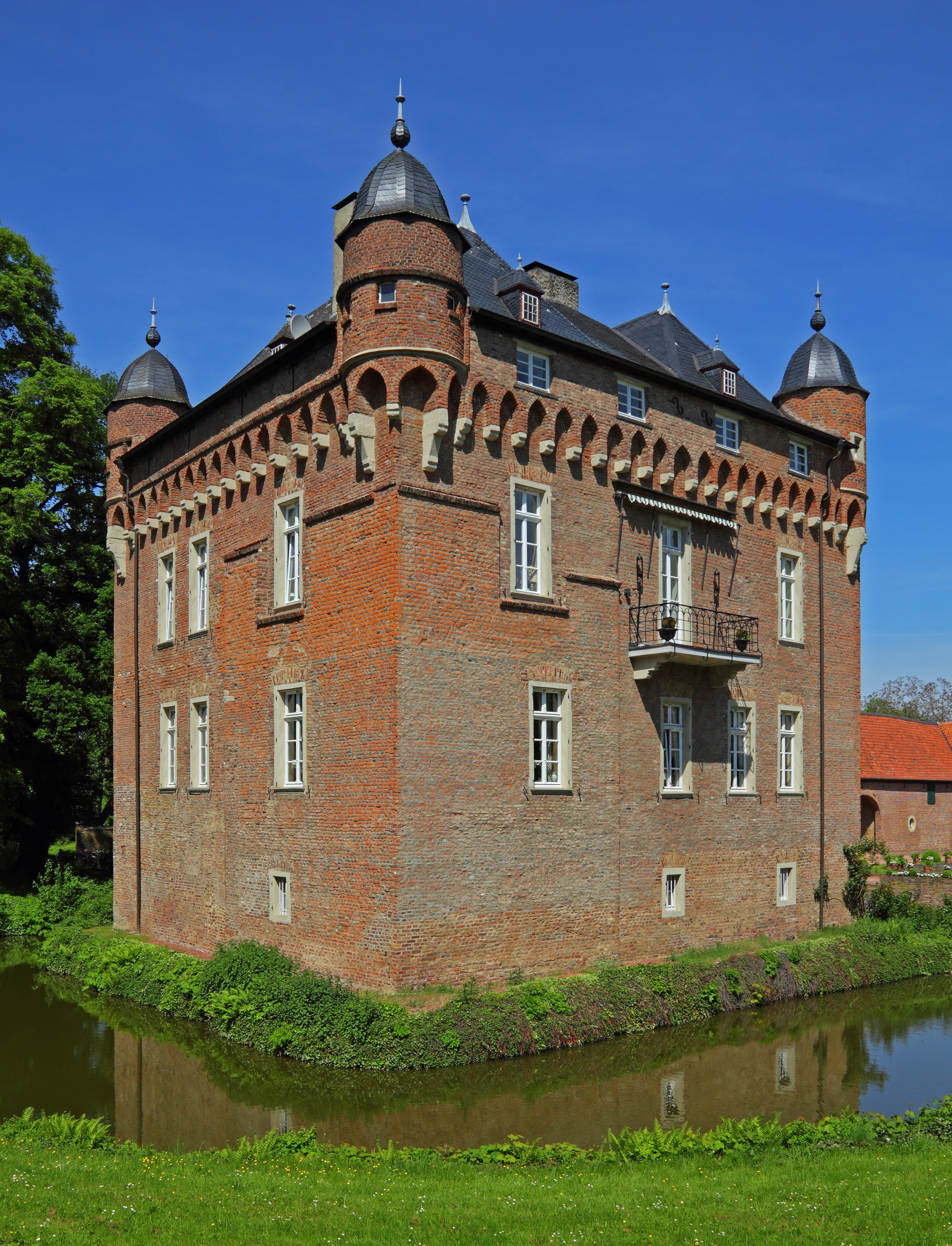
Loersfeld Palace

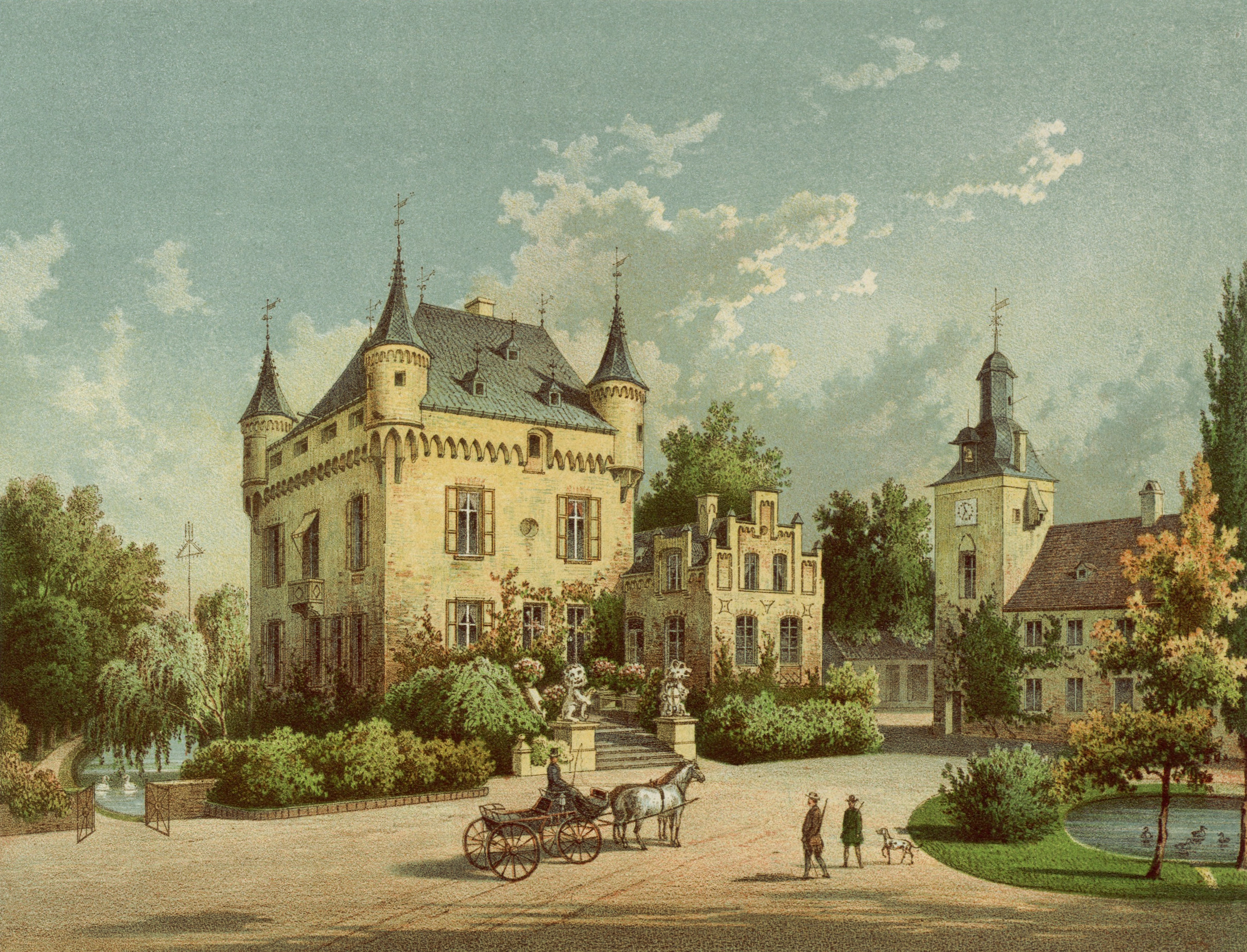
Palace Loersfeld around 1860, Edition by Alexander Duncker

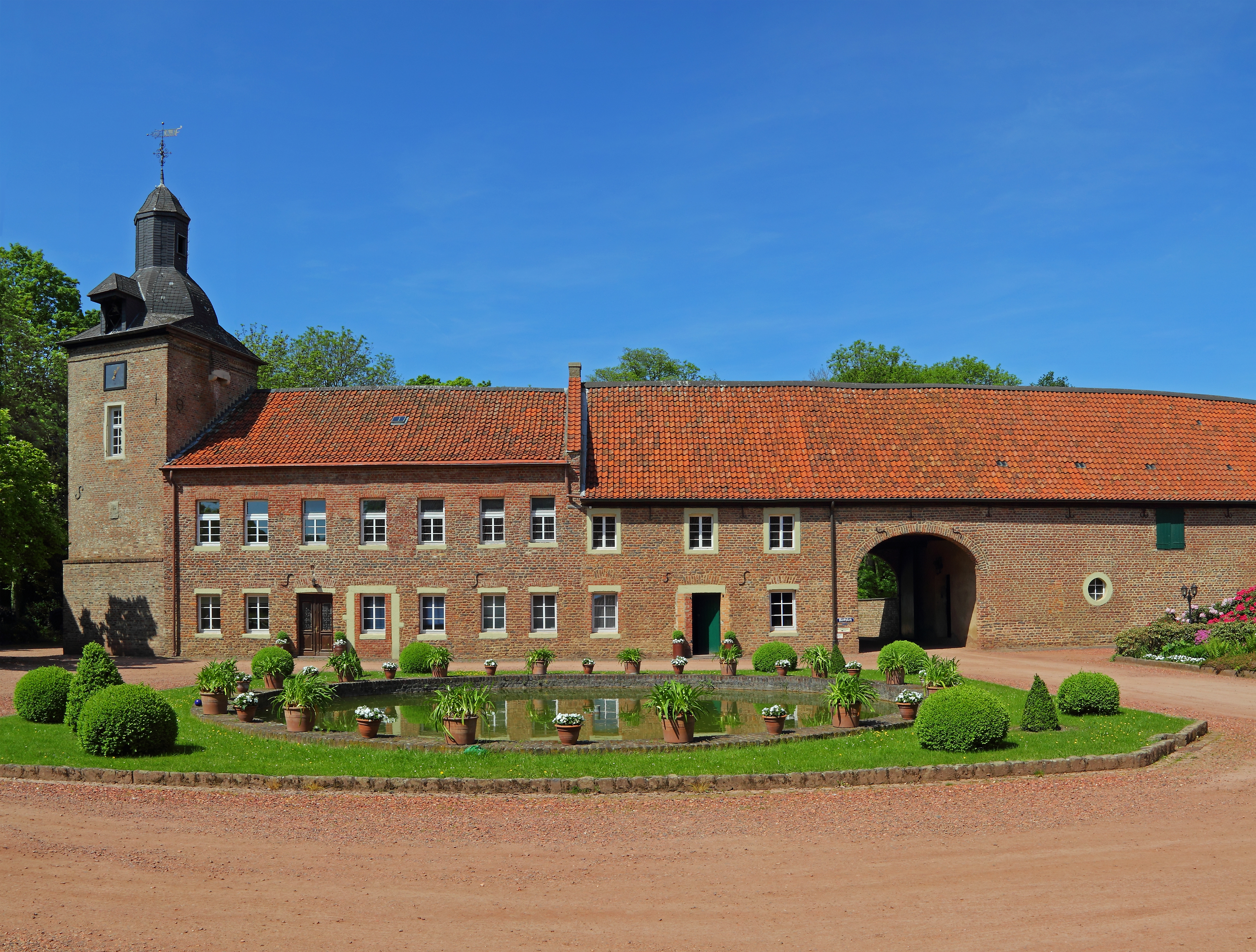
Loersfeld Palace

Kerpen (German: [ˈkɛʁpn̩]; Ripuarian: Kerpe) is the most populated town in the Rhein-Erft-Kreis (North Rhine-Westphalia, Germany). It is located about 20 kilometres southwest from Cologne. As of 2025, Kerpen has a total population of 66,377.

== Division of the town ==
The town of Kerpen was created in 1975, when the previously independent municipalities Balkhausen, Blatzheim, Brüggen, Buir, Horrem, Kerpen, Manheim, Mödrath, Sindorf and Türnich were merged.

== Population ==
Historical population

Year	Pop.	±% p.a.
1965	37,588	—
1970	42,634	+2.55%
1975	50,392	+3.40%
1980	54,723	+1.66%
1985	54,768	+0.02%
1990	57,337	+0.92%
1995	61,998	+1.58%

Year	Pop.	±% p.a.
2000	63,135	+0.36%
2005	64,348	+0.38%
2010	64,602	+0.08%
2015	65,477	+0.27%
2020	65,802	+0.10%
2025	66,377	+0.17%

Source: Landesdatabank Nordrhein-Westfalen

== Monuments ==
- Burg Bergerhausen
- Burg Loersfeld
- Schloss Türnich

== Notable people ==
- Adolph Kolping (1813–1865), Catholic priest and social reformer
- Wolfgang von Trips (1928–1961), Formula One motor racing driver
- Karlheinz Stockhausen (1928–2007), pioneer of electronic music composition
- Franz-Peter Hofmeister, Olympic medalist in the 4 × 400 m relay
- Michael Schumacher, 7-time Formula One world champion
- Ralf Schumacher, brother of Michael, both have emulated von Trips in achieving success in Formula One
- Patrice Bart-Williams is an acclaimed reggae artist
- Eko Fresh is an acclaimed hip hop artist

== Education ==
In 2008, Gymnasium der Stadt Kerpen was considered the largest school in Germany.

== Twin towns – sister cities ==
Kerpen is twinned with:

- St. Vith, Belgium (1975)
- Oświęcim, Poland (1997)

== Transport links ==
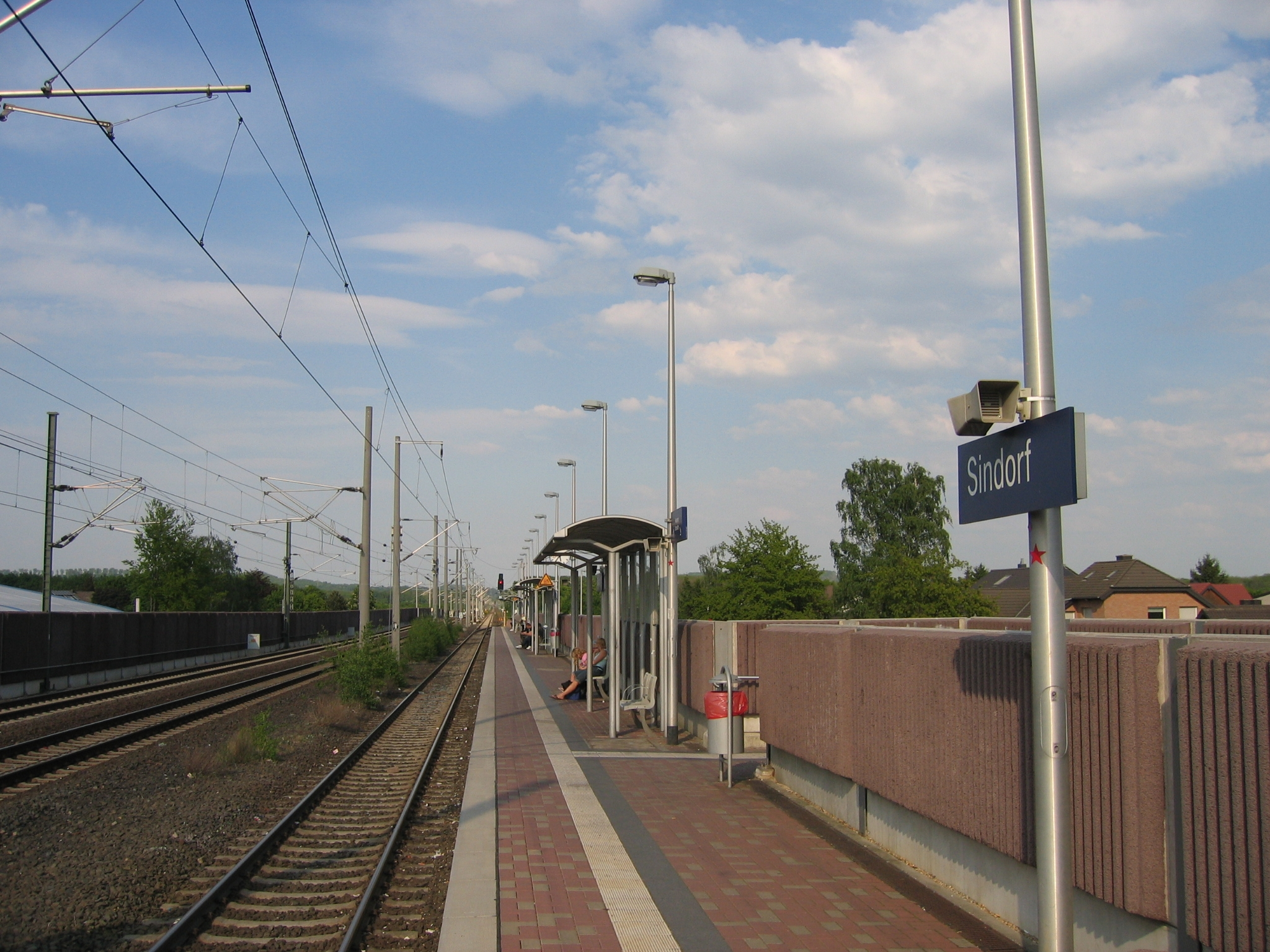
Sindorf station

Horrem station on Winter

Line S19 of the Cologne S-Bahn (Cologne suburban railway) has the stations Buir and Sindorf in Kerpen. Also the Horrem station is located in Kerpen, which is served by S12 and S19 as well as the local train lines RE1 (NRW-Express), RE9 (Rhein-Sieg-Express) and RB38 (Erft Railway). The town is located in the area of the fare association Rheinland-Tarif.
