= Hennef im Siegbogen station =

Railway station in Germany

Hennef Im Siegbogen
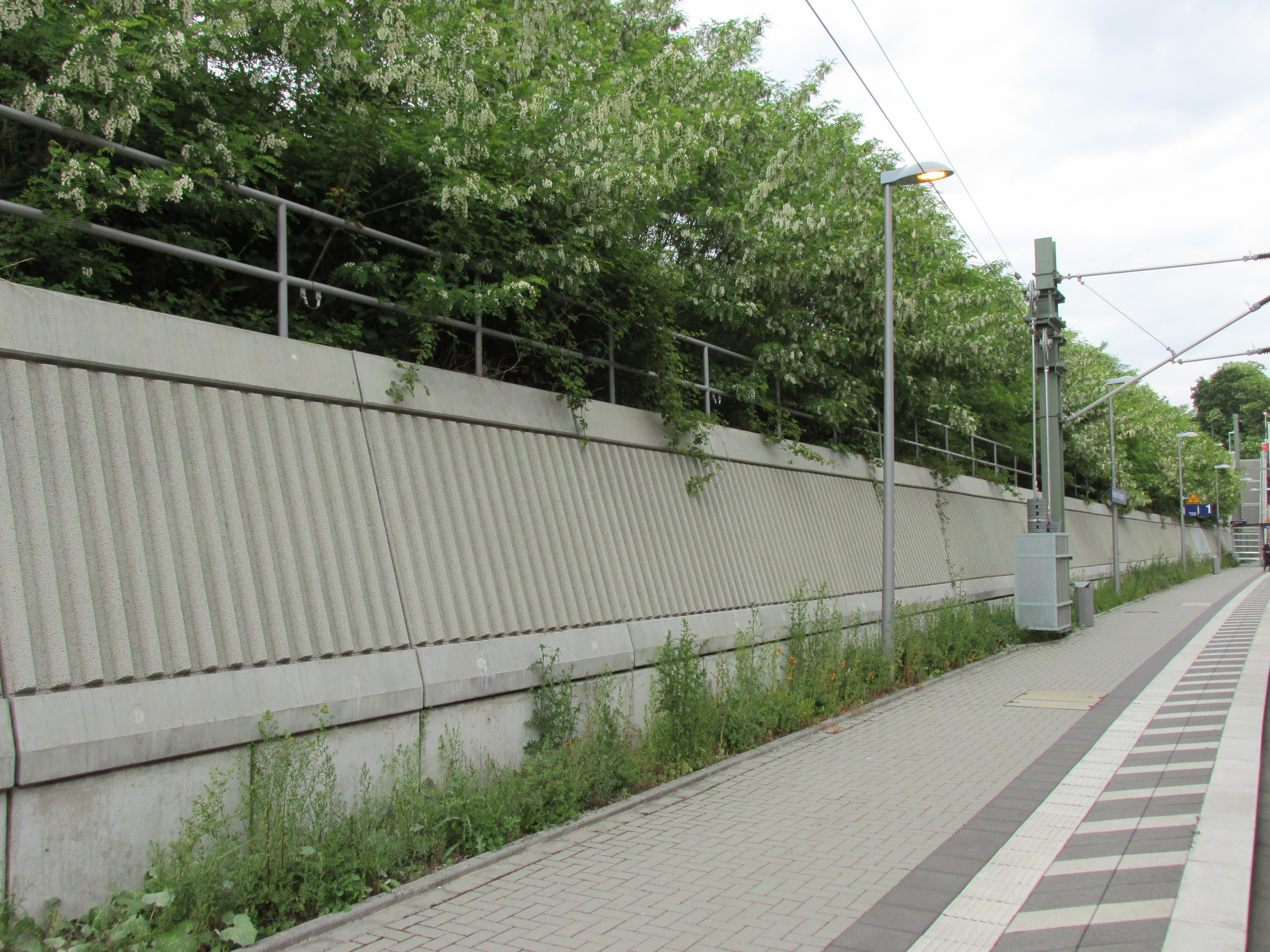

General information
- Location: Bodenstraße, Hennef Im Siegbogen, Hennef, NRW; Germany
- Coordinates: 50°46′23″N 7°18′50″E
- Lines: Cologne–Siegen (KBS 450.12)
- Platforms: 2

Construction
- Accessible: Yes

Other information
- Station code: 2166
- DS100 code: KHES
- IBNR: 8002775
- Category: 6
- Fare zone: VRS: 2570
- Website: www.bahnhof.de

History
- Opened: 11 December 2011

Services
Preceding station	Cologne S-Bahn	Following station
Hennef (Sieg) towards Horrem	S12	Blankenberg (Sieg) towards Au (Sieg)
Hennef (Sieg) towards Düren	S19	Blankenberg (Sieg) towards Au (Sieg)
Location
- Location within North Rhine-Westphalia

Hennef im Siegbogen station is a through station in the town of Hennef in the German state of North Rhine-Westphalia. The station was opened on 11 December 2011 on a section of the Sieg Railway, opened by the Cologne-Minden Railway Company (German: Cöln-Mindener Eisenbahn-Gesellschaft, CME) between Hennef (Sieg) and Eitorf on 1 August 1860. It has two platform tracks and is classified by Deutsche Bahn as a category 6 station.

The station is served by S-Bahn S 12 services between Köln-Ehrenfeld and Au (Sieg) hourly and two S 19 services on weekdays between Düren and Blankenberg (Sieg), Herchen or Au (Sieg). Two S 12 services an hour operate on Sunday between Köln-Ehrenfeld and Au (Sieg). No S 19 services operate on Sunday.
