= Sindorf station =

Railway station in Germany

Sindorf
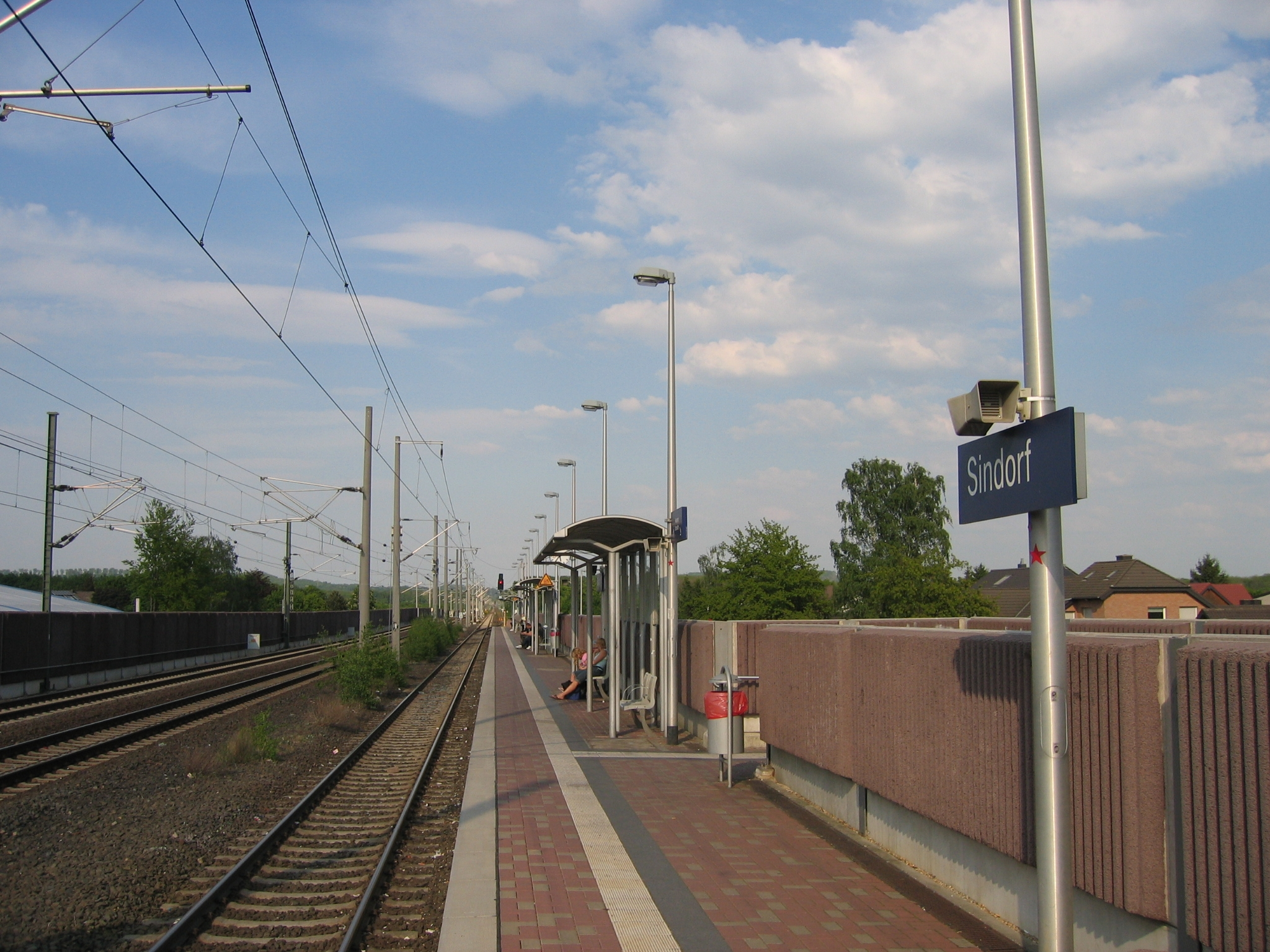

General information
- Location: Schulze Delitzsch Str. 8, Sindorf, NRW; Germany
- Coordinates: 50°54′12″N 6°40′50″E
- Lines: Cologne–Aachen (KBS 450.12)
- Platforms: 1

Construction
- Accessible: Yes

Other information
- Station code: 5864
- DS100 code: KSIU
- IBNR: 8005575
- Category: 6
- Fare zone: VRS: 2870
- Website: www.bahnhof.de

History
- Opened: 1912 (original site); 2002 (current site)

Services
Preceding station	Cologne S-Bahn	Following station
Buir towards Düren	S19	Horrem towards Au (Sieg)
Location
- Location within North Rhine-Westphalia

Sindorf station is a train station in the town of Sindorf in the German state of North Rhine-Westphalia on the Cologne–Aachen high-speed railway. The station is in the south-east of the Kerpen district of Sindorf and has a side platform on the south side of the S-Bahn line. This is bounded to the south by a noise barrier and the entrances and exits are at the ends of the platform.

== History ==
The original Sindorf station was opened at line-km 22.4 of the Cologne–Aachen railway in 1912 and had a platform north and south of the original line. With the commissioning of the S-Bahn tracks in 2002, the station was relocated to line-km 21.4 and redesignated as a halt. In 2004, citizens complained to the then Minister of Transport Axel Horstmann about the width of the platform. They considered that the three-metre-wide platform was too narrow, which was particularly evident in peak hour traffic. As a result, the ticket machines were relocated. After renewed criticism, the Zweckverband Nahverkehr Rheinland (Rhineland Municipal Transport Association) issued a report in early 2010, in which the maximum capacity of the platform was given as 190 people. However, a maximum of 164 people were recorded in passenger counts in the morning peak hour, which means that the requirements are formally met.

== Operations ==
The station is served by Cologne S-Bahn line by S19 between Düren and Hennef (Sieg) or Au (Sieg). This provides a service every 20 minutes to Cologne on working days and every 30 minutes on the weekend.
