= Eitorf station =

Railway station in Eitorf, Germany

Eitorf
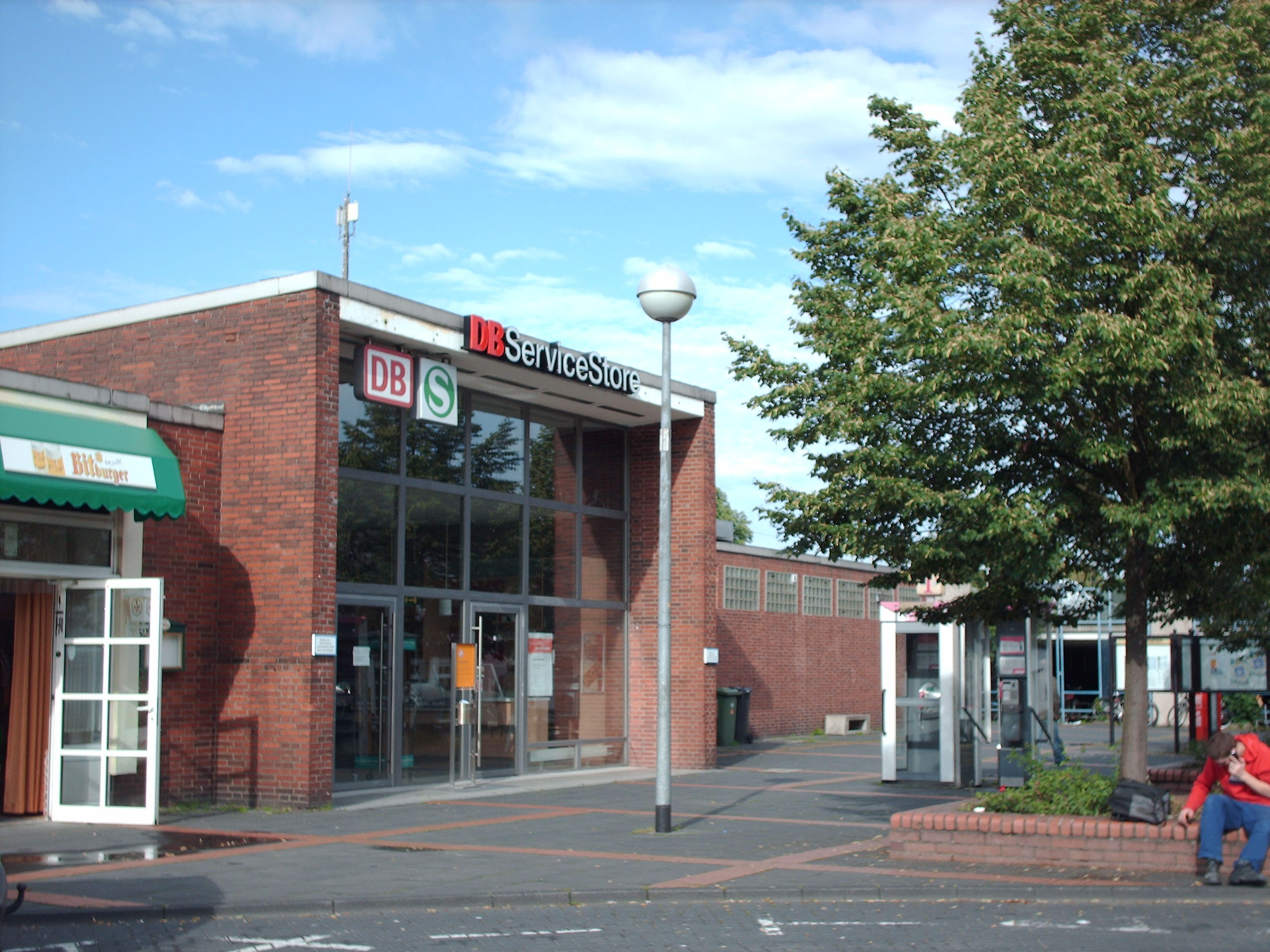
- Eitorf station

General information
- Location: Bahnhofstr. 32, Eitorf, NRW; Germany
- Coordinates: 50°46′25″N 7°26′46″E
- Line: Cologne–Siegen
- Platforms: 2

Construction
- Accessible: Assistance required for wheel chairs on S-Bahn services

Other information
- Station code: 1541
- DS100 code: KEIT
- IBNR: 8001736
- Category: 5
- Fare zone: VRS: 2591
- Website: www.bahnhof.de

History
- Opened: 1859

Services
Preceding station	DB Regio NRW	Following station
Hennef (Sieg) towards Aachen Hbf	RE 9	Herchen towards Siegen Hbf
Preceding station	Cologne S-Bahn	Following station
Merten towards Horrem	S12	Herchen towards Au (Sieg)
Merten towards Düren	S19	Herchen towards Au (Sieg)
Location
- Location within North Rhine-Westphalia

Eitorf station is located on the Sieg Railway in the town of Eitorf in the German state of North Rhine-Westphalia. It was opened in 1859 by the Cologne-Minden Railway Company with the Sieg Railway and served passenger and freight traffic.

== Station building ==
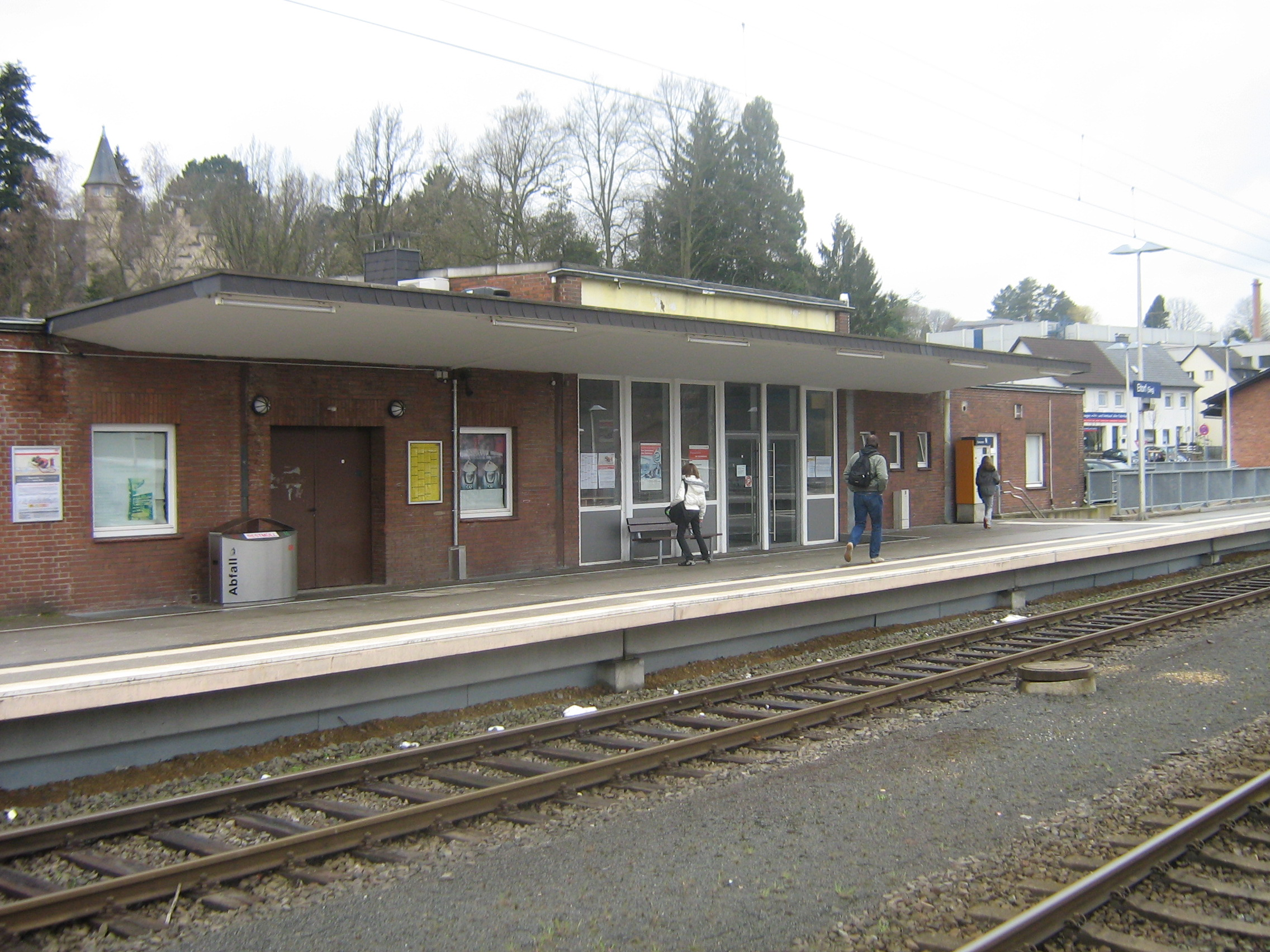
The Station building

The original station building opened in 1859 was destroyed in World War II. The current station building was opened by Deutsche Bundesbahn in 1962. The building stood empty for several years and in the meantime could not be used by passengers. Since February 2009, a bakery outlet has occupied the former ticket hall. Next to the station there is a parking station and a parking lot for park and ride commuters.

== Platforms ==
Until spring 2004, the station had a platform next to the entrance building and a platform between tracks 1 and 2, which could only be reached at ground level over track 1. Therefore, only one train at a time was allowed to stop at Eitorf and to prevent two trains crossing at the station, one train had to wait outside the station for the departure of the other.

Since the renovation of the station the side platform is now on the other side of track 2. Ramps have also been installed to give barrier-free access to the platforms for the disabled. The platforms have a height of 76 centimetres, which means that there is no access for wheelchair to the Cologne S-Bahn trains (which have an entrance height of 96 centimetres) without assistance; such assistance is available.

== Train services ==
The station is served by the Rhein-Sieg-Express (RE 9) every hour. It is also served by S-Bahn S 12 services from Köln-Ehrenfeld to Au (Sieg) and S19 services on weekdays from Düren to Herchen or Au (Sieg). The services on both lines operate hourly. In the morning peak, two extra RE 9 services run to Cologne and in the afternoon peak two extra RE 9 services run to Siegen. Freight trains rarely operate through the station. All passenger trains running through the station are operated by DB Regio Rheinland. The station is classified by Deutsche Bahn since January 2011 as a category 5 station.

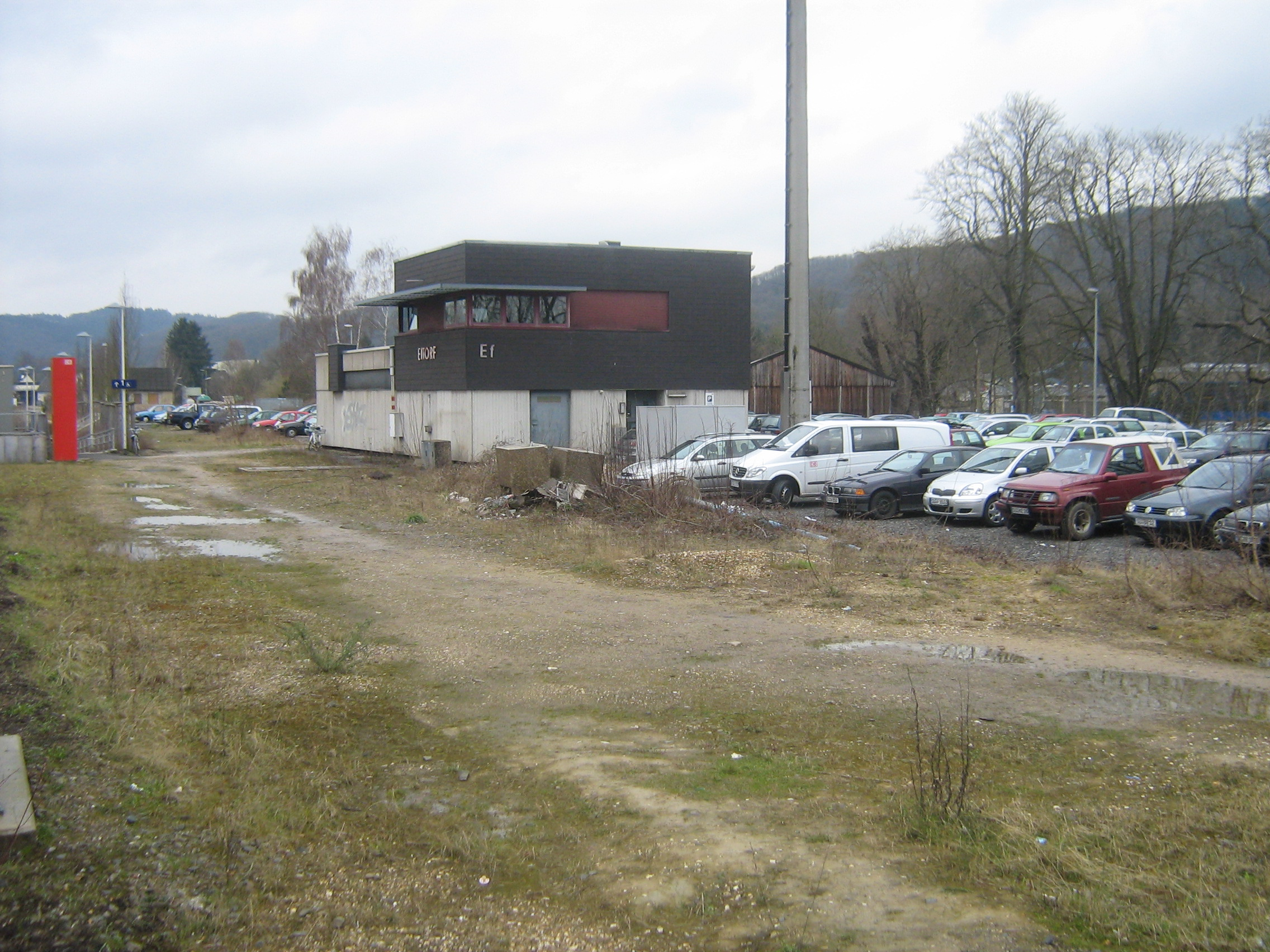
The Eitorf signal box

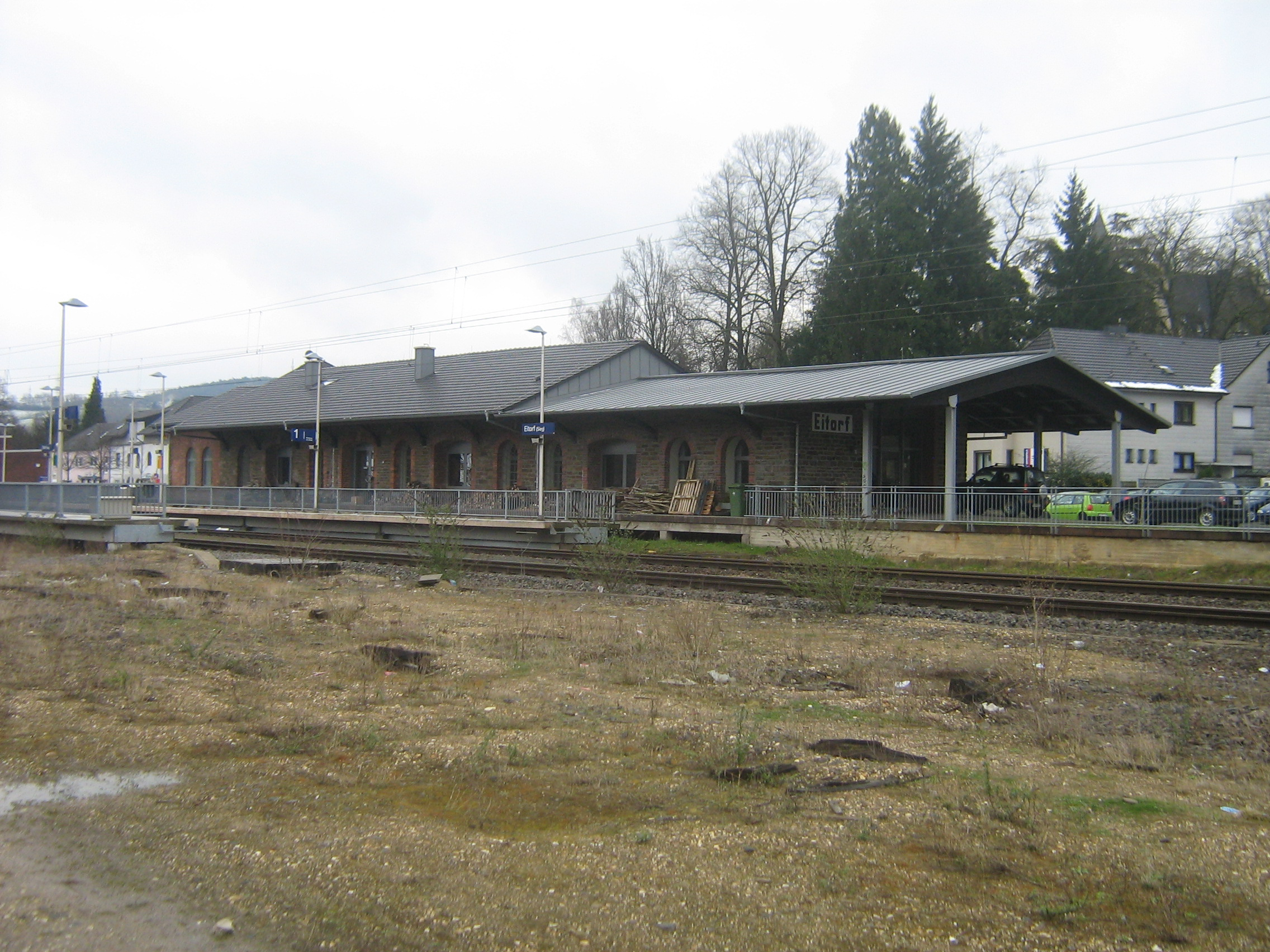
The closed freight loading ramp

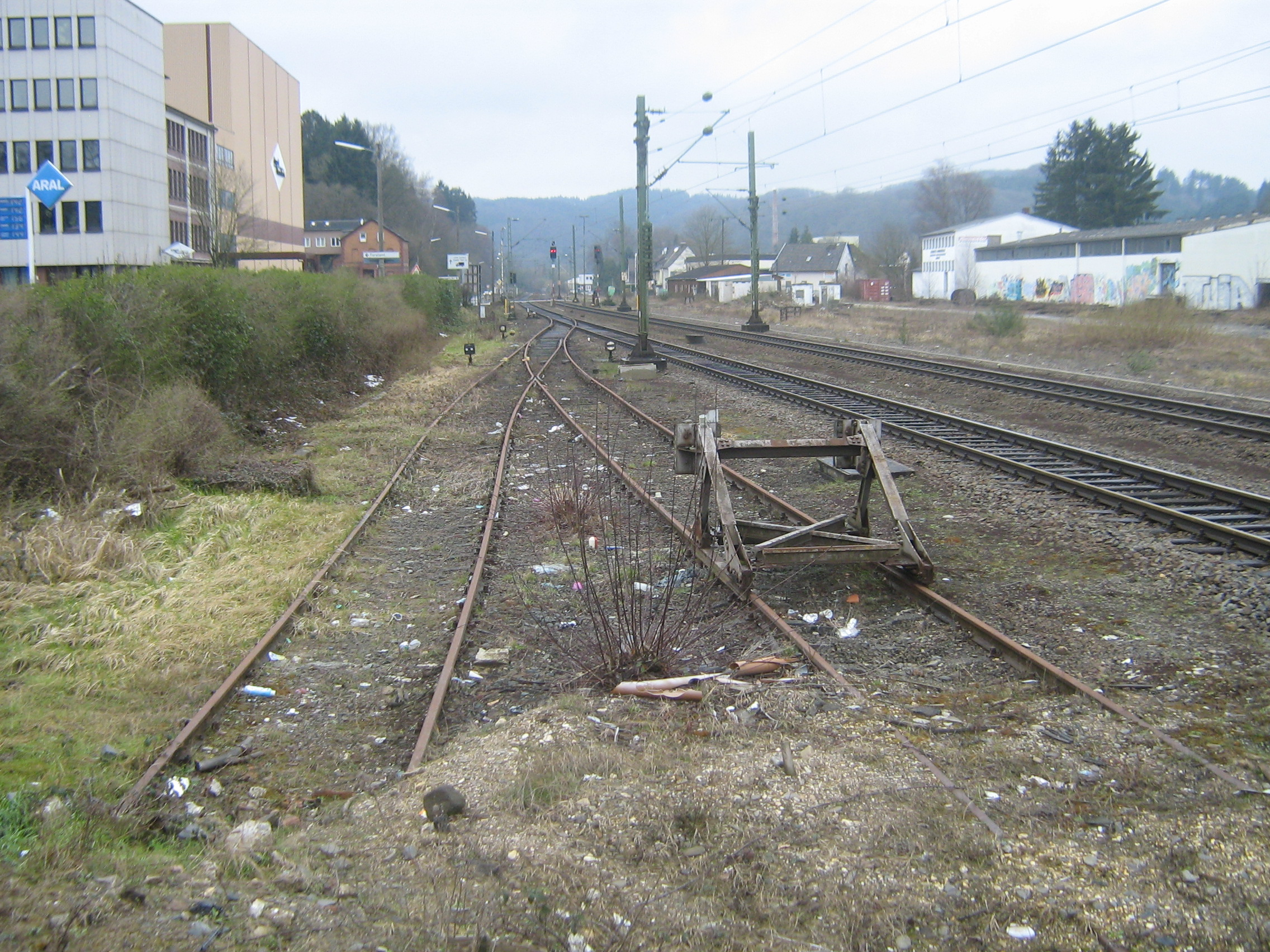
Disused freight tracks
