= Blankenberg (Sieg) station =

Railway station in Germany

Blankenberg (Sieg)
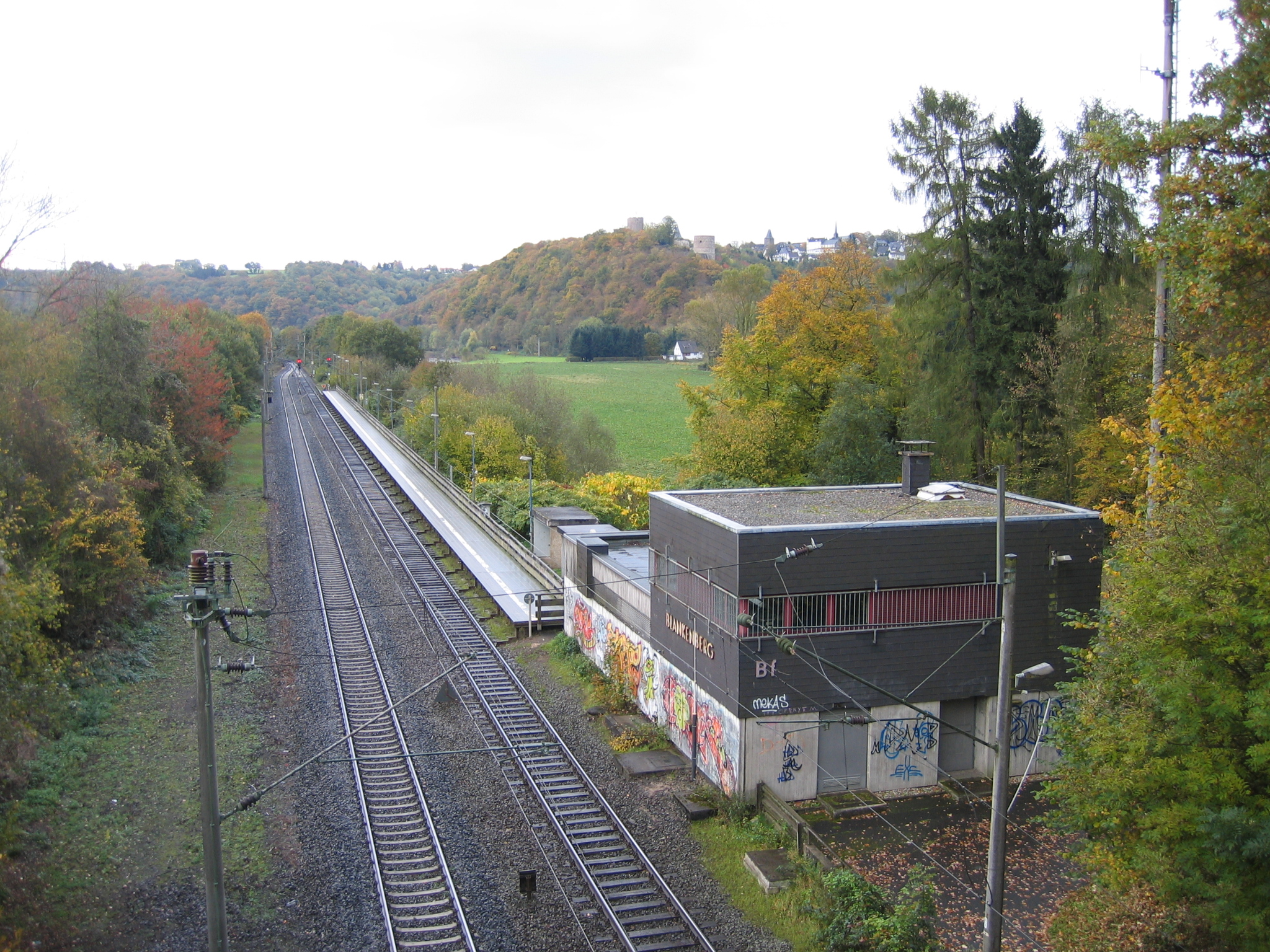

General information
- Location: Siegtalstr., Blankenberg (Sieg), Hennef, NRW; Germany
- Coordinates: 50°46′06″N 7°20′58″E
- Owner: Deutsche Bahn
- Operator: DB Netz; DB Station&Service
- Lines: Cologne–Siegen (KBS 450.12)
- Platforms: 2
- Connections: 532 592

Construction
- Accessible: Platform 1 only

Other information
- Station code: 684
- DS100 code: KBLB
- IBNR: 8001006
- Category: 6
- Fare zone: VRS: 2570
- Website: www.bahnhof.de

History
- Opened: 1860/61

Services
Preceding station	Cologne S-Bahn	Following station
Hennef im Siegbogen towards Horrem	S12	Merten (Sieg) towards Au (Sieg)
Hennef im Siegbogen towards Düren	S19	Merten (Sieg) towards Au (Sieg)
Location

Blankenberg (Sieg) station is a through station in the town of Hennef in the German state of North Rhine-Westphalia. The station was opened in 1860/61 on a section of the Sieg Railway, opened by the Cologne-Minden Railway Company (German: Cöln-Mindener Eisenbahn-Gesellschaft, CME) between Hennef (Sieg) and Eitorf on 1 August 1860. It has two platform tracks and is classified by Deutsche Bahn as a category 6 station.

The station is served by S-Bahn S 12 services between Köln-Ehrenfeld and Au (Sieg) and S 19 services on weekdays between Düren and Blankenberg, Herchen or Au (Sieg), both hourly. Two S 12 services an hour operate between Köln-Ehrenfeld and Au (Sieg) on Sunday and late nights Monday to Saturday, when no S 19 services operate.
