= Eitorf =

Municipality in North Rhine-Westphalia, Germany

- Municipality
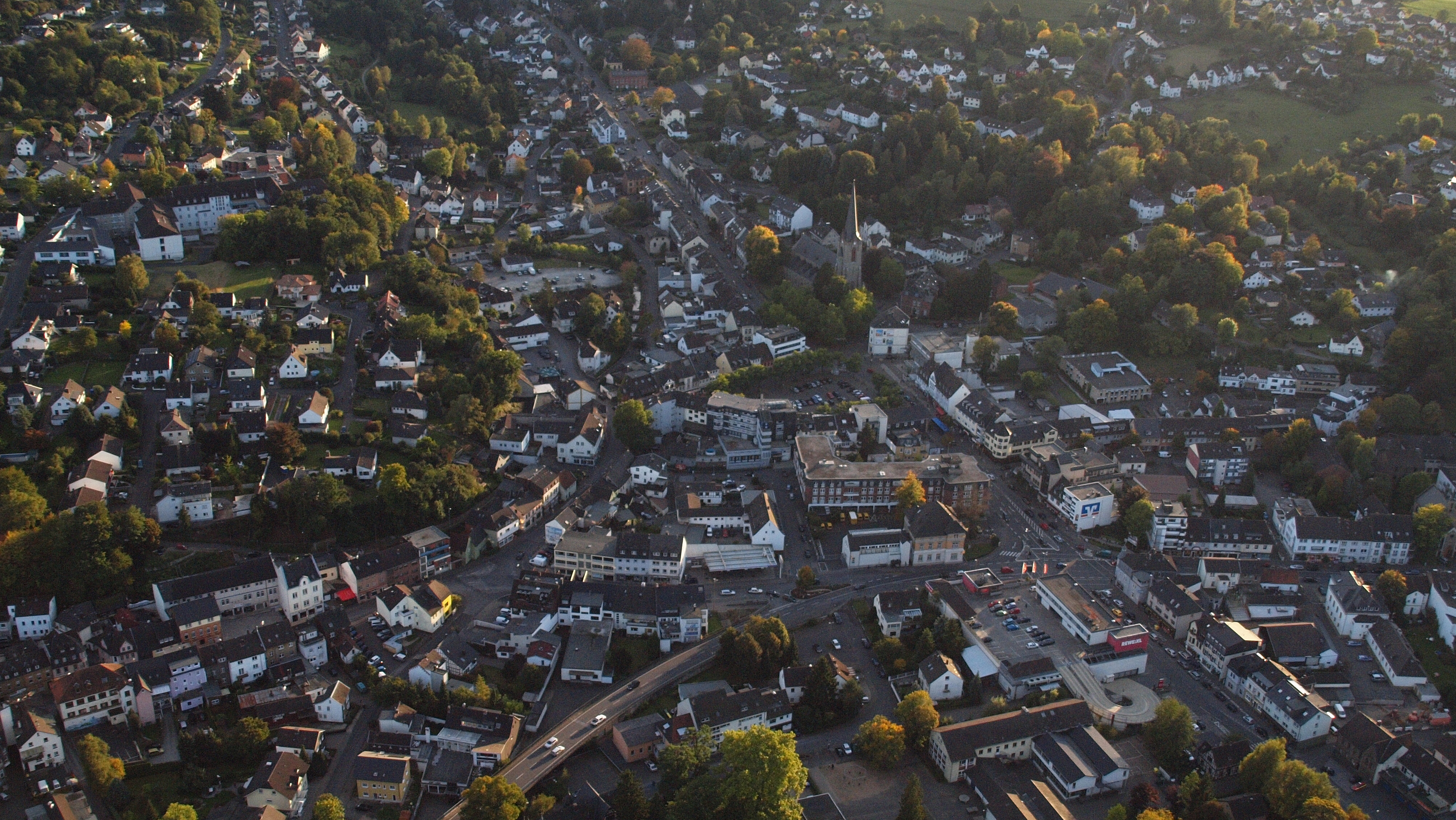
- Aerial view of the town center

- Coat of arms

- Location of Eitorf within Rhein-Sieg-Kreis district
- Interactive map of Eitorf
- Location within Germany Location within North Rhine-Westphalia
- Coordinates: 50°46′11″N 7°27′6″E
- Country: Germany
- State: North Rhine-Westphalia
- Admin. region: Köln
- District: Rhein-Sieg-Kreis
- Subdivisions: 58

Government
  - Mayor (2020–25): Rainer Viehof (Ind.)

Area
  - Total: 69.9 km^{2} (27.0 sq mi)
- Elevation: 95 m (312 ft)

Population (2025-12-31)
  - Total: 19,011
  - Density: 272/km^{2} (704/sq mi)
- Time zone: UTC+01:00 (CET)
  - Summer (DST): UTC+02:00 (CEST)
- Postal codes: 53783
- Dialling codes: 02243
- Vehicle registration: SU
- Website: www.eitorf.de

Eitorf (German pronunciation: [ˈaɪtɔʁf]) is a municipality in the Rhein-Sieg district, in North Rhine-Westphalia, Germany. It is situated on the river Sieg, approx. 25 km east of Bonn city.

== History ==
=== Early history ===
The area encompassing Eitorf was originally inhabited by the Sicambri, who were ultimately almost completely annihilated by the Romans. The area belonged to the unoccupied German settlement region Germania Libera. Afterwards, the Ripuarian Franks emerged from the Tenkterer and other Frankish people in the region and would go on to have a lengthy and complex relationship with the Romans – first as their opponents, then their vassals, and finally their heirs in ruling over all of France and Germany. The names of Frankish settlements from the time frequently have an -ingen ending, of which Köttingen is the only remaining local example. Upon the splitting of the Frankish Kingdom under Charlemagne, the area belonged first to the Kingdom of Louis the German and later to the Duchy of Lorraine. Under the Ottonian Dyanasty, the area belonged to the Duchy of Lower Lorraine in the Holy Roman Empire. Under Emperor Maximilian I, the Rhine-Sieg district belonged to the Lower Rhine District, which spread from the Meuse (German: Maas) to Bremen. The Duchy of Berg later arose in this same area.

=== Middle Ages ===
The first documented mention of Eitorf comes from a document by Holy Roman Emperor Conrad III of Germany in which the Stift of Vilich was confirmed, among other things, to have received the Villa Eidtorph in 978. There were several manor homes that were constructed in the area, including Welterode Fortress, part of which remains to this day.

=== Modern era ===
In the 16th century, Eitorf became the seat of a Landesgericht. Eitorf was affected by several wars including the Thirty Years' War, during which one out of every three inhabitants died in 1631.

== Population ==
Historical population

Year	Pop.	±% p.a.
1965	13,995	—
1970	14,624	+0.88%
1975	14,757	+0.18%
1980	15,224	+0.63%
1985	15,408	+0.24%
1990	16,262	+1.08%
1995	18,031	+2.09%

Year	Pop.	±% p.a.
2000	19,471	+1.55%
2005	19,691	+0.22%
2010	19,386	−0.31%
2015	18,864	−0.54%
2020	18,728	−0.14%
2025	19,011	+0.30%

Source: Landesdatabank Nordrhein-Westfalen

== People ==
- Alexander Neu (born 1969), politician (The Left)
- Phillip P. Peterson (born 1977), author)
