= Hennef (Sieg) station =

Railway station in Hennef (Sieg), Germany

Hennef (Sieg)
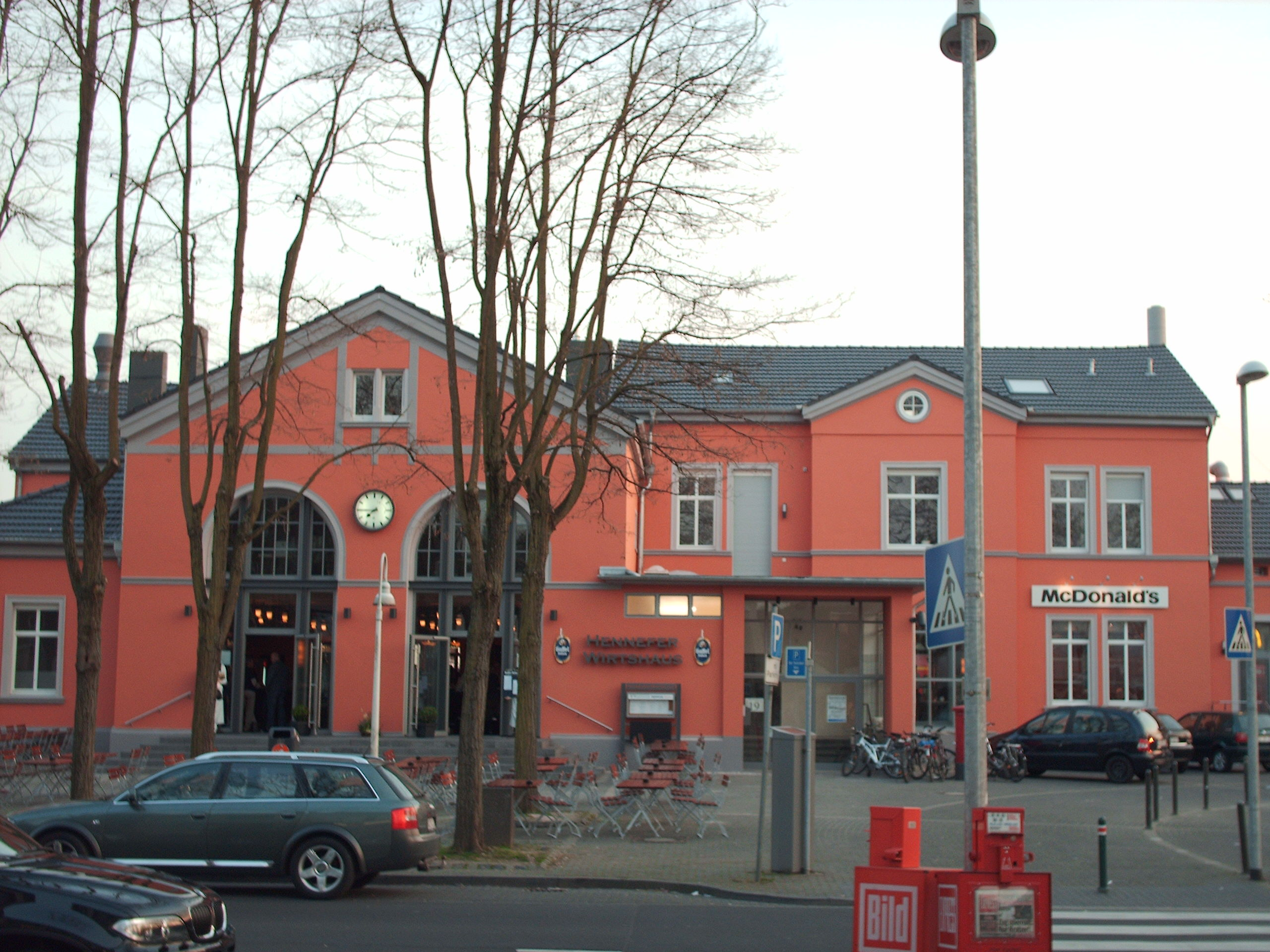
- Station building

General information
- Location: Bahnhofstr. 13, Hennef (Sieg), NRW; Germany
- Coordinates: 50°46′23″N 7°17′3″E
- Line: Cologne–Siegen
- Platforms: 3

Construction
- Accessible: Yes

Other information
- Station code: 2688
- DS100 code: KHEN
- IBNR: 8002753
- Category: 4
- Fare zone: VRS: 2570
- Website: www.bahnhof.de

History
- Opened: 1 January 1859

Services
Preceding station	DB Regio NRW	Following station
Siegburg/Bonn towards Aachen Hbf	RE 9	Eitorf towards Siegen Hbf
Preceding station	Cologne S-Bahn	Following station
Siegburg/Bonn towards Horrem	S12	Hennef im Siegbogen towards Au (Sieg)
Siegburg/Bonn towards Düren	S19	Hennef im Siegbogen towards Au (Sieg)
Location
- Location within North Rhine-Westphalia

Hennef (Sieg) station is located on the Sieg Railway in the town of Hennef (Sieg) in the German state of North Rhine-Westphalia. It was opened in 1859 for passenger and freight traffic by the Cologne-Minden Railway Company along with the Sieg Railway.

== Station building ==
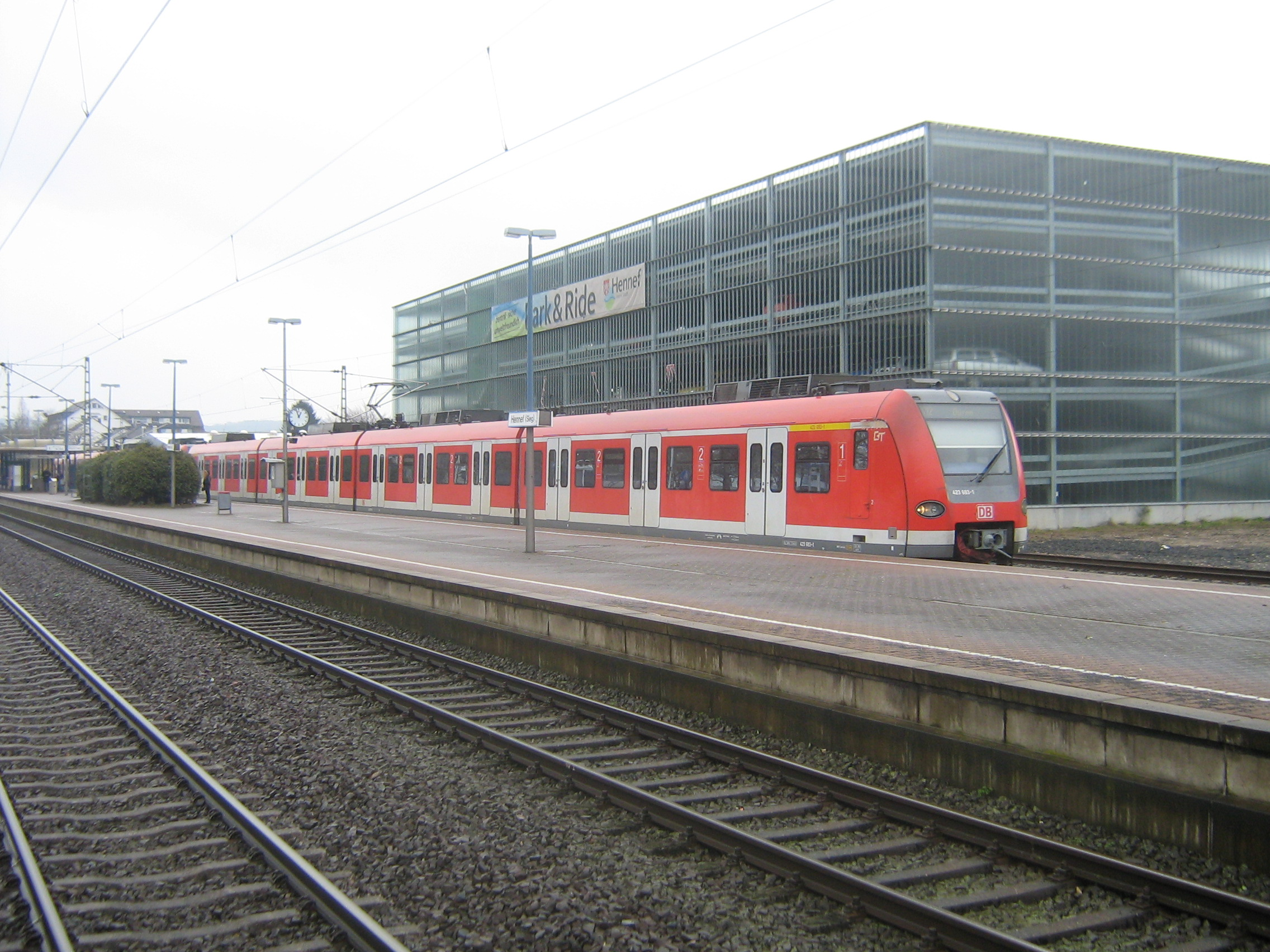
Park&Ride parking station next to the station

The listed building station building was opened in 1859 by the Cologne-Minden Railway Company and has been privately owned since 2004. The station has a Deutsche Bahn ticket counter, a bar and a fast food restaurant. Next to the station there is a parking garage.

== Platforms ==
The station has a side and a central platform serviced by three tracks for passenger trains. They have lifts and are free of barriers for the disabled. The disused track four has no platform.

== Train services ==
The station is served by the Rhein-Sieg-Express (RE 9) every hour. It is also served by Cologne S-Bahn lines S12 between Düren or Köln-Ehrenfeld and Hennef (Sieg) every 20 minutes and S19 between Düren and Hennef (Sieg), Blankenberg (Sieg), Herchen or Au (Sieg) every 20 minutes, Monday to Saturday. One S12 service an hour continues to/from Au (Sieg) Monday–Saturday. On Sundays and public holidays, the S12 operates every 30 minutes between Horrem and Au (Sieg). Together these provide services every 10 minutes through Cologne Monday–Saturday and four services an hour on Sunday. Freight trains rarely operate through the station. All passenger trains running through the station are operated by DB Regio NRW. The station is classified by Deutsche Bahn since January 2011 as a category 4 station.
