= Dattenfeld station =

Railway station in Germany

Dattenfeld (Sieg)
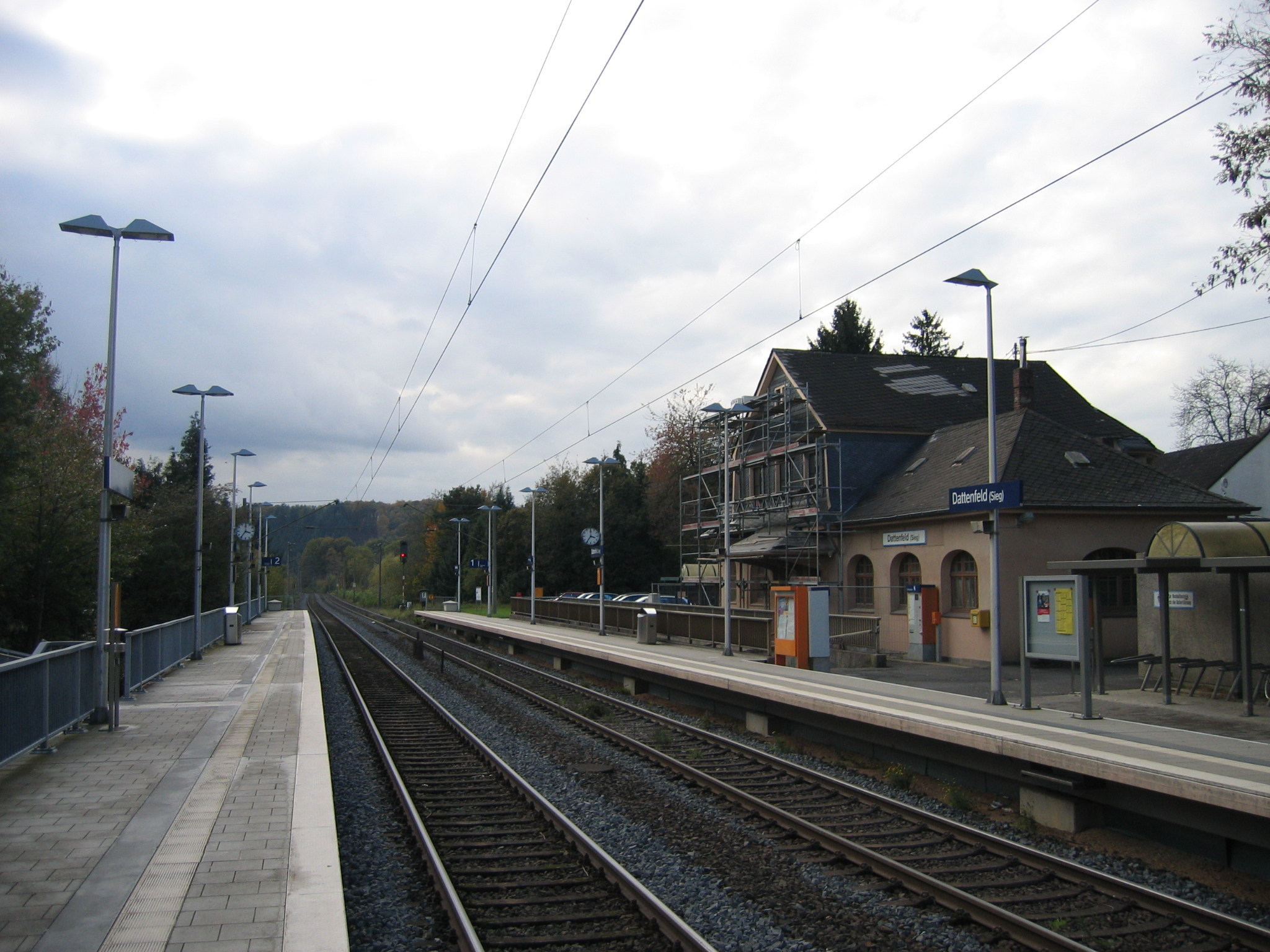

General information
- Location: Engbachweg 28, Dattenfeld (Sieg), Windeck, NRW; Germany
- Coordinates: 50°48′33″N 7°32′46″E
- Lines: Cologne–Siegen (KBS 450.12)
- Platforms: 2

Construction
- Accessible: Platform 1 only

Other information
- Station code: 1135
- DS100 code: KDAT
- IBNR: 8001384
- Category: 6
- Fare zone: VRS: 2597
- Website: www.bahnhof.de

History
- Opened: 1880/97

Services
Preceding station	Cologne S-Bahn	Following station
Herchen towards Horrem	S12	Schladern (Sieg) towards Au (Sieg)
Herchen towards Düren	S19	Schladern (Sieg) towards Au (Sieg)
Location

Dattenfeld (Sieg) station is a through station in the town of Windeck in the German state of North Rhine-Westphalia. The station was opened between 1880 and 1897 on a section of the Sieg Railway, opened by the Cologne-Minden Railway Company (German: Cöln-Mindener Eisenbahn-Gesellschaft, CME) between Eitorf and Wissen on 1 August 1861. It has two platform tracks and is classified by Deutsche Bahn as a category 6 station.

The station is served by S-Bahn S 12 services between Köln-Ehrenfeld and Au (Sieg) and from Monday to Saturday until early evening by S19 services between Düren and Au (Sieg). Both services operate hourly.
