= Schladern (Sieg) station =

Railway station in Windeck, Germany

Schladern (Sieg)
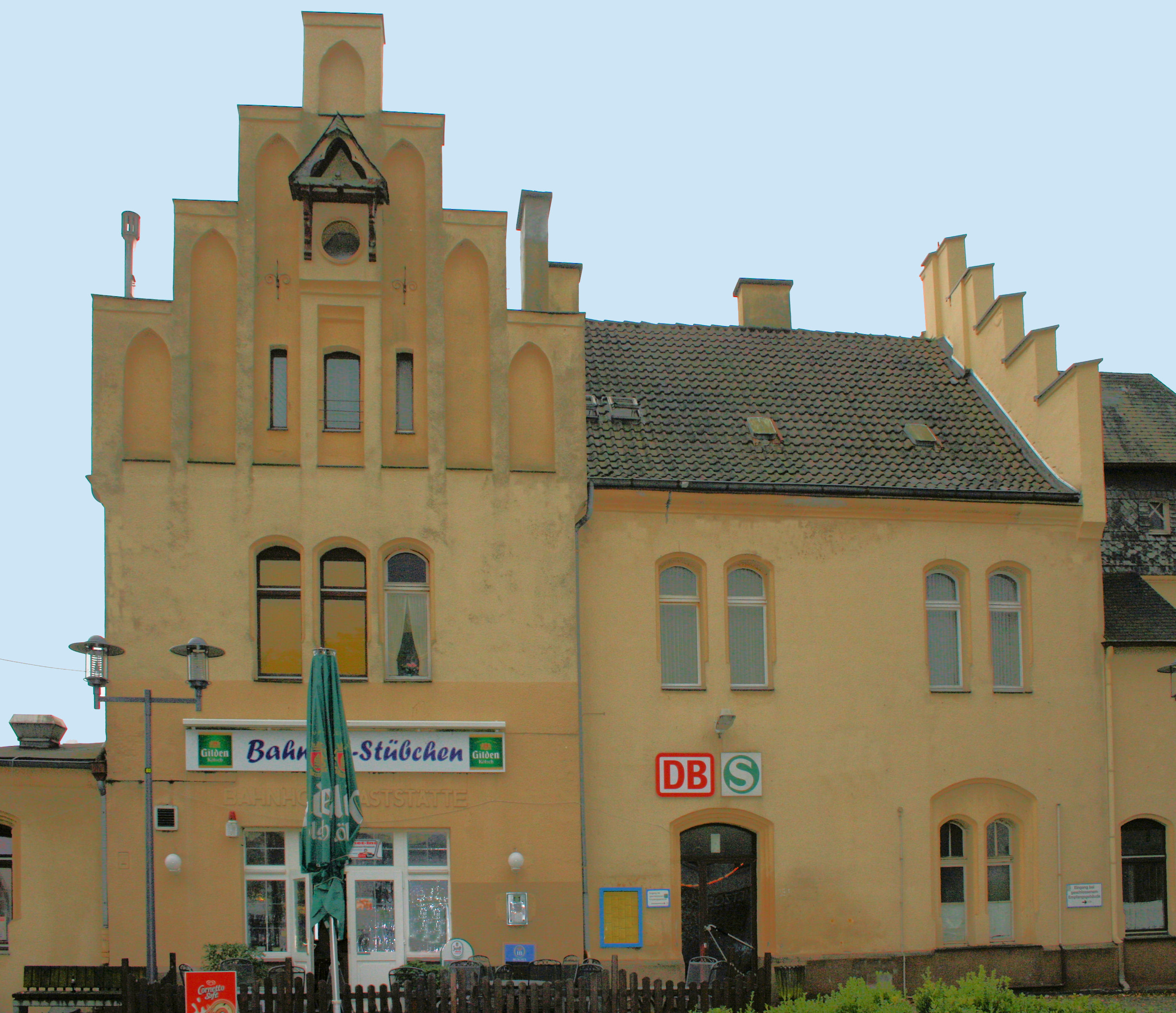
- Entrance building

General information
- Location: Waldbröler Str. 3, Schladern (Sieg), Windeck, NRW; Germany
- Coordinates: 50°48′26″N 7°35′33″E
- Lines: Cologne–Siegen (KBS 460, KBS 450.12)
- Platforms: 2

Construction
- Accessible: Yes

Other information
- Station code: 5580
- DS100 code: KSLA
- IBNR: 8005356
- Category: 5
- Fare zone: VRS: 2597
- Website: www.bahnhof.de

History
- Opened: 1859

Services
Preceding station	DB Regio NRW	Following station
Herchen towards Aachen Hbf	RE 9	Au (Sieg) towards Siegen Hbf
Preceding station	Cologne S-Bahn	Following station
Dattenfeld (Sieg) towards Horrem	S12	Rosbach (Sieg) towards Au (Sieg)
Dattenfeld (Sieg) towards Düren	S19	Rosbach (Sieg) towards Au (Sieg)
Location
- Location within North Rhine-Westphalia

Schladern (Sieg) is a station on the Sieg Railway in Windeck-Schladern in the German state of North Rhine-Westphalia. The station building was built in 1859 and has monument protection. It was built on a section of the Sieg Railway that was opened by the Cologne-Minden Railway Company (German: Cöln-Mindener Eisenbahn-Gesellschaft, CME) between Eitorf and Wissen on 1 August 1861. It has two platform tracks and is classified by Deutsche Bahn as a category 5 station.

== Use ==
The station building, which was no longer occupied by the railway, was purchased in 2002 by the Wirtschaftsförderungs- und Entwicklungsgesellschaft Windeck (Windeck business development and development company), resold and rented out after renovation. In addition to offices, it currently houses a café and a municipal tourist office. There is also a pedelec charging station and an ATM at the station. The stop is used by 15,000 passengers annually.

== Services ==
The station is served by S-Bahn S 12 services between Köln-Ehrenfeld and Au (Sieg) and from Monday to Saturday until early evening by S19 services from Düren and Au (Sieg). Both services operate hourly.

== Heritage-listing ==
The brick building built in the Wilhelmine style and is listed as item A 169 in the list of monuments in Windeck.

== Others ==
The station was designated in 2014 as a Wanderbahnhof NRW ("hiking station" of NRW). Nearby are the Sieg fall, Mauel Castle and Windeck Castle.
