= Rosbach (Sieg) station =

Railway station in Germany

Rosbach (Sieg)
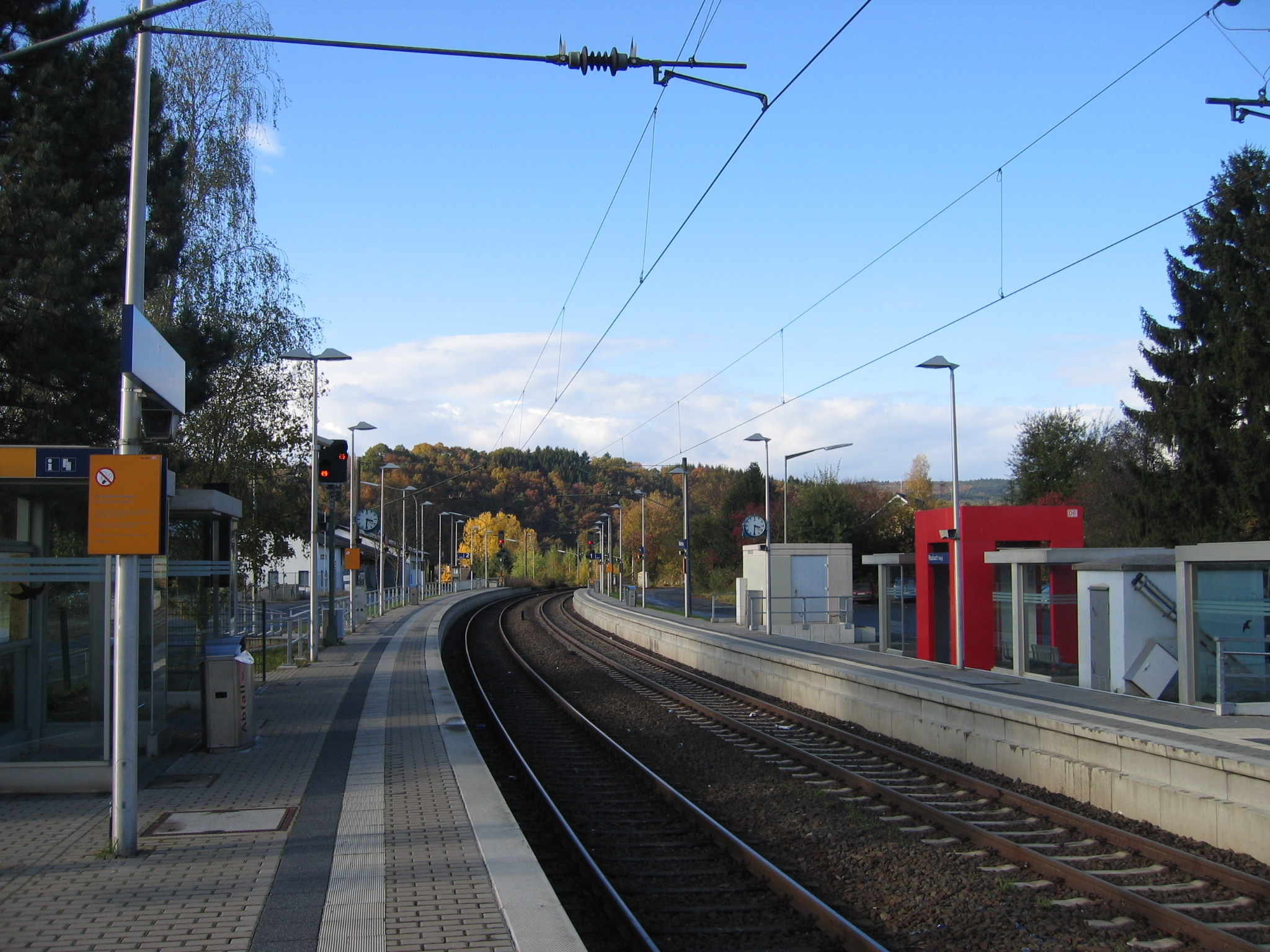
- Rosbach station in 2007

General information
- Location: Marktstr., Rosbach (Sieg), Windeck, NRW; Germany
- Coordinates: 50°47′49″N 7°36′29″E
- Lines: Sieg Railway (KBS 450.12)
- Platforms: 2

Construction
- Accessible: Yes

Other information
- Station code: 5341
- DS100 code: KROS
- IBNR: 8005164
- Category: 6
- Fare zone: VRS: 2597
- Website: www.bahnhof.de

History
- Opened: 1880/97

Services
Preceding station	Cologne S-Bahn	Following station
Schladern (Sieg) towards Horrem	S12	Au (Sieg) Terminus
Schladern (Sieg) towards Düren	S19	Au (Sieg) Terminus
Location
- Location within North Rhine-Westphalia

Rosbach (Sieg) is a railway station on the Sieg Railway, situated at Windeck, Rhein-Sieg-Kreis in western Germany. The station building was built between 1880 and 1897 on a section of the Sieg Railway that was opened by the Cologne-Minden Railway Company (German: Cöln-Mindener Eisenbahn-Gesellschaft, CME) between Eitorf and Wissen on 1 August 1861. It has two platform tracks and is classified by Deutsche Bahn as a category 6 station.

It is served by S-Bahn S 12 services between Köln-Ehrenfeld and Au (Sieg) and from Monday to Saturday until early evening by S19 services from Düren and Au (Sieg). Both services operate hourly.
