= Siegburg/Bonn station =

Railway station in Germany

Siegburg/Bonn
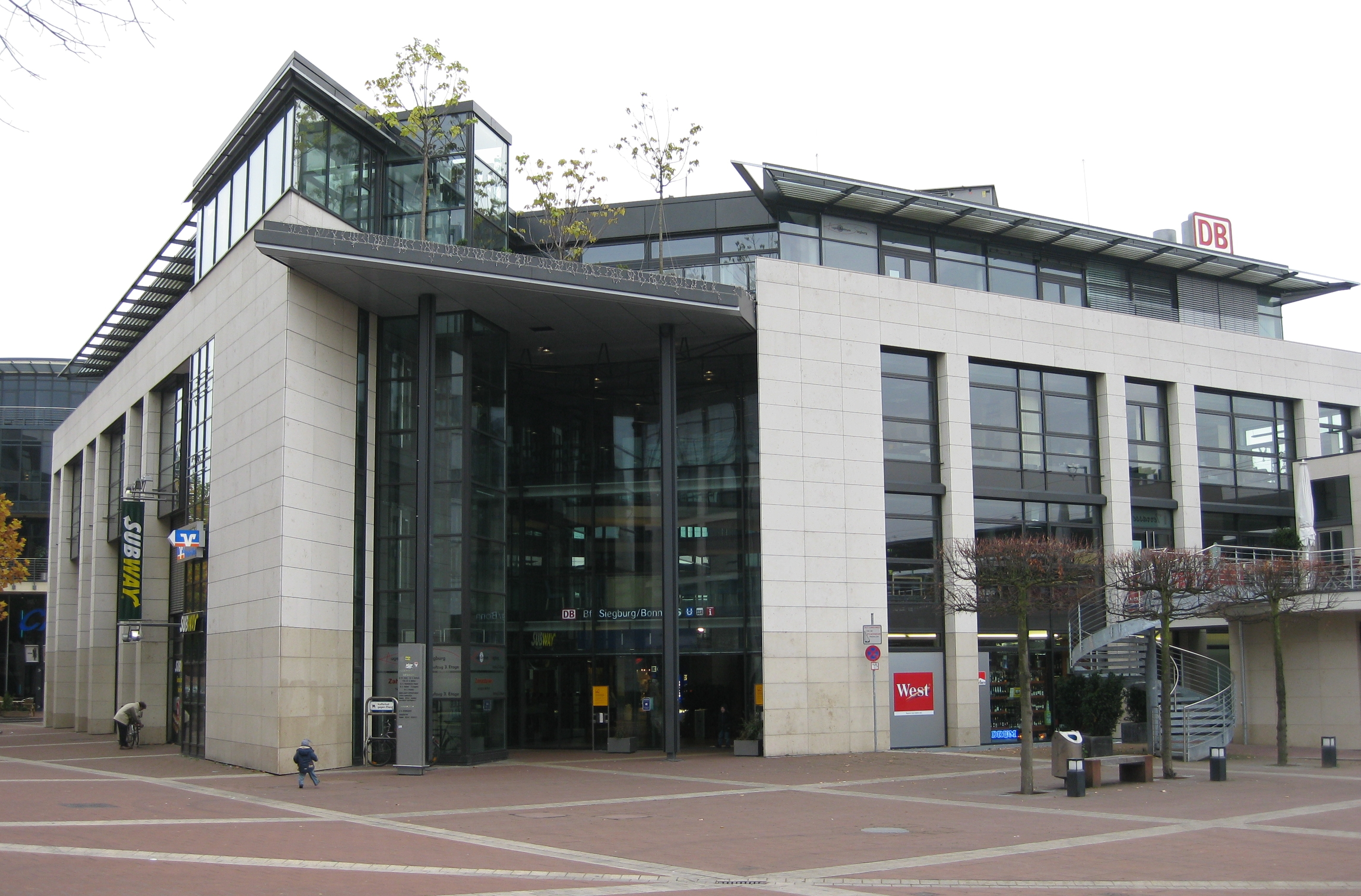

General information
- Location: Wilhelmstr. 45, Siegburg, NRW; Germany
- Coordinates: 50°47′37″N 7°12′10″E
- Owner: Deutsche Bahn
- Operator: DB Netz; DB Station&Service
- Lines: Cologne–Frankfurt high-speed rail line (110.5 km) (KBS 472)
- Platforms: 4

Construction
- Accessible: Yes

Other information
- Station code: 5840
- DS100 code: KSIB
- IBNR: 8005556
- Category: 3
- Fare zone: VRS: 2551
- Website: www.bahnhof.de

History
- Opened: 1859

Passengers
- 20,000 per day

Services
Preceding station	DB Fernverkehr	Following station
Köln Hbf towards Münster Hbf or Dortmund Hbf	ICE 42	Frankfurt Airport towards München Hbf
Köln/Bonn Flughafen towards Köln Hbf	ICE 45	Montabaur towards Stuttgart Hbf or Frankfurt (Main) Hbf
Köln Hbf Terminus	ICE 49	Montabaur towards Frankfurt (Main) Hbf
Köln Hbf towards Amsterdam Centraal	ICE 78	Frankfurt Airport towards Frankfurt (Main) Hbf
Köln Messe/Deutz towards Amsterdam Centraal	ICE 78	Frankfurt Airport towards München Hbf
Köln Hbf towards Brussels-South	ICE 79	Montabaur towards Frankfurt (Main) Hbf
Preceding station	DB Regio NRW	Following station
Troisdorf towards Aachen Hbf	RE 9	Hennef (Sieg) towards Siegen Hbf
Preceding station	Cologne S-Bahn	Following station
Troisdorf towards Horrem	S12	Hennef (Sieg) towards Hennef (Sieg) or Au (Sieg)
Troisdorf towards Düren	S19	Hennef (Sieg) towards Blankenberg (Sieg), Herchen or Au (Sieg)

Other services
Preceding station	Bonn Stadtbahn	Following station
Terminus	Line 66	Sankt Augustin Mülldorf towards Bad Honnef
Terminus	Line 67	Sankt Augustin Mülldorf towards Bad Godesberg Stadthalle
Location

Siegburg/Bonn station, in the town of Siegburg, North Rhine-Westphalia, Germany, is on the Cologne–Frankfurt high-speed rail line and the Sieg Railway. It was rebuilt for the high-speed line and is connected to Bonn by the Siegburg line of the Bonn Stadtbahn. It is in the network area of the Verkehrsverbund Rhein-Sieg (Rhine-Sieg Transport Association).

== History ==
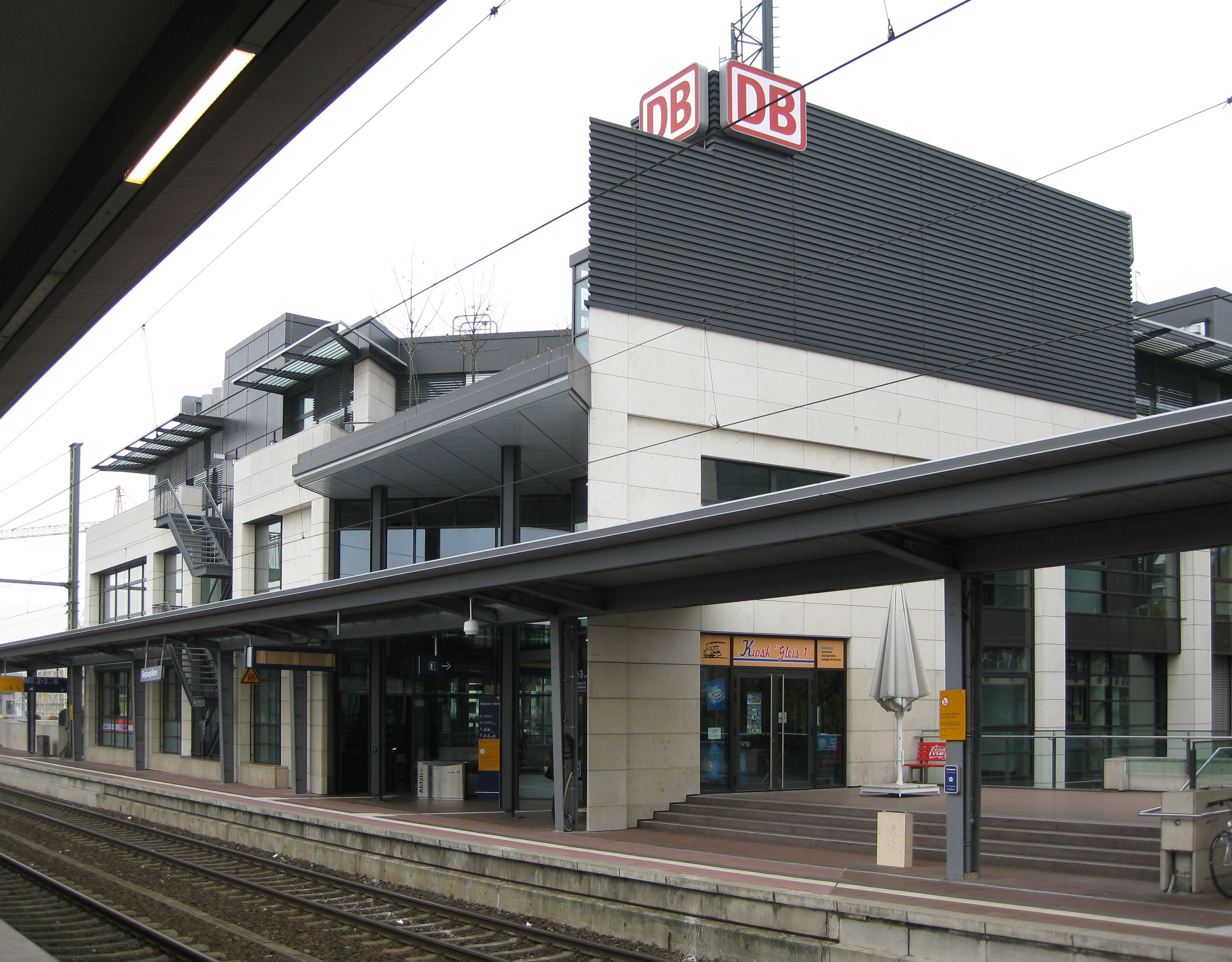
Station building (track side)

The original Siegburg station opened in 1859 on the Sieg Railway (German: Siegstrecke). In 1870, Siegburg became the northern end of the East Rhine Railway (Rechte Rheinstrecke), with the intention that it would be later extended through the Agger valley through the Ruhr to Bochum or Essen, so that Siegburg would become a significant railway junction. Influential people in Cologne finally prevailed, so instead the East Rhine Railway was extended from Friedrich-Wilhelms-Hütte to Troisdorf in order to connect to Cologne, resulting in the line to Siegburg becoming only a branch line parallel with the Sieg Railway. This line was opened in 1872 and closed in 1884. The terminus of this line, the Rheinische Bahnhof (Rhenish station), named after its operator, the Rhenish Railway Company (Rheinische Eisenbahn-Gesellschaft), was next to the station of the Sieg Railway of the Cologne-Minden Railway Company (Cöln-Mindener Eisenbahn-Gesellschaft) on a site later used as a freight depot. In the same year, the Siegburg–Olpe railway (or Agger Valley Railway) via Overath and Dieringhausen to Olpe was opened. With the opening of the direct Köln-Kalk–Overath railway in 1910, the Siegburg–Olpe line lost its importance and it has no longer been used for passenger services since 1954. In 1897, a narrow gauge line was built by the Brölthaler Eisenbahn-Actien-Gesellschaft (Bröl Valley Railway Company) to its own station south of Siegburg station; this was closed in 1955. In 1911, the Siegburg Railway (Siegburger Bahn) was opened, which is now operated as part of the Bonn Stadtbahn. In 1914, the Siegburg–Zündorf Light Railway (Kleinbahn Siegburg–Zündorf) was opened, but the Siegburg–Troisdorf section of it was closed in 1963.

In 1989, the federal government decided that the new Cologne-Frankfurt high-speed line would run on the eastern side of the Rhine. Intermediate stations would be provided in—along with Cologne/Bonn Airport, the Limburg area, Mainz, Wiesbaden and Frankfurt Airport—Bonn-Vilich or Siegburg.

On 13 May 1997, the ceremonial beginning of the construction of the Cologne-Frankfurt high-speed line in North Rhine-Westphalia was celebrated in Siegburg: the North Rhine-Westphalian Economics Minister, Wolfgang Clement, Federal Minister of Transport, Matthias Wissmann, and Deutsche Bahn chairman, Heinz Dürr, operated a device symbolising three levers of a lever frame of a mechanical interlocking. As part of the ceremony, an Intercity-Express (ICE) ran from Siegburg for the first time, carrying honoured guests and 500 other specially-chosen travellers, via Cologne and Düsseldorf to Oberhausen and back.

=== Reconstruction as an ICE station ===
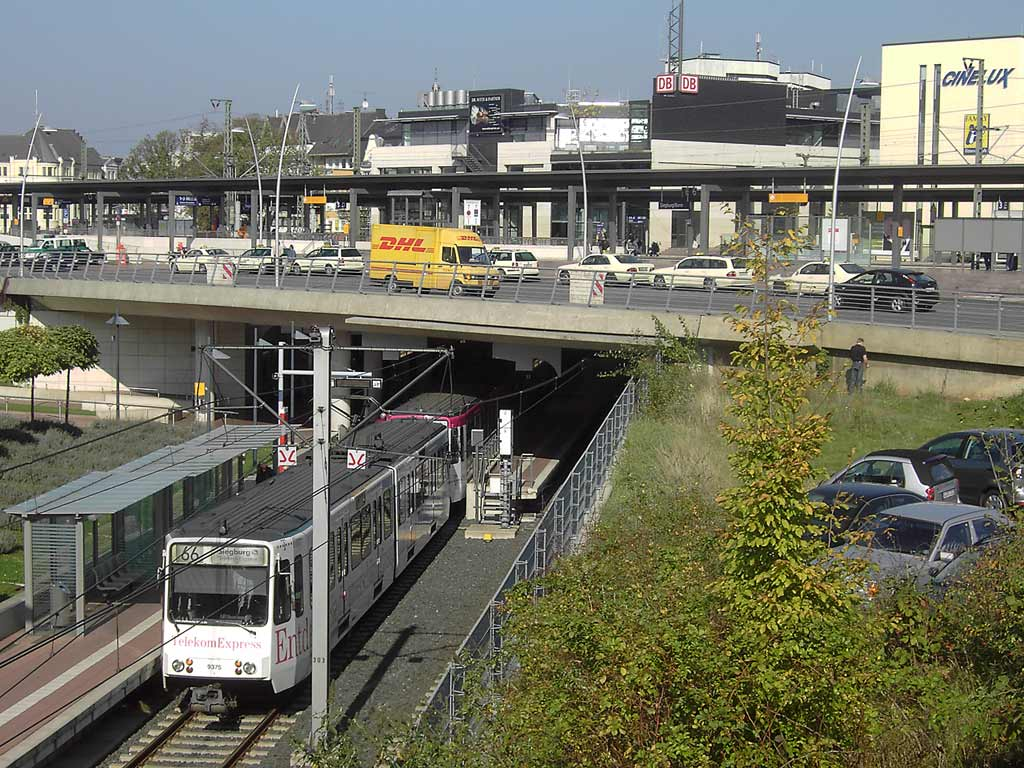
The Stadtbahn stop in the basement

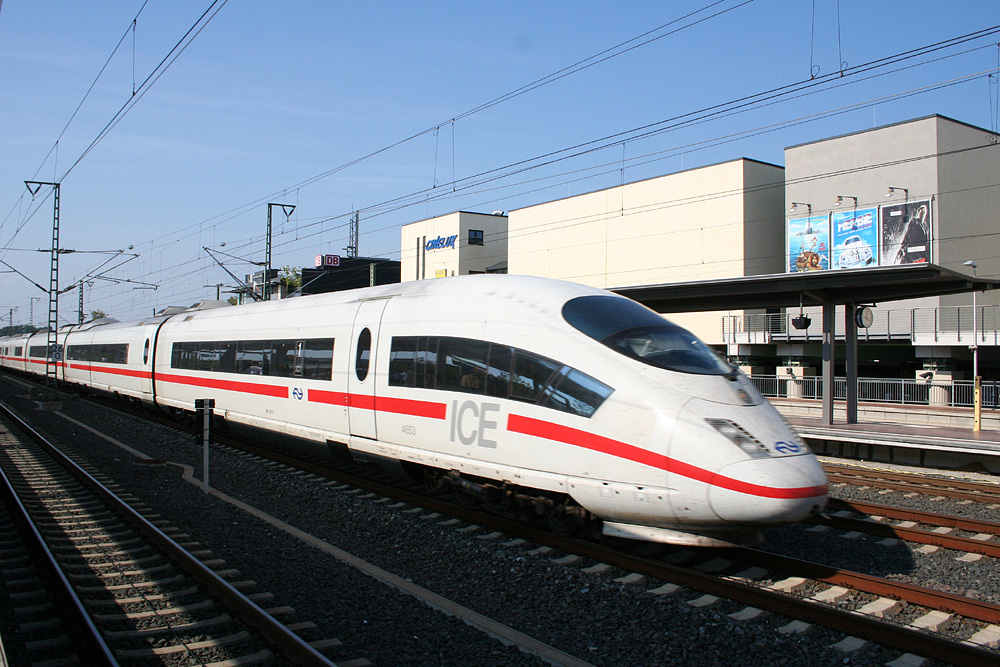
An ICE 3 train passing through the station without stopping

At the turn of 1996/1997, a contract was awarded for section 23 of the new line, which covered a 3.3 km (2.1 mi)-long section, which was mainly located in the area of the town of Siegburg. At a cost of about Deutsche Mark (DM) 40 million, two through high-speed tracks would be built, platforms would be built or modified and bridges would be built or rebuilt.

As part of the construction of the Cologne-Frankfurt high-speed line, the old station was demolished in 2000 and replaced by a new building, which was opened in late September 2004. There was also urban redevelopment around the station. In particular, the old station building had to be demolished for the new line. Deutsche Bahn and the town of Siegburg advertised a design competition for the new building.

On 25 June 2001, representatives of Deutsche Bahn and the town of Siegburg signed a framework agreement for the renovation of the station. Four days later, the construction contract was awarded. The opening was planned for the third quarter of 2002. From 1,200 to 3,000 square metres of floor area was provided for trading and other services. In addition, two new tracks were laid so that ICE services could stop or run through non-stop. The through tracks can be run at 200 km/h and the entry and exit tracks to the two ICE platform tracks can be run at 100 km/h.

On 26 July 2002, a day after the opening run, Siegburg was a stopover of an ICE 3 service from Frankfurt via Siegburg to Montabaur. About 500 people who had participated in the project joined at Siegburg.

With the full opening of the new line on 15 December 2002, the station was renamed as "Siegburg/Bonn". The new name is intended to indicate that this station serves as the high-speed line connection for Bonn, as the majority of long-distance trains between the Rhine/Main region and Cologne no longer run through Bonn Central Station.

The Siegburg line of the Stadtbahn that previously ended in the station forecourt was rebuilt on a ramp that runs directly into the basement of the new station. The underground station has two high-level platforms. From there, the platforms used by long-distance and regional services can be reached via stairs and lifts. The departure times of the Stadtbahn services are displayed on the notice boards at the entrance of the station.

The station now has six tracks: two through tracks on the high-speed line and four platform edges (an island platform and two outer platforms). The 400-metre (1,312 ft)-long ICE platforms are covered for 300 m (984 ft) of their length. The island platform is served by both ICE trains to Cologne and regional and S-Bahn trains towards Hennef (Sieg). The platform served by regional and S-Bahn services from Cologne is 210 m (689 ft) long.

Two class 226 locomotives were stationed at Siegburg/Bonn from 2003 station for towing broken down trains on the high-speed line. These locomotives were later withdrawn.

Before the opening of the rebuilt station, 100 parking spaces were needed. At the opening of the station there were about 500 parking spaces. The number of parking spaces at the station was recently increased from around 1,000 to around 1,500 by the construction of a parking garage.

== Rail services ==
=== Long-distance services ===
The following ICE services stop at Siegburg/Bonn:

Line	Route	Frequency
ICE 42	(Münster –) Dortmund – Düsseldorf – Siegburg/Bonn – Frankfurt Airport – Mannheim – Stuttgart – Munich	Every 2 hours
ICE 43	(Hannover –) Dortmund – Wuppertal – Siegburg/Bonn – Frankfurt Airport – Mannheim – Karlsruhe – Basel SBB	Every 2 hours
ICE 45	Köln – Cologne/Bonn Airport – Siegburg/Bonn – Montabaur – Limburg Süd – Wiesbaden – Mainz – Mannheim – Heidelberg – Vaihingen – Stuttgart	Individual services
ICE 49	Cologne Hbf (– Cologne/Bonn Airport) – Siegburg/Bonn – Montabaur – Limburg Süd – Frankfurt Airport – Frankfurt (M) Hbf	Individual services
ICE 79	Brussels-South – Brussels-North – Liège-Guillemins – Aachen – Cologne Hbf – (Cologne/Bonn Airport) – Siegburg/Bonn – (Limburg Süd) – (Montabaur) – Frankfurt Airport – Frankfurt (M) Hbf	Individual services

=== Regional services ===
It is served by the following regional services:

Line	Line name	Route
RE 9	Rhein-Sieg-Express	Aachen – Düren – Cologne Hbf – Siegburg/Bonn – Siegen
S12	Cologne S-Bahn	Horrem – Cologne Hbf – Porz (Rhein) – Siegburg/Bonn – Au (Sieg)
S19	Cologne S-Bahn	Düren – Cologne Hbf – Cologne/Bonn Airport – Siegburg/Bonn – Au (Sieg)

=== Stadtbahn ===
It is served by the following Stadtbahn services:

Line	Operator	Route
	Bonn Stadtbahn	Siegburg – Sankt Augustin – Bonn Hbf – trunk line – Oberkassel – Bad Honnef
	Bonn Stadtbahn	Siegburg – Sankt Augustin – Bonn Hbf – trunk line – Bad Godesberg (two services in the mornings only on schooldays)

== AIRail ==
Since 5 November 2007, the station has been integrated as part of the AIRail Service. In the station’s travel centre there were two Lufthansa check-in machines, which allowed passengers to check their luggage on Lufthansa flights. These have since been replaced by other check-in arrangements. Passengers travel by ICE to Frankfurt Airport long-distance station and then proceed to their aircraft. The baggage is carried to Frankfurt airport and taken to the aircraft.

The station has the IATA code of ZPY.

== Importance for the Bonn region ==
According to traffic counts, about 20,000 passengers use the station every day (February 2011).

As part of the initial operations on the new Cologne-Frankfurt high-speed line Siegburg/Bonn was served from 1 August 2002 by every third ICE train and the remaining two passed through without stopping. In the first year an ICE served the station approximately every two hours both ways. A few hundred ICE passengers were counted each day.

Up to 2004, passenger numbers grew by 70 percent per year. 14,000 ICE passengers were counted each week in 2004 and there were around 20,000 in 2005. In 2005 just under 2,500 ICE passengers were counted each day and there were around 4,000 in 2012. In mid-2012, DB stated that about 8,000 ICE passengers embarked at the three stations of Siegburg/Bonn, South Limburg and Montabaur.

In the 2010 timetable about 56 ICE trains stopped each weekday in Siegburg/Bonn. In the 2007 timetable 61 ICE trains stopped each weekday, as opposed to 51 in 2005 and 38 in 2003. The number of direct services to and from Frankfurt Central Station has increased to 29. In the 2012 timetable, the station is served by 57 ICE services each day.
