= Köln Airport-Businesspark station =

Railway station in Germany

Köln Airport-Businesspark
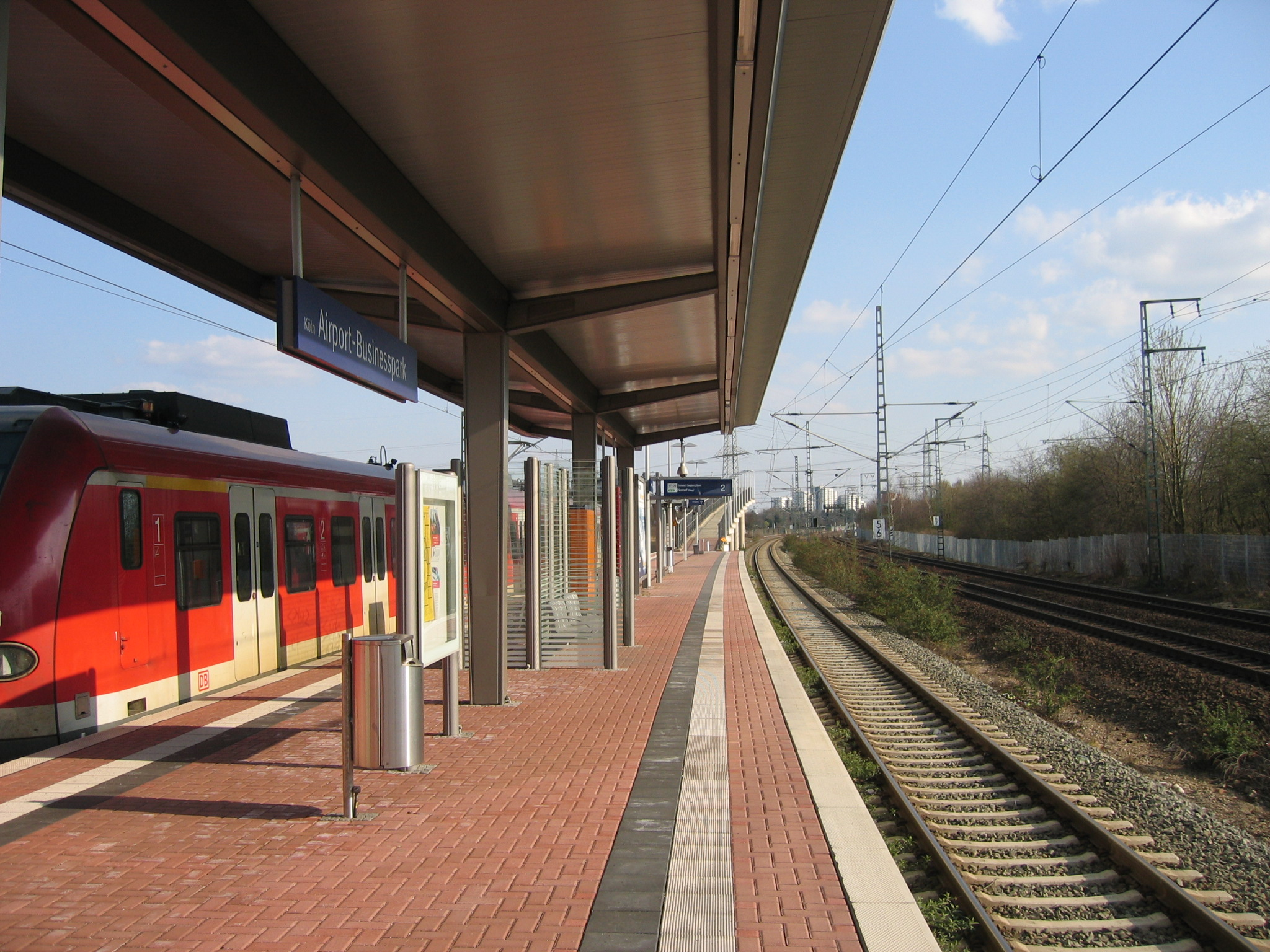

General information
- Location: Cologne, NRW; Germany
- Coordinates: 50°54′37″N 7°02′41″E
- Lines: Sieg Railway; East Rhine Railway
- Platforms: 2

Construction
- Accessible: Yes

Other information
- Station code: 2070
- DS100 code: KBP
- Category: 6
- Fare zone: VRS: 2100
- Website: www.bahnhof.de

History
- Opened: 13 June 2004

Services
| Preceding station | Cologne S-Bahn | Following station |
|---|---|---|
| Köln-Trimbornstraße towards Horrem | S12 | Köln-Steinstraße towards Au (Sieg) |
Location
- Location within North Rhine-Westphalia Location within Germany Location within Europe

Köln Airport-Businesspark is a railway station in Gremberghoven, Cologne in western Germany. It is served by Cologne S-Bahn line S12 between Horrem or Köln-Ehrenfeld and Troisdorf every 20 minutes Monday–Saturday and every 30 minutes on Sunday.
