= Herchen station =

Railway station in Windeck, Germany

Herchen
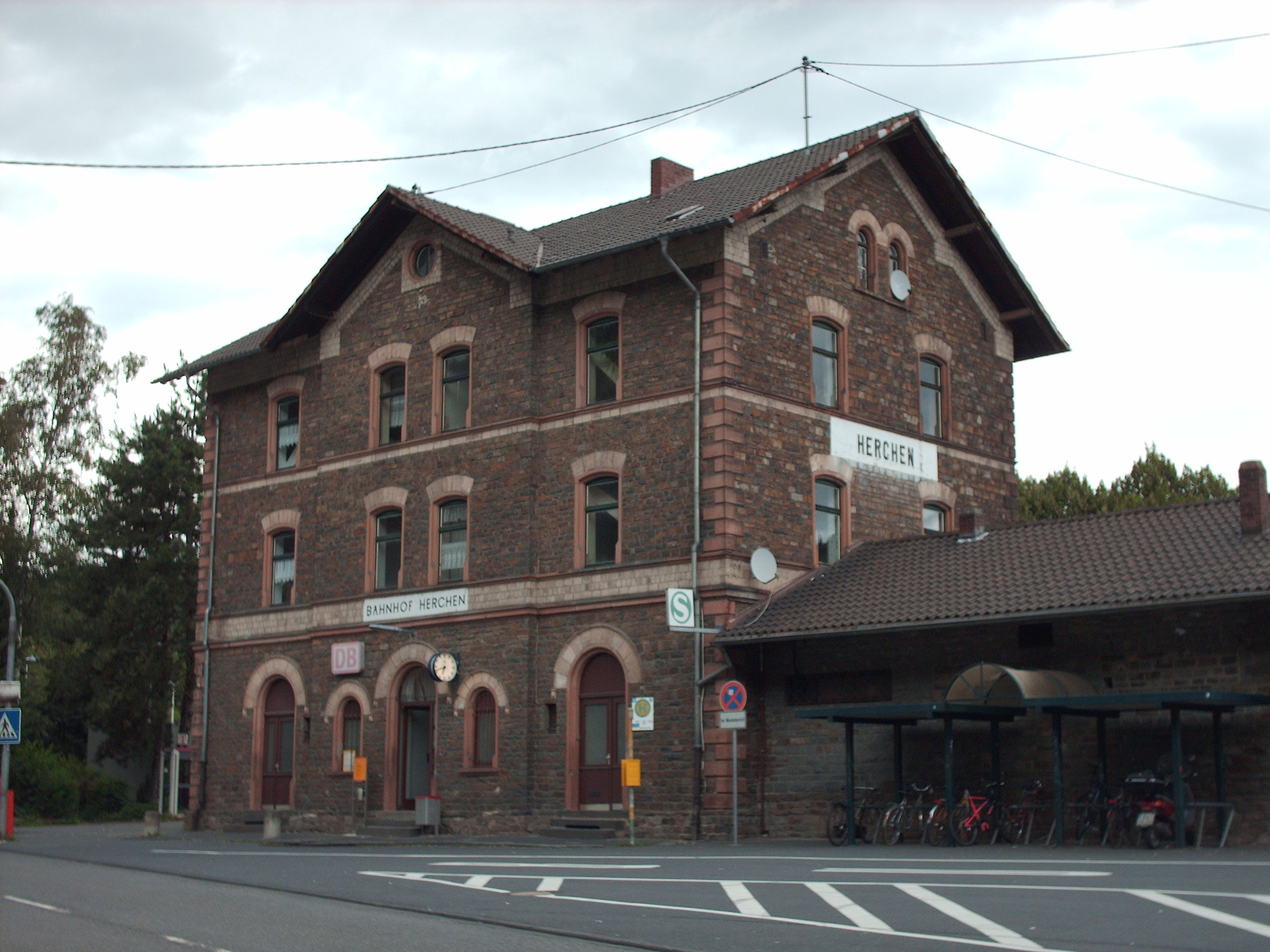

General information
- Location: Stromberger Str. 1, Herchen, Windeck, NRW
- Coordinates: 50°46′16″N 7°31′19″E
- Lines: Cologne–Siegen (KBS 460, KBS 450.12)
- Platforms: 2

Construction
- Accessible: Yes

Other information
- Station code: 2705
- DS100 code: KHEC
- IBNR: 8002768
- Category: 5
- Fare zone: VRS: 2597
- Website: www.bahnhof.de

History
- Opened: 1860

Services
Preceding station	DB Regio NRW	Following station
Eitorf towards Aachen Hbf	RE 9	Schladern (Sieg) towards Siegen Hbf
Preceding station	Cologne S-Bahn	Following station
Eitorf towards Horrem	S12	Dattenfeld (Sieg) towards Au (Sieg)
Eitorf towards Düren	S19	Dattenfeld (Sieg) towards Au (Sieg)
Location
- Location within North Rhine-Westphalia

Herchen station is a through station in the town of Windeck in the German state of North Rhine-Westphalia. The station was opened in 1860 on a section of the Sieg Railway, opened by the Cologne-Minden Railway Company (German: Cöln-Mindener Eisenbahn-Gesellschaft, CME) between Eitorf and Wissen on 1 August 1861. It has two platform tracks and is classified by Deutsche Bahn as a category 5 station.

The station is served by S-Bahn S 12 services between Köln-Ehrenfeld and Au (Sieg) and from Monday to Saturday until early evening by S19 services between Düren and Au (Sieg). Both services operate hourly.
