= Opperzau =

Coordinates: 50.784025°N 7.676218°E

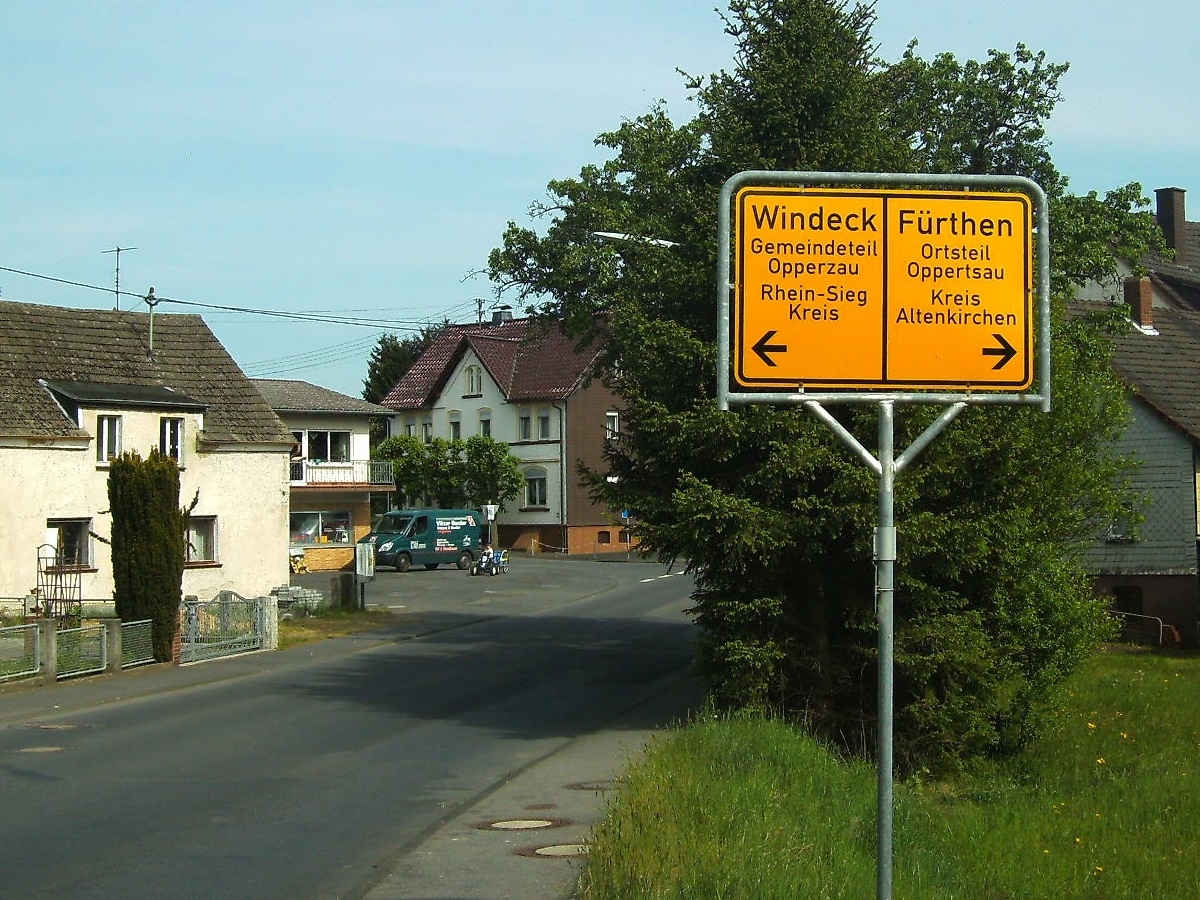
Split city limit sign on the Oppertsau side

Opperzau is a community of the German municipality Windeck, in the Rhein-Sieg district, in the south-eastern part of North Rhine-Westphalia. The southern part of Opperzau is named Oppertsau, which belongs to the municipality Fürthen and belongs to Rhineland-Palatinate. It is located at the middle course of the river Sieg.

== History ==
In 1604, the settlement of Siegburg (Siegburger Vergleich) clarified the limit of the current federal states North Rhine-Westphalia and Rhineland-Palatinate which leads through the village and parted them into Opperzau (northern part) and Oppertsau (southern part). The reason for this was a dispute of a territorial sovereignty that started in 1294, when the County of Sayn-Wittgenstein and other small counties claimed possession over parts of Berg and the Sieg districts. Today, 200 meters of a road within the village mark the boundary between both federal counties, and have two different street names: Fürthener Straße for the Opperzau side and Siegstraße for the Oppertsau side.

== Traffic ==
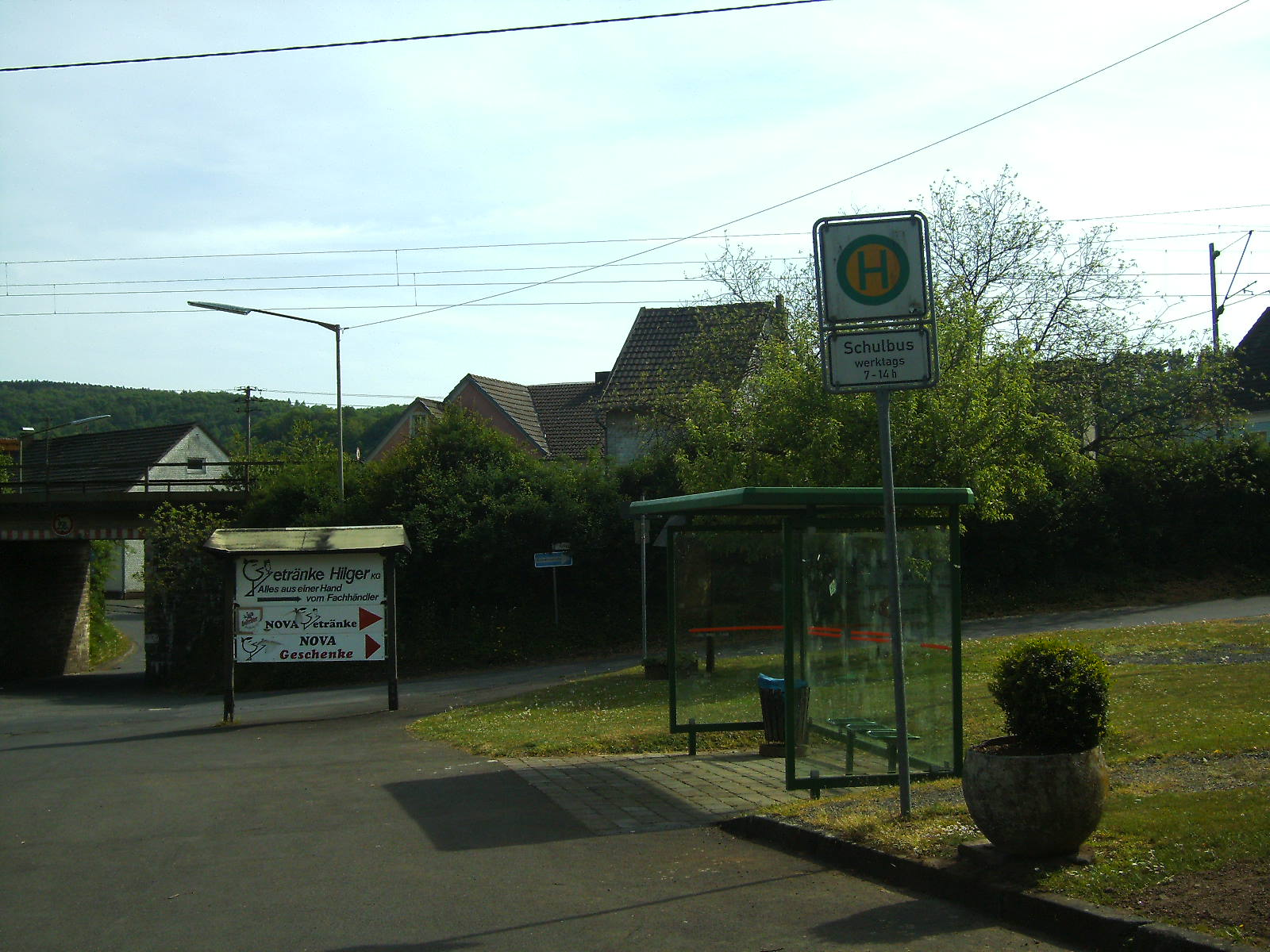
Bus stop Opperzau

Until 1993, Opperzau had a train stop at the Sieg railway, which is no longer used, due to a lack of passengers, nearest train stops are Etzbach and Au (Sieg).

Operzau is served by the local bus lines 260, 261, 284 and 288.

The roads 112 and 267 extend along Opperzau to other parts of the Altenkirchen district and to districts of Windeck.
