= Windeck =

- Municipality
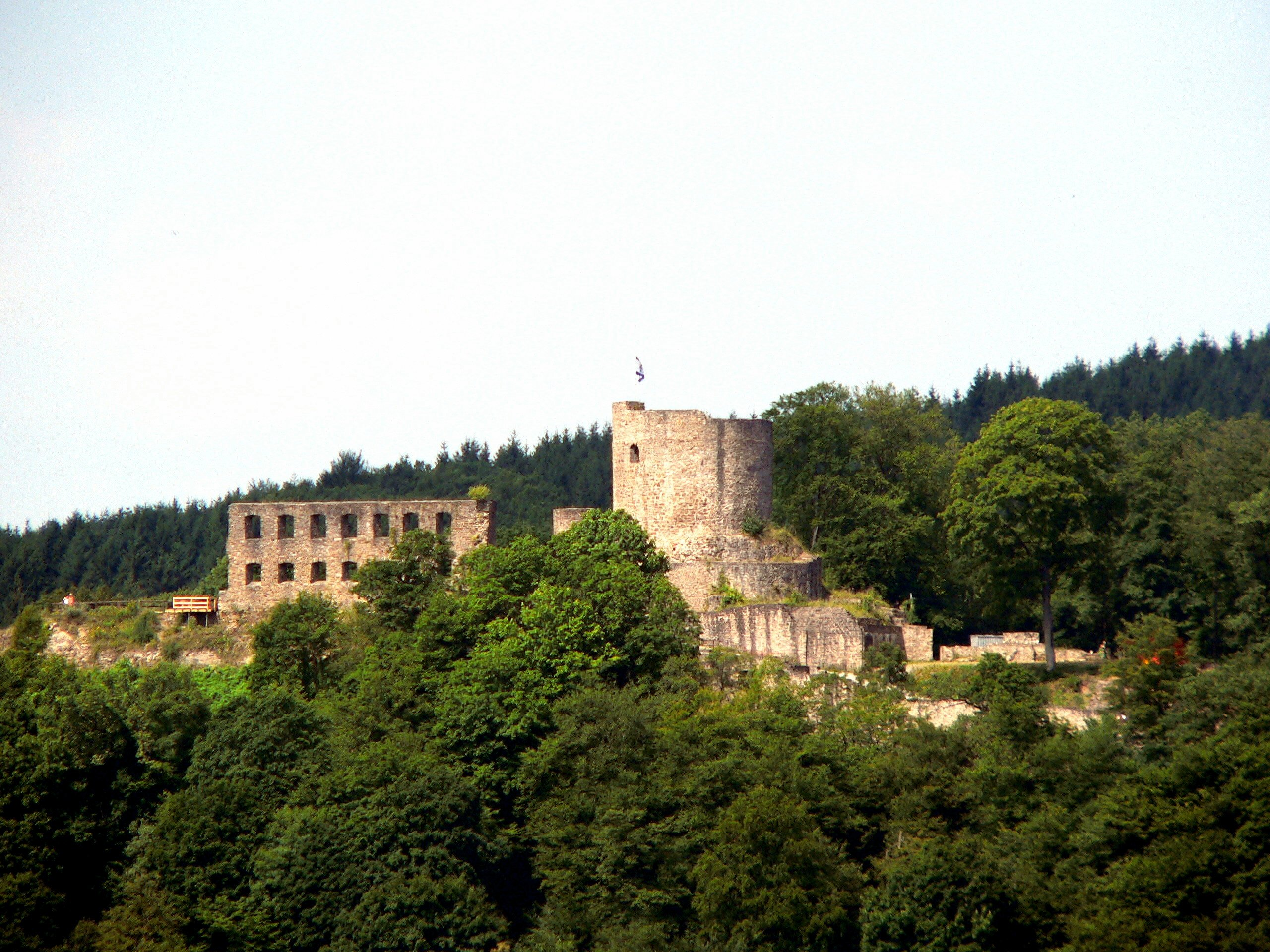
- Windeck Castle

- Coat of arms

- Location of Windeck within Rhein-Sieg-Kreis district
- Interactive map of Windeck
- Location within Germany Location within North Rhine-Westphalia
- Coordinates: 50°48′00″N 7°34′00″E
- Country: Germany
- State: North Rhine-Westphalia
- Admin. region: Köln
- District: Rhein-Sieg-Kreis
- Subdivisions: 66

Government
  - Mayor (2018–23): Alexandra Christine Gauß (Greens)

Area
  - Total: 107.22 km^{2} (41.40 sq mi)
- Elevation: 143 m (469 ft)

Population (2025-12-31)
  - Total: 19,482
  - Density: 181.70/km^{2} (470.60/sq mi)
- Time zone: UTC+01:00 (CET)
  - Summer (DST): UTC+02:00 (CEST)
- Postal codes: 51570
- Dialling codes: 02292 (Rosbach, Dattenfeld, Schladern, Leuscheid, Hurst), 02243 (Herchen), 02682 (Au), 02686 (Kocherscheid), 02295 (Gutmannseichen)
- Vehicle registration: SU
- Website: https://gemeinde-windeck.de/

Windeck (German pronunciation: [ˈvɪndɛk]) is a municipality in the Rhein-Sieg district, in North Rhine-Westphalia, Germany. It is situated on the river Sieg, approx. 35 km east of Bonn and 35 km west of Siegen. The name Windeck comes from the Windeck castle ruins and the nearby village of Windeck.

The community of Windeck was formed in 1969 through the merger of the communities of Dattenfeld, Herchen and Rosbach. Today Windeck consists of 58 villages and some hamlets and homesteads. The most populated are:

Population figures as of March 31, 2019
Village	Population
Rosbach	4009
Dattenfeld	2287
Leuscheid	1171
Schladern	1128
Herchen	974
Hurst	815
Wilberhofen	532
Halscheid	309

Other villages are Oppertzau, Dreisel, Werfen, Stromberg and Au an der Sieg.

In Windeck, the Leina company produces first aid kits and warning triangles.

== Population ==
Historical population

Year	Pop.	±% p.a.
1965	16,120	—
1970	16,886	+0.93%
1975	17,468	+0.68%
1980	17,655	+0.21%
1985	17,630	−0.03%
1990	18,456	+0.92%
1995	19,892	+1.51%

Year	Pop.	±% p.a.
2000	20,811	+0.91%
2005	21,152	+0.33%
2010	20,455	−0.67%
2015	18,931	−1.54%
2020	18,869	−0.07%
2025	19,482	+0.64%

Source: Landesdatabank Nordrhein-Westfalen

== Transport ==
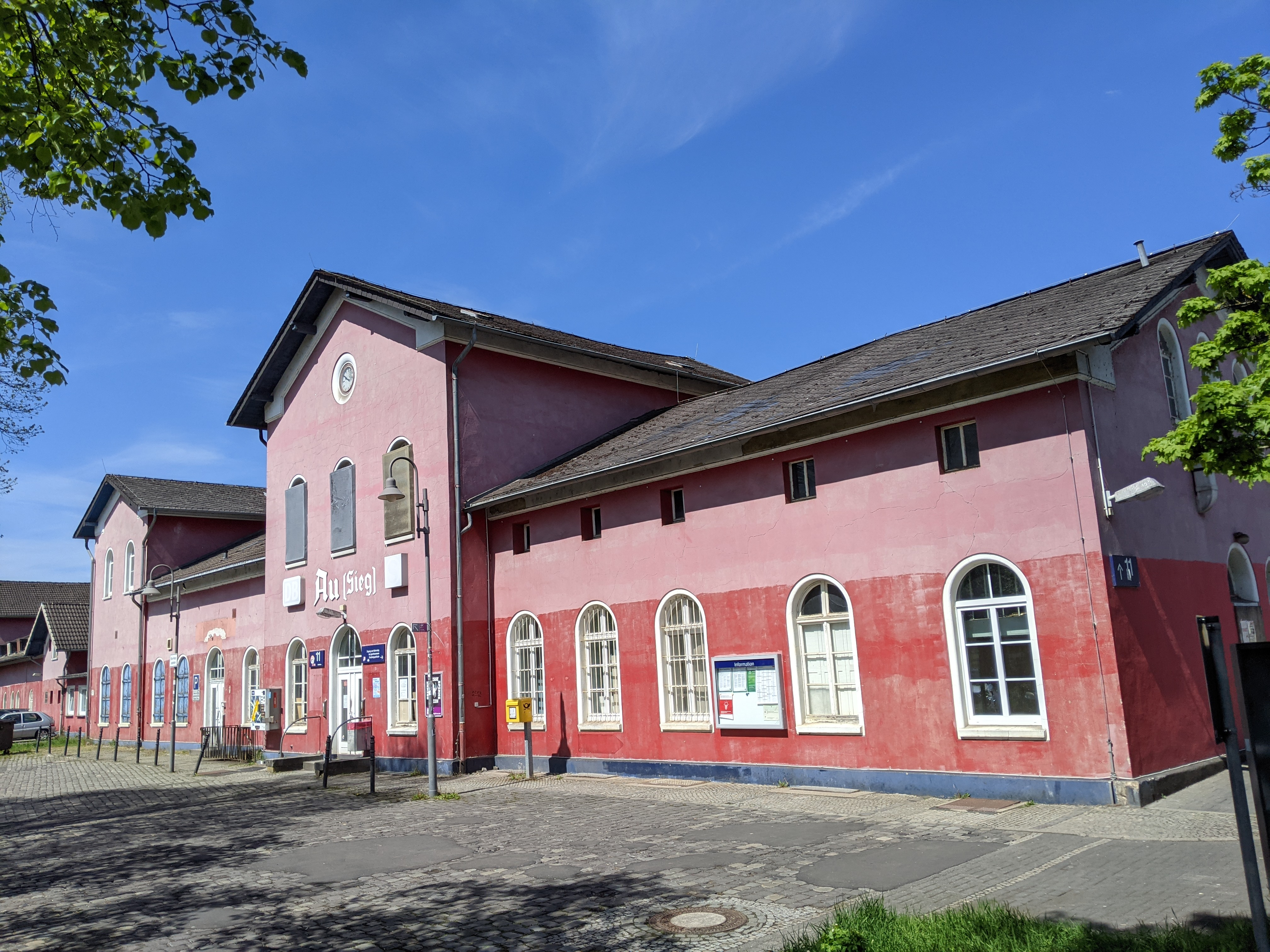
Au (Sieg) station at the Sieg railway and the Engers-Au railway

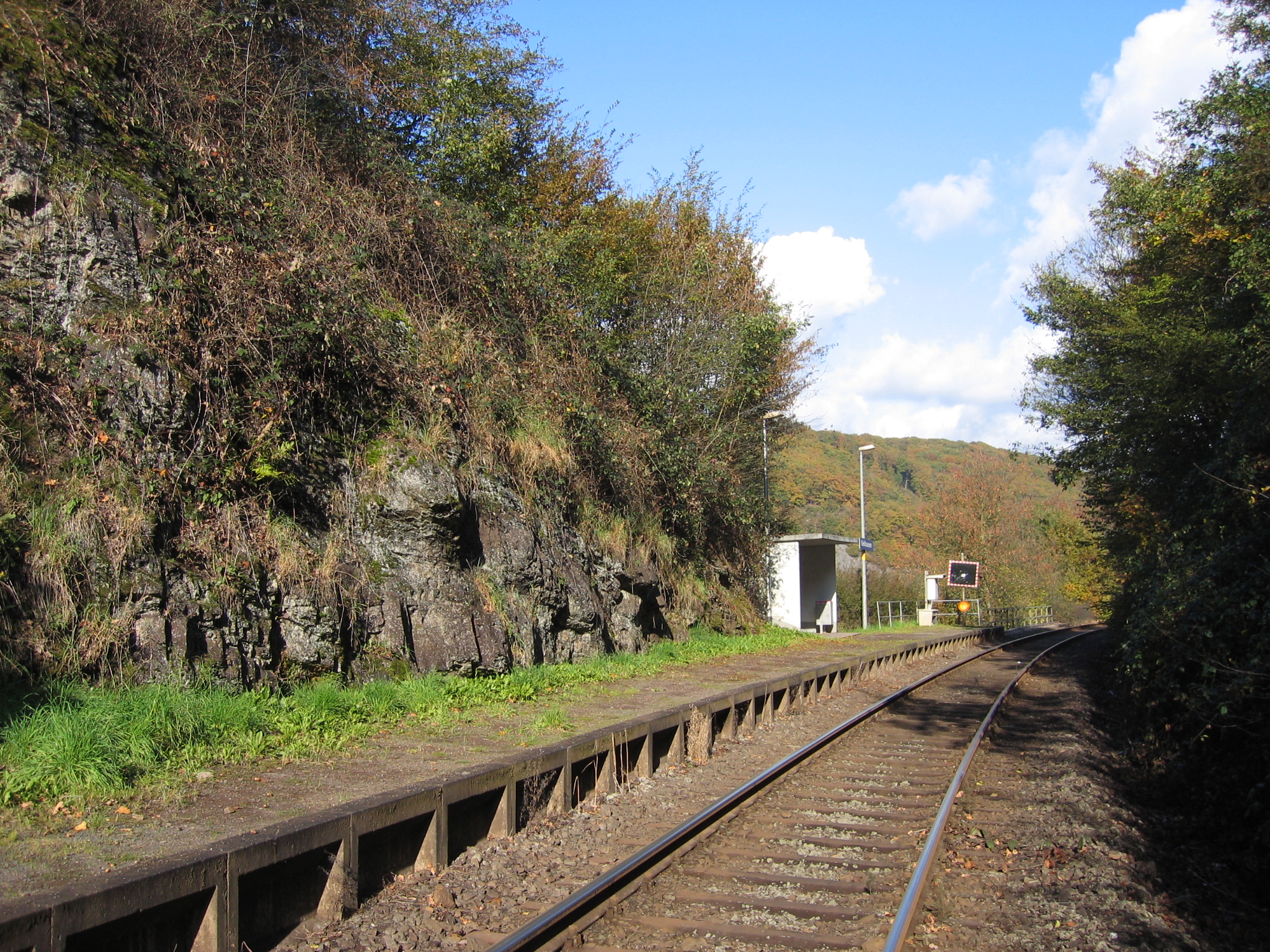
Geilhausen train stop at the Engers–Au railway

In Au (Sieg), Dattenfeld, Geilhausen, Herchen, Roßbach and Schladern train stops and stations are located. Windeck is served by the lines RE9 (Rhein-Sieg-Express) and S12 and S19 of Cologne S-Bahn of DB as well as RB90 and some rides of RB93 of DreiLänderBahn, a section of Hessische Landesbahn (HLB).

In Au (Sieg) station there is a Bike and Ride facility and a Park and Ride parking lot.

Windeck is located in the area of the transport association Verkehrsverbund Rhein-Sieg (VRS), in the fare zone number 2597.

== Notable people ==
- Andy Borg (born 1960), percussionist and presenter, lived briefly in Herchen
- Renan Demirkan (born 1955), actress and author, lives in Windeck
- Hanns Dieter Hüsch (1925–2005), cabaret artist, lived in Werfen
- Peter Praet (born 1949 in Herchen), Belgian economist and central banker
- Jonas Reckermann (born 1979), beach volleyball player
- August Sander (1876–1964), photographer, lived in Kuchhausen
