= S19 (Cologne S-Bahn) =

Railway line in Cologne, Germany

Line S19 is a S-Bahn line of the S-Bahn Köln network in Germany. It is the youngest line in that network. It is operated by DB Regio with class 423 electric multiple units.

The S19 runs until the early evening from Düren via Cologne to Blankenberg (Sieg), Herchen or Au (Sieg) on Monday to Saturday and between Düren and Hennef (Sieg) on Sundays and public holidays. Services to/from Herchen or Au do not stop in Blankenberg. It shares most of this route with line S12, but it runs through Cologne/Bonn Airport instead of through Porz. It operates every 20 minutes between Düren and Hennef (Sieg), with one course every hour extending to Blankenberg or Herchen and another to Au (Sieg). Since December 2019, it has runs all night, every night between Düren and Hennef, every 30 minutes between 9 pm and 4 am.

Two trips of the S19 are extended every night to/from Aachen in order to provide connections between Aachen and the Cologne Bonn Airport.

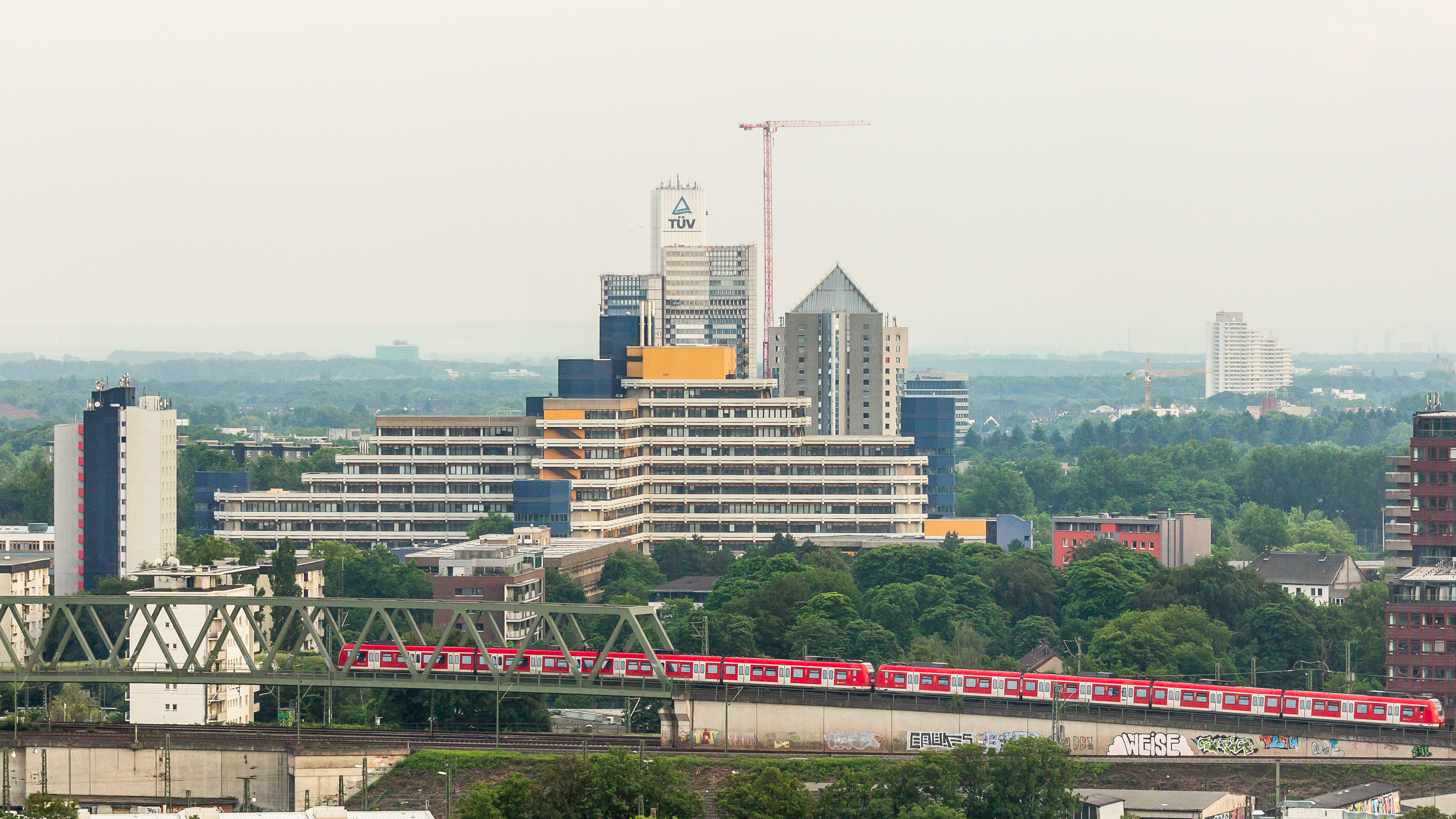
In the foreground, the S-Bahn track runs between Köln-Messe/Deutz and Trimbornstraße.

== History ==
The route runs on the Cologne–Aachen line (opened by the Rhenish Railway Company between Cologne and Horrem in three stages between 1839 and 1841), the East Rhine Railway (opened to Troisdorf by the Rhenish Railway in 1870, with an extension to Cologne opened in 1874), the Cologne Airport loop (opened in 2004) and the Sieg Railway (opened by the Cologne-Minden Railway Company between 1859 and 1862).

When the line was established in December 2014, it was mostly extending existing courses of the line S13 and giving them an own name for clarity reasons. With time, the S19 replaced many courses of the S13, eventually leading to the total replacement of the S13 through the S19. In 2025, it is planned to reestablish the S13 as a separate line to the S19. The S13 is planned to operate between Bonn-Beuel and Düren every 20 minutes, while the S19 is planned to operate between Au (Sieg) and Köln-Nippes every 20 minutes.
