= Horrem station =

Railway station in Kerpen, Germany

Horrem
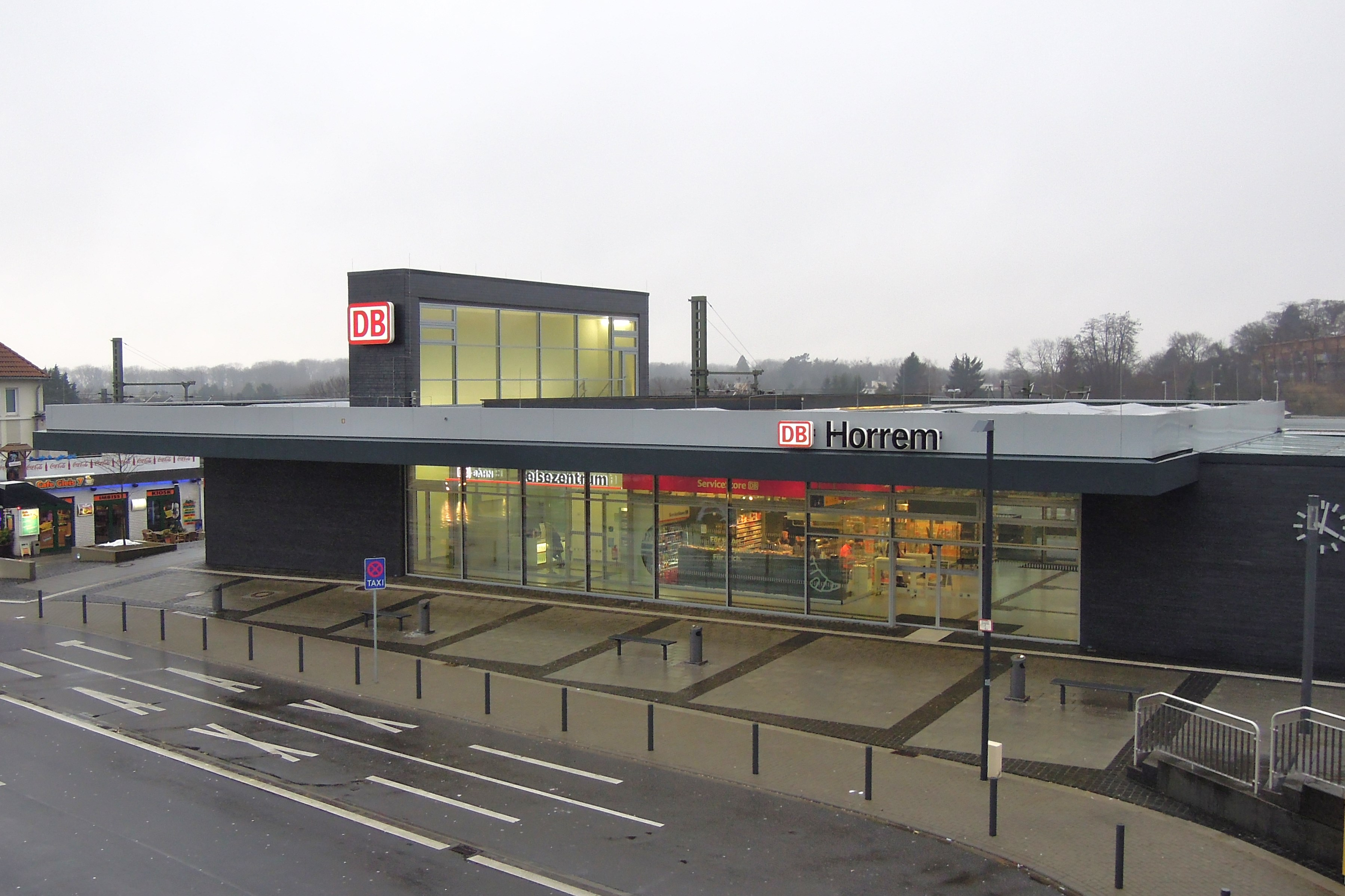

General information
- Location: Bahnhofstr. 9, Horrem, North Rhine-Westphalia; Germany
- Coordinates: 50°54′59″N 6°42′53″E
- Owner: Deutsche Bahn
- Operator: DB Netz; DB Station&Service
- Lines: Cologne–Aachen high-speed railway (KBS 480); Erft Railway (KBS 481)

Construction
- Accessible: Yes

Other information
- Station code: 2919
- DS100 code: KHR
- IBNR: 8000178
- Category: 3
- Fare zone: VRS: 2870
- Website: www.bahnhof.de

History
- Opened: 6 September 1841

Services
Preceding station	DB Regio NRW	Following station
Düren towards Aachen Hbf	RE 9	Köln-Ehrenfeld towards Siegen Hbf
Quadrath-Ichendorf towards Bedburg	RB 38	Köln-Ehrenfeld towards Köln Messe/Deutz
Preceding station	National Express Germany	Following station
Düren towards Aachen Hbf	RE 1 (NRW-Express)	Köln-Ehrenfeld towards Hamm (Westf) Hbf
Preceding station	Cologne S-Bahn	Following station
Sindorf Terminus	S12	Frechen-Königsdorf towards Au (Sieg)
Sindorf towards Düren	S19	Frechen-Königsdorf towards Au (Sieg)
Location
- Location within North Rhine-Westphalia Location within Germany Location within Europe

Horrem station is a station in the Kerpen district of Horrem in the German state of North Rhine-Westphalia. It is a railway junction of the Cologne–Aachen high-speed railway and the Erft Railway (Horrem–Bedburg, connecting with Neuss). The triangular station of Horrem is served by regional services and by S-Bahn trains of the Cologne S-Bahn. Long-distance trains run through on the high-speed line without stopping. It is classified by Deutsche Bahn as a category 3 station.

== History ==
The station was opened on 6 September 1841 along with the Lövenich–Aachen section of the Cologne–Aachen railway. The station building was demolished in 2012 and completely rebuilt in 2013. The new station building was built as part of a pilot project of Deutsche Bahn's StationGreen XL-Modul program, strictly according to ecological principles and equipped with eco-friendly technology. Until 2001, Horrem station had a freight yard to its north. There are commuter parking spaces in this area. The forecourt and entrance building were fundamentally rebuilt from 2010 to 2014. A "green station" was built, with CO_{2}-neutral operations. This involved the installation of photovoltaic and geothermal systems and the use of ecological building materials.

== Station building ==
It has two island platform tracks for operations on the Erft Railway, which branches off from the Cologne-Aachen line at the station and four platform tracks and three through tracks for operations on the high-speed line. The station now a waiting room, a kiosk and a bookshop in the entrance building. In front of the station, there is a bus station with six platforms served by VRS bus routes towards Bergheim, Bedburg, Elsdorf, Erftstadt, Frechen, Hücheln, Hürth, Kerpen, Königshoven and Sindorf. The station forecourt and bus station were rebuilt to a different design between 2010 and 2014.

== Operations ==
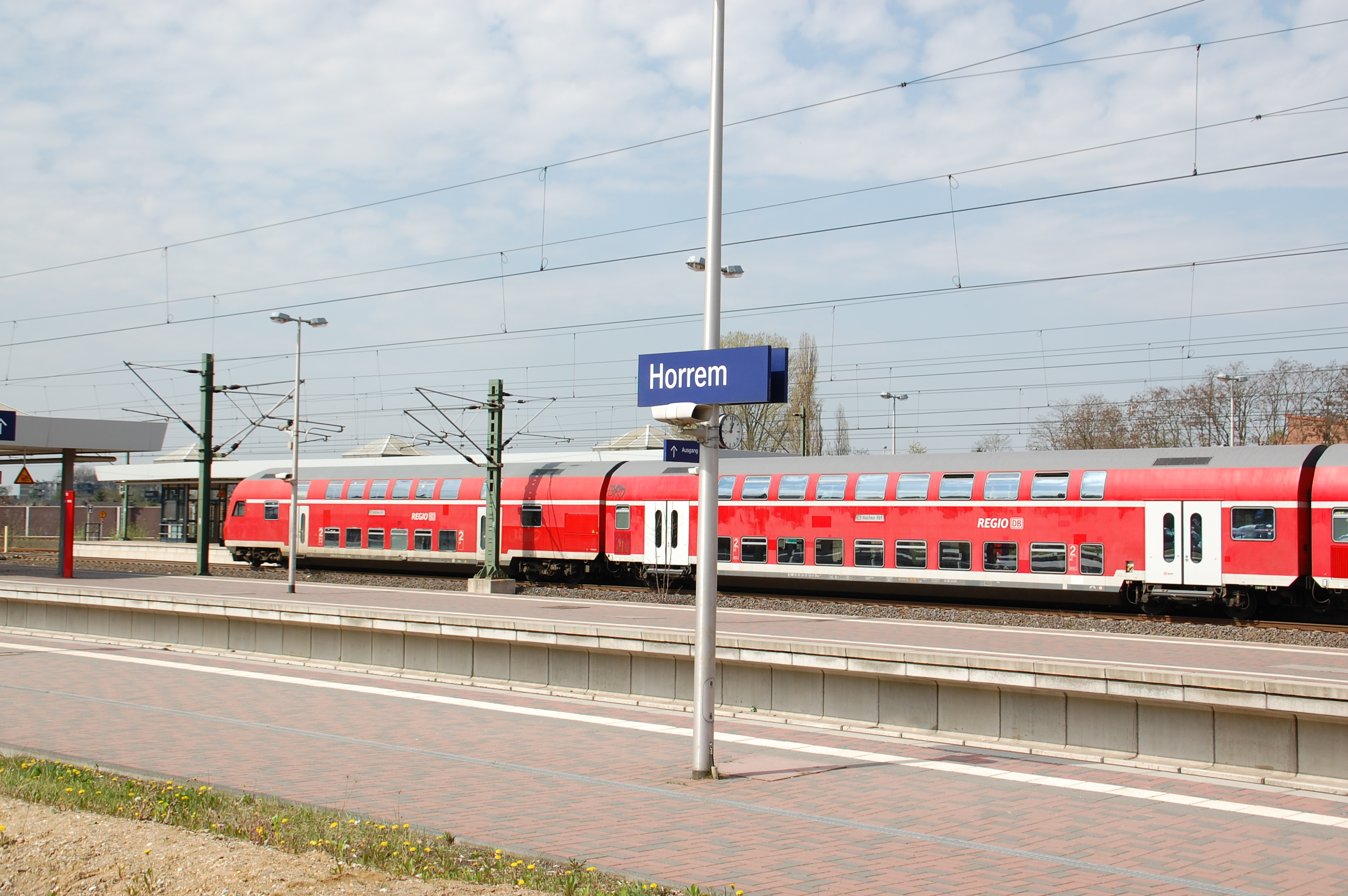
Regional-Express at platform

Horrem station is served by the NRW-Express (between Aachen and Hamm), the Rhein-Sieg-Express (between Aachen and Siegen) and the Erft-Bahn (between Cologne and Düsseldorf), each running hourly. It is also served by Cologne S-Bahn lines S19 between Düren and Hennef (Sieg), Blankenberg (Sieg), Herchen or Au (Sieg) every 20 minutes Monday–Saturday and S12 between Sindorf or Düren and Troisdorf every 60 minutes Monday–Saturday. Together these provide four services an hour through Cologne on working days and three services an hour on Sunday.

Line	Line name	Route
RE 1	NRW-Express	Aachen Hbf – Düren – Horrem – Cologne Hbf – Düsseldorf Hbf – Duisburg Hbf – Essen Hbf – Dortmund Hbf – Hamm (Westf)
RE 9	Rhein-Sieg-Express	Aachen Hbf – Düren – Horrem – Cologne Hbf – Siegburg/Bonn – Siegen
RB 38	Erft-Bahn	Cologne Hbf – Horrem – Bedburg (Erft)
S12	Cologne S-Bahn	(Sindorf –) Horrem – Köln-Ehrenfeld – Cologne Hbf – Troisdorf (– Siegburg/Bonn – Hennef (– Au))
S19	Cologne S-Bahn	Düren – Horrem – Cologne Hbf – Cologne/Bonn Airport – Troisdorf – Siegburg/Bonn – Hennef (– Au)

== Nord-Süd-Bahn ==
On the eastern edge of Horrem is the North-South Railway (Nord-Süd-Bahn) of RWE Power (formerly Rheinbraun). Lignite and overburden are transported on this industrial railway between mines and coal-fired power stations. At the point where it crosses the railway line between Cologne and Aachen, the then longest reinforced concrete bridge in Germany built was built in 1953/54. This was necessary, because the roof of the 1623-metre long Königendorf tunnel was removed to enable its electrification and it was converted into a deep cutting. The tunnel was built in 1840 for the Belgium–Aachen–Cologne railway.
