= Au (Sieg) station =

Railway station in Windeck, Germany

Au (Sieg)
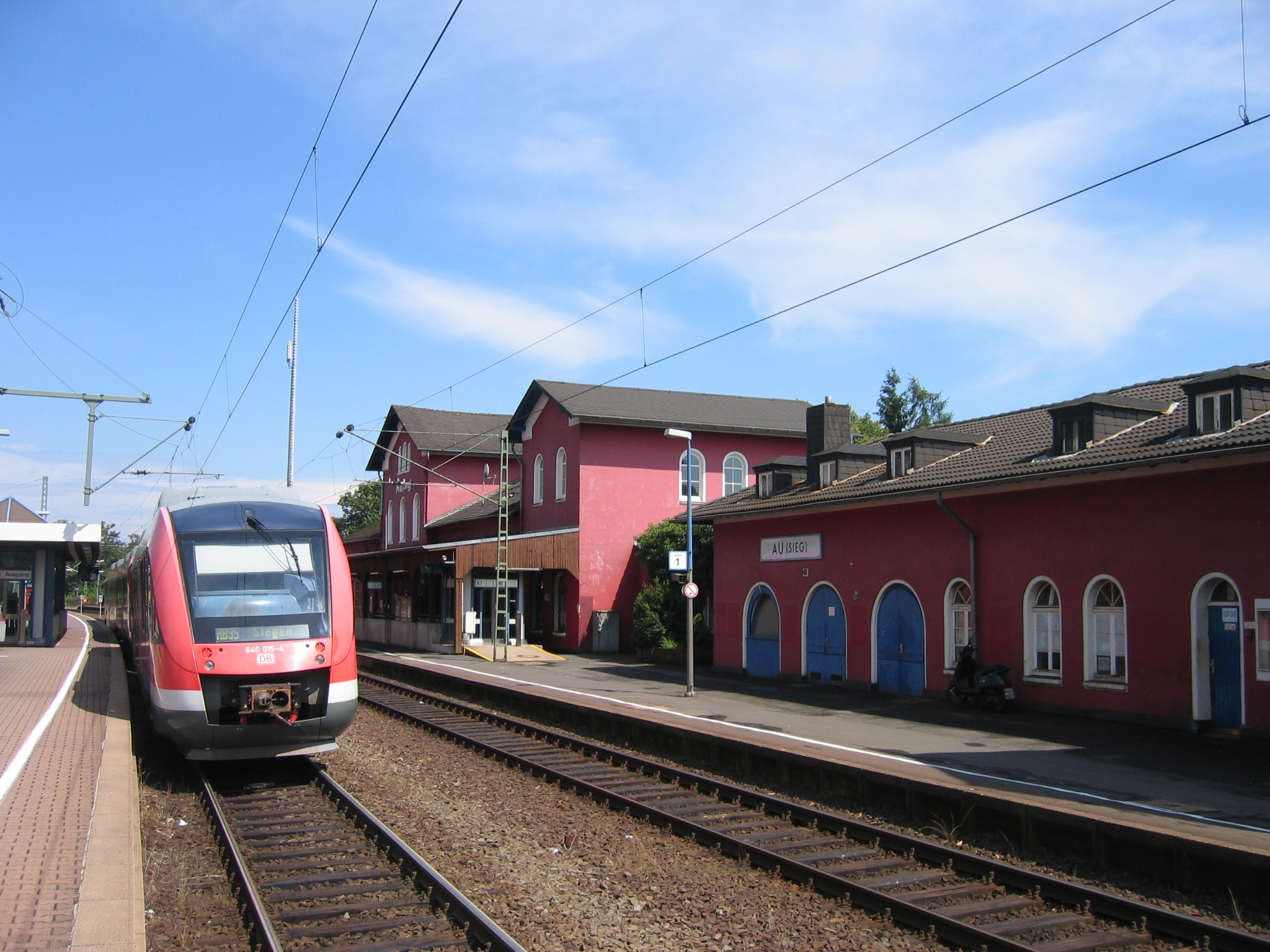

General information
- Location: Bahnhofstr. 24, Au (Sieg), Windeck, NRW; Germany
- Coordinates: 50°46′24″N 7°39′24″E
- Owner: Deutsche Bahn
- Operator: DB Netz; DB Station&Service
- Lines: Sieg Railway (KBS 460); Engers–Au railway (KBS 461)
- Platforms: 6

Construction
- Accessible: Yes

Other information
- Station code: 204
- DS100 code: KAU
- IBNR: 8000012
- Category: 3
- Fare zone: VRS: 2597
- Website: www.bahnhof.de

History
- Opened: August 1860

Services
Preceding station	DB Regio NRW	Following station
Schladern towards Aachen Hbf	RE 9	Wissen towards Siegen Hbf
Preceding station	Hessische Landesbahn	Following station
Geilhausen towards Limburg (Lahn)	RB 90	Etzbach towards Siegen Hbf
Preceding station	Cologne S-Bahn	Following station
Rosbach towards Horrem	S12	Terminus
Rosbach towards Düren	S19	Terminus
Location

Au (Sieg) station is a railway junction in the town of Au in the municipality of Windeck, which is in the German state of North Rhine-Westphalia. It lies on the Sieg Railway to Siegen, where the Engers–Au railway branches off to Altenkirchen, where it connects with the Upper Westerwald Railway (Oberwesterwaldbahn). Despite the town’s small population, the junction station is important for commuters from the districts of Altenkirchen, Neuwied and Westerwaldkreis for its connections towards Siegen, Cologne, Bonn, Düsseldorf and Aachen.

== History ==
Au station was opened in August 1860 as part of the Deutz–Gießen railway by the Cologne-Minden Railway Company (Cöln-Mindener Eisenbahn-Gesellschaft). The Engers–Au railway (Oberwesterwaldbahn, Upper Westerwald Railway) to Altenkirchen was opened in May 1887, connecting to Engers. Thus, it became a railway junction with an enlarged track layout.

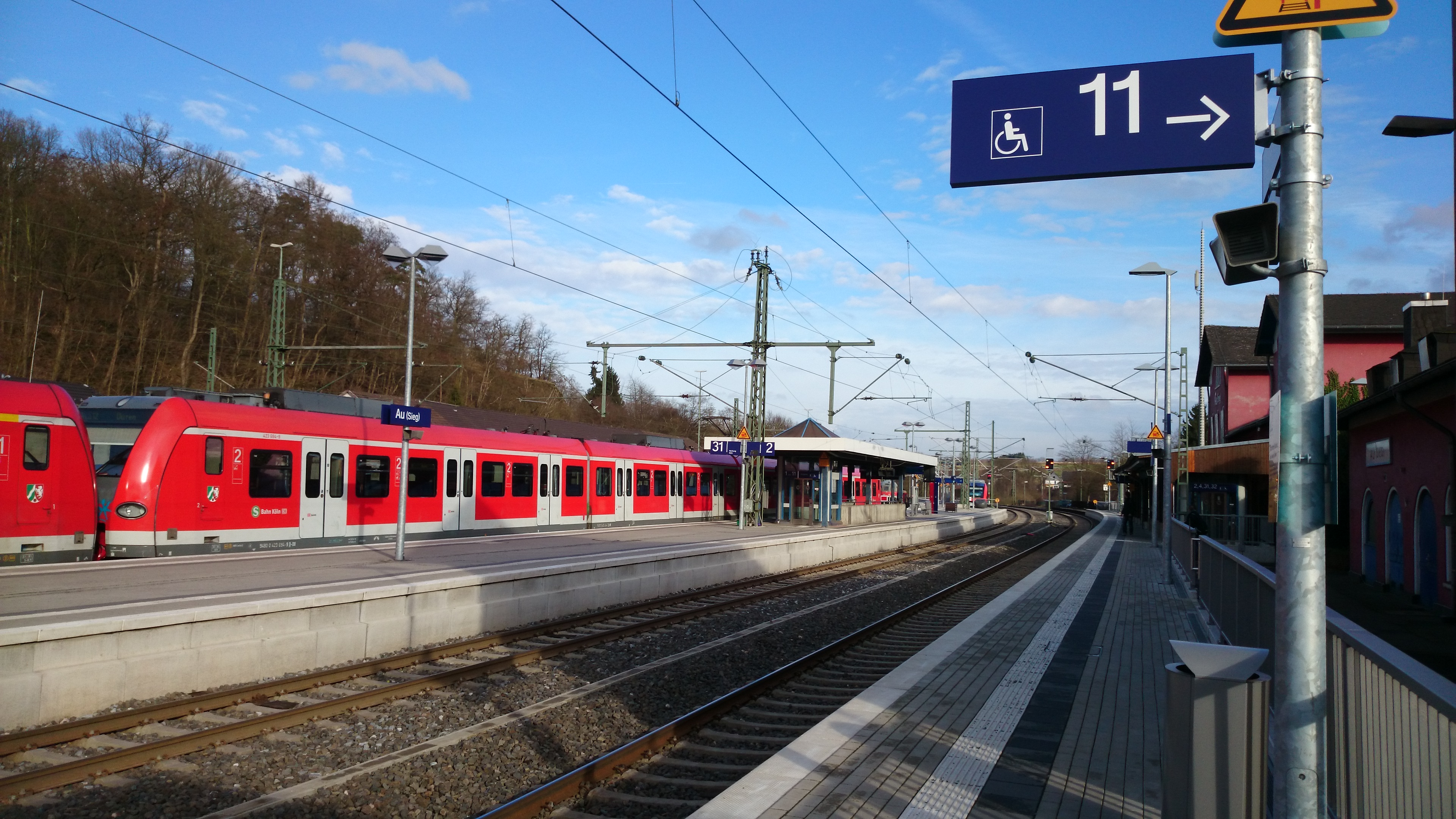
Au (Sieg) station after modernisation

Since 2 June 1991, Au station has been the terminus of Cologne S-Bahn line S12. Since the modernisation of the track layout, which was completed at the end of 2013, Au (Sieg) station has had six platforms that are used in regular operations.

== Transport connections ==
Au (Sieg) station has a park and ride (P+R) and a bike and ride (B+R) faciality. There used to be a station restaurant in the station, which nowadays is used as a community center of the group DIE STATION, supporterd by the NGO Kulturhafen Au, located in the district Au of Windeck. The station had a ticket office, which was operated by Westerwaldbahn GmbH (WEBA), that nowadays serves ticket centers in the stations Wissen (Sieg) and Betzdorf.(Sieg). The neighbouring municipalities of Hamm an der Sieg and Fürthen and the shores of the Sieg are within walking distance. The station, however, serves mainly as an interchange station.

Due to the location of the station in the municipality of Windeck in the Rhein-Sieg district, it is located in the network of the Verkehrsverbund Rhein-Sieg (Rhine-Sieg Transport Association) as well as the fare association Rheinland-Tarif.

Until the introduction of the 2014/2015 timetable in December 2014, Au (Sieg) station was the terminus of two Regionalbahn lines. The RB 90 (previously RB 28, Oberwesterwaldbahn) service from Limburg (Lahn) via Diez Ost, Westerburg, Hachenburg and Altenkirchen ended in Au (Sieg). The RB 95 (Sieg-Dill-Bahn) service ran from Dillenburg via Siegen and Betzdorf (Sieg) to Au (Sieg). With the 2014/2015 timetable change, these two lines became a single through service, the RB 90 (Westerwald-Sieg-Bahn).

Until 2004, the services of the Dreiländerbahn, which also included the RB 28 until 2004 and the RB 95 until 2013, were operated by DB Regio. In 2004, Vectus Verkehrsgesellschaft took over the operations of the Upper Westerwald Railway between Limburg (Lahn) and Au (Sieg). In 2014, after winning the contract, the network of the Dreiländerbahn was taken over by Hessische Landesbahn GmbH (HLB). With the extension of the RB 90 to Siegen, the RB 95 service now runs only between Dillenburg and Siegen.

On the main line (the Sieg Railway from Cologne to Siegen), it is served by the Rhein-Sieg-Express, running from Aachen via Cologne and Betzdorf to Siegen (RE 9), along with the S-Bahn S 12 services from Horrem and on week days by S19 services from Düren. All services operate hourly. Services in 2025 were as follows:

Line	Route	Interval
RE 9	Rhein-Sieg-Express; Aachen – Düren – Köln Hansaring – Cologne – Köln Messe/Deutz – Siegburg/Bonn – Hennef – Au (Sieg) – Betzdorf – Siegen Hbf	60 min
RB 90	Westerwald-Sieg-Bahn; Siegen Hbf – Betzdorf (Sieg) – Au (Sieg) – Altenkirchen – Hachenburg – Nistertal-Bad Marienberg – Westerburg – Diez Ost - Limburg	60 min
S12	Cologne S-Bahn; Horrem – Köln Hansaring – Cologne Hbf – Köln Messe/Deutz – Porz – Siegburg/Bonn – Hennef – Au (Sieg)	60 min
S19	Cologne S-Bahn; Düren – Horrem – Köln Hansaring – Cologne Hbf – Köln Messe/Deutz – Cologne/Bonn Airport – Siegburg/Bonn – Hennef – Au (Sieg)	60 min

== Other means of transport ==
Near the station there is a bus stop, where the buses of route 299 (Hamm an der Sieg – Au (Sieg) station – Hilgenroth – Altenkirchen station) stop.

Also the local bus lines 282, 284 and 288 serve Au (Sieg).

There is a taxi stand in front of the station.

Also a Park-and-ride lot as well as a bike-and-ride facility are located at the train station.

The station is located on the area of the transport association Verkehrsverbund Rhein-Sieg (VRS) and the fare association Rheinland-Tarif.

== Others ==
The station building is used as a cultural center called "DIE STATION" which is organized by the NGO "Kulturhafen Au Sieg".

== Weblinks ==
- Bahnhof.de, Au(Sieg) station
- DIE STATION Au (Sieg)
- The NGO Kulturhafen Au e. V.
- Au (Sieg) station on Zielbahnhof.de
- Au (Sieg) station at Stellwerke.info
