= Düren station =

Railway station in Düren, Germany

Düren
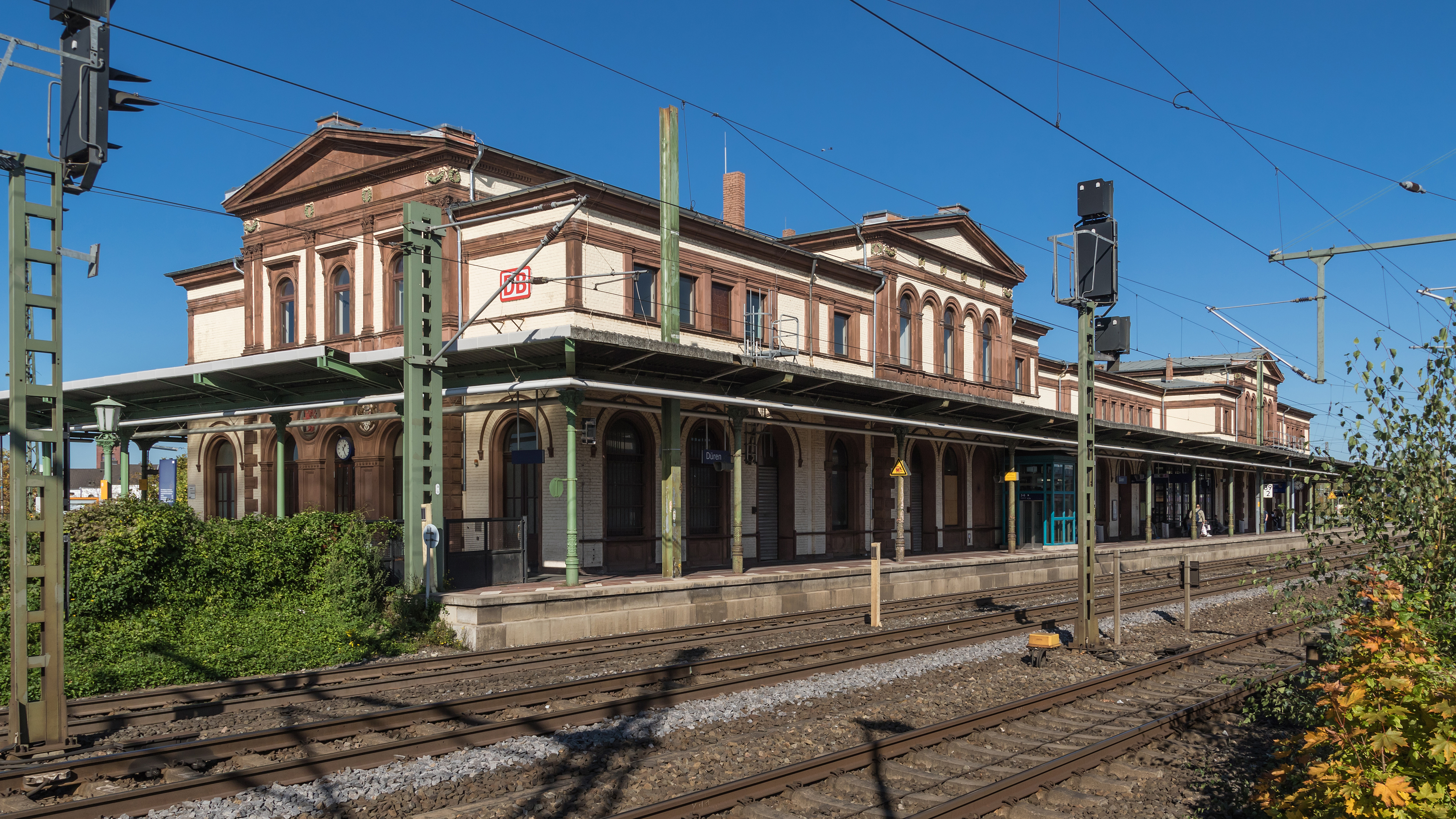
- Station building and tracks, in 2017

General information
- Location: Hauptbahnhof 1, Düren, North Rhine-Westphalia; Germany
- Coordinates: 50°48′39″N 6°28′57″E
- Owner: Deutsche Bahn
- Operator: DB Netz; DB Station&Service
- Lines: Cologne–Aachen; Düren–Heimbach; Jülich–Düren; Düren–Euskirchen; Düren–Neuss (closed); Düren–Distelrath (closed)
- Platforms: 8

Construction
- Accessible: Yes

Other information
- Station code: 1392
- DS100 code: KDN
- IBNR: 8000084
- Category: 3
- Fare zone: AVV: 70; VRS: 3600 (AVV transitional tariff)
- Website: www.bahnhof.de

History
- Opened: 1 September 1841

Services
Preceding station	DB Fernverkehr	Following station
Aachen Hbf Terminus	ICE 14	Köln Hbf towards Berlin Ostbahnhof
Aachen Hbf One-way operation	ICE 19	Köln Hbf towards Berlin Ostbahnhof
Preceding station	DB Regio NRW	Following station
Langerwehe towards Aachen Hbf	RE 9	Horrem towards Siegen Hbf
Langerwehe towards Heerlen	RB 20	Terminus
Preceding station	National Express Germany	Following station
Langerwehe towards Aachen Hbf	RE 1 (NRW-Express)	Horrem towards Hamm (Westf) Hbf
Preceding station	Rurtalbahn	Following station
Im Großen Tal towards Linnich SIG Combibloc	RB 21 Northern Branch	Terminus
Terminus	RB 21 Southern Branch	Annakirmesplatz towards Heimbach
Terminus	RB 28 via Zülpich	Nörvenich-Binsfeld towards Euskirchen
Preceding station	Cologne S-Bahn	Following station
Terminus	S19	Merzenich towards Au (Sieg)
Location

Düren station is located to the north of the centre of Düren and is the largest station in the city and the district of Düren. It is located at the intersection of the Cologne–Aachen high-speed line with the lines to Linnich, Heimbach and Euskirchen. Until 1992 it was also connected to the Erft Railway.

The train is served by Regional-Express, Regionalbahn and S-Bahn trains. It is the terminus of the line S19 of the Cologne S-Bahn. The station was opened on 1 September 1841 by the Rhenish Railway Company on its original line from Cologne to Belgium.

== History ==
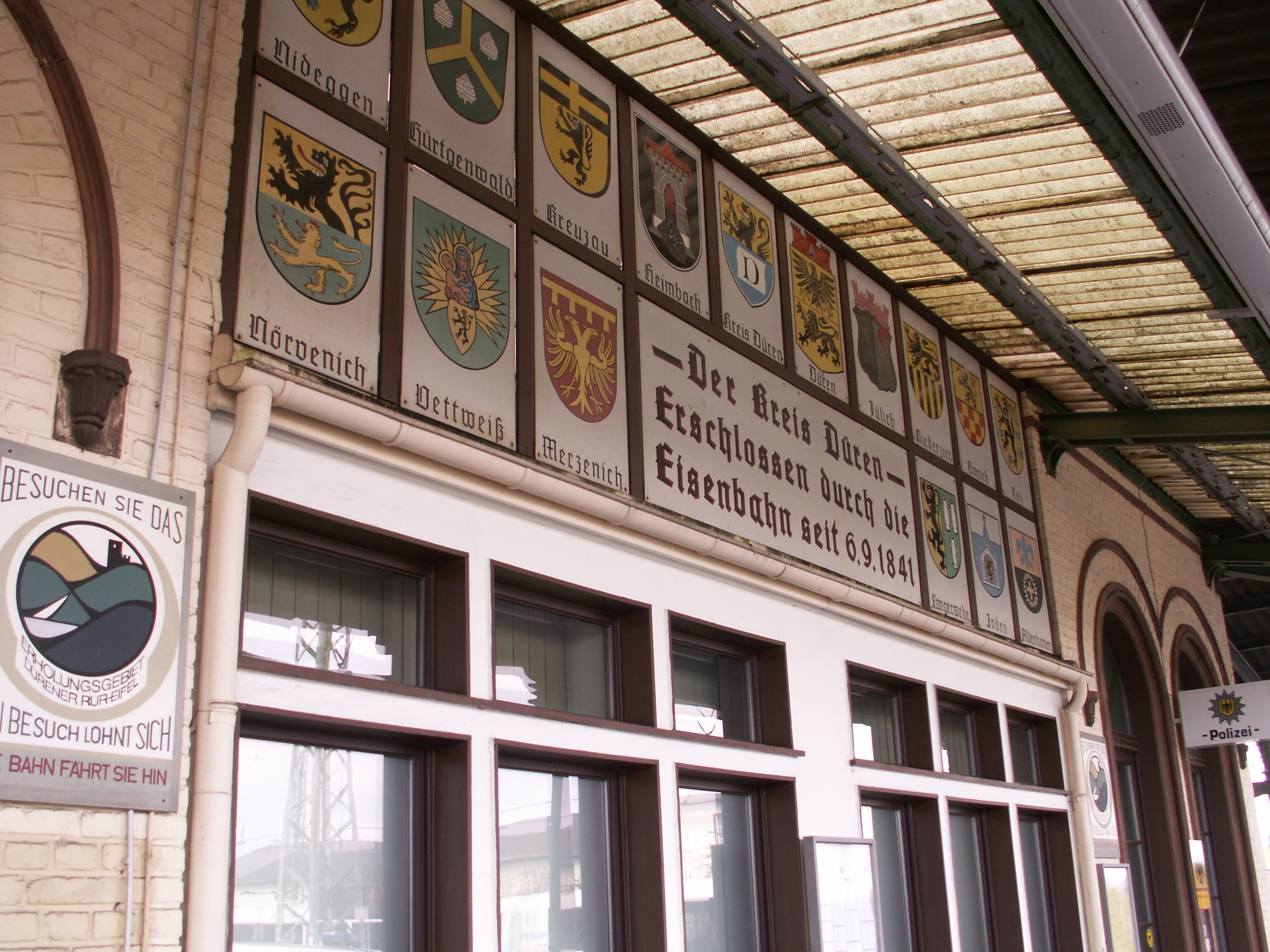
Part of the station opened in 1841

Düren station was established on 1 September 1841 with the opening of the Aachen–Düren–Cologne line. The station became more and more important during the period of industrialisation. This resulted in the opening of the following lines:

1864	Düren – Euskirchen
1869	Düren – Bedburg – Neuss
1873	Düren – Jülich – Linnich
1903	Düren – Heimbach

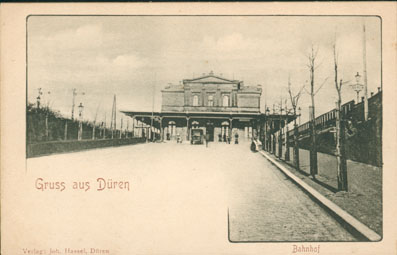
Düren station in 1920

Due to its ever-improving accessibility Düren was served by increasing numbers of express trains on the various lines. Thus, there were express trains via Euskirchen to Bonn and via Bedburg and Neuss to Düsseldorf.

A depot for the maintenance of locomotives was also built at Düren. It was originally located immediately next to the station. In 1930, construction began on a new railway depot, which was located on the Aachen–Cologne line towards Merzenich. The construction took about three years and it became operational in 1933.

Unlike the rest of Düren, which was destroyed by the attacks of the Allies, the station was largely unscathed by World War II. During the war, the engine depot was badly damaged and it was only partially rebuilt after the war. Consequently, Düren depot lost its importance.

=== Post-war ===
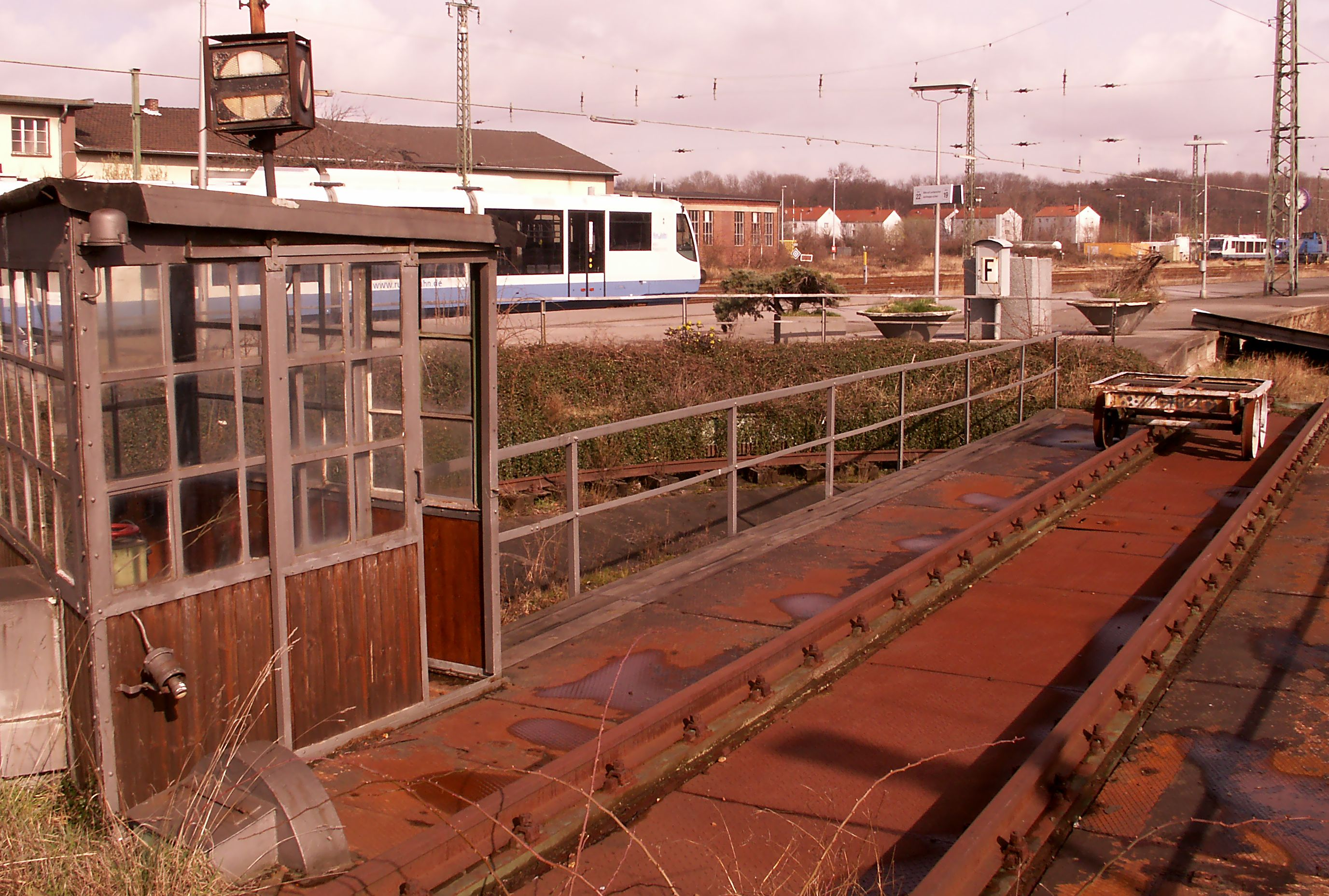
Old turntable and Rurtalbahn train in the station

The great destruction of Düren during World War II reduced the city's financial resources. Decades old plans for remodelling the tracks and the construction of a new station building were therefore not implemented. Nevertheless, on 15 May 1949, D-Züge (express trains operated using coaches with corridors) began serving Düren station again. There were two express services: one from Brussels via Aachen, Cologne and Wiesbaden to Frankfurt, the second from Aachen via Cologne, Wiesbaden, Heidelberg, Stuttgart and Ulm to Munich. Thus, it was possible to travel from Düren without changing at Cologne or Aachen.

Following a significant fall in freight traffic, Düren depot closed on 1 July 1986 and was demolished three years later. As a result, Düren became a hub almost entirely for passenger services with little freight transport. In the next few decades, an increasing number of fast services stopped in Düren, including InterCity, InterRegio, EuroCity and night trains.

The period of fast services ended with the modernisation of the line in the early 21st century. In December 2002, the last D-Züge on the Cologne–Ostend route and the last night train on the Aachen–Dresden route were abandoned. A year later, the InterCity and night train lines were also modified so that Düren was no longer served by long-distance services. The station was also downgraded to a category 4 station.

The mayor of Düren unsuccessfully tried to get Intercity-Express and Thalys high speed trains on the Aachen–Cologne line to stop at Düren. Deutsche Bahn agreed, however, that the station would be upgraded to category 3 as soon as InterCity or night trains returned to the Aachen-Cologne line.

The upgrading of the Aachen–Düren–Cologne line and the related establishment of a S-Bahn line from Düren to Cologne led to a renewed increase in the importance of the Düren node. However, the Düren–Bedburg line was dismantled, the Düren–Euskirchen line was closed and the Düren–Jülich–Linnich and the Düren–Heimbach lines were sold to the Dürener Kreisbahn (Düren District Railway, DKB). Passenger and freight traffic on the latter lines was subsequently revitalised by the DKB. These services are now operated by Rurtalbahn.

The station building has been preserved until today. With the development of the high-speed line between Cologne and Aachen, Düren station was partially restored and completely modernised. The tracks and platforms were renewed and later the station building was renovated and modernised in stages. During the first stage of the upgrading of the Cologne–Düren line the platforms were all remodelled and upgraded to make them accessible by the disabled. The entrance to the station from Cologne was rebuilt for a top speed of 160 km/h. During the second stage tracks 1 and 2 will be upgraded for 200 km/h operations.

== Service at the station ==
The station is fully accessible with lifts available at all platforms. There are also guidelines on the ground for the blind. Services are available in the station building, including a ticket office, a bookstore, a bank, toilets, lockers and a DB-Service Store. The station also has a Bahnhofsmission (a charity that gives assistance of various sorts at German stations). At the southern exit to the station is a subway to the newly built bicycle parking, which was opened in September 2010 after several months of construction.
