= S12 (Cologne S-Bahn) =

Line S12 is a S-Bahn line of the S-Bahn Köln network in Germany. It is operated by DB Regio using class 423 electric multiple units. The S12 runs from Horrem via Cologne to Au (Sieg). It shares this route for most of its run with the S 19. With over 105 kilometres (65 mi), it is the second longest S-Bahn line in North Rhine-Westphalia, after S9.

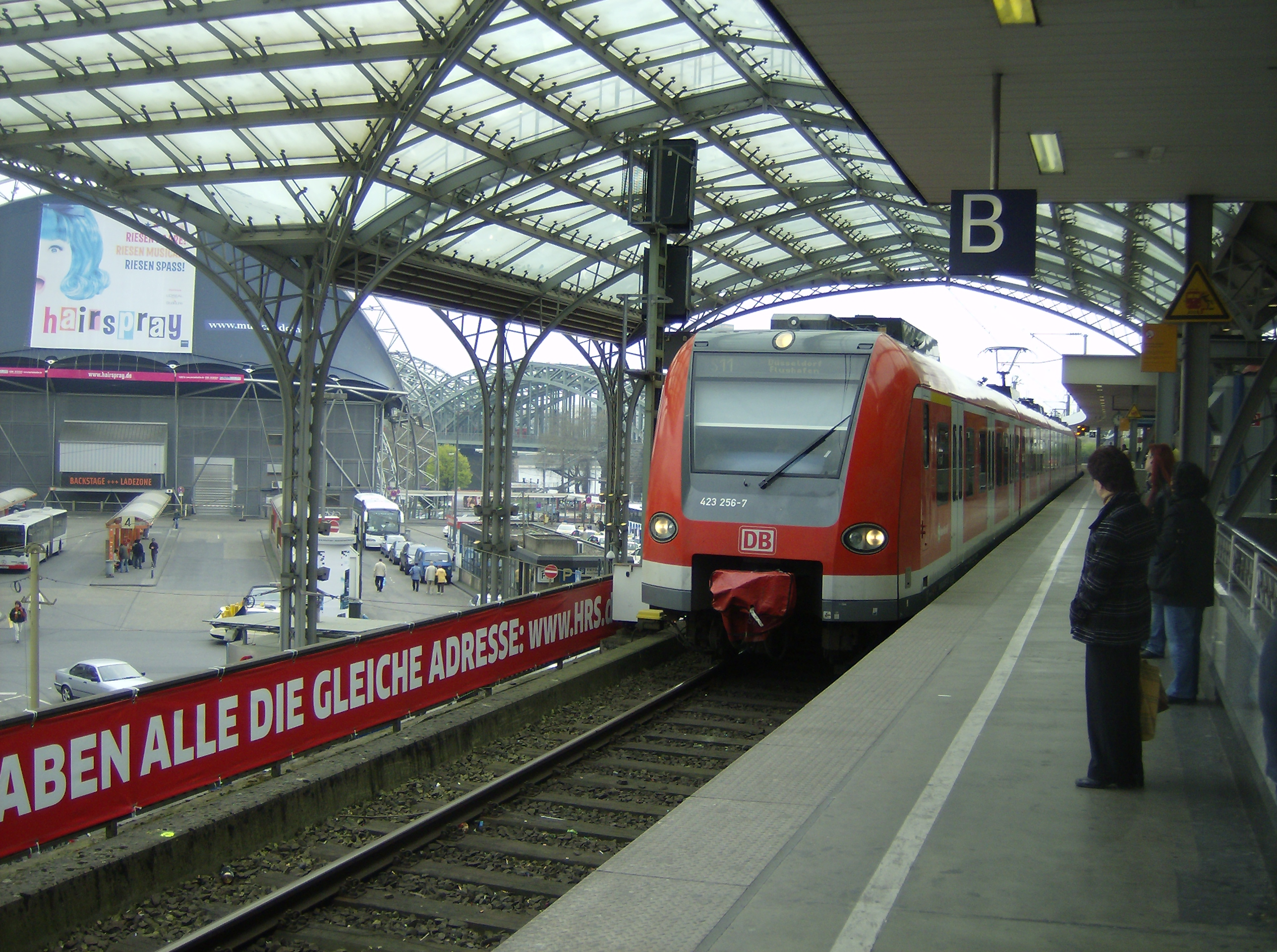

The S12 operates every 20 minutes Monday to Saturday between Köln Ehrenfeld and Hennef (Sieg), with every third train continuing to Au (Sieg). The S19 also operates hourly between Au (Sieg) and Hennef, so there is a service every 30 minutes. One S12 services an hour is extended to Horrem, so with the S19, four trains operate hourly in each direction between Hennef (Sieg), Cologne and Horrem. On Sundays and public holidays, the S12 operates every 30 minutes between Horrem and Au (Sieg).

The route runs on the Cologne–Aachen line (opened by the Rhenish Railway Company between Cologne and Horrem in three stages between 1839 and 1841), the East Rhine Railway (opened to Troisdorf by the Rhenish Railway in 1870, with an extension to Cologne opened in 1874) and the Sieg Railway (opened by the Cologne-Minden Railway Company between 1859 and 1862). The eastern section of the S 12 service from Au (Sieg) to Köln-Nippes was opened on 2 June 1991. It was extended to Düren on 13 June 2004, dropping Köln-Nippes. It was cut back to Horrem in December 2015.
