= Sieg Railway =

Railway line in Germany

Cologne–Siegen railway
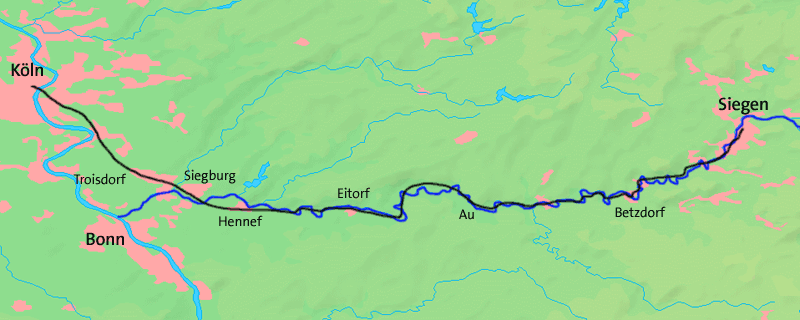

Overview
- Native name: Siegstrecke
- Line number: 2651 (Köln-Deutz–Betzdorf); 2880 (Betzdorf–Siegen); 2621 (Köln-Deutz–Abzw Steinstr., S-Bahn)
- Locale: North Rhine-Westphalia and Rhineland-Palatinate, Germany

Service
- Route number: 460

Technical
- Line length: 100 km (62 mi)
- Track gauge: 1,435 mm (4 ft 8 1/2 in) standard gauge
- Electrification: 15 kV/16.7 Hz AC; Overhead catenary

The Sieg Railway (German: Siegstrecke is a 100-kilometre (62 mi) long, electrified German main line railway between Cologne-Deutz via Porz, Troisdorf, Siegburg, Hennef, Au (Sieg), Betzdorf to Siegen with a through service to Cologne Hauptbahnhof. Although most of it is two-track, two five-kilometre (three-mile) sections are only single track. Both ends of the line are in the state of North Rhine-Westphalia, but between Au and Niederschelden it runs through Rhineland-Palatinate. It is one of the oldest lines in Germany, opened between 1859 and 1862 by the Cologne-Minden Railway Company.

== Services ==
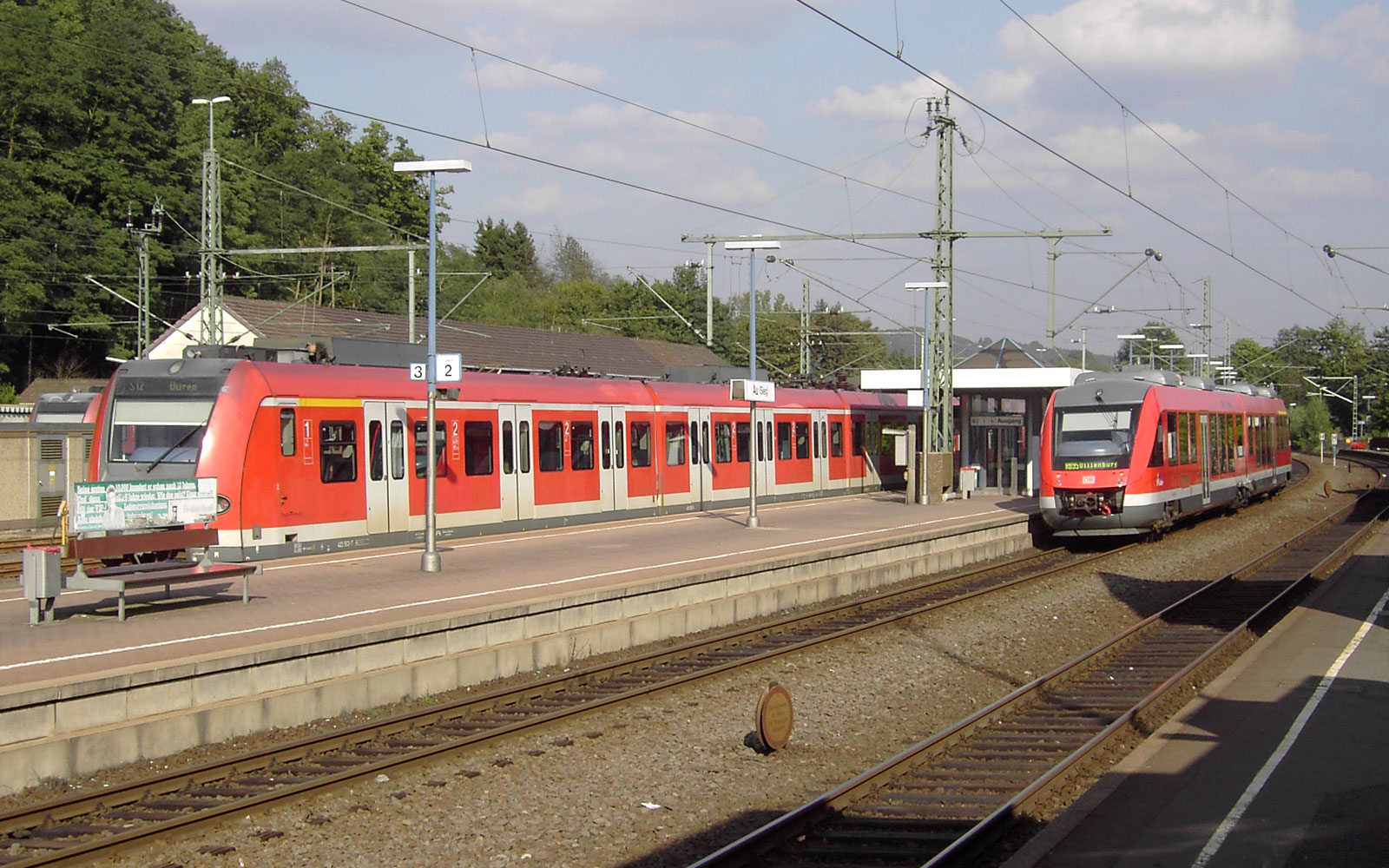
Left: S12 EMUs (DB Class 423), right: Sieg-Dill Bahn DMUs (DB Class 648) in Au.

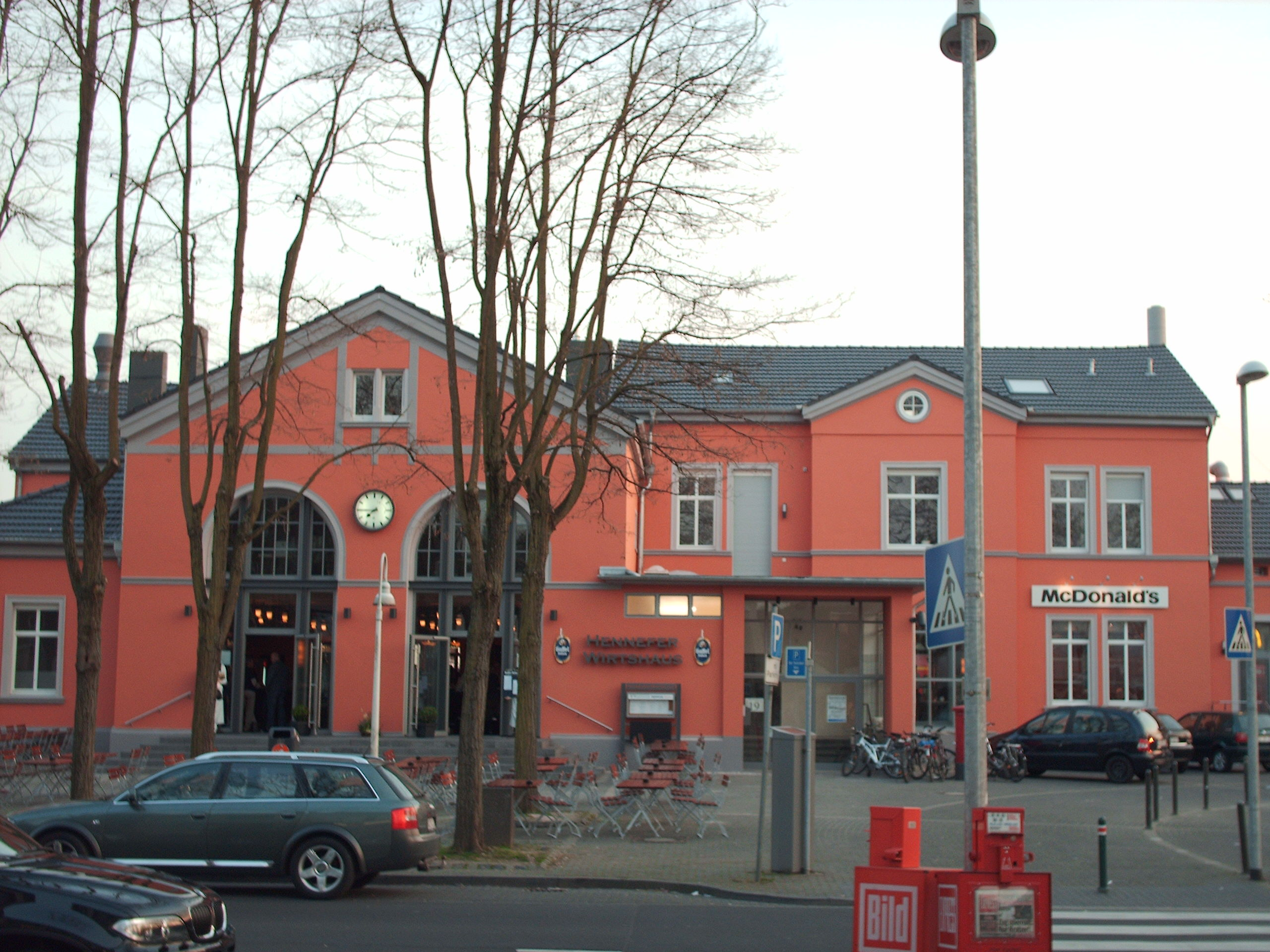
Hennef station

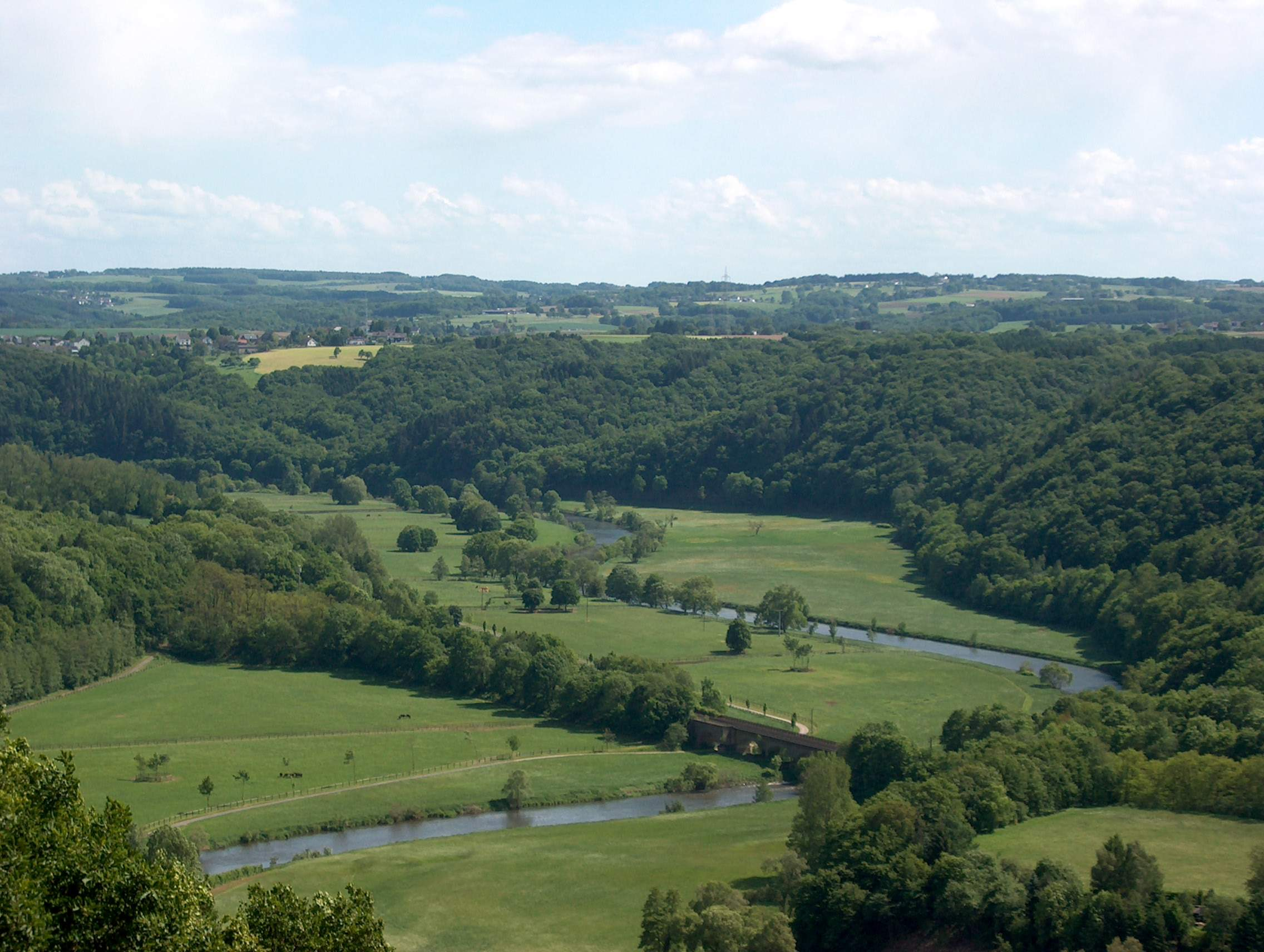
Sieg valley between Eitorf-Merten and Hennef-Bülgenauel

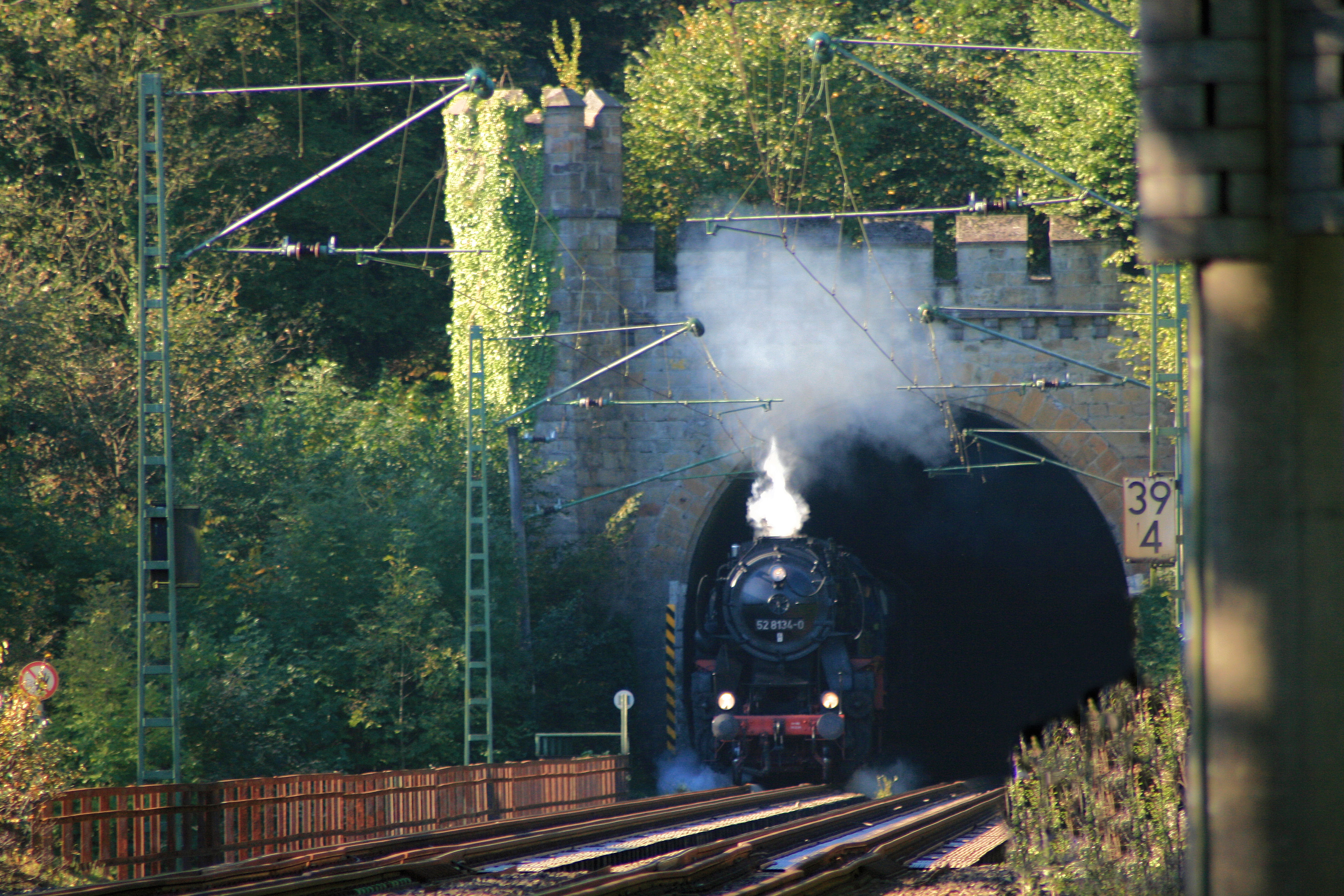
The east portal of the Merten Tunnels

Services of the line are:

- Rhein-Sieg-Express (RE 9) of DB Regio (Aachen – Köln – Siegen), operated hourly with Bombardier Talent 2 EMUs in coupled sets, or with double-decker push-pull sets propelled by class 111 or class 120 electric locomotives or occasionally Silberling coaches hauled by class 111 locomotives.
- Westerwald-Sieg-Bahn (RB 90) of the Hessische Landesbahn as Dreiländerbahn (Limburg – Westerburg – Altenkirchen – Au (Sieg) – Betzdorf – Siegen), runs every hour after the S 12, and every half hour in the peak hour on the Altenkirchen - Betzdorf section. The trains consist of diesel railcars of class 640 or 648 for speeds up to 120 kilometres per hour (75 mph).
- Rothaarbahn (RB 93) of the Hessische Landesbahn as Dreiländerbahn (Betzdorf – Siegen – Kreuztal – Bad Berleburg), runs every hour after the RE 9, forms together with RB 90 a half-hour service on the Betzdorf – Siegen section. The trains consist of diesel railcars of class 640 or 648 for speeds up to 120 kilometres per hour (75 mph).
- Rhine-Ruhr S-Bahn S12 ((Horrem -) Köln-Ehrenfeld – Köln – Köln-Porz – Troisdorf – Hennef (Sieg) – Au (Sieg)), to Hennef at 20-minute intervals and hourly to Au. Forms together with S 19 a half-hour service on the Hennef – Herchen (– Au) section. Operated with coupled sets of DB Class 420 and DBAG Class 423 EMUs.
- Rhine-Ruhr S-Bahn S13 (Düren – Sindorf – Köln-Ehrenfeld – Köln – Köln-Bonn Flughafen – Troisdorf). Operated with coupled sets of DBAG Class 423 EMUs.
- Rhine-Ruhr S-Bahn S19 (Düren – Sindorf – Köln-Ehrenfeld - Köln – Köln-Bonn Flughafen – Troisdorf – Siegburg – Hennef (Sieg) – Herchen). Individual services from Monday to Friday at lunch and dinner as well as daily services at night to Au (Sieg). Operated with coupled sets of DBAG Class 423 EMUs.

== Fare-/ transport associations ==
The Sieg railway is located in the fare area of Rheinland-Tarif (former Verkehrsverbund Rhein-Sieg fare between Cologne and Au (Sieg), between Etzbach and Niederschelden in the area of the transport association Verkehrsverbund Rhein-Mosel (VRM), between Niederschelden Nord and Siegen Hbf in the area of the fare association Westfalen-Tarif.

== History ==
=== Formation ===
The Sieg railway is the western section of the Deutz–Gießen railway (Deutz-Gießener Eisenbahn, DGE) as far as Betzdorf and the line from there to Siegen, which was originally opened as a branch line on 10 January 1861.

From the time of the building of a line, a direct connection was proposed between Siegen and Haiger, which was eventually opened in 1915. This shortened the connection between Siegen and Dillenburg by about 30 kilometres (20 mi), leading to a shift of traffic from the old line (now known as the Heller Valley Railway), which subsequently usually ran via Siegen and Haiger.

=== Further development ===
The Sieg flood of 1909 destroyed many bridges, including railway bridges, such as at Herchen, which had to be rebuilt. In 1914, numerous special trains were used to carry German troops to their deployment area in the Eifel during the First World War. In 1945, in the last days of World War II many bridges over the Sieg were destroyed by the retreating German Army. Many of these bridges were rebuilt with single-track only. In 1991, the second track was restored on the Troisdorf–Siegburg section for S-Bahn operations. There are still single-track sections between Blankenberg and Merten (3 km (2 mi)) and between Schladern and Rosbach (2 km (1 mi)). On 18 February 1956, there was a serious train accident near the town of Bülgenauel. Two people were killed and 15 injured in a collision of a freight train and an express passenger train, caused by human error.

In 1962 was the first section of the Sieg line from Cologne to Troisdorf was electrified, together with the Right Rhine line. The rest of the Sieg line was electrified in 1980. The once extensive freight traffic on the line has declined sharply. Deutsche Bundesbahn closed long-distance passenger traffic in the 1980s. Steam operations in the Sieg valley ended in 1976 and was not allowed again until 1987. In 1990/1991 test runs with the Intercity-Express (ICE) trains were carried out in the Sieg valley. Since not enough funds were available for ICE carriages, some central carriages were ordinary express carriages. One of the routes considered for the proposed Cologne–Frankfurt high-speed rail line would have involved the rebuilding of the Sieg line to Eitorf for four tracks. The line would have continued through the Leuscheid region via Altenkirchen and Westerburg to Frankfurt. Many kinds of train ran in the Sieg valley during the rebuilding of the Sieg line for the S-Bahn in 1991.

In the summer and autumn of 2003 the Connex company operated for a short time a long-distance InterConnex service on the Sieg line from Cologne via Siegen, Marburg, Kassel, Berlin to Rostock. The line opened on 6 June 2003 and closed on 27 October of that year because Connex needed the rollingstock for the Hamburg–Flensburg route.

In the spring of 2004, the whole Cologne–Au section was equipped with new high platforms for the extension of S-Bahn line 12 from Cologne to Düren with class 423 rail cars. Until then S 12 services were operated by class 143 locomotives hauling converted Silberling carriages. Porz, Troisdorf, Hennef and Blankenberg stations were equipped with only temporary platforms. The last station to be equipped with high platform was Porz in 2009.

Construction of a new station for S-Bahn line 12 at Hennef im Siegbogen began in January 2011 and it opened on 11 December 2011. It is intended to upgrade the track and stations between Au and Siegen, including the installations of high platforms.
