= List of Intercity-Express lines in Germany =

Frequency of trains and allowed max speed on the German Intercity-Express (ICE) network (2026)

This list of Intercity-Express lines in Germany includes all Intercity-Express lines in Germany. The latest changes to the Intercity Express network took place at the timetable change on 14 December 2025. The network currently has 35 scheduled lines.

== Legend ==
Line
The official line name given by DB Fernverkehr for each line. Some lines, which have many branches, are divided into individual sections, which may deviate from the basic line.

Route
The route represents all stops on a route. Stops served only by a few trains during the day, but are passed through or bypassed several times a day, are shown in italics.

Stock
This column indicates which type of ICE train usually runs on this line.

== Lines overview ==
Line	Direction between
ICE 1	(Hamburg, Cologne and Passau)
ICE 3	(Saarbrücken, Frankfurt and Berlin)
ICE 4	(Flensburg, Hamburg and Frankfurt)
ICE 6	(Berlin, Nuremberg and Stuttgart)
ICE 9	(Berlin, Cologne and Bonn)
ICE 10	Berlin, Hanover and Cologne
ICE 11	Berlin, Frankfurt and Munich
ICE 12	Berlin, Kassel and Switzerland
ICE 13	Berlin, Kassel and Frankfurt
ICE 14	Berlin, Essen and Aachen
ICE 15	Frankfurt, Berlin and Binz
ICE 16	Bremen, Hanover and Berlin
ICE 18	Hamburg, Berlin and Munich
ICE 19	Berlin, Cologne and Stuttgart
ICE/ECE 20	Hamburg, Kassel and Basel
ICE 22	Kiel, Hamburg and Stuttgart
ICE 23	Hamburg and Berlin
ICE 24	Hamburg, Munich and Alps
ICE 25	Hamburg, Nuremberg and Munich
ICE 26	Bremen and Karlsruhe
RJ 27	(Copenhagen, Kiel) Hamburg, Berlin, Prague (Budapest and Vienna)
ICE 27	Westerland and Berlin
ICE 28	Hamburg, Berlin and Munich
ICE 29	Berlin and Munich
ICE 33	Hamburg and Ostseebad Binz
ICE 41	Essen, Nuremberg and Munich
ICE 42	Hamburg, Dortmund, Mannheim and Munich
ICE 43	Hamburg, Cologne and Basel
ICE 45	(Cologne, Wiesbaden and Mainz)
ICE 47	(Dortmund and Stuttgart)
ICE 49	(Cologne and Frankfurt)
ICE 50	Dresden, Frankfurt and Wiesbaden
ICE 55	Dresden, Cologne and Stuttgart
ICE 60	Karlsruhe, Stuttgart and Munich
ICE 62	Munich, Salzburg, Klagenfurt and Graz
ECE 75	Hamburg and Copenhagen
ICE 77	Amsterdam and Berlin
ICE 78	Amsterdam, Cologne and Frankfurt
ICE 79	Brussels, Cologne and Frankfurt
ICE/TGV 82	(Paris, Mannheim and Frankfurt)
ICE/TGV 83	Paris, Strasbourg and Stuttgart
ICE/TGV 84	Frankfurt, Strasbourg and Marseille
ECE 85	Frankfurt, Basel and Milan
ECE 88	Munich and Zurich
ICE 89	Munich and Landeck-Zams
ICE/RJX 90	(Munich, Salzburg and Vienna)
ICE 91	(Dortmund), Frankfurt and Vienna
	(...) = only few trains daily

== 1–9 ==
Lines 1, 3, 4, 6 and 9 are all Sprinter lines, which means they have fewer stops.

=== 1 ===
Line 1 was introduced in December 2025 and is the former Sprinter line 39. It runs three times a day as a Sprinter between Hamburg and Cologne and two times a day it continues as a normal ICE to Nuremberg and once to Passau. Only one ICE in the direction of Nuremberg stops at Bingen.

Line	Route	Stock
ICE 1	Hamburg-Altona – Hamburg – Essen – Duisburg – Düsseldorf – Cologne – Bonn – Koblenz – Bingen am Rhein – Mainz – Frankfurt Airport – Frankfurt – Hanau – Aschaffenburg – Würzburg – Nuremberg – Regensburg – Plattling – Passau	

=== 3 ===
Line 3 is the former line 16. It has the character of a Sprinter line and connects Berlin and Frankfurt am Main via the Hanover freight bypass line. Three trains run daily in each direction. One pair of trains extends to Saarbrücken, the other two trains end in Frankfurt Airport regional station

Line	Route		Stock
ICE 3	Berlin Südkreuz – Berlin – Berlin-Spandau – Frankfurt –	Frankfurt Airport regional	ICE 1
ICE 3	Berlin Südkreuz – Berlin – Berlin-Spandau – Frankfurt –	Mannheim – Neustadt – Kaiserslautern – Homburg – Saarbrücken	ICE 1

=== 4 ===
Line 4 runs as a Sprinter line between Hamburg and Frankfurt Airport. In December 2025 the service was expanded to four times a day, with one train extending to Flensburg and during the Summer further to Padborg.

Line	Route		Stock
ICE 4	Padborg – Flensburg – Schleswig – Neumünster –	Hamburg – Hannover – Frankfurt – Frankfurt Airport regional	ICE 1, ICE 4
ICE 4	Hamburg-Altona –Hamburg Dammtor –	Hamburg – Hannover – Frankfurt – Frankfurt Airport regional	ICE 1, ICE 4

=== 6 ===
Line 6 was introduced in December 2025 and runs between Berlin and Stuttgart once a day and only stops in Nuremberg. Trains start in Berlin Gesundbrunnen.

Line	Route	Stock
ICE 6	Berlin Gesundbrunnen – Berlin – Berlin Südkreuz – Nuremberg – Stuttgart	ICE 3

=== 9 ===
Line 9 runs between Berlin and Bonn and only stops in Cologne. It runs three times a day and starts either at Berlin Südkreuz or Ostbahnhof.

Line	Route		Stock
ICE 9	Berlin Ostbahnhof –	Berlin – Berlin Zoologischer Garten – Berlin-Spandau – Cologne – Bonn	ICE 4
ICE 9	Berlin Südkreuz	Berlin – Berlin Zoologischer Garten – Berlin-Spandau – Cologne – Bonn	ICE 4

== 10–17, 19 ==
The lines start in Berlin. Lines 10, 14, 16 and 19 start at Berlin Ostbahnhof or Südkreuz and run to Hanover. Lines 12 and 13 operate from Berlin Ostbahnhof via Brunswick to Frankfurt, while lines 11 and 15 run from the low level of Berlin Hauptbahnhof via Erfurt to Frankfurt. Some trains may start or end in Berlin-Gesundbrunnen (11 and 15) or Binz (15).

=== 10 ===
Line 10 runs hourly between Berlin and Cologne. Every second train is divided or combined in Hamm depending on their travel direction. A part of the trains run via Essen and Düsseldorf to Cologne. The other trains runs via the Bergisches Land to Cologne. Since December 2023, ICE 19 runs every two hours via the Bergisches Land, providing an hourly service in combination with the line 10 portion.

Line	Route			Stock
ICE 10	Berlin Ostbahnhof – Berlin – Berlin Zoologischer Garten – Berlin-Spandau – Stendal – Wolfsburg – Braunschweig – Hanover – Minden – Herford – Bielefeld – Gütersloh – Hamm –	Dortmund – Bochum – Essen – Duisburg – Düsseldorf Airport – Düsseldorf –	Cologne	ICE 2, 7-car ICE 4
ICE 10	Berlin Ostbahnhof – Berlin – Berlin Zoologischer Garten – Berlin-Spandau – Stendal – Wolfsburg – Braunschweig – Hanover – Minden – Herford – Bielefeld – Gütersloh – Hamm –	Hagen – Wuppertal – Solingen –	Cologne	ICE 2, 7-car ICE 4

The 1540/1541 train pair operates in the early morning on a different route between Hanover and Berlin, running via Potsdam, Magdeburg and Braunschweig instead of Wolfsburg.

Route
Berlin Ostbahnhof – Berlin – Berlin Zoologischer Garten – Berlin-Wannsee – Potsdam – Brandenburg – Magdeburg – Braunschweig – Hanover – Minden – Bielefeld – Gütersloh – Hamm – Dortmund – Bochum – Essen – Duisburg – Düsseldorf Airport – Düsseldorf – Cologne

=== 11 ===
Line 11 runs every two hours between Berlin-Gesundbrunnen and Frankfurt and Munich, using the Erfurt–Leipzig/Halle high-speed railway between Leipzig and Erfurt and the Mannheim–Stuttgart high-speed railway between Mannheim and Stuttgart. Since December 2022, the line has run via the Wendlingen–Ulm high-speed railway.

Line	Route	Stock
ICE 11	Berlin Gesundbrunnen – Berlin – Berlin Südkreuz – Wittenberg – Leipzig – Erfurt – Eisenach – Fulda – Frankfurt – Mannheim – Stuttgart – Ulm – Augsburg – Munich-Pasing – Munich	ICE 4

The 698/699 train pair operates during the night and stops and some extra stations like Bitterfeld, Halle, Frankfurt Airport, Heidelberg and Günzburg.

Route
Berlin Gesundbrunnen – Berlin – Berlin Südkreuz – Wittenberg – Bitterfeld – Leipzig – Halle – Erfurt – Eisenach – Frankfurt – Frankfurt Airport – Mannheim – Heidelberg – Stuttgart – Ulm – Günzburg – Augsburg – Munich-Pasing – Munich

Furthermore, ICE 991 runs at 5:40 am from Wiesbaden via Mainz, Mannheim and Stuttgart to Munich.

Route
Wiesbaden – Mainz – Worms – Mannheim – Stuttgart – Ulm – Augsburg – Munich-Pasing – Munich

=== 12 ===
Services on the line run every two hours from Berlin via Brunswick, Kassel, Frankfurt and Mannheim to Basel and further into Switzerland. From Karlsruhe, it runs on parts of the unfinished Karlsruhe–Basel high-speed railway. Some trains continue to Zürich, Chur, Interlaken or Brig.

Line 12 overlaps with line 13 every hour between Berlin and Fulda, and line 43 between Mannheim and Basel.

Line	Route			Stock
ICE 12	Berlin Ostbahnhof – Berlin – Berlin Zoologischer Garten – Berlin-Spandau – Wolfsburg – Braunschweig – Hildesheim – Göttingen – Kassel-Wilhelmshöhe – Fulda – Hanau – Frankfurt – Mannheim – Karlsruhe – Baden-Baden – Offenburg – Freiburg – Basel Bad – Basel SBB –	Liestal – Olten – Bern – Thun – Spiez –	Interlaken West – Interlaken East	ICE 4
ICE 12	Berlin Ostbahnhof – Berlin – Berlin Zoologischer Garten – Berlin-Spandau – Wolfsburg – Braunschweig – Hildesheim – Göttingen – Kassel-Wilhelmshöhe – Fulda – Hanau – Frankfurt – Mannheim – Karlsruhe – Baden-Baden – Offenburg – Freiburg – Basel Bad – Basel SBB –	Liestal – Olten – Bern – Thun – Spiez –	Visp – Brig	ICE 4
ICE 12	Berlin Ostbahnhof – Berlin – Berlin Zoologischer Garten – Berlin-Spandau – Wolfsburg – Braunschweig – Hildesheim – Göttingen – Kassel-Wilhelmshöhe – Fulda – Hanau – Frankfurt – Mannheim – Karlsruhe – Baden-Baden – Offenburg – Freiburg – Basel Bad – Basel SBB –	Zürich – Sargans – Landquart – Chur		ICE 4

Train pair 273/1272 operates during the night from Frankfurt to Berlin and from Berlin to Zürich via Hanover instead of Brunswick.

Route
Berlin Ostbahnhof – Berlin – Berlin Zoologischer Garten – Berlin-Spandau – Stendal – Woflsburg – Hanover – Göttingen – Fulda – Hanau – Frankfurt South – Frankfurt Airport – Frankfurt – Mannheim – Karslruhe – Offenburg – Freiburg – Basel Bad – Basel SBB – Zürich

=== 13 ===
This line was introduced at the timetable change in December 2017. It connects Berlin and Frankfurt south via Brunswick. It replaced line 11, which now runs via Erfurt instead of Brunswick. The trains run every 2 hours. Three trains end in Frankfurt Airport, while three continue to Karlsruhe via Darmstadt and one train to Stuttgart.

Line	Route			Stock
ICE 13	Berlin Ostbahnhof – Berlin – Berlin Zoologischer Garten – Berlin-Spandau – Stendal – Wolfsburg – Brunswick – Hildesheim – Göttingen – Kassel-Wilhelmshöhe – Fulda – Hanau – Frankfurt South	– Frankfurt Airport		ICE 1, ICE T
ICE 13	Berlin Ostbahnhof – Berlin – Berlin Zoologischer Garten – Berlin-Spandau – Stendal – Wolfsburg – Brunswick – Hildesheim – Göttingen – Kassel-Wilhelmshöhe – Fulda – Hanau – Frankfurt South	– Darmstadt – Bensheim – Weinheim – Heidelberg – Wiesloch-Walldorf	– Bruchsal – Karlsruhe	ICE 1, ICE T
ICE 13	Berlin Ostbahnhof – Berlin – Berlin Zoologischer Garten – Berlin-Spandau – Stendal – Wolfsburg – Brunswick – Hildesheim – Göttingen – Kassel-Wilhelmshöhe – Fulda – Hanau – Frankfurt South	– Darmstadt – Bensheim – Weinheim – Heidelberg – Wiesloch-Walldorf	– Stuttgart	ICE 1, ICE T
ICE 13	Berlin Ostbahnhof – Berlin – Berlin Zoologischer Garten – Berlin-Spandau – Stendal – Wolfsburg – Brunswick – Hildesheim – Göttingen – Kassel-Wilhelmshöhe – Fulda – Hanau – Frankfurt South	→ Frankfurt		ICE 1, ICE T

=== 14 ===
Since 2007, ICE line 14 has been running additional services between Berlin and Essen. The first IC trains from Berlin to Herzogenrath were already operated in 2009 as IC 2222/2223 and extended to Aachen in 2014. Individual trains also went to Stralsund (IC1944) or Cologne (IC1945). The train pair ICE 1545/1548 was operated with ICE vehicles for the first time in December 2020 and runs daily between Berlin and Aachen. Since December 2020, the additional trips to Stralsund and Cologne have been eliminated.

Line	Route					Stock
ICE 14	Berlin Ostbahnhof – Berlin – Berlin Zoologischer Garten – Berlin-Spandau – Wolfsburg – Hanover –	Osnabrück – Münster – Wanne-Eickel – Recklinghausen –	Essen – Duisburg –	Düsseldorf – Cologne – Düren –	Aachen	ICE 1, ICE 2, ICE 4, ICE T
ICE 14	Berlin Ostbahnhof – Berlin – Berlin Zoologischer Garten – Berlin-Spandau – Wolfsburg – Hanover –	Herford – Bielefeld – Gütersloh – Hamm – Dortmund – Bochum –	Essen – Duisburg –	Krefeld – Viersen – Mönchengladbach – Rheydt – Erkelenz – Geilenkirchen – Herzogenrath –	Aachen	ICE 1, ICE 2, ICE 4, ICE T

=== 15 ===
Line 15 is an ICE line connecting Stralsund and Frankfurt every two hours. It was introduced in December 2015. Four pairs of trains (six pairs on Fridays and Sundays) connect Berlin with Frankfurt in less than 4 hours, making the connection around 15 minutes faster than the one via Braunschweig. The service on the entire section between Berlin and Frankfurt was increased to two-hour intervals with the timetable change in December 2017. The line continues five times a day from Berlin to Stralsund and Binz and twice a day it continues from Frankfurt to Darmstad and Mannheim and Saarbrücken.

Already in the annual timetable 2003/2004 there was an ICE line 15 as a successor to the Interregio line 15, but with a route via Potsdam, Dessau and Naumburg and Weimar. In the timetables 2004/2005 and 2005/2006 there were three train pairs of the ICE line 15 Frankfurt-Erfurt-Halle-Berlin together with the ICE line 51 Dortmund-Paderborn-Kassel-Erfurt-Leipzig-Dresden as a line exchanger in time with the ICE Line 50 Frankfurt-Erfurt-Leipzig-Dresden.

Line	Route	Stock
ICE 15	Binz – Bergen auf Rügen – Stralsund – Greifswald – Züssow – Anklam – Pasewalk – Prenzlau – Eberswalde – Berlin Gesundbrunnen – Berlin – Berlin Südkreuz – Halle – Erfurt – Frankfurt – Darmstadt – Bensheim – Mannheim – Neustadt – Kaiserslautern – Homburg – Saarbrücken	ICE 1

=== 16 ===
In December 2025, line 16 became a new line between Berlin and Bremen via Hanover with one train extending to Oldenburg

Line	Route	Stock
ICE 16	Berlin Südkreuz – Berlin – Berlin-Spandau – Hanover – Bremen – Delmenhorst – Oldenburg	

=== 19 ===
Line 19 was introduced for the 2024 annual timetable and connects Berlin with Cologne and Bonn every 2 hours via Hagen and Wupptertal; one trip is extended south to Koblenz. In contrast to ICE 10, line 19 does not stop in Wolfsburg and Hamm. Lines 10 and 19 together form an approximate hourly service between Cologne and Berlin via Wuppertal and Hagen.

Line	Route	Stock
ICE 19	Berlin Ostbahnhof – Berlin Hbf – Berlin Zoologischer Garten – Berlin-Spandau – Hanover – Bielefeld – Hagen – Wuppertal – Cologne – Bonn – Remagen – Andernach – Koblenz	ICE 1, ICE 4

In the evening ICE 550 runs via Dortmund and Düsseldorf instead of Hagen and Wuppertal.

Route
Berlin Südkreuz → Berlin → Berlin-Spandau → Hanover → Minden → Bad Oeynhausen → Herford → Bielefeld → Gütersloh → Hamm → Dortmund → Bochum → Essen → Duisburg → Düsseldorf → Cologne

== 18, 20, 22–29 ==
The primary route segments of lines 18, 20, 22, 23, 24, 25, 26, 27 and 28 all begin in Hamburg. Some services continue to Kiel or Oldenburg.

Lines 18, 23 and 28 go to or via Berlin, while lines 20, 22, 24, 25 and 26 go via Hanover. Lines 20 and 22 pass through several stations in larger cities without stopping.

=== 18 ===
Line 18 was re-introduced with the opening of the Nuremberg–Erfurt high-speed railway. The trains start in Hamburg-Altona. Line 18 runs exclusively via Halle. With the redesign of the ICE lines between Berlin and Munich for the timetable year 2026, the line received a new route and also stops in Büchen, Ludwigslust and Wittenberge.

In the 2026 timetable year, Coburg is served by one southbound train (ICE 805) and one northbound train (ICE 700). The trains reverse direction in Nuremberg and travel via Augsburg, with further stops in Donauwörth and Munich-Pasing, before reaching Munich Central Station. Treuchtlingen will only be served by one northbound train (ICE 700) on this line.

The line operates every two hours, with two gaps in service between Hamburg and Berlin, which are filled by the two Berlin-Vienna ICE train pairs that travel via Leipzig. Together with lines 28 and 29, it provides a 30-minute service between Erfurt and Nuremberg. Due to the line's detour via Augsburg, this 30-minute service to Munich requires a transfer in Nuremberg. Between Berlin and Erfurt, it combines with lines 15 and 29 to create an approximate 30-minute service. Between Hamburg and Berlin, it combines with line 23 to provide hourly service, and with lines 27 and 28 to create an approximate 30-minute service.

Line	Route	Stock
ICE 18	Hamburg-Altona – Hamburg – Büchen – Ludwigslust – Wittenberge – Berlin – Berlin Südkreuz – Wittenberg – Bitterfeld – Halle – Erfurt – Coburg – Bamberg – Nuremberg – Donauwörth – Augsburg – Munich-Pasing – Munich	ICE 1

One train pair (904/905) runs overnight by a route that avoids high-speed lines.

Route	Stock
Berlin Gesundbrunnen – Berlin – Berlin Südkreuz – Wittenberg – Bitterfeld – Leipzig – Naumburg – Jena Paradies – Jena-Göschwitz – Saalfeld – Lichtenfels – Bamberg – Erlangen – Treuchtlingen – Nuremberg – Donauwörth – Augsburg – Munich-Pasing – Munich	ICE 1

Since the 2024 annual timetable, an IC set has been running between Westerland and Berlin as part of line 29. From 1 May 2026, this line is to be served by an ICE L set each day (2074/75).

Route	Stock
Westerland – Niebüll – Husum – Heide – Itzehoe – Hamburg – Berlin – Berlin Südkreuz	ICE L

=== 20 ===
Line 20 connects Hamburg every two hours with Basel. Between Hamburg and Frankfurt, it overlaps with line 22 to produce an hourly frequency. One ICE service per day runs from Hamburg to Wiesbaden (ICE 79) and back (ICE 78). Since the 2025 timetable change, one pair has been operated using SBB RABe 501 "Giruno" sets each day.

Line	Route		Stock
ICE/ECE 20	Hamburg – Uelzen – Hanover – Göttingen – Kassel-Wilhelmshöhe – Frankfurt –	Mannheim – Karlsruhe – Baden-Baden – Offenburg – Freiburg – Basel Bad – Basel SBB	ICE 4, SBB RABe 501
ICE/ECE 20	Hamburg – Uelzen – Hanover – Göttingen – Kassel-Wilhelmshöhe – Frankfurt –	Frankfurt Airport – Mainz – Wiesbaden	ICE 4, SBB RABe 501

=== 22 ===
Line 22 connects Hamburg with Stuttgart every two hours. Five train pairs connect to/from Kiel. Between Hamburg and Frankfurt (Main) it overlaps with line 20 to produce an hourly frequency.

Line	Route	Stock
ICE 22	Kiel – Neumünster – Hamburg – Celle – Hannover – Göttingen – Kassel-Wilhelmshöhe – Hanau – Frankfurt – Mannheim – Heidelberg – Vaihingen – Stuttgart	ICE 1, ICE 4

=== 23 ===
Line 23 was introduced in December 2025 and is a short line between Hamburg and Berlin. The trains stop alternately at Wittenberge and Ludwigslust. One train pair also stops in Büchen and Hamburg-Bergedorf.

Line	Route	Stock
ICE 23	Hamburg-Altona – Hamburg – Hamburg-Bergedorf – Büchen – Ludwigslust – Wittenberge – Berlin-Spandau – Berlin – Berlin Südkreuz	

=== 24 ===
Line 24 was separated from line 26 for the 2021 timetable year and comprises several trains that run between Hamburg and Kassel one hour later than the two-hourly line 26, serving additional destinations. These include (weekend) supplementary services between Hamburg and Munich or Austria.

Line	Route		Stock
ICE 24
ICE 24	Hamburg-Altona – Hamburg Dammtor – Hamburg – Hamburg-Harburg – Lüneburg – Hanover – Göttingen – Kassel – Fulda – Würzburg – Ansbach – Treuchtlingen – Donauwörth – Augsburg – Munich-Pasing – Munich – Munich East – Rosenheim – Kufstein – Wörgl –	Hopfgarten im Brixental – Kirchberg in Tirol – Kitzbühel Hahnenkamm – Kitzbüihel – St. Johann in Tirol – Fieberbrunn – Hochfilzen – Saalfelden – Maishofen-Saalbach – Zell am See – Schwarzach-St. Veit	ICE 1, ICE T
ICE 24	Hamburg-Altona – Hamburg Dammtor – Hamburg – Hamburg-Harburg – Lüneburg – Hanover – Göttingen – Kassel – Fulda – Würzburg – Ansbach – Treuchtlingen – Donauwörth – Augsburg – Munich-Pasing – Munich – Munich East – Rosenheim – Kufstein – Wörgl –	Jenbach – Innsbruck	ICE 1, ICE T

From 2 May 2026, one train pair will start or end in Westerland (Sylt) and, from Kassel, will run via the Main-Weser Railway, stopping in Gießen and terminating at Frankfurt. This train service was previously operated as an Intercity (IC) service and was part of line 26 until December 2025.

Route	Stock
Westerland (Sylt) – Niebüll – Husum – Heide (Holst) – Itzehoe – Hamburg – Hamburg-Harburg – Lüneburg – Hanover – Göttingen – Kassel-Wilhelmshöhe – Wabern – Treysa – Marburg – Gießen – Frankfurt	ICE L

=== 25 ===
Services on the line run hourly from Hamburg to Munich. Since 2019, the line has operated exclusively on the Nuremberg–Ingolstadt high-speed railway. Until 2026, every two hours, a train portion began either in Bremen or Oldenburg, which was coupled in Hannover with another train portion coming from Hamburg, Kiel or Lübeck. It was discontinued for the 2026 timetable to make the timetable more reliable. Since then, only ICE 4 trains have operated on line 25. Some trains to and from Bremen stopped in Verden and Nienburg, and some trains were extended via Delmenhorst to Oldenburg. The daily service to Lübeck was also discontinued but one train a day continues to Rostock with the timetable change. Furthermore, Lüneburg station is now served hourly.

Line	Route		Stock
ICE 25	Hamburg Dammtor →	Hamburg – Hamburg-Harburg – Lüneburg – Hanover – Göttingen – Kassel – Fulda – Würzburg – Nuremberg – Ingolstadt – Munich	ICE 4
ICE 25	Rostock – Schwerin – Büchen –	Hamburg – Hamburg-Harburg – Lüneburg – Hanover – Göttingen – Kassel – Fulda – Würzburg – Nuremberg – Ingolstadt – Munich	ICE 4

=== 26 ===
ICE line 26 runs every four hours between Bremen and Karlsruhe (once daily as ICE 1573 from Oldenburg). Between Kassel and Frankfurt, it does not use the Hannover–Würzburg high-speed line, but instead takes a longer route via the Main-Weser Railway, stopping in Wabern, Treysa, Marburg and Gießen.

Until 2025, line 26 ran every two hours between Karlsruhe and Hamburg, some train running on to Stralsund and Binz, stopping at some stations not served by most ICE lines, for example Lüneburg, Uelzen and Celle.

Line	Route	Stock
ICE 26	Oldenburg – Delmenhorst – Bremen – Hanover – Göttingen – Kassel-Wilhelmshöhe – Wabern – Treysa – Marburg – Gießen – Frankfurt – Darmstadt – Bensheim – Weinheim – Heidelberg – Wiesloch-Walldorf – Bruchsal – Karlsruhe	ICE 1, ICE T

=== 27 ===
Line 27 connects Hamburg and Prague every two hours using České dráhy ComfortJet sets. One train pair starts or finishes Budapest and another in Vienna. Five train sets start or finish in Hamburg-Altona, three in Copenhagen and one in Kiel.

Line	Route			Stock
RJ 27	Hamburg-Altona – Hamburg Dammtor –	Hamburg – Berlin-Spandau – Berlin – Berlin Südkreuz – Dresden-Neustadt – Dresden – Bad Schandau – Děčín – Ústí nad Labem – Prague (– Brno – Břeclav –)	Bratislava – Budapest Keleti	ComfortJet
RJ 27	Copenhagen – Ringsted – Odense – Kolding – Padborg – Schleswig –	Hamburg – Berlin-Spandau – Berlin – Berlin Südkreuz – Dresden-Neustadt – Dresden – Bad Schandau – Děčín – Ústí nad Labem – Prague (– Brno – Břeclav –)	Vienna	ComfortJet
RJ 27	Kiel – Neumünster –	Hamburg – Berlin-Spandau – Berlin – Berlin Südkreuz – Dresden-Neustadt – Dresden – Bad Schandau – Děčín – Ústí nad Labem – Prague (– Brno – Břeclav –)	Vienna	ComfortJet

=== 28 ===
Services on line 28 begin in Hamburg-Altona and runs via Leipzig, while the otherwise similar line 18 runs via Halle. One train pair runs to from Kiel. Only a few stops are served between Hamburg and Berlin. After crossing Berlin, trains run via Leipzig and Erfurt. In Coburg, there are three trains to the south and two trains to the north, since a stop in Coburg would cause a travel delay of about 12 minutes, making it impossible to achieve a two-hour connection with lines 18 or 28. Between Nuremberg and Munich all trains run via Ingolstadt, but only one service (running south) stops. The service runs every two hours, together with line 18 there is an hourly service between Hamburg and Nuremberg and for part of the day continuing to Munich.

Line	Route		Stock
ICE 28	Hamburg-Altona –	Hamburg Dammtor – Hamburg – Büchen – Ludwigslust – Wittenberge – Berlin-Spandau –Berlin – Berlin Südkreuz – Lutherstadt Wittenberg – Leipzig – Erfurt – Coburg – Bamberg – Erlangen – Nuremberg – Ingolstadt – Munich	ICE 4 ICE 1
ICE 28	Kiel – Neumünster –	Hamburg Dammtor – Hamburg – Büchen – Ludwigslust – Wittenberge – Berlin-Spandau –Berlin – Berlin Südkreuz – Lutherstadt Wittenberg – Leipzig – Erfurt – Coburg – Bamberg – Erlangen – Nuremberg – Ingolstadt – Munich	ICE 4 ICE 1

== 29 ==
Line 29 was re-launched in December 2017. It connects Berlin and Munich. Until 2018, three pairs of trains daily connected Berlin with Munich in under 4 hours. The line runs between Halle and Erfurt via the new Erfurt–Leipzig/Halle high-speed railway and between Erfurt and Nuremberg via the Nuremberg–Erfurt high-speed railway. With the timetable change in December 2018, services were increased to 5 Sprinter train pairs, resulting in an approximately two-hourly service. The line was extended to Hamburg in December 2021. Since 14 December 2025, the line has operated hourly, no longer runs to Hamburg, and now stops in Ingolstadt every two hours. All trains now stop in Halle and Erfurt again. This means there are now 16 pairs of Sprinter trains running daily between Berlin and Munich, with a journey time of only about 4 hours.

Line	Route	Stock
ICE 29	Berlin – Berlin Südkreuz – Halle – Erfurt – Nuremberg – Ingolstadt – Munich	ICE 3

== 33 ==
Line 33 was introduced in December 2025, running every two hours between Hamburg and Ostseebad Binz.

Line	Route		Stock
ICE 33	Hamburg-Altona – Hamburg – Schwerin – Bützow – Rostock – Ribnitz-Damgarten West – Velgast – Stralsund –	Bergen auf Rügen – Ostseebad Binz	ICE T
ICE 33	Hamburg-Altona – Hamburg – Schwerin – Bützow – Rostock – Ribnitz-Damgarten West – Velgast – Stralsund –	Greifswald	ICE T

The IC trains formerly part of line 30 between Cologne and Westerland operated as line 39 from 2023 to 2026. From 1 May 2026, this line is to be served by ICE L sets as part of ICE 33. It is operated once or twice a day.

Route	Stock
Westerland – Niebüll – Husum – Heide – Itzehoe – Hamburg – Bremen – Osnabrück – Münster – Recklinghausen – Gelsenkirchen – Essen – Duisburg – Düsseldorf – Cologne	ICE L

== 41–49 ==
Lines 41, 42, 43, 45, 47 and 49 all usually begin in Cologne, Essen or Dortmund and run on the Cologne–Frankfurt high-speed rail line:

=== 41 ===
Line 41 starts in Essen and runs hourly via Frankfurt am Main and Nuremberg to Munich. Individual trains begin or end in Dortmund. The stops at Cologne/Bonn Airport, Siegburg/Bonn, Montabaur and Limburg South are served by only a few trains. From Monday to Wednesday, the last ICE service from the Ruhr ends in Würzburg (Note: ICE 821) and continues in the morning to Essen. (Note: ICE 824)

Line	Route	Stock
ICE 41	Dortmund – Bochum – Essen – Duisburg – Düsseldorf – Köln Messe/Deutz – Cologne/Bonn Airport – Siegburg/Bonn – Montabaur – Limburg Süd – Frankfurt Airport – Frankfurt – Aschaffenburg – Würzburg – Nuremberg – Munich	ICE 3 ICE 3 Velaro D

=== 42 ===
Line 42 connects Hamburg and Munich every two hours. Together with line 43, it runs hourly between Hamburg and Dortmund, with line 55 between Dortmund and Cologne, with line 43 between Cologne and Mannheim and with line 11 between Mannheim and Munich.

Individual trains run between Dortmund and Cologne via Bochum, Essen, Duisburg and Düsseldorf instead of via Hagen, Wuppertal and Solingen.

Line	Route	Stock
ICE 42	Hamburg-Altona – Hamburg Dammtor – Hamburg – Hamburg-Harburg – Bremen – Osnabrück – Münster – Dortmund – Hagen – Wuppertal – Solingen – Cologne – Siegburg/Bonn – Frankfurt Airport – Mannheim – Stuttgart – Ulm – Augsburg – München-Pasing – Munich	ICE 4

=== 43 ===
Line 43 connects Hamburg with Basel every two hours. Since 2026, the trains have regularly stopped in Baden-Baden instead of Offenburg, swapping it with Line 20. The last train from Basel runs via Essen to Dortmund. Line 43 overlaps with line 42 every hour between Cologne and Mannheim, and with line 12 between Mannheim and Basel. Until 2025, one train pair started and ended in Binz (Baltic Sea resort) or Hanover. In its place, individual train services run to Zurich/Chur (ICE 109/105) or Brig (ICE 107). Some trains run between Dortmund and Cologne via Hagen, Wuppertal and Solingen instead of via Bochum, Essen, Duisburg and Düsseldorf.

Line	Route		Stock
ICE 43	Hamburg-Altona – Hamburg Dammtor – Hamburg – Hamburg-Harburg – Bremen – Osnabrück - Münster – Dortmund – Bochum – Essen – Duisburg – Düsseldorf – Cologne – Frankfurt Airport – Mannheim – Karlsruhe – Baden-Baden – Freiburg – Basel Bad – Basel SBB –	Zürich – Sargans – Landquart – Chur	ICE 4
ICE 43	Hamburg-Altona – Hamburg Dammtor – Hamburg – Hamburg-Harburg – Bremen – Osnabrück - Münster – Dortmund – Bochum – Essen – Duisburg – Düsseldorf – Cologne – Frankfurt Airport – Mannheim – Karlsruhe – Baden-Baden – Freiburg – Basel Bad – Basel SBB –	Liestal – Olten – Bern – Thun – Spiez – Visp – Brig	ICE 4

=== 45 ===
Line 45 starts in Cologne main station and stops at some stations of the Cologne–Frankfurt high-speed rail line. At the end of the high-speed line, it runs to the west and goes via Wiesbaden and Mainz to Stuttgart.

Line	Route	Stock
ICE 45	Cologne – Cologne/Bonn Airport – Siegburg/Bonn – Montabaur – Limburg Süd – Wiesbaden – Mainz – Mannheim – Heidelberg – Vaihingen – Stuttgart	ICE 3 ICE 3 Velaro D

From Monday to Friday, one train (ICE 712) runs from Mainz to Cologne only and one train (ICE 713) runs Cologne – Mainz – Frankfurt.

Route	Stock
Frankfurt – Frankfurt Airport – Mainz – Wiesbaden – Limburg Süd – Montabaur – Cologne	ICE 3neo

=== 47 ===
The line, which was introduced with the 2014 timetable change, connected individual services between Dortmund and Stuttgart running over the Cologne–Frankfurt and Mannheim–Stuttgart high-speed routes. Frankfurt is served only at the airport and not at the main station. In addition, the frequency has been increased to approximately once every two-hours. The line was extended to Munich over the new Wendlingen–Ulm high-speed railway from December 2022.

Line	Route	Stock
ICE 47	Dortmund – Bochum – Essen – Duisburg – Düsseldorf – Köln Messe/Deutz – Frankfurt Airport – Mannheim – Stuttgart – Ulm – Augsburg – Munich-Pasing – Munich	ICE 3, ICE 3 Velaro D, ICE 3neo

=== 49 ===
Line 49 runs between Cologne and Frankfurt (Main) and stops at all stations of the Cologne–Frankfurt high-speed rail line. Some trains do not stop at Siegburg/Bonn.

Line	Route	Stock
ICE 49	Cologne – Siegburg/Bonn – Montabaur – Limburg Süd – Frankfurt Airport – Frankfurt	ICE 3

== 50 ==
Line 50 is the only east-west ICE line in central Germany. It begins in the east in Dresden and runs via Riesa to Leipzig. After Erfurt, the line runs on the new line. In the city of Frankfurt (Main), trains stop at the Hauptbahnhof (main station) and the airport and continue to Wiesbaden via Mainz. Until the timetable change in December 2015, a train pair ran from Eisenach via Bebra, Kassel, Paderborn and Hamm to Düsseldorf.

There are services every two hours between Dresden and Wiesbaden.

Line	Route	Stock
ICE 50	Dresden – Dresden-Neustadt – Riesa – Leipzig – Erfurt – Gotha – Eisenach – Fulda – Frankfurt – Frankfurt Airport – Mainz – Wiesbaden	ICE T

During the daytime it is partly operated as follows:

Route
Frankfurt – Frankfurt Süd – Hanau – Fulda – Bad Hersfeld – Erfurt – Leipzig/Halle Airport – Leipzig

== 55 ==
This line has been steadily converted to ICE operations since 2023. Other services on the line are operated as IC 55.

Line	Route	Stock
ICE 55	Dresden – Dresden-Neustadt – Riesa – Leipzig – Leipzig/Halle Airport – Halle – Köthen – Magdeburg – Helmstedt – Braunschweig – Hanover – Minden – Bad Oeynhausen – Herford – Bielefeld – Gütersloh – Hamm – Dortmund – Hagen – Wuppertal – Solingen – Cologne – Bonn – Koblenz – Mainz – Mannheim – Heidelberg – Vaihingen (Enz) – Stuttgart	IC2

One train pair (ICE 2012/ICE 2013 Allgäu) connects Dortmund with Oberstdorf in the Allgäu region. The stops at Plochingen and Göppingen are only served when traveling towards Oberstdorf. This has been operated by ICE sets since June 2026.

Route	Stock
Dortmund – Bochum – Essen – Duisburg – Düsseldorf – Cologne – Bonn – Koblenz – Mainz – Mannheim – Heidelberg – Vaihingen – Stuttgart – Plochingen – Göppingen – Ulm – Memmingen – Kempten – Immenstadt Sonthofen – Fischen – Oberstdorf	ICE L

== 60 ==
This service has run via the Wendlingen–Ulm high-speed railway, replacing an IC service, since the timetable change in December 2022. It runs every two hours between Munich and Karlsruhe (1068/1069, 568/569, 566/567, 564/565, 560/561). One train pair runs to/from Basel SBB (266/267). Two train pairs (562/563, 1090/1091) run daily from Munich via Stuttgart to/from Saarbrücken instead of Karlsruhe. The 1090/1091 train pair is extended past Munich to/from Garmisch-Partenkirchen on Saturdays and Sundays.

Line	Route		Stock
ICE 60	(Basel SBB – Basel Bad – Freiburg – Offenburg – Baden-Baden –) Karlsruhe – Bruchsal –	Stuttgart – Ulm – Augsburg – Munich-Pasing – Munich (– Garmisch-Partenkirchen)	ICE 3
ICE 60	Saarbrücken – Homburg – Kaiserslautern – Neustadt –	Stuttgart – Ulm – Augsburg – Munich-Pasing – Munich (– Garmisch-Partenkirchen)	ICE 3neo

== 62 ==
A pair of trains on line 62 was switched to operate as Railjets (RJX) at the timetable change in December 2016. At the timetable change in December 2023, train pairs operated by DB were switched to ICE services, while the remaining train pairs operated by ÖBB continued to run as EC services. As of 2026 the line consists of two ICE train pairs per day between Frankfurt and Graz (116/117, 210/211) and one between Münster and Graz (118/119).

Line	Route		Stock
ICE 62	Frankfurt – Darmstadt – Bensheim – Weinheim – Heidelberg –	Stuttgart – Ulm – Günzburg – Augsburg – Munich – Munich East – Rosenheim – Prien – Traunstein – Freilassing – Salzburg – Golling-Abtenau – Bischofshofen – St Johann im Pongau – Schwarzach-St. Veit – Bad Gastein – Mallnitz-Obervellach – Spittal-Millstättersee – Villach – Velden – Pörtschach – Klagenfurt – Kühnsdorf-Klopeiner See – St. Paul im Lavanttal – Weststeiermark – Graz	ICE 4 (7 coach)
ICE 62	Münster – Recklinghausen – Gelsenkirchen – Essen – Duisburg – Düsseldorf – Köln Messe/Deutz – Frankfurt Airport – Mannheim – Vaihingen –	Stuttgart – Ulm – Günzburg – Augsburg – Munich – Munich East – Rosenheim – Prien – Traunstein – Freilassing – Salzburg – Golling-Abtenau – Bischofshofen – St Johann im Pongau – Schwarzach-St. Veit – Bad Gastein – Mallnitz-Obervellach – Spittal-Millstättersee – Villach – Velden – Pörtschach – Klagenfurt – Kühnsdorf-Klopeiner See – St. Paul im Lavanttal – Weststeiermark – Graz	ICE 4 (7 coach)

ÖBB operates 2 pairs of RJX sets as EC services between Munich and Salzburg and 1 pair between Munich and Vienna Airport via Graz (112/113).

Line	Route	Stock
EC/RJ 62	Munich – München Ost – Rosenheim – Prien – Traunstein – Freilassing – Salzburg (– Golling-Abtenau – Bischofshofen – St Johann im Pongau – Schwarzach-St. Veit – Bad Gastein – Mallnitz-Obervellach – Spittal-Millstättersee – Villach – Velden – Pörtschach – Klagenfurt – Bruck an der Mur – Kapfenberg – Kühnsdorf-Klopeiner See – St. Paul im Lavanttal – Weststeiermark – Graz – Bruck an der Mur – Kapfenberg – Mürzzuschlag – Wiener Neustadt – Wien Meidling – Vienna – Vienna Airport)	ÖBB-EC

ICE 218/219 (Bodensee) also runs once a day.

Route	Stock
Dortmund – Bochum – Essen – Duisburg – Düsseldorf – Köln Messe/Deutz – Frankfurt Airport – Mannheim – Heidelberg – Stuttgart – Ulm – Biberach – Ravensburg – Friedrichshafen Stadt – Lindau-Reutin – Bregenz – Dornbirn – Feldkirch – Bludenz – Langen am Arlberg – St. Anton am Arlberg – Landeck-Zams – Innsbruck	ICE 4 (7 coach)

== 75–79 ==
Lines 75, 77, 78 and 79 are international lines. They connect to Denmark and the Benelux countries:

=== 75 ===
Up to eight pairs of trains ran per day (in the summer season) on line 75 between Hamburg and Copenhagen, replacing ICE line 75 from the 2018 timetable. Until the 2019 timetable change, they ran via Puttgarden, where they were loaded onto a ferry to Rødby and then continued to Copenhagen. Due to construction work, the trains have been running across the Danish mainland since December 2019. One train pair also stops in Flensburg. As of May 2026, all trains on this route have been operated by Talgo 230 coaches, hauled by Siemens Vectron locomotives and the line has been designated as ECE 75.

Line	Route	Stock
ECE 75	Hamburg – Schleswig – Flensburg – Padborg – Kolding – Odense – Ringsted – Copenhagen	Siemens Vectron AC + Talgo 230 coaches, DSB Class MF

=== 77 ===
From September 2025, Intercity-Express trains of the ICE 3neo type were gradually introduced on the line towards Amsterdam. These will run until the newly acquired ICE L trains are ready for service. From November 2025, all services have been run exclusively as ICE trains. The first service of the day departs from Münster as an ICE 4 set.

Line	Route		Stock
ICE 77	Amsterdam – Hilversum – Amersfoort – Apeldoorn – Deventer – Hengelo – Bad Bentheim – Rheine –	Osnabrück – Bünde – Hanover – Berlin-Spandau – Berlin – Berlin Ost	ICE 3neo
ICE 77	Münster –	Osnabrück – Bünde – Hanover – Berlin-Spandau – Berlin – Berlin Ost	ICE 4, 7 cars

=== 78 ===
Line 78 connects Frankfurt am Main with Amsterdam and runs over the Cologne–Frankfurt high-speed railway. Arnhem is the first stop beyond the Dutch border. Services on the line run every two hours and stops twice a day in Siegburg/Bonn. Once a day the train runs between Munich and Amsterdam, this train runs over the Mannheim–Stuttgart and the Wendlingen–Ulm high-speed railway. The train to Munich does not stop in Oberhausen and goes via Cologne Messe/Deutz instead of Cologne Hauptbahnhof.

Line	Route				Stock
ICE 78	Amsterdam – Utrecht – Arnhem – Oberhausen – Duisburg – Düsseldorf –	Cologne –	Siegburg/Bonn – Frankfurt Airport –	Frankfurt	ICE 3neo
ICE 78	Amsterdam – Utrecht – Arnhem – Oberhausen – Duisburg – Düsseldorf –	Cologne Messe/Deutz –	Siegburg/Bonn – Frankfurt Airport –	Mannheim – Stuttgart – Ulm – Augsburg – Munich-Pasing – Munich	ICE 3neo

=== 79 ===
Line 79 connects Frankfurt (Main) with Brussels and operates in Germany on two high-speed lines: the Cologne–Aachen high-speed railway and the Cologne–Frankfurt high-speed railway. The first station beyond the Belgian border is Liège-Guillemins. Trains previously ran every four hours until services were intensified in December 2016 to run every two hours. Once a day the train stops at Limburg Sud, Montabaur, and Siegburg/Bonn.

Since September 2026, two trains a day run between Cologne and Antwerp via Brussels Airport and Leuven.

Line	Route		Stock
ICE 79	Brussels-South – Brussels-North –	Liège-Guillemins – Aachen – Cologne – Siegburg/Bonn – Montabaur – Limburg Süd – Frankfurt Airport – Frankfurt	ICE 3neo
ICE 79	Antwerp – Brussels Airport-Zaventem – Leuven –	Liège-Guillemins – Aachen – Cologne – Siegburg/Bonn – Montabaur – Limburg Süd – Frankfurt Airport – Frankfurt	ICE 3neo

== 82–84 ==
Lines 82 to 84 are international lines operated with the TGV from SNCF Voyageurs connecting western and southern Germany with France:

=== 82 ===
The line 82 begins at Frankfurt Hauptbahnhof and ends at Paris Gare de l'Est, a daily train pair also runs between Berlin and Frankfurt via Erfurt. It operates over the LGV Est, a French high-speed line. Trains run every four hours on the route via Saarbrücken, stopping in Forbach only once a day. Since the commissioning of a new section of the LGV Est in 2016, two train pairs are also routed via Strasbourg, creating an approximate two-hour cycle between Frankfurt, Mannheim and Paris. Both TGVs and ICEs run on the line.

Line	Route			Stock
ICE/TGV 82	Berlin Gesundbrunnen – Berlin Hbf – Berlin Südkreuz – Halle (Saale) – Erfurt – Frankfurt – Mannheim –	Kaiserslautern – Saarbrücken – Forbach –	Paris Est	TGV 2N2, ICE 3 Velaro D
ICE/TGV 82	Berlin Gesundbrunnen – Berlin Hbf – Berlin Südkreuz – Halle (Saale) – Erfurt – Frankfurt – Mannheim –	Karlsruhe – Strasbourg –	Paris Est	TGV 2N2, ICE 3 Velaro D

=== 83 ===
Line 83 starts in Stuttgart. From there, five pairs of trains run over the LGV Est to Paris Est. One train pair per day also runs between Stuttgart and Munich.

Line	Route	Stock
ICE/TGV 83	Munich – Augsburg – Ulm – Stuttgart – Karlsruhe – Strasbourg – Paris Est	TGV 2N2, ICE 3 Velaro D

=== 84 ===
The line 84 connects Frankfurt with Marseille over the LGV Rhin-Rhône and the LGV Méditerranée once a day.

Line	Route	Stock
ICE/TGV 84	Frankfurt – Mannheim – Karlsruhe – Baden-Baden – Strasbourg – Mulhouse-Ville – Belfort-Montbéliard – Besançon – Chalon – Lyon-Part-Dieu – Avignon – Aix-en-Provence – Marseille-Saint-Charles	TGV 2N2

== 85–91 ==
Lines 85, 88, 89, 90 and 91 are international lines that end in Switzerland, Austria and Hungary:

=== 85 ===
Line 85 has connected Frankfurt with Milan once a day through the Gotthard Base Tunnel since December 2017. It runs as EuroCity 151 from Basel to Milan. Since 2024, SBB RABe 501 ("Giruno") trainsets (previously ETR 610) of Swiss Federal Railways are used.

The line runs in Germany as EuroCity-Express (ECE) 85 and therefore it is not an ICE line, strictly speaking.

Line	Route	Stock
ECE 85	Frankfurt – Mannheim – Karlsruhe – Ringsheim – Freiburg – Basel Bad – Basel SBB – Olten – Lucerne – Arth-Goldau – Bellinzona – Lugano – Chiasso – Como – Monza – Milan	Giruno

In the opposite direction, the train runs between Milan and Olten via the Lötschberg axis (through the Lötschberg Base Tunnel). The journey time is 7:36 hours, which is only two minutes longer than the return journey. The train runs as EuroCity 52 as far as Basel.

Route
Milan – Stresa – Domodossola – Brig – Visp – Spiez – Thun – Bern – Olten – Basel SBB – Basel Bad – Freiburg – Ringsheim – Karlsruhe – Mannheim – Frankfurt

=== 88 ===
Line 88 is a EuroCity-Express service, that was introduced in December 2020. Since then, six pairs of trains have run between Munich and Zurich every two hours, replacing EuroCity line 88. It is operated with Alstom ETR 610 (Astoro) sets of the Swiss Federal Railways. It runs as EuroCity (EC) in Austria and Switzerland.

Line	Route	Stock
ECE 88	Munich – Buchloe – Memmingen – Lindau-Reutin – Bregenz – St. Margrethen – St. Gallen – Winterthur – Zürich Flughafen – Zürich	ETR 610

=== 89 ===
Line 89 was reintroduced with the timetable change in December 2016. Munich is connected with Feldkirch via Innsbruck once a day. Services on the line run only on Saturdays in the winter sports and the summer season.

Line	Route	Stock
ICE 89	Munich – München Ost – Rosenheim – Kufstein – Wörgl – Jenbach – Innsbruck – Telfs-Pfaffenhofen – Ötztal – Imst-Pitztal – Landeck-Zams – St. Anton – Langen – Bludenz – Feldkirch	Railjet

=== 90 ===
The 90 line connects Munich with Vienna and Budapest every two hours. It is one of the few ICE lines operated with Railjets (RJX).

Line	Route	Stock
ICE/RJX 90	Munich – München Ost – Rosenheim – Salzburg – Linz – St. Pölten – Wien Meidling – Vienna – Hegyeshalom – Mosonmagyaróvár – Győr – Tatabánya – Budapest-Kelenföld – Budapest Keleti	Railjet

=== 91 ===
Line 91 begins in Dortmund and runs via Würzburg and Nuremberg to Vienna every two hours. Two trains a day continue to Berlin and one onwards to Hamburg.

Line	Route			Stock
ICE 91	Dortmund – Bochum – Essen – Duisburg – Düsseldorf – Cologne – Bonn – Koblenz – Mainz – Frankfurt Airport – Frankfurt – Hanau – Asschaffenburg – Würzburg –		Nuremberg – Regensburg – Plattling – Passau – Wels – Linz – St. Pölten – Vienna Meidling – Vienna	ICE T
ICE 91	Hamburg-Altona – Hamburg – Büchen – Ludwigslust – Wittenberge – Berlin-Spandau –	Berlin – Berlin Südkreuz – Lutherstadt Wittenberg – Leipzig – Erfurt – Coburg –	Nuremberg – Regensburg – Plattling – Passau – Wels – Linz – St. Pölten – Vienna Meidling – Vienna	ICE T
ICE 91	Berlin Gesundbrunnen –	Berlin – Berlin Südkreuz – Lutherstadt Wittenberg – Leipzig – Erfurt – Coburg –	Nuremberg – Regensburg – Plattling – Passau – Wels – Linz – St. Pölten – Vienna Meidling – Vienna	ICE T

== See also ==
- List of Intercity-Express railway stations
