= Limburg Süd station =

Railway station in Limburg an der Lahn, Germany

Limburg Süd
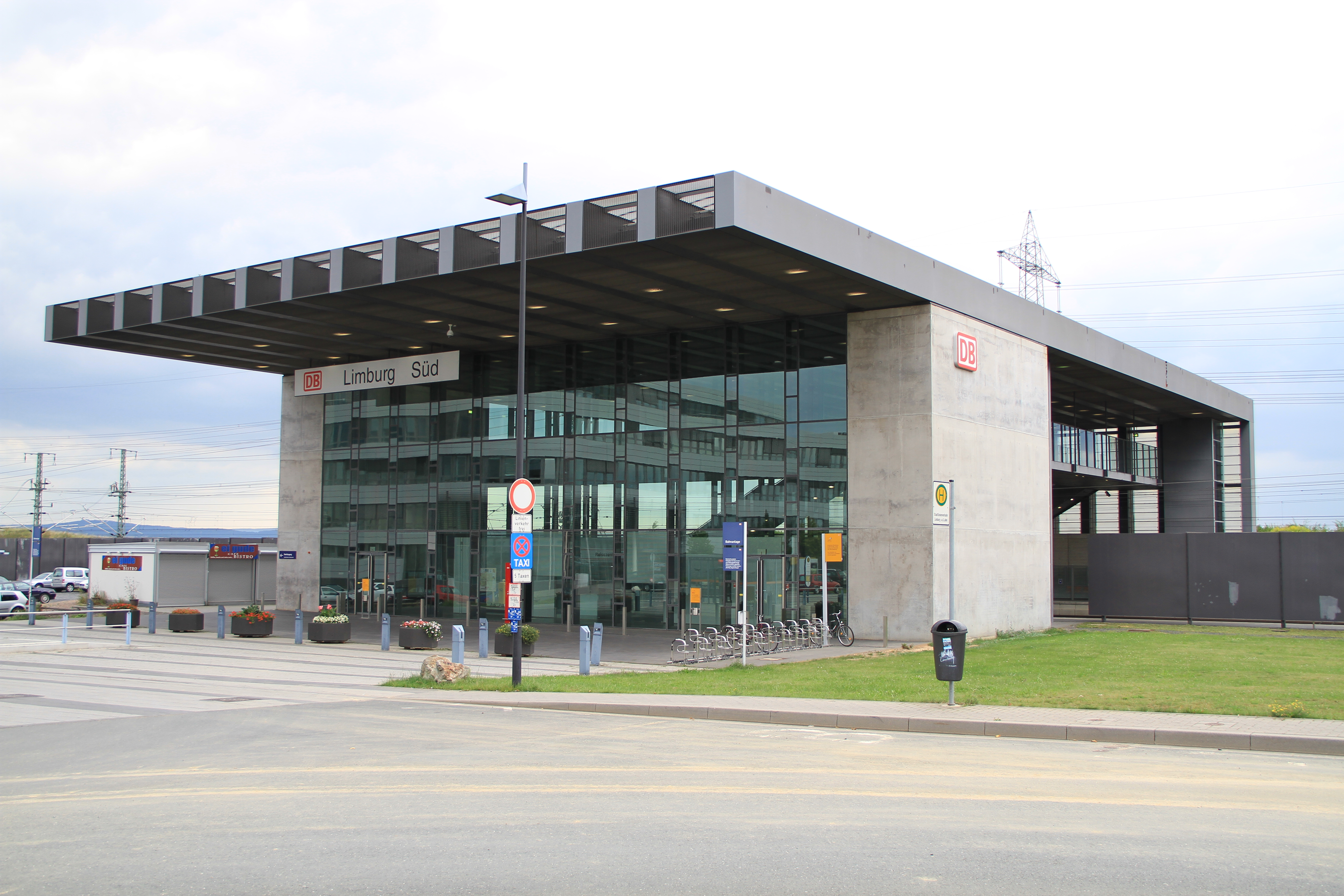
- Station building

General information
- Location: Londoner Str. 5, Limburg, Hesse; Germany
- Coordinates: 50°22′56″N 8°5′46″E
- Owner: Deutsche Bahn
- Operator: DB Netz; DB Station&Service
- Lines: Cologne-Frankfurt high-speed rail line (110.5 km) (KBS 472)
- Platforms: 2
- Train operators: DB Fernverkehr

Construction
- Accessible: Yes

Other information
- Station code: 3723
- DS100 code: FLIS
- IBNR: 8003680
- Category: 4
- Website: www.bahnhof.de

Passengers
- ca. 2,625 per day

Services
Preceding station	DB Fernverkehr	Following station
Montabaur towards Essen Hbf	ICE 41	Frankfurt Airport towards München Hbf
Montabaur towards Köln Hbf	ICE 45	Wiesbaden Hbf towards Stuttgart Hbf or Frankfurt (Main) Hbf
Montabaur towards Köln Hbf	ICE 49	Frankfurt Airport towards Frankfurt (Main) Hbf
Montabaur towards Brussels-South	ICE 79	Frankfurt Airport towards Frankfurt (Main) Hbf
Location

Limburg Süd (English: Limburg South) is a station in the town of Limburg an der Lahn, in the German state of Hesse. It is located in the Eschhöfer Feld ("Eschhofen field") in the district of Eschhofen at the 110.5 kilometre point of the Cologne–Frankfurt high-speed railway. Limburg Süd is the only station in Germany that is served solely by Intercity-Express (ICE) services.

== Infrastructure ==
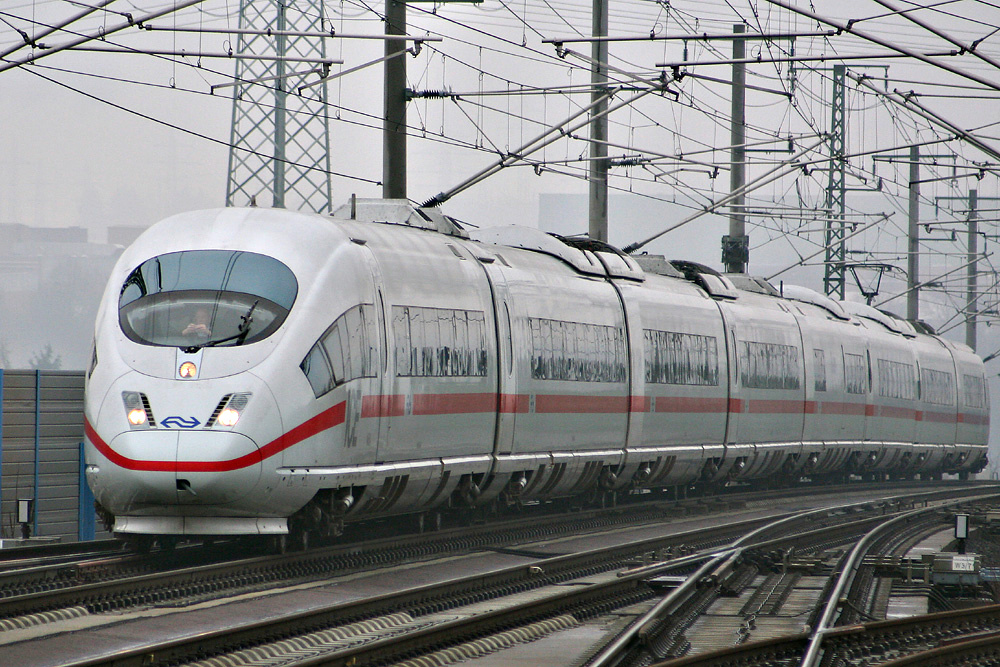
An ICE 3 running through Limburg Süd without stopping

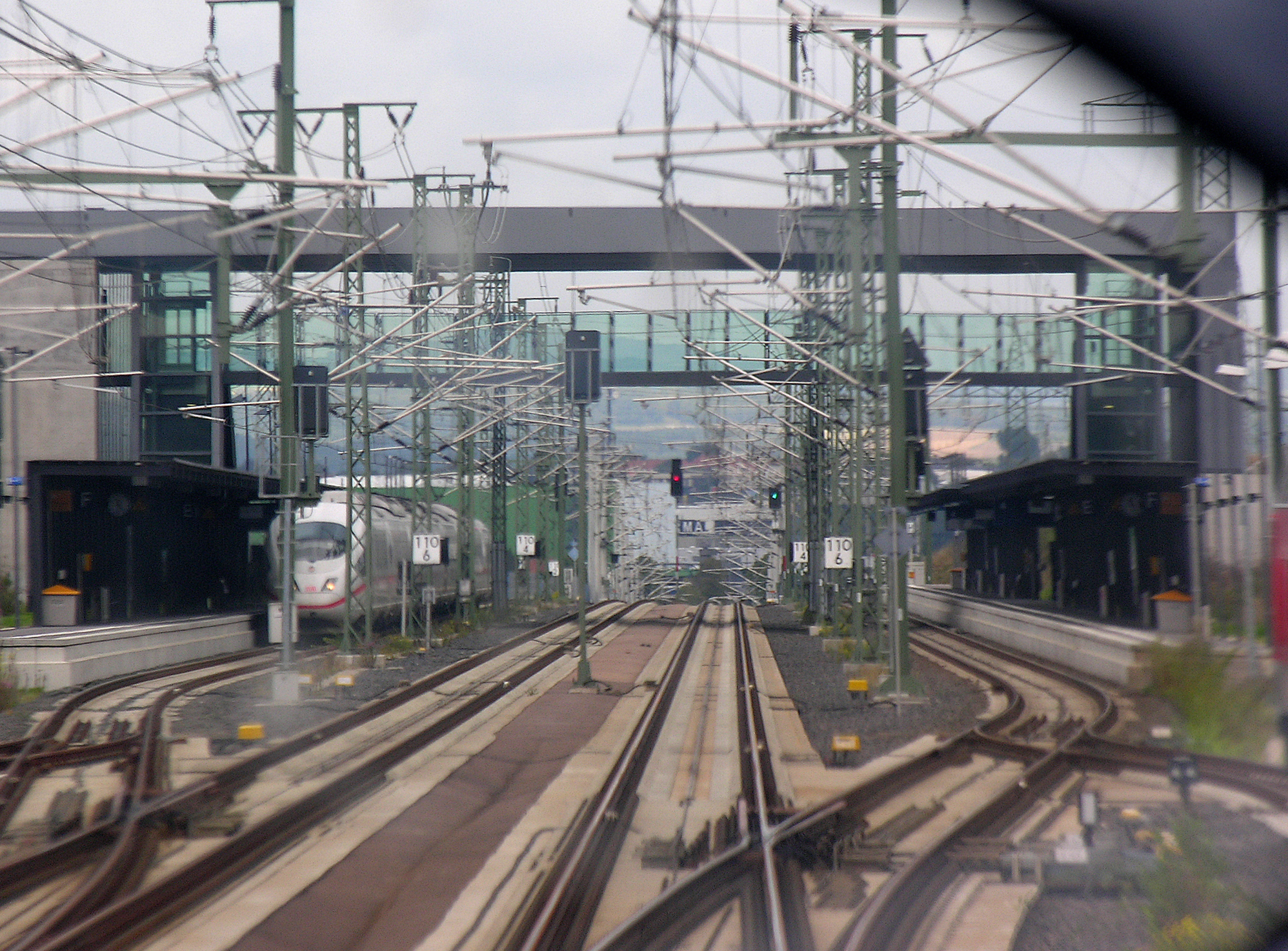
View from the cab of an ICE in Limburg Süd running to Cologne

The entrance building, which has 300 square metres (3,200 sq ft) of usable space, is located on platform 1 (used by trains to Frankfurt) and houses the Deutsche Bahn travel centre, waiting benches and vending machines for beverages and confectioneries. There are no public toilets in the station itself, but there are some in the adjacent parking garage. Alternatively, there is a coin-operated toilet cubicle in the forecourt.

The 180-square-metre (1,900 sq ft) area on the second floor has been largely empty since the opening of the station. However, it is now planned to establish a control room of DB Energie there.

=== Railway tracks ===
The station has four tracks. The two middle tracks serve as through tracks and are built as slab tracks. ICE trains can pass through the station without decelerating at up to 300 kilometres per hour (190 mph), while stopping trains running to the two outer platforms can pass over the turnouts at 100 kilometres per hour (62 mph). Platform 4 (serving trains to Cologne) is reached over a bridge spanning the track, which has a staircase and a lift at each end.

The 405-metre-long (1,329 ft) and 3.4-metre-wide (11 ft) platforms have canopies over a length of 300 metres (980 ft). An 11-metre-high (36 ft) and 36-metre-wide (118 ft) roof spans all four tracks.

North of the platform a crossover allows a track change from the western to the eastern track. 2 kilometres (1.2 mi) towards Frankfurt (113.0 km point), at the Lindenholzhausen crossover, it is possible to change tracks from the east to the west track. The crossovers are passable at 100 kilometres per hour (62 mph) while changing tracks. A sub-centre of the electronic interlocking system and an electric sub-station (which is also linked to the public network) have also been established in the area of the station.

== Operations ==
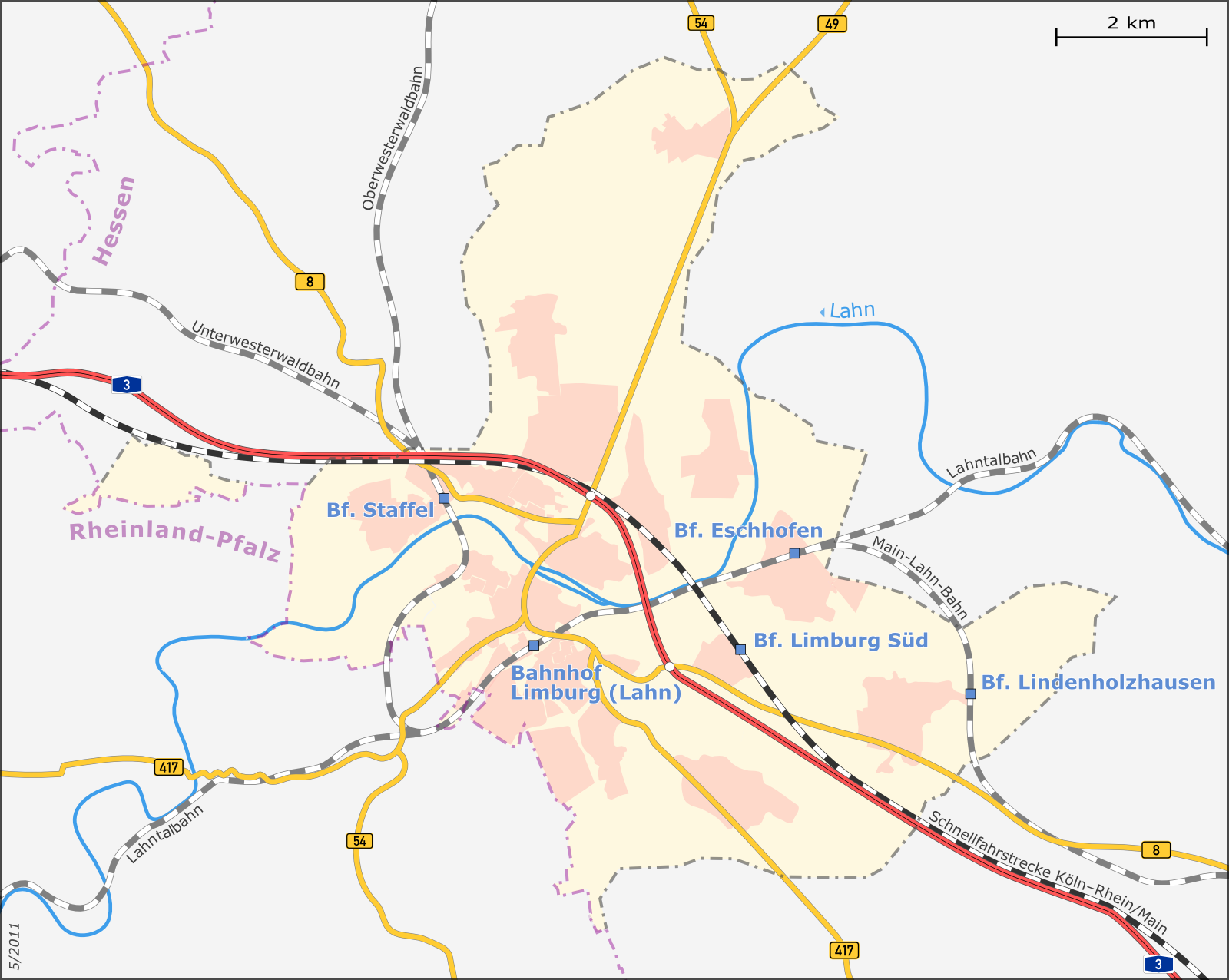
Location of Limburg Süd and transport links from Limburg a. d. Lahn

The majority of trains travelling between Frankfurt (Main) Airport Long-Distance Station and Köln Messe/Deutz Station run past Limburg Süd and Montabaur stations without stopping. The trains that pass through Cologne Central Station stop in both Limburg Süd and Montabaur stations before reaching Frankfurt (Main) Airport Long-Distance Station and vice versa.

Most parts of the Cologne–Frankfurt high-speed rail line have steeper ascending and descending grades of 4%. This unique feature requires a higher power-to-weight ratio: ICE 3 with its power linear eddy current brakes is the only train type licensed to operate on this railway: no other service, such as slower regional trains, is permitted. This makes Limburg Süd the only station in Germany to be served exclusively by high speed train services.

In the 2026 timetable the following services stop at the station:

Line	Route	Frequency
ICE 41	Essen – Duisburg – Köln Messe/Deutz – Montabaur – Limburg Süd – Frankfurt Airport – Frankfurt (Main) Hbf – Würzburg – Nuremberg – Munich	Some trains
ICE 45	Cologne – Cologne/Bonn Airport – Montabaur – Limburg Süd – Wiesbaden – Mainz – Mannheim – Heidelberg – Vaihingen – Stuttgart	Some trains
ICE 49	Cologne – Siegburg/Bonn – Montabaur – Limburg Süd – Frankfurt Airport – Frankfurt (Main) Hbf	Every 2 hours
ICE 79	Brussels – Aachen – Cologne – Siegburg/Bonn – Limburg Süd – Frankfurt Airport – Frankfurt (Main) Hbf	Some trains, start and end of the day

=== Public transport ===
Limburg (Lahn) station in central Limburg is connected to Limburg Süd by bus and taxi service. In the beginning, a shuttle bus service between both stations was provided, and its timetable was co-ordinated with the arrivals and departures of the ICE service. However, the low demand caused the service to be stopped and replaced with several local bus lines, which offer passengers more options than the shuttle bus service.

Several long distance bus operators also stop at Limburg Süd. DeinBus, Flixbus, and OneBus offer the connections to Aachen, Bonn, Cologne-Bonn Airport, Frankfurt am Main, Heidelberg, Heilbronn, Stuttgart Airport, and Tübingen.

Despite its proximity to the district of Eschhofen, no direct road link to Eschhofen has ever been built.

=== Parking ===
On the west side of the station is a 306-space car park for short-term parking. Adjacent to the station in the east is a six-storey parking garage with 573 spaces for vehicles, 24 for bicycles, a charging station (for electric vehicles), and public toilet facilities. It was opened in 2011 after 19 months of construction. Because of the parking fees, many commuters prefer to park on the streets rather than pay to use the parking garage.

== History ==
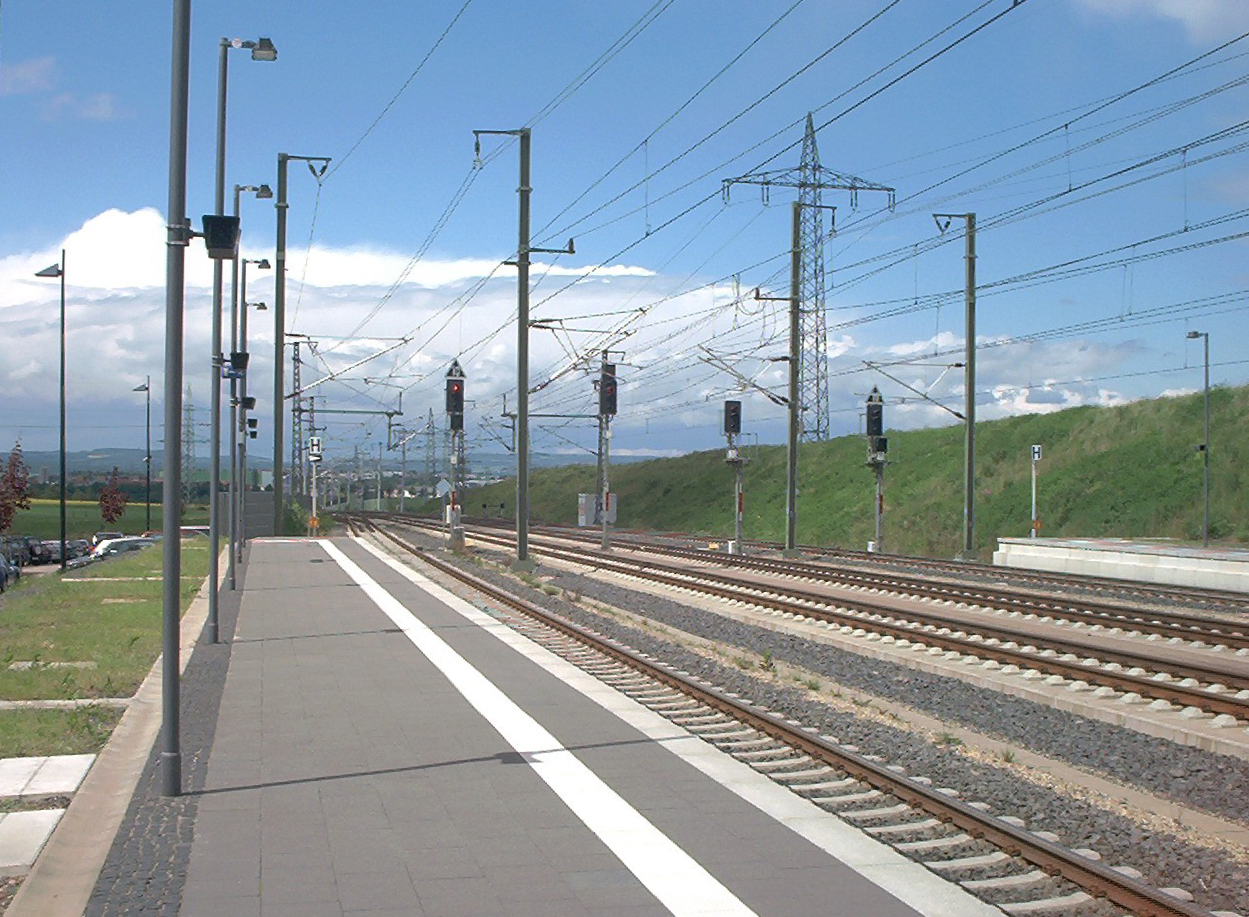
Views of the Cologne-Frankfurt high-speed rail line, running towards Cologne, from Limburg Süd station

The planning of a Cologne–Gross-Gerau high-speed railway in the 1970s envisaged a station between Limburg and Diez on its right bank (east of the Rhine) route option. The station would have been located south of the Lahn and west of the existing station and above the Lahntal railway. Trains on the existing line from Wetzlar would have connected to services to Cologne and trains from Niederlahnstein would have connected to services towards Frankfurt. The four-track infrastructure would have had, in addition to the two central through tracks, two external platform tracks connected by scissors crossovers (with four sets of points) at each end of the station. The proposed station was assessed as having "predominantly regional importance", which justified "only a limited number of train stops".

After the completion of the route selection process, Federal Cabinet decided on 20 December 1989 that the line would be built on the route of the high-speed line along the A3, as built. It also agreed to the building of a station at Limburg. An option running through the Rhine Valley was now finally off the table. In the same way that the state of Rhineland-Palatinate demanded a station at Montabaur, the state of Hesse demanded a station on its territory. In an agreement of March 1990 the premiers of the two states as well as the federal transport minister noted that there was consensus that "a stop was required in the Limburg area".

=== Discussion of options ===
As part of the coordination between the federal government and the two states three options were tested in Limburg:

- The establishment of a station in Limburg, along with a station in Montabaur. The additional station in Montabaur would compensate for the lack of a connection to the Lahntal railway, which would not be possible in this option and was mainly required by the state of Hesse and corporations in the Limburg/Gießen area. Instead, the area of Koblenz would access Montabaur station by car (Dernbach interchange and Montabaur exit). Montabaur station also offered the possibility of a connection to the Lower Westerwald Railway to Siershahn. The cost of this option in 1991 was estimated to be 30 million Deutschmark (DM).
- The establishment of a station in Limburg-Eschhofen was also discussed. Passengers would have to overcome a height difference of about 40 metres (130 ft) between the Lahntal railway and the new line to change trains. The town of Limburg saw this option as the best way to link to the town's road network and promote urban development. The costs were estimated at DM 90 million (1991 prices).
- The establishment of a station between Diez and Limburg, west of the above two options, which would have bypassed the easterly city of Limburg, was also examined. A link between the Lahntal railway and the new line would have been short. The then Deutsche Bundesbahn saw disadvantages in the necessary construction of a 1.5-kilometre-long (0.9 mi) viaduct over the Lahn and greater landscape fragmentation as a result of separation from the route of Autobahn 3 (A3). The cost of this option was estimated at about DM 65 million. This option was discarded not least due to the resulting fragmentation of the Diersteiner Aue (Dierstein floodplain) and the need to cross large deposits of limestone would have made it difficult to prevent the contamination of potable water.

The board of Deutsche Bundesbahn selected the first option for the high-speed line on 8 March 1991. The selection of the current location meant a comparatively small expenditure at the cost of a missing link to the transport network and a secluded position; it also necessitated the construction of the 2.4-kilometre-long (1.5 mi) Limburg tunnel through a water protection zone. The station would be built at a green-field location about 2.5 kilometres (1.6 mi) southeast of the city centre and close to the A 3. The traffic forecast assumed that 90 percent of rail passengers would use cars to reach or leave the station, connecting with ICEs.

Before the decision about the Rhine route in the Federal Cabinet, the then premier of Rhineland-Palatinate, Carl-Ludwig Wagner 1989 called for a so-called option S in an interview in July. This envisaged a right bank route taking a sharp curve from Dernbach through a tunnel and a bridge over the Rhine to Koblenz before taking another sharp curve back over another Rhine crossing to a purely right bank route to Frankfurt. The estimated additional costs of this option were DM 1.3 to 2.8 billion (about €0.7 to 1.4 billion). The Federal Transport Minister, Friedrich Zimmermann spoke of a "provincial farce" and suggested, as a compromise, the establishment of a high-speed station in Limburg to provide a connection with Koblenz. In addition to the establishment of the station, the compromise proposal provided for a package of other railway infrastructure in Rhineland-Palatinate. The then Deutsche Bundesbahn initially accepted the route via Limburg and Vilich in order to prevent further delays to the project.

=== Planning ===
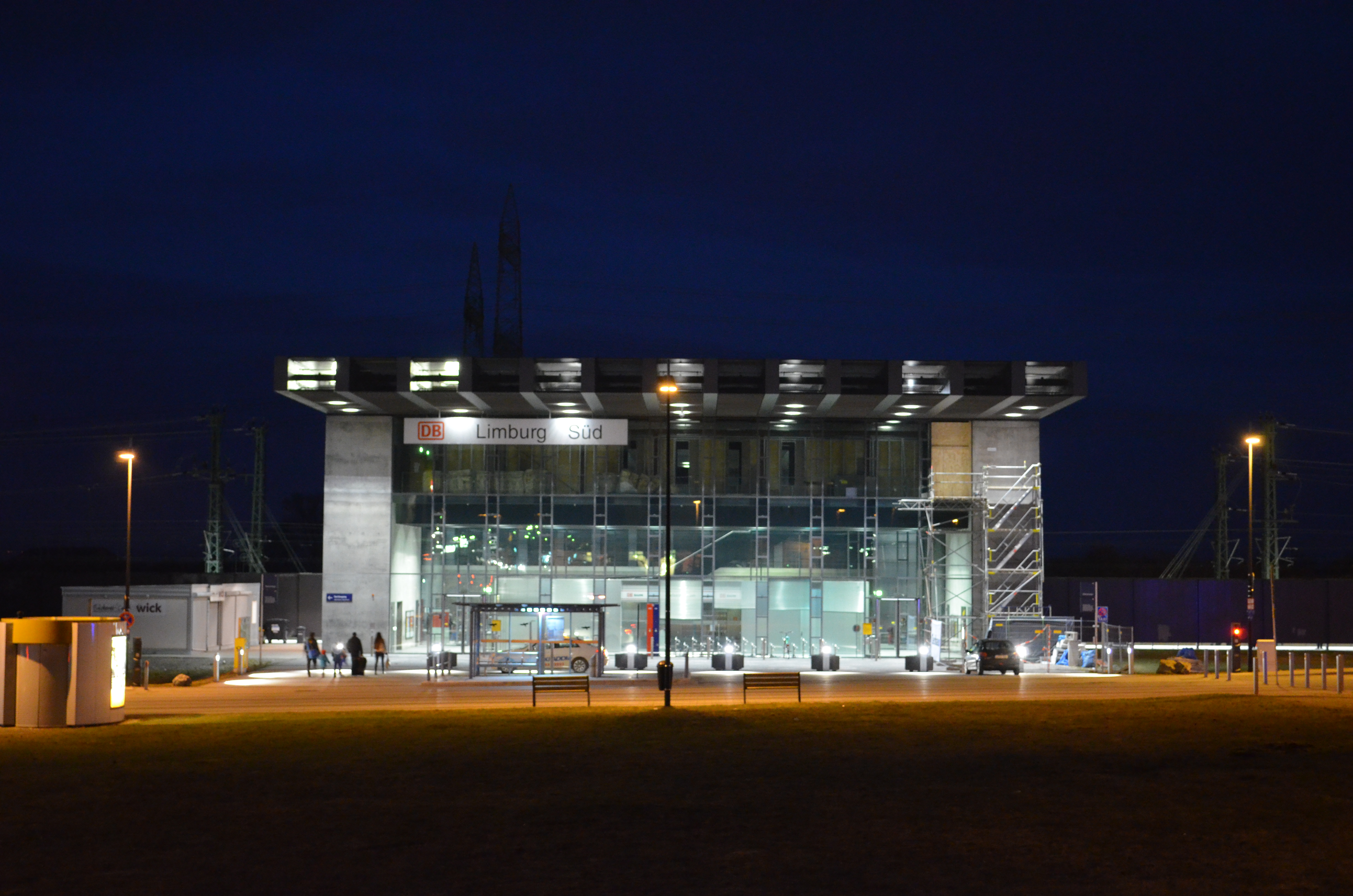
Limburg Süd station at night

The regional planning approval process of the Giessen region was commenced for the section in January 1991 and completed in July 1994. Thus the position of the station in Limburg was established. The Eschhofen variation, which provided for an eastern curve around the city, was introduced into the planning approval process. The station was part of zoning section 31.3, which stretched from the Limburg tunnel to the town limits. At the end of 1994, the facility was designed with five tracks. The planning approval was issued on 25 June 1997. It was based on a design by the Berlin architects Weinkamm.

As planned in 1995, Limburg Süd and Montabaur would be among five stations on the new Cologne–Rhine/Main line.

Deutsche Bahn, the town of Limburg and the State of Hesse ran a competition for the design of the station and its environment in 1997. In early 1997, the jury chose from 35 proposals received a "flying carpet" design from the Düsseldorf architecture office of Schuster. The name "flying carpet" referred to a 16-metre-wide (52 ft) bridge that would be built over the tracks, appearing from the distance to float. The jury praised the design as creative and economically convincing. The design was modified in some respects before the start of construction.

On 13 July 1998, Limburg council agreed to fund DM 1.5 million of the planned construction costs of DM 36 million (€18 million). This was linked to two conditions: the future of the station must be guaranteed in the long term and Limburg would become part of the Rhein-Main-Verkehrsverbund (Rhine-Main Transport Association, RMV). The actual design of the station and its associated costs had still not been finalised, but it was expected to cost DM 36 million.

The construction and financing agreement for Limburg Süd station was signed in mid-2000 by representatives of Deutsche Bahn, the state of Hesse and the city of Limburg. It was planned that one train per hour in each direction would stop at the station; at other times trains would stop every two-hours. In addition, it was intended to allow the tickets of the RMV to be used on the trains.

On 31 January 2001, representatives of Deutsche Bahn and the mayor of the town of Limburg, Martin Richard, signed a contract for the development of the area surrounding the station. It regulated the exchange of land and changes to land use planning in this area.

The more elaborate scheme that was initially planned at a cost of DM 42 million was reduced to half that cost. As estimated in 2000 and 2001, the scheme should have cost DM 28.5 million (€14.6 million), with DM 12.5 million to be funded by the federal government, DM 8.5 million by the state, 6.0 million DM by Deutsche Bahn and DM 1.5 million by the town of Limburg. In 2002, construction costs were given as €14.6 million.

=== Construction and commissioning ===
In mid-1999, the first pre-construction activities were carried out at the station site. The start of construction was expected in the same year.

In the course of preliminary archaeological explorations more than fifty archaeological monuments were discovered in the area of the future station. The discoveries, which were up to 7,000 years old, showed that significant trade had been carried out for centuries in the area of today's station.

The construction of the station began with a groundbreaking ceremony on 24 September 2001. The station building was completed on 12 July 2002. 9000 sq m of earth was excavated for the station building and 2,000 cubic metres of concrete or reinforced concrete were poured.

On 1 August 2002, the station was opened for operations along with the new line. More than 2,000 people, including the premier of Hesse, Roland Koch, watched the arrival of the first ICE 3, which arrived six minutes ahead of schedule in Limburg in the early morning of 1 August 2002.

From the commissioning of the new line, two class 218 locomotives were stationed at the station, ready to tow broken-down trains on the new line. These were removed in 2010/2011.

South Limburg was one of three intermediate stations between Cologne and Frankfurt Airport that was served by every third train. The station building was completed in November 2003.

=== Passenger Traffic and Economic Benefit ===
The passenger traffic had gradually increased since its opening in 2002. The robust increase of 32 per cent from 2003 to 2005 assured that Limburg Süd would remain utilised after an operational review in 2007. The daily passenger count has remained stable between 2,500 and 2,700 ever since.

A survey done in 2004 showed 96 per cent of passengers boarding the trains between 5 and 9 o'clock in the morning were commuters. The majority of passengers are commuting to Frankfurt am Main.

A 2010 study by the University of Hamburg and the London School of Economics and Political Science showed the small economic growth of 2.7 per cent from 2002 to 2006 in the surrounding area of Limburg Süd and Montabaur stations.

== Criticism ==
Limburg Süd and Montabaur stations were subjected to heavy criticism from the beginning. The criticism is due to:

- high construction cost;
- smaller population served (34,000 and 12,500 respectively);
- potential insufficient number of passengers to support the operational cost;
- close proximity of both stations (20 kilometres (12 mi) apart);
- lack of commercial sites nearby.

Montabaur station is the result of political blackmail by Rhineland-Palatinate who demanded a station be built in Montabaur before approving the process of building a new high speed railway.
