= Frankfurt Airport long-distance station =

Railway station in Frankfurt, Germany

Frankfurt am Main Flughafen Fernbahnhof
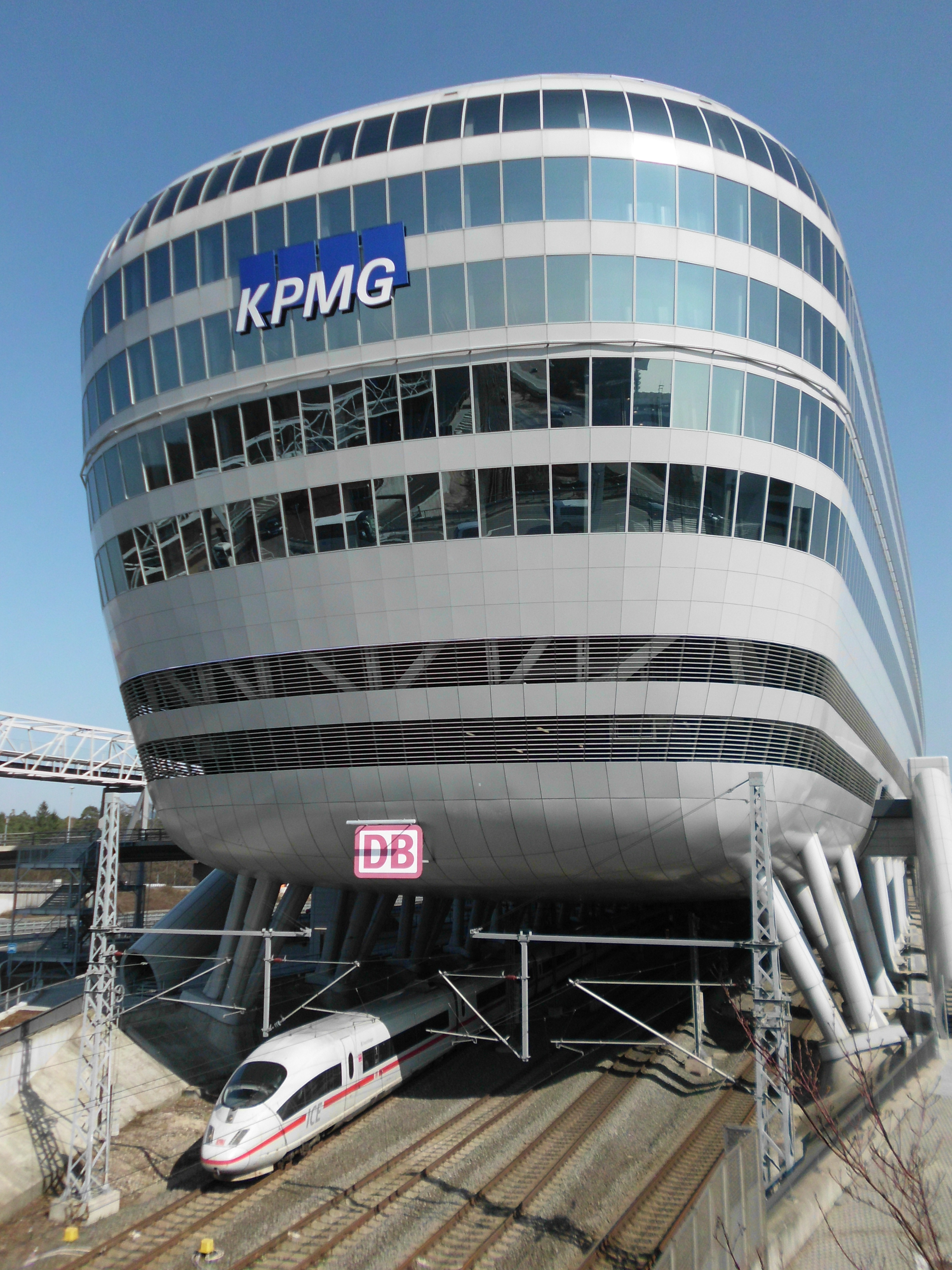
- ICE 3 departing westward underneath The Squaire

General information
- Location: Hugo-Eckener-Ring 1, Frankfurt, Hesse; Germany
- Coordinates: 50°03′10″N 8°34′12″E
- Owner: Deutsche Bahn
- Operator: DB InfraGO
- Line: Cologne–Frankfurt high-speed rail line
- Platforms: 2
- Tracks: 4

Construction
- Accessible: Yes

Other information
- Station code: 7982
- DS100 code: FFLF
- Category: 3
- Fare zone: : 5090
- Website: www.bahnhof.de

History
- Opened: 30 May 1999; 27 years ago

Passengers
- 2009: 23,000 per day
Services
Preceding station	DB Fernverkehr	Following station
Mainz Hbf towards Hamburg-Altona	ICE 1 Sprinter	Frankfurt (Main) Hbf towards Passau Hbf
Reverses direction	ICE 11	Frankfurt (Main) Hbf towards Berlin Gesundbrunnen
Reverses direction	ICE 11	Mannheim Hbf towards München Hbf
Reverses direction	ICE 12	Frankfurt (Main) Hbf One-way operation
Reverses direction	ICE 12	Frankfurt (Main) Süd towards Berlin Ostbahnhof
Terminus	ICE 13	Frankfurt (Main) Süd towards Berlin Ostbahnhof
Mainz Hbf One-way operation	ICE/ECE 20	Frankfurt (Main) Hbf towards Hamburg Hbf
Köln Messe/Deutz towards Dortmund Hbf or Essen Hbf	ICE 41	Frankfurt (Main) Hbf towards München Hbf
Siegburg/Bonn towards Hamburg-Altona	ICE 42	Mannheim Hbf towards München Hbf
Siegburg/Bonn towards Hamburg-Altona or Amsterdam Centraal	ICE 43	Mannheim Hbf towards Basel SBB, Chur or Brig
Köln Messe/Deutz towards Dortmund Hbf	ICE 47	Mannheim Hbf towards München Hbf
Limburg Süd towards Köln Hbf	ICE 49	Frankfurt (Main) Hbf Terminus
Mainz Hbf towards Wiesbaden Hbf	ICE 50	Frankfurt (Main) Hbf towards Dresden Hbf
Köln Messe/Deutz towards Münster Hbf	ICE 62	Mannheim Hbf towards Graz Hbf
Köln Messe/Deutz towards Dortmund Hbf	ICE 62 Bodensee	Mannheim Hbf towards Innsbruck Hbf
Siegburg/Bonn towards Amsterdam Centraal	ICE 78	Frankfurt (Main) Hbf Terminus
Siegburg/Bonn towards Amsterdam Centraal	ICE 78	Mannheim Hbf towards München Hbf
Limburg Süd towards Brussels-South	ICE 79	Frankfurt (Main) Hbf Terminus
Mainz Hbf towards Dortmund Hbf	ICE 91	Frankfurt (Main) Hbf towards Wien Hbf
Preceding station	ÖBB	Following station
Mainz Hbf towards Amsterdam Centraal	Nightjet	Frankfurt (Main) Süd towards Zürich HB
Preceding station	Hessische Landesbahn	Following station
Rüsselsheim towards Rüsselsheim Opelwerk	RB 58 via Frankfurt Süd - Hanau	Frankfurt (Main) Süd towards Laufach
Location

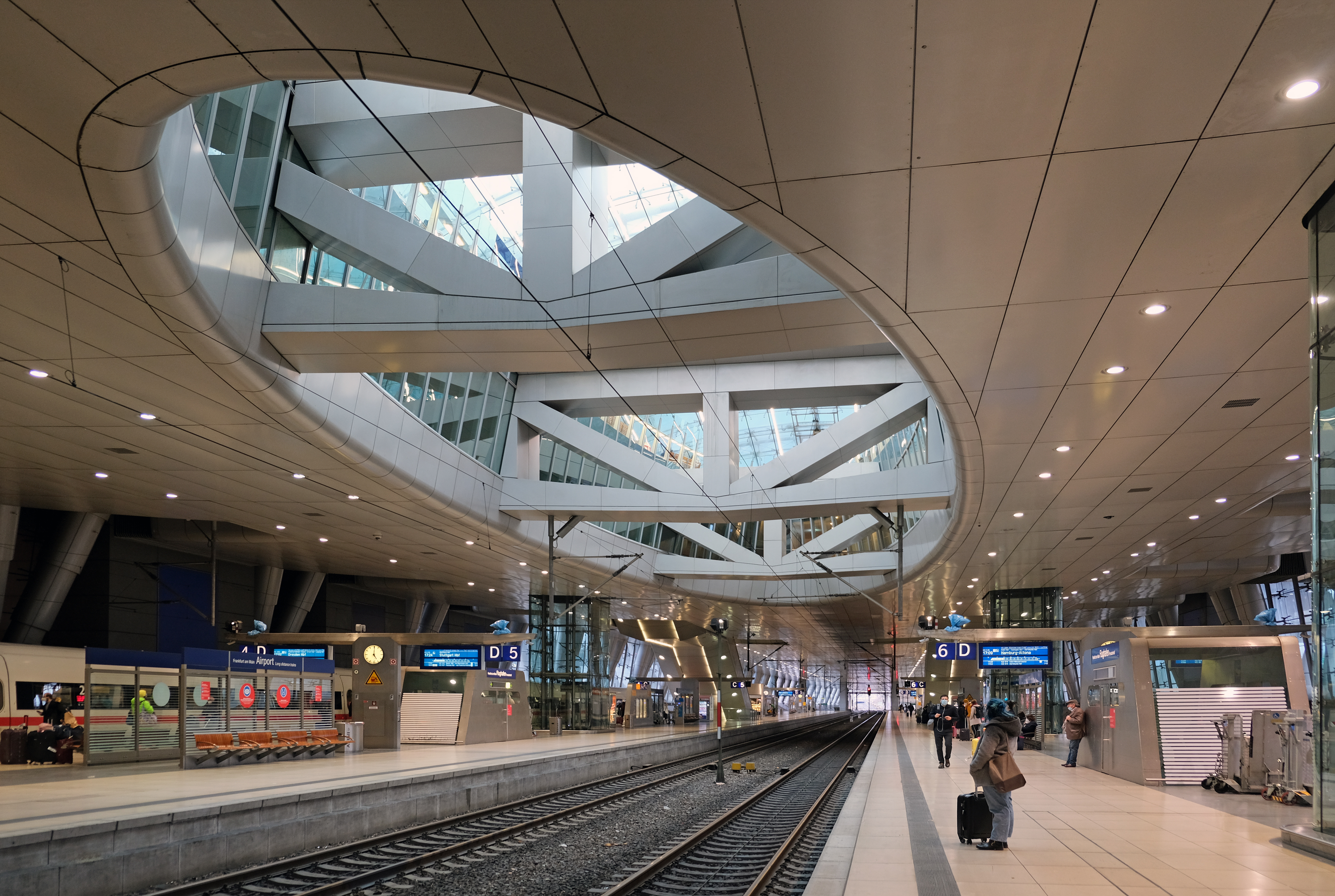
On the platforms

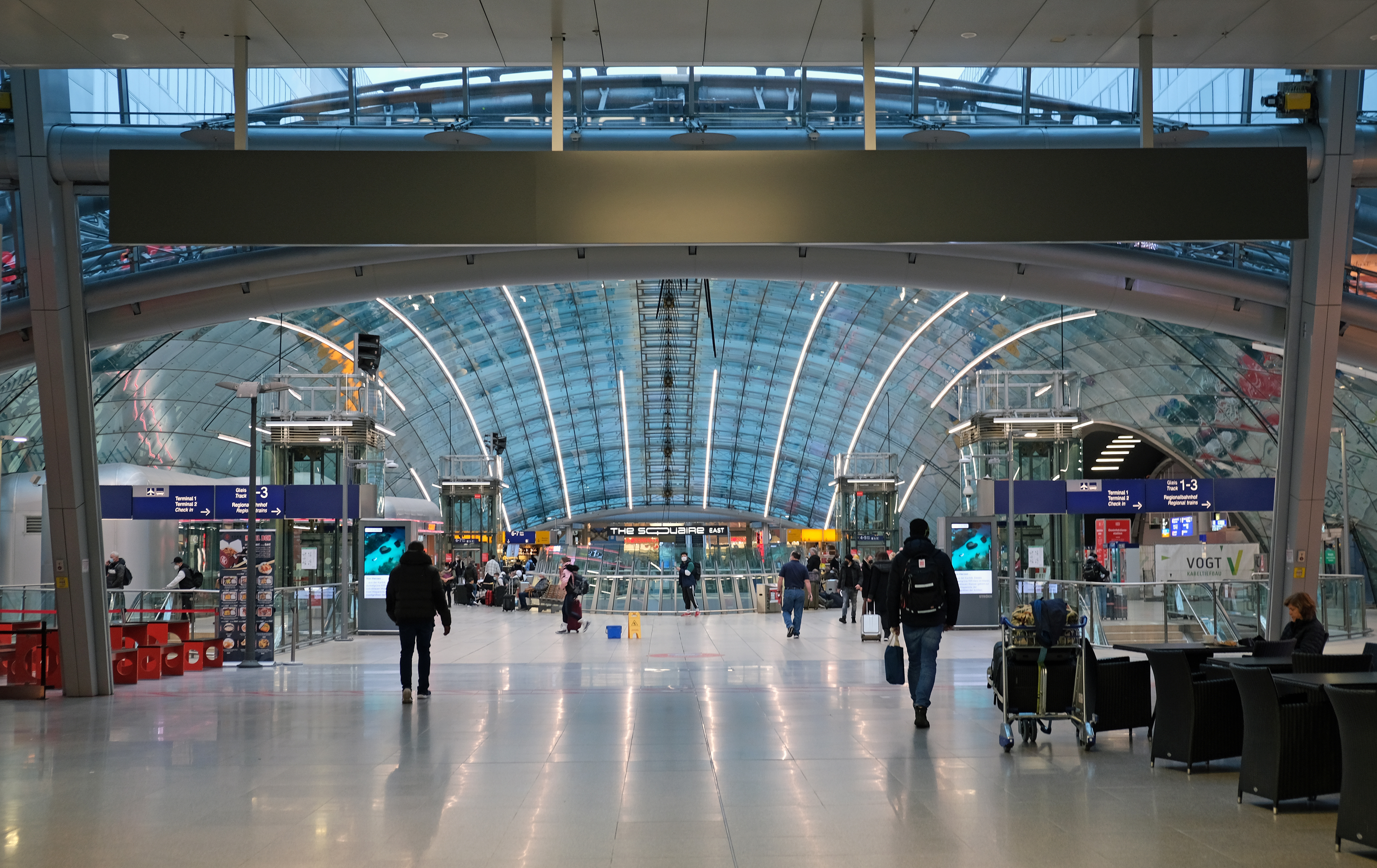
Ticket hall and lounge

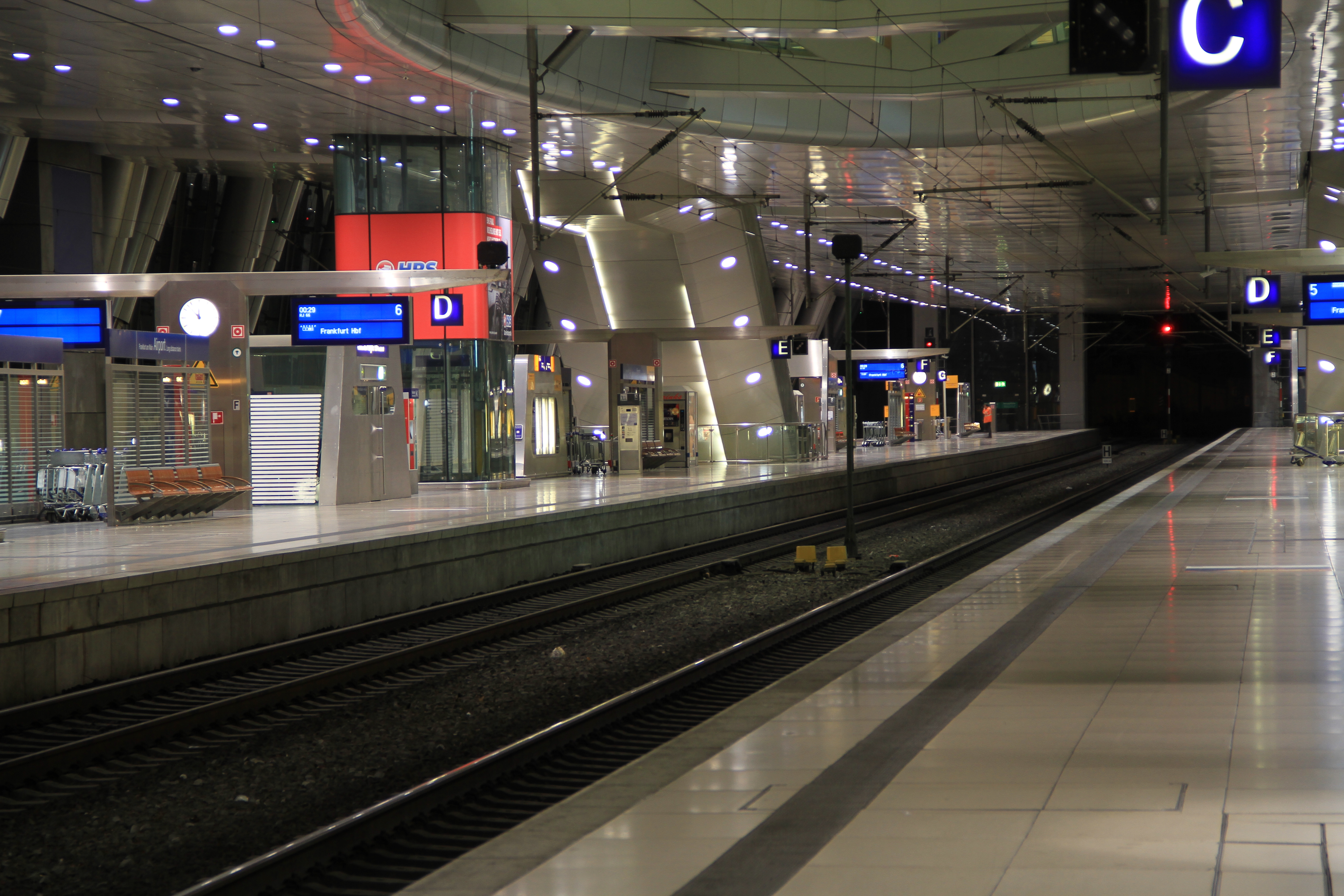
On the platforms by night

Rail connections

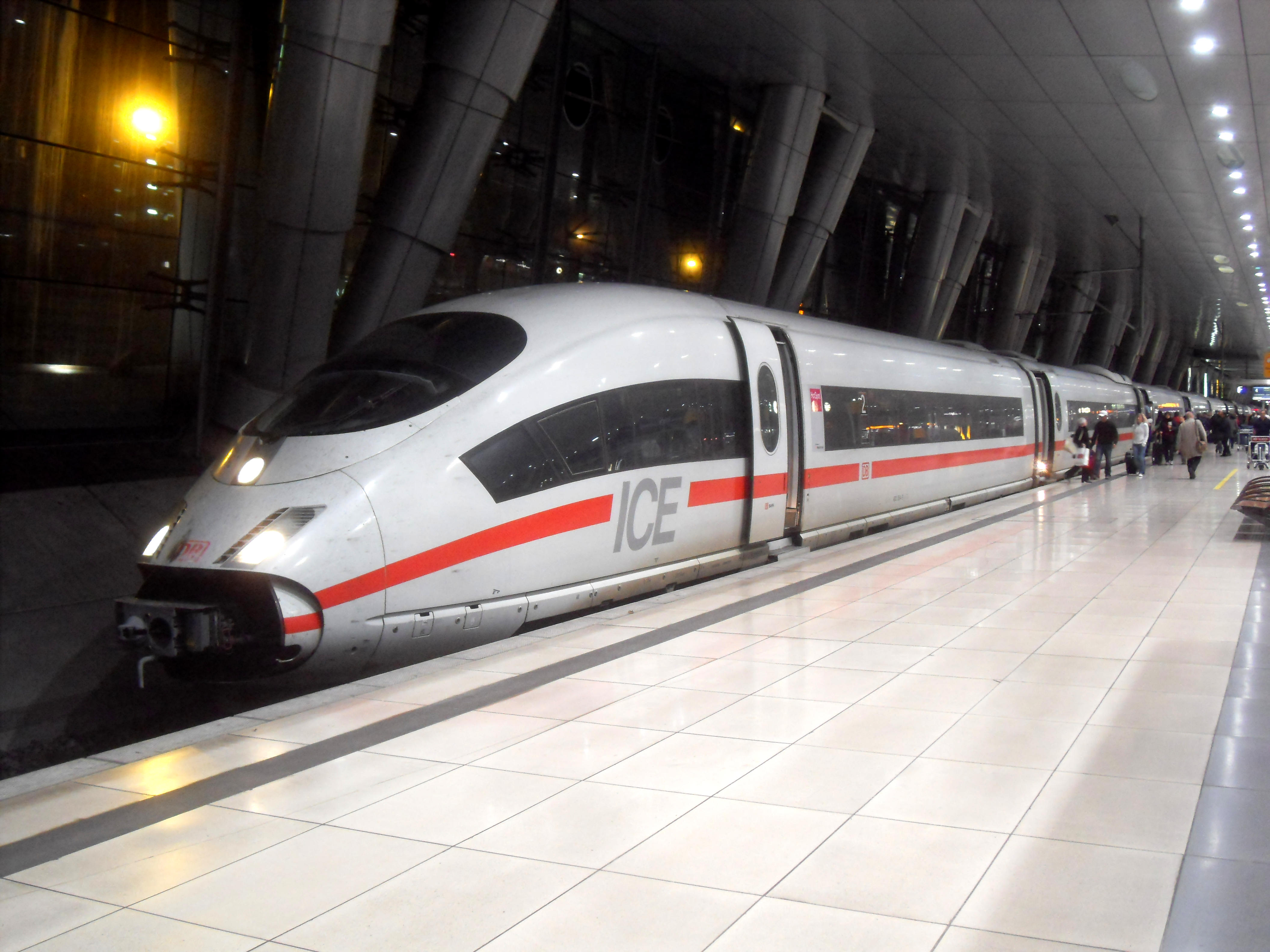
An ICE 3 at platform 4 (2009)

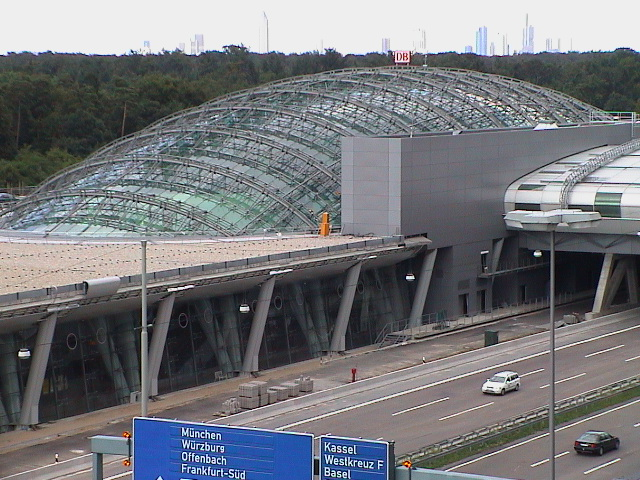
Exterior of station in 2000. The glass dome is now integrated into a development called The Squaire

Frankfurt am Main Airport long-distance station (German: Frankfurt am Main Flughafen Fernbahnhof) is a railway station at Frankfurt Airport in Frankfurt, Germany. It is served by long-distance trains, mostly ICE services running on the Cologne–Frankfurt high-speed rail line. It is the largest railway station serving an airport in Germany with about 23,000 passengers each day. As of 2014, the station was served by 210 long-distance trains daily.

The station was opened in 1999 as part of the first part of the Cologne–Frankfurt high-speed line; the great majority of the high-speed line opened in 2002. It is 660 m (2,170 ft) long and 45 m (148 ft) high. It features a large dome containing a lounge area and a ticket hall, and is connected to the airport by a skyway that crosses the Autobahn 3.

Above the station The Squaire, a one-billion-euro complex (containing office space, hotels, convention centres and other facilities), has been built.

Nearby is Frankfurt Airport regional station which is located beneath Terminal 1 of the airport and which provides local S-Bahn services to Frankfurt, Wiesbaden and Mainz.

== Design and location ==
The station is located between the Frankfurter Kreuz Tunnel—which runs under the Frankfurter Kreuz, an important autobahn interchange in the east, connecting toward Frankfurt Central Station and Mannheim, and Kelsterbacher Spange (Kelsterbach Link) Tunnel in the west, the beginning of the high-speed section of the new line.

The 660-metre (2,170 ft)-long and up to 55-metre (180 ft)-wide station building was designed by BRT Architects (Bothe, Richter, Teherani). After nearly four years of construction, it was opened in 1999. The entire station is glazed on the outside and appears to be open. The upper deck is at a height of 12.5 metres (41 ft) and is composed of a 30 centimetres (12 in) thick reinforced concrete slab with an area of about 34,000 square metres (370,000 sq ft). The slab is supported by steel beams, which transfer their loads on to 4.5 metres (15 ft) thick trusses. These span across the railway station with a maximum span of about 50 metres (160 ft) and are 15 metres (49 ft) apart. The trusses are designed to support a building that is up to eight storeys high. The maximum load capacity of the reinforced concrete slab is 700 kilograms per square metre.

Until early 2007, the station was located in the middle of a large trench covered only by the biaxially curved glass dome. This has a maximum height of 115 metres (49 ft), a length of 135 metres (443 ft) and a width of 40 metres (130 ft).

The station has two island platforms, which are each served by two tracks. The platform tracks are numbered "Gleis 4" (long-distance 4) to "Gleis 7", continuing on from platforms 1 to 3 of the existing regional station opened in 1972. Trains scheduled to use platform tracks 6 and 7 run toward Mainz and Cologne, while platforms 4 and 5 are used for services toward Frankfurt Central Station, Frankfurt South station or the Mannheim–Frankfurt railway toward Mannheim. The only scheduled services stopping at the long-distance station are long-distance trains.

The long-distance station is located about 200 metres from Terminal 1, between the Autobahn 3 and the Bundesstraße 43, which both run parallel to it on either side of it. A 200 metres (660 ft) long and up to 80 metres (260 ft) wide walkway was constructed to connect the station building to Terminal 1. This supports footpaths and moving walkways, check-in counters, baggage screening and various shops.

On the mezzanine, between the platform and distribution level, there are among other things, a Deutsche Bahn lounge for first class passengers and frequent travellers. This can also be reached by lift directly from the 6/7 platform.

== History ==
=== Planning ===
As part of the planning for the Cologne-Frankfurt high-speed line, ways of connecting high-speed trains on the line to the airport were investigated. Originally, the regional station was to be expanded as part of the new line project with a fourth track. Despite the high cost of the reconstruction of the existing station it was forecast that the capacity would not be sufficient in the medium term. Another proposal considered was to build an additional station in the existing building. Although a feasibility study found that would have had positive returns, this option was rejected due to its high cost. The board of the former Deutsche Bundesbahn decided in April 1990 to build an above ground long-distance station. If there was sufficient traffic demand, the new station would also serve regional traffic from the south.

The establishment of a new station between the A 3 and B 43 was examined for its economic justification for long-distance traffic as well as for the regional traffic towards Mannheim. Two options were examined for connections from the airport station to the new line. In addition to the realised route along the A3 via Mönchhof, a route running north towards the Mainz–Kelsterbach–Frankfurt line through the southern outskirts of Kelsterbach was examined. A connection with the Mainz-Frankfurt line was provided in both cases. Deutsche Bundesbahn classified the (unrealised) Klaraberg route as favourable for operations. The Mönchhof option had lower costs and lower environmental impact on Kelsterbach. The establishment of connecting curves between the new line and the line to Mainz would reduce the operational drawbacks of the Mönchhof option.

The planning approval process for the airport station and the section to Frankfurter Kreuz autobahn interchange, collectively called "section 36", was initiated in April 1994 as the first of around 50 planning approval processes for the new line.

=== Building ===
The project was jointly implemented by Deutsche Bahn and Flughafen Frankfurt/Main AG (Frankfurt/Main Airport Company, FAG, now Fraport). Construction work on the line began in December 1995. In September 1996, Deutsche Bahn awarded the first contracts for the construction of the station and its associated tracks. The top deck of the station was designed to support a building complex, although its nature had not been determined.

The groundbreaking ceremony was held on 1 October 1997. Among the guests were the Minister of Transport, Matthias Wissmann, the Hessian Premier Hans Eichel, Frankfurt's mayor, Petra Roth, Deutsche Bahn CEO, Johannes Ludewig and the chairman of FAG, Wilhelm Bender.

About 300 employees were employed on the site. 400,000 m³ of soil was excavated and 100,000 m³ of concrete and 2.5 km of bored piles were installed for construction (including two kilometres of the line).

=== Cost and financing ===
Construction costs amounted to €225 million, including €44.5 million for the roof structure. The federal government's share was €97.5 million. FAG provided DM 257 million (as of 1998) for the check-in building, including the roof. The construction costs were DM 30 million above the original estimates. The causes of increase were unforeseen difficulties during construction, a fire and subsequent improvements in the level of services provided.

FAG donated the land and financed the development of all the infrastructure except for the immediate station area. Its costs incurred for the development of the terminal and the connections to the station together amounted to DM 170 million. Construction costs associated with the planned subsequent development amounted to €87 million. The costs of the immediate station area, amounting to DM 153 million, were funded by the federal government (two thirds) and Deutsche Bahn (one third).

=== Commissioning ===
At the end of November 1998, the first service operated as a works train with invited guests from Zeppelinheim station through the tunnel to the Frankfurt Airport long-distance station.

After several weeks of trial operation, the station was formally opened on 27 May 1999. Federal Transport Minister Franz Müntefering, Deutsche Bahn CEO Johannes Ludewig, and FAG Chairman Wilhelm Bender and other invited guests rode in an ICE T into the station. Lord Mayor, Petra Roth and the Hessian Minister of Transport, Dieter Posch attended the ceremony.

The first regular scheduled train ran from the train station on 30 May 1999 as Intercity 537 (Moritzburg) at 05:37 AM. Deutsche Bahn initially forecast five million passengers per year. After completion of the high-speed line to Cologne in 2002, this figure was expected to rise to nine million passengers annually. This corresponded to a quadrupling of the ridership previously measured at the regional station. A study from the 1990s expected that, in 2002, an additional 919,000 passengers would travel by train to the airport rather than by car or taxi and around 1.3 million arriving passengers would use rail instead of short-haul flights to the airport.

At the opening of the station there were initially two Intercity-Express and two Intercity services, each running every one or two hours through the new station. Initially 83 services operated through the station between 5:00 AM and 0:30 AM daily. Before the commissioning of the station had been completed, its opening was delayed by a major fire in the check-in area in November 1998.

The opening of the station quadrupled the capacity of the airport to handle long-distance trains, while the relocation of long-distance traffic to the long-distance station doubled capacity in the regional station for S-Bahn and regional traffic.

Following the opening of the long-distance station, the three-track station opened in 1972 (now the regional station) has only been used by regional and S-Bahn traffic. Between 1985 and 1999, the regional station had been used by Intercity and later by Intercity-Express services. Until December 2010 some long-distance trains used the regional station at night, when the long-distance station was closed. The long-distance station is now also open at night, so scheduled long-distance trains no longer stop at the regional station. The Cologne-Frankfurt high-speed line opened in August 2002, three years after the line between the Raunheim curve and the Frankfurt Cross tunnel through the new station.

In the spring of 2000, around 14,000 passengers per day were counted. In the first year of operation it was used by approximately 9,000 passengers per day. In 2008, about 22,500 used the station each day. Passenger forecasts in mid-1998 estimated that after the scheduled start of the new line, assumed to be in May 2001, there would be more than 30,000 incoming and outgoing ICE passengers per day. It was predicted that in the early 2000s about 30 percent of passengers would arrive at and leave the airport by rail. Prior to the opening of the station this rate (at the old station) was 14 percent.

After the opening of the station the removal of the glass dome in favour of further development was discussed on and off. This option was rejected for reasons of fire safety. The DM 14 million dome had already been integrated into the original plans for the building complex.

In 2003, the design of the building was awarded a special prize in the Renault Traffic Design Awards.

=== Development of "the Squaire" ===
On 1 March 2007, the foundation stone was laid for a controversial project called Frankfurt Airrail Centre to be built on a slab over the station. Meanwhile, the nine-storey complex with more than eight hectares of office space, 550–700 hotel rooms, restaurants and shops, which had been built at a cost around €660 million, was renamed the Squaire (a portmanteau word derived from the English words "square" and "air"). The glass dome has been retained in the centre and on each side is the foyer of the hotel and the connection to the office wing. The opening was originally scheduled for autumn 2009, but was delayed until early 2011. The complex was completed in the spring of 2011.

20 applicants had applied in 1998 to build the development at the station. After a pre-qualification phase a short list of seven investor groups were eventually invited to apply to carry it out. In March 1999, an international selection committee chose two companies to finally develop the project: e-Pfa-Immobilienmanagement (Wiesbaden) and TERCON Immobilien Projektentwicklungs GmbH (Munich). A feasibility study for the project estimated that the centre would create 3,400–4,000 new jobs.

== Operation ==
In 2026, the station was served by 15 Intercity-Express lines and one regional service.

Line	Route	Interval
ICE 1	Hamburg-Altona – Hamburg – Essen – Duisburg – Düsseldorf – Cologne – Bonn – Koblenz – Mainz – Frankfurt Airport – Frankfurt – Würzburg – Nuremberg – Regensburg – Passau	Two train pairs
ICE 11	Berlin Gesundbrunnen – Berlin – Erfurt – Frankfurt – Frankfurt Airport – Mannheim – Stuttgart – Ulm – Augsburg – Munich	One train pair at night
ICE 12	Frankfurt → Frankfurt Airport → Hanau → Hanover → Wolfsburg → Berlin → Berlin Ostbahnhof	One train
ICE 13	Frankfurt Airport – Frankfurt South – Kassel – Braunschweig – Wolfsburg – Berlin – Berlin Ostbahnhof	Every four hours
ICE/ECE 20	Hamburg – Hannover – Göttingen – Kassel-Wilhelmshöhe – Frankfurt – Frankfurt Airport – Mainz – Wiesbaden	One train pair
ICE 41	(Dortmund – Bochum –) Essen – Duisburg – Düsseldorf – Köln Messe/Deutz – Frankfurt Airport – Frankfurt – Würzburg – Nuremberg – Munich	Hourly
ICE 42	(Münster –) Dortmund – Bochum – Essen – Duisburg – Düsseldorf – Cologne – Siegburg/Bonn – Frankfurt Airport – Mannheim – Stuttgart – Augsburg – Munich	Every two hours
ICE 43	Hamburg-Altona – Dortmund – Hagen – Wuppertal – Solingen – Cologne – Frankfurt Airport – Mannheim – Karlsruhe – Freiburg – Basel	Every two hours
ICE 47	Münster/Dortmund – Bochum – Essen – Duisburg – Düsseldorf – Köln Messe/Deutz – Frankfurt Airport – Mannheim – Stuttgart	Every two hours
ICE 49	Cologne – (Cologne/Bonn Airport –) Siegburg/Bonn – Montabaur – Limburg Süd – Frankfurt Airport – Frankfurt	Some trains
ICE 50	Dresden – Leipzig – Erfurt – Fulda – Frankfurt – Frankfurt Airport – Mainz – Wiesbaden	Every two hours
ICE 62	Münster – Wanne-Eickel – Gelsenkirchen – Essen – Duisburg – Düsseldorf – Köln Messe/Deutz – Frankfurt Airport – Mannheim – Stuttgart – Ulm – Augsburg – Munich – Salzburg – Villach – Klagenfurt – Graz	1 train pair
ICE 62	Dortmund – Bochum – Essen – Duisburg – Düsseldorf – Köln Messe/Deutz – Frankfurt Airport– Mannheim – Heidelberg – Stuttgart – Ulm – Friedrichshafen Stadt – Lindau-Reutin – Bregenz – St. Anton – Innsbruck	1 train pair
ICE 78	Amsterdam – Arnhem – Duisburg – Düsseldorf – Cologne – Frankfurt Airport – Frankfurt	Every two hours
ICE 79	Brussels – Liège – Aachen – Cologne – Frankfurt Airport – Frankfurt	Every two hours
ICE 91	Dortmund – (Essen – Düsseldorf –)/(Hagen – Wuppertal –) Cologne – Bonn – Koblenz – Mainz – Frankfurt Airport – Frankfurt – Würzburg – Nuremberg – Regensburg – Passau – Linz – Vienna	Every two hours
RB 58	Rüsselsheim Opelwerk – Frankfurt Airport – Frankfurt Süd – Maintal Ost – Hanau – Aschaffenburg – Laufach	Hourly

In 2009, 16 percent of passengers at Frankfurt Airport travelled by Intercity-Express.

== See also ==
- Rail transport in Germany
