= Montabaur station =

Railway station in Montabaur, Germany

Montabaur
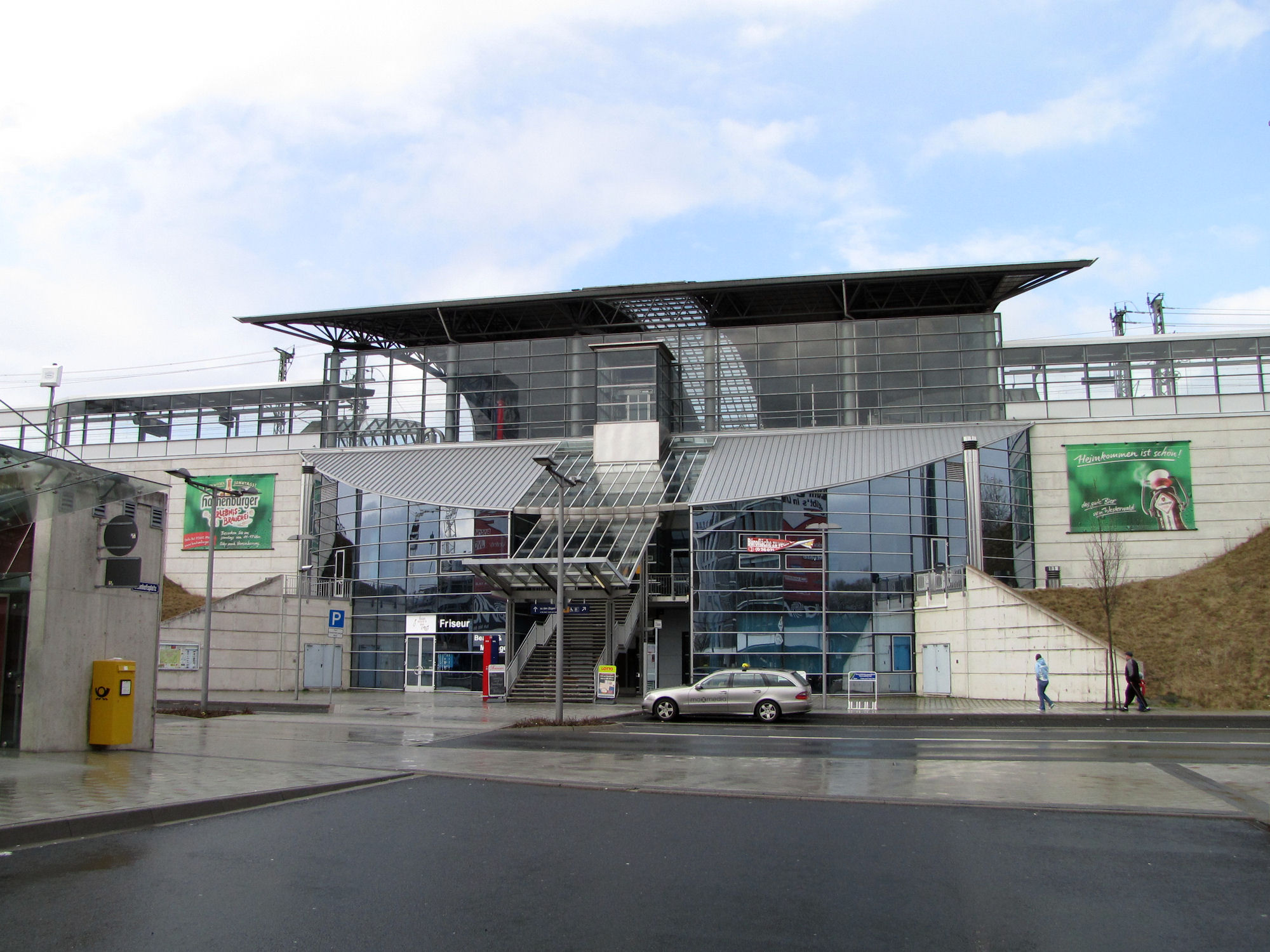
- Montabaur station

General information
- Location: Staudter Str. 1, Montabaur, Rhineland-Palatinate; Germany
- Coordinates: 50°26′41″N 7°49′31″E
- Owner: Deutsche Bahn
- Operator: DB Netz; DB Station&Service
- Lines: Cologne-Frankfurt high-speed rail line (89.1 km) (KBS 472); Lower Westerwald Railway (21.8 km) (KBS 629); Herborn–Montabaur (73.48 km) (closed)
- Platforms: 3

Construction
- Accessible: Yes
- Architect: Architekturbüro; Jux und Partner, Darmstadt

Other information
- Station code: 4169
- DS100 code: FMT (long-distance section); FMTN (regional section)
- IBNR: 00667
- Category: 4
- Fare zone: VRM: 412
- Website: www.bahnhof.de

History
- Opened: 10 July 2000 (regional); 27 July 2002 (long-distance)

Services
Preceding station	DB Fernverkehr	Following station
Köln Messe/Deutz towards Dortmund Hbf or Köln Hbf	ICE 41	Limburg Süd towards München Hbf
Siegburg/Bonn towards Dortmund Hbf or Köln Hbf	ICE 45	Limburg Süd towards Mainz Hbf or Stuttgart Hbf
Siegburg/Bonn towards Köln Hbf	ICE 49	Limburg Süd towards Frankfurt (Main) Hbf
Siegburg/Bonn towards Brussels-South	ICE 79	Limburg Süd towards Frankfurt (Main) Hbf
Preceding station	Hessische Landesbahn	Following station
Dernbach (Westerwald) towards Siershahn	RB 29	Goldhausen towards Limburg (Lahn)
Location

Montabaur station is a station at the 89.1 kilometre point of the Cologne-Frankfurt high-speed railway, the Limburg–Siershahn railway (Lower Westerwald Railway) and the closed Herborn–Montabaur railway (Cross Westerwald Railway) in the German state of Rhineland-Palatinate. The station, which is served by regional and long-distance passenger services as well as freight traffic, is on the outskirts of the town of Montabaur. It is aligned parallel with Autobahn 3 (A3), which runs immediately to the north.

The construction costs amounted to €23.6 million.

== Station infrastructure ==
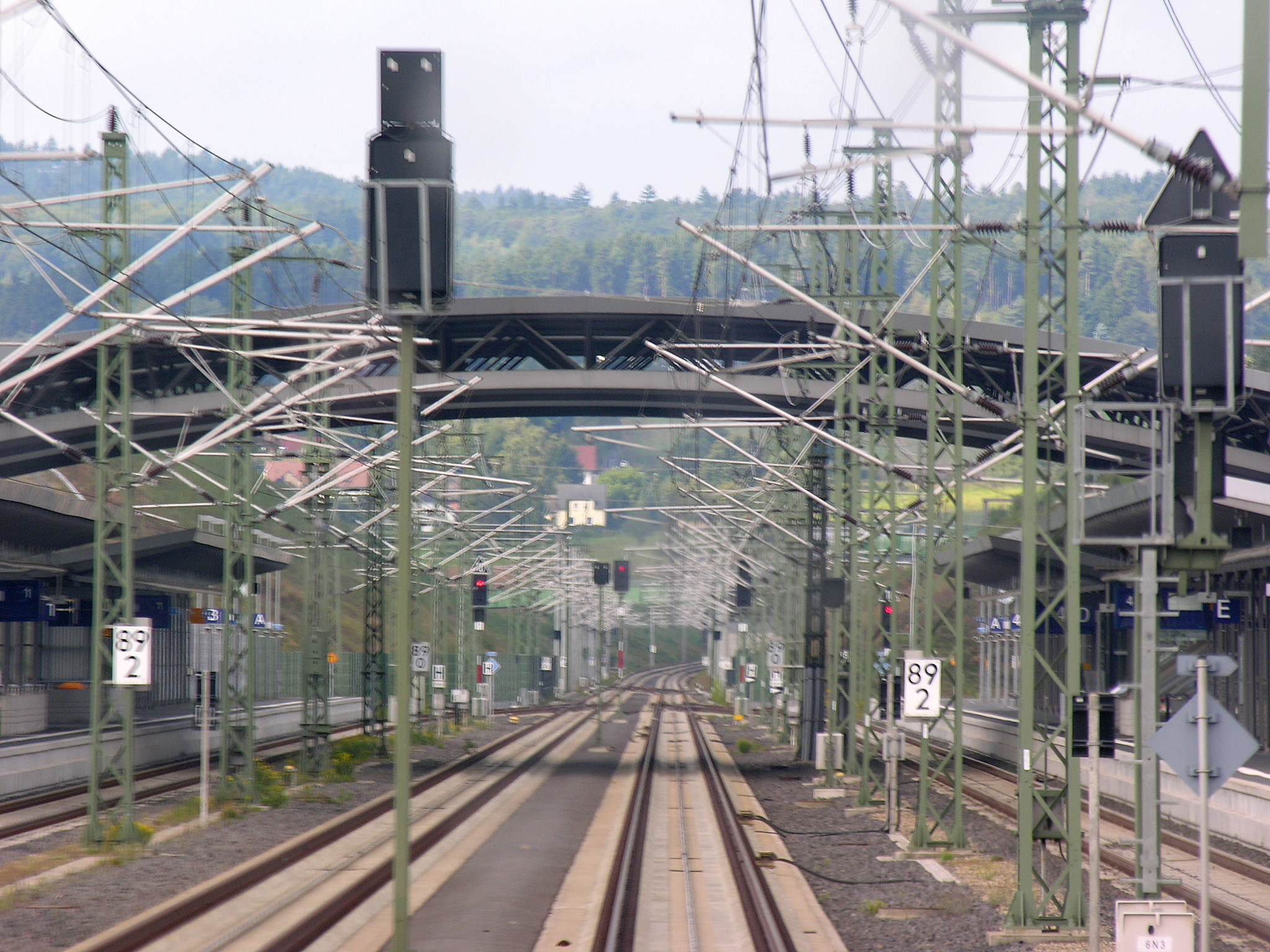
Perspective from the cab of an ICE running north through the station without stopping (2005)

The new line runs through the area of the station on a roughly 15 metre-high embankment. The station's tracks are divided into an area for high-speed line operations (with the German operating points code of FMT) and an area serving regional operations on the Lower Westerwald Railway (operating points abbreviation FMTN). There is only an indirect connection between the two parts: the eastern catch point from the northern Intercity-Express (ICE) platform track (4), has a connection to platform track 5 (the regional platform); this involves a reversal.

Five tracks are available for passenger transport. Next to track 1 and between tracks 4 and 5, there are two 405 m long and 76 cm high platforms, which both have a 200-metre-long section under cover. The platform face on track 5 is divided into platform 5a to the west and 5b to the east, with mid-platform exit tracks that cross, permitting trains to run in both directions. Track 5 is used exclusively by regional trains and tracks 1–4 are only used by ICEs. Tracks 2 and 3 are the main tracks used by non-stopping trains on the high-speed line. In addition, there are seven tracks available for freight.

The tracks are elevated and are crossed by an underpass between the platforms. A two-storey station building was built at the side facing towards the town. The main entrance to the station on the southern side is accessed by a staircase and a lift, while the passage to the northern entrance hall is at ground level. Information and emergency call boxes are installed at both entrances.

The circulatory area houses a Deutsche Bahn travel centre with two ticket offices, toilets, a waiting room and lockers. In other commercial areas there is a snackbar, a drugstore, a barbershop and an ATM of the Sparkasse Westerwald (savings bank). In addition, there is the so-called Schaufenster der Region ("showcase of the region") with presentations of local companies and an information office of the town. A total of 700 m^{2} was created for marketing areas. The station hall and the station forecourt are covered by a Wi-Fi hotspot.

An underpass is connected by two escalators, stairs and a lift to give access to both platforms. There is also a telephone box for information and emergencies as well as seating. The platform for tracks 4 and 5 features a lounge for platform service employees. The station basement also houses a Federal Police station, located behind the main staircase. The station building is closed at night from 0:45 to 4:10.

The station has a Park and ride parking lot as well.

Montabaur station is one of four stations in Germany, along with Limburg Süd, also located on the Cologne–Frankfurt high-speed railway, and Allersberg (Rothsee) and Kinding (Altmühltal) on the Nuremberg–Munich high-speed railway, which are planned to be passed at 300 km/h.

West of the station, at kilometer 87.1, is the eastern end of the Dernbach tunnel, and to the east of the station is the Himmelberg tunnel.

== Operations ==
The 2007 timetable (commencing on 10 December 2006) included around 80 trains stopping in Montabaur on each working day:

- 15 trains operate on weekdays from platform 1 towards Frankfurt (Frankfurt Airport and Frankfurt Central Station). The travel time over the approximately 80 to 90 km of line is about 30 to 40 minutes.
- Two daily trains also run to Wiesbaden (77 km) from platform 1 in 30 minutes.
- 22 trains run from platform 4 towards Cologne. Most ICEs require about 30 to 40 minutes to cover the approximately 90 km of track.
- Trains are operated by DreiLänderBahn from platform 5a to Limburg (Lahn) station in about 45 minutes. Twelve pairs of trains operate each way on weekdays and six pairs operate on Saturdays, Sundays and public holidays.
- The DreiLänderBahn trains take about 17 minutes to run in the opposite direction to Siershahn from platform 5b.

The ICE services (38 trains on weekdays) take nine minutes to cover the 21.4 rail km to Limburg Süd station. Critics call this connection, which is authorised to operate at speeds of up to 300 km/h, the "fastest S-Bahn in the world".

The station is conveniently located near the Montabaur junction (No. 40) of autobahn 3. 350 park-and-ride parking spaces were available at its opening. This number had grown to 900 by August 2006 and another 130 paid parking spaces are under the bus station.

Three taxi stands have been established at the station. 15 bus routes operate from the adjacent bus station, including a free passenger shuttle bus for the ICE services, which runs to about two km south of the district town centre.

The Zweckverband SPNV Nord plans a reactivation of the Engers-Au railway, which is named Brexbachtalbahn (Brexbach Valley railway) between Engers and Siershahn station and train service from Neuwied via Bendorf, Grenzau, Ransbach-Baumbach, Siershahn, Wirges and Dernbach to Montabaur station.

Fright transport on the Cross Westerwald Railway, nowadays takes place only on the section from Montabaur to Wallmerod, the section from Wallmerod via Westerburg and Renenrod to Herborn is out of service and partly deconstructed. Touristic railbike service on the Fehl-Ritzhausen - Rennerod section, organized by the interest group IG Westerwald-Querbahn e. V. (IWQ), IWQ also organized touristic special train rides on the Montabaur - Wallmerod section in 2005, 2006, 2007 and 2010.

=== Long-distance and regional transport ===
In the 2026 timetable the following services stopped at the station:

Line	Route	Frequency
ICE 41	(Dortmund – Essen –) Cologne or Köln Messe/Deutz – Montabaur – Frankfurt Airport – Frankfurt Hbf – Würzburg – Nuremberg Hbf – Munich Hbf	Some trains
ICE 45	(Dortmund – Köln Messe/Deutz –) / Cologne Hbf – Cologne/Bonn Airport – Montabaur – Limburg Süd – Wiesbaden – Mainz (– Mannheim – Heidelberg – Vaihingen (Enz) – Stuttgart)	Some trains
ICE 49	(Dortmund – Wuppertal – Köln Messe/Deutz –) / (Köln Hbf –) Siegburg/Bonn – Montabaur – Limburg Süd – Frankfurt Airport – Frankfurt Hbf	Some trains
ICE 79	Brussels – Aachen – Cologne – Siegburg/Bonn – Montabaur – Frankfurt Airport – Frankfurt (Main) Hbf	Some trains
RB 29	Limburg – Elz (Kr Limburg/Lahn) Süd – Montabaur – Siershahn	Every 2 hours

=== Rail infrastructure ===
The tracks run on an embankment at a height of 14 metres in an east–west direction, parallel to the A 3, which runs immediately to the north. The through tracks, 2 and 3, run on slab track with UIC-60 (60 kg/m) rails. The three platform tracks and the freight tracks, however, run on ballast. All four long-distance tracks (1–4) are equipped with the Linienzugbeeinflussung automatic train protection system.

East and west of the station are sets of points leading to the platform tracks. Operations over the points toward the platform tracks can be run at 100 km/h. The main through tracks are protected by catch points against side-on collisions from trains running from the platform tracks.

Near the station is one of five electric sub-stations on the high-speed line as well as a sub-centre of the electronic interlocking system, which is controlled by the electronic control centre in Frankfurt am Main. The sub-centre controls the high-speed line from the Idstein crossover to the approach to Siegburg/Bonn station and monitors and controls the Limburg-Staffel–Siershahn railway in the vicinity of Montabaur station. Transfer of control of the whole Limburg-Staffel–Siershahn line to the interlocking is planned.

=== Criticism ===
The stations of Limburg Süd and Montabaur, which are approximately 20 kilometres (12 mi) apart, have been criticised in the past as being the result of political blackmail. After Limburg Süd station had already been agreed in the late 1980s, Rhineland-Palatinate had demanded a station in Montabaur before it would allow a smooth approval process for the new line. Federalism in Germany grants the states of Germany mostly powers to delay federal infrastructure projects but few powers to build infrastructure on their own, so the state arguably had little other recourse to force the federal government to construct an ICE station in their state.

== Transport association ==
Verkehrsverbund Rhein-Mosel

Due to the location in the Westerwald district, Montabaur station is loctaed in the area of the transport association Verkehrsverbund Rhein-Mosel (VRM), the VRM fare applies for local train amd local bus rides.
