= Marienthal Friary (Westerwald) =

German monastery

Coordinates: 50.736352°N 7.671301°E

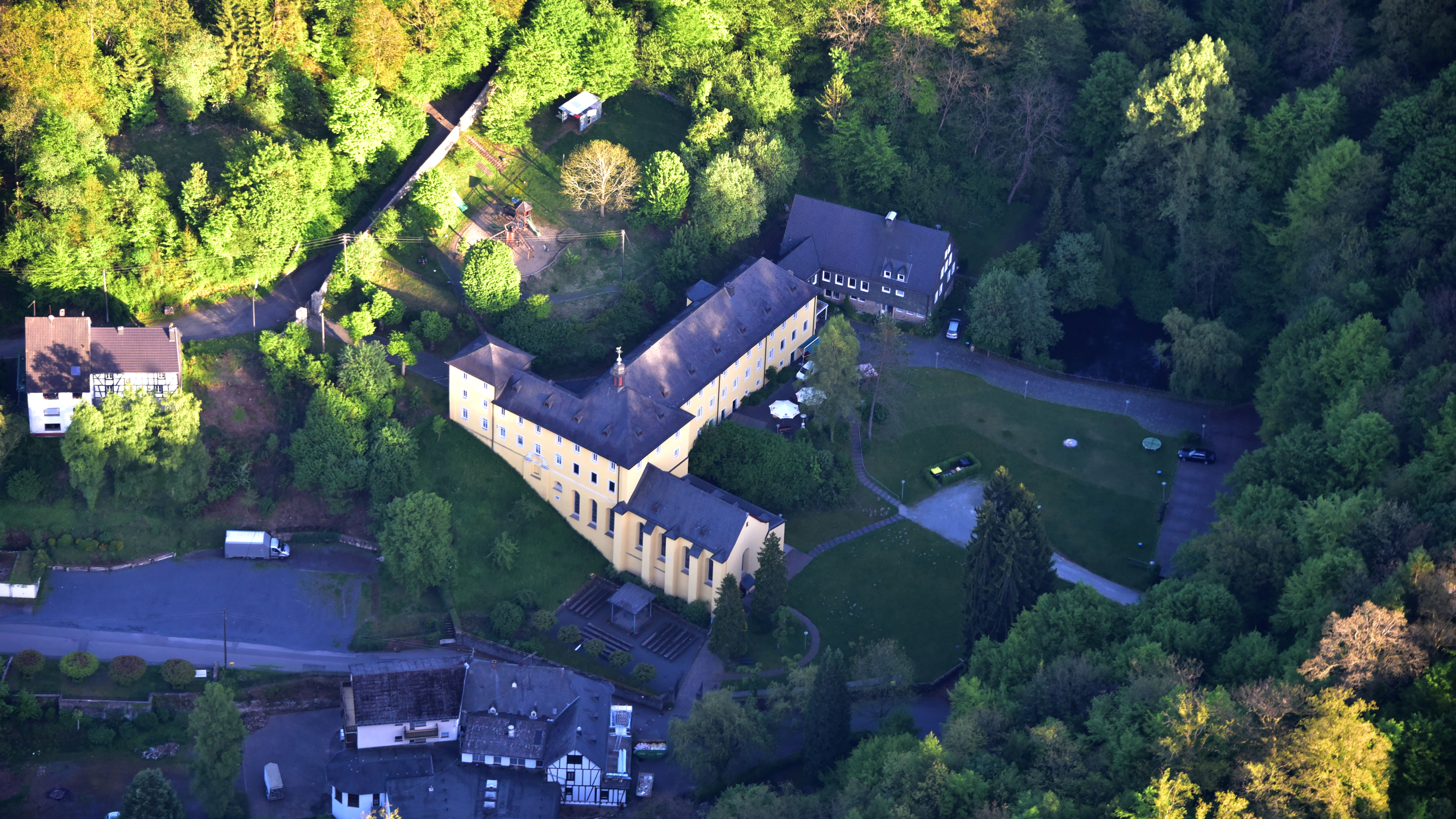
Marienthal Friary (Westerwald), 2017 aerial photograph

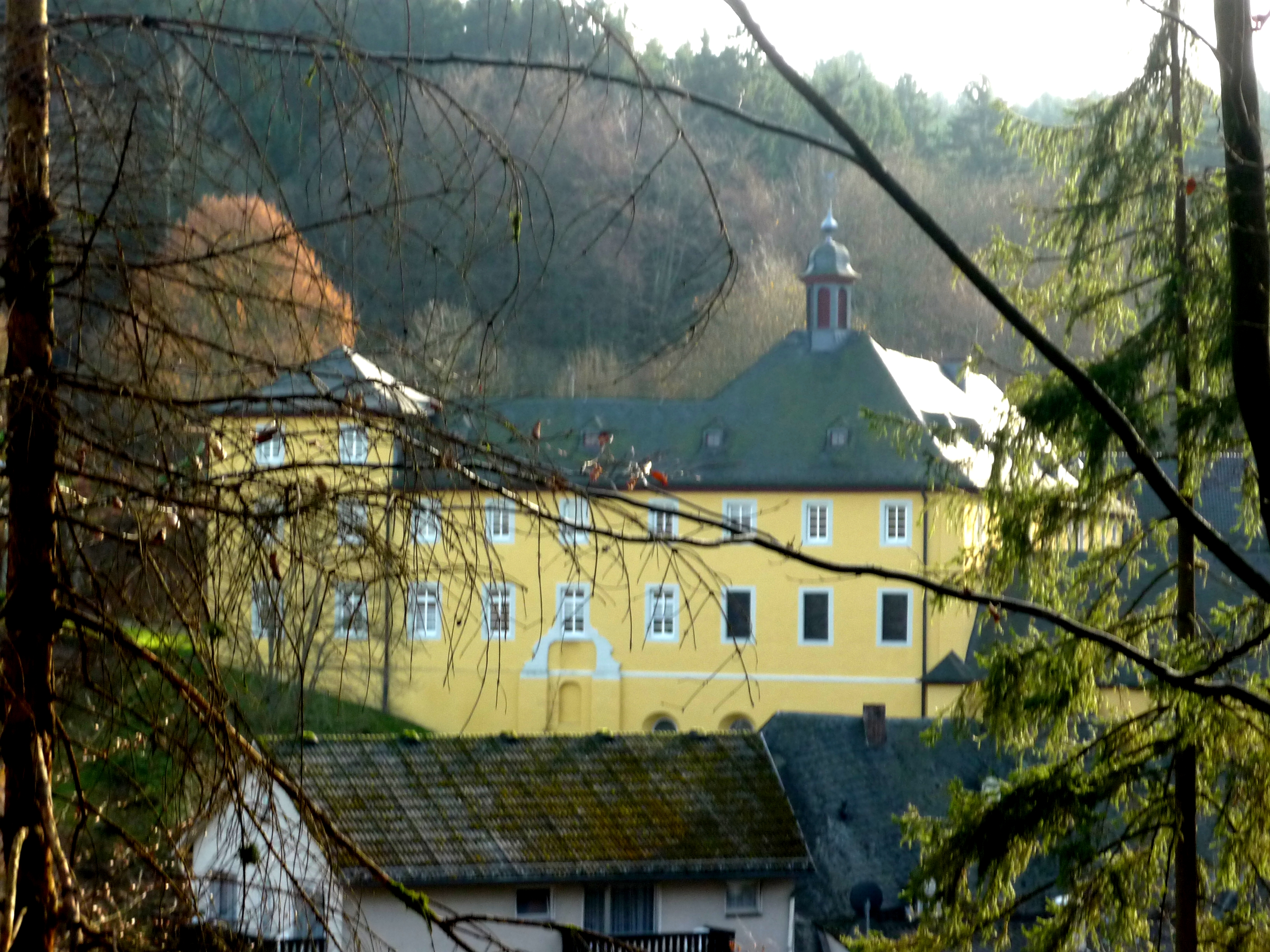
The former Franciscan friary now houses a café.

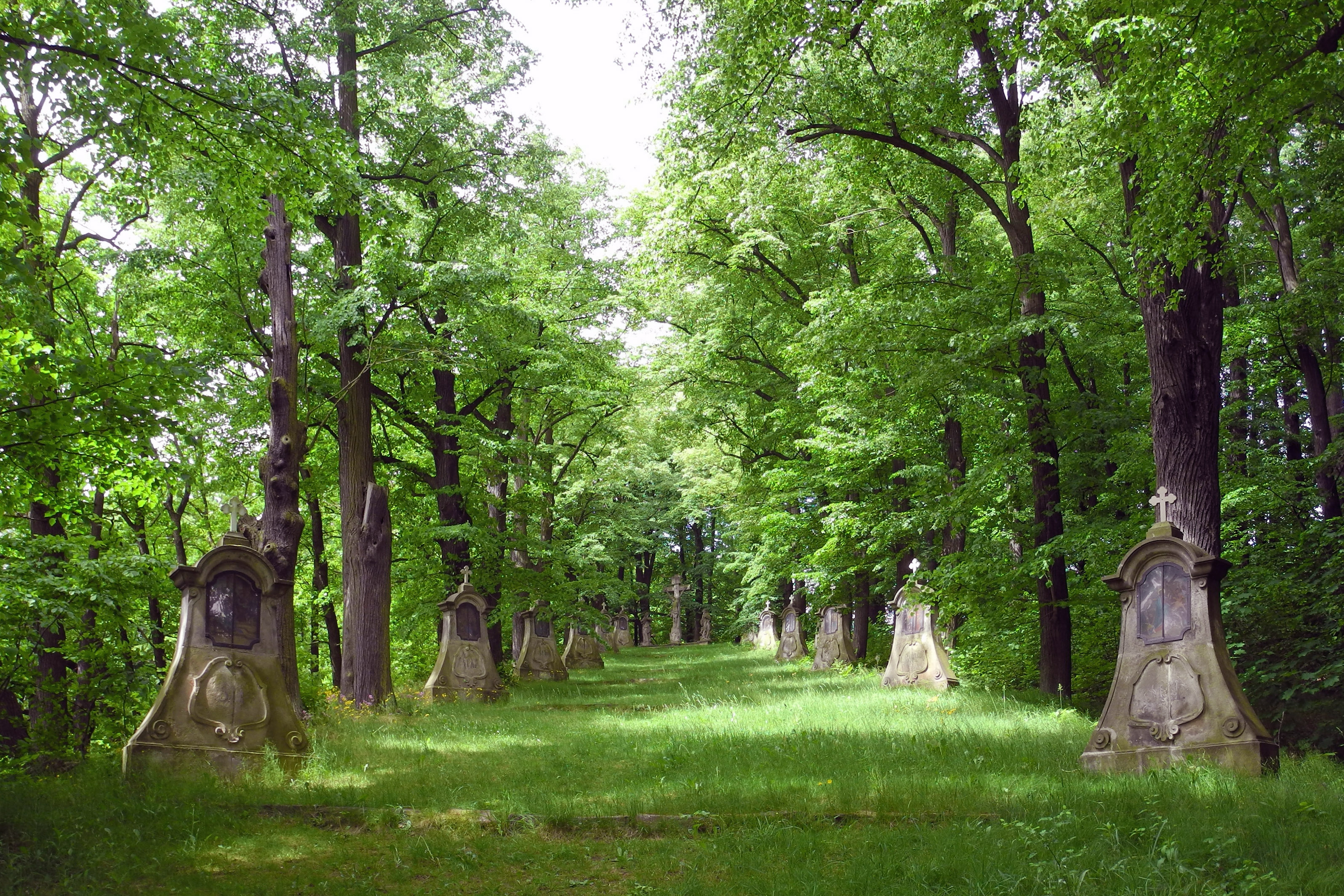
Marienthaler Kreuzweg around Marienthal Friary

Marienthal Friary (German: Kloster Marienthal) is a former Franciscan friary in the Westerwald in the modern district of Altenkirchen, Rhineland-Palatinate, Germany. Marienthal itself is a small village in the municipality of Seelbach bei Hamm (Sieg), which had a population of 55 residents on 30 June 2011.

The chapel is still in use for regular worship. An attraction in the grounds is the grotto of Marienthal. The Kreuzweg (cross way) is a hiking trail on the area around the former friary.

The official address is Am Kloster 15.

== Transport links ==
The train stop Kloster Marienthal is located on the Engers–Au railway and served by line RB90 (Limburg (Lahn) - Diez Ost - Westerburg - Nistertal-Bad Marienberg - Hachenburg - Altenkirchen - Au (Sieg) - Betzdorf (Sieg) - Siegen Hbf) of DreiLänderBahn, a section of Hessische Landesbahn (HLB) and located on the area of the transport association Verkehrsverbund Rhein-Mosel (VRM), zone no. 912.

The local bus line 288 runs from Au (Sieg) station via Hamm, Marienthal and Hilgenroth to Breitscheidt.

The K51 road connects Marienthal to Hamm (Sieg)

The Marienwanderweg hiking trail connects Marienthal to Marienstatt Abbey, an active monastery of the Cistercians which is located in Streithausen close to Hachenburg.

The closure of the Kloster Marienthal rail stop, which is located on the ground of Hilgenroth, was discussed several times because it no longer met the safety requirements of the Federal Railway Authority and only carried eight passengers per week. In 2017, a support organisation named Klosterdorf Marienthal (Marienthal Friary Village) was founded, led by Uwe Steiniger from Klostergastronomie Marienthal, Pastor Frank Aumüller and Dietmar Schumacher from the local SPD club in the municipality of Altenkirchen-Flammersfeld. This support organisation also started an online petition to preserve the train stop and gathered 2,500 votes.

== Literature ==
- Andachtsbüchlein für Pilger zum Gnadenort Marienthal nebst einer gedrängten Geschichte der Kirche des Klosters u. des Gnadenbildes : Maria, du schmerzhafte Mutter, ... bitt für uns!; mit e. Stahlstich. - Linz a. Rh. : Krumscheid, nicht vor 1853. digitalised publication of the University and State Library Düsseldorf
- Jakob Wirtz: Fünfhundert Jahre Marienthal bei Hamm an der Sieg. 2nd edition, Werl, 1928.
- Gabriel Busch (ed.): Hilgenroth/Marienthal. Zwei Wallfahrtsorte, Siegburg, 1982.
- Daniel Schneider: Die Entwicklung der Konfessionen in der Grafschaft Sayn im Grundriss, in: Heimat-Jahrbuch des Kreises Altenkirchen 58 (2015), pp. 74–80.
- Daniel Schneider: Die Geschichte der Ortsgemeinde Obererbach (Westerwald). Die Ortschaften Hacksen, Niedererbach, Obererbach und Koberstein vom Mittelalter bis zur Gegenwart. Obererbach, 2009, ISBN 978-3-00-027494-7 (2 Bände, mit zahlreichen Bezügen zu Marienthal).

== See also ==
- List of Christian monasteries in Rhineland-Palatinate
- List of Christian monasteries in Germany
