= Karl Friedrich Freiherr von Schorlemer =

German nobleman and politician (1886–1936)

Reichstag Deputy
- In office 12 November 1933 – 27 September 1936

Reichstag Deputy
- In office 6 November 1932 – 12 November 1933

Alderman, Waldbröl
- In office 1930 – 27 September 1936

Honorary Bürgermeister, Morsbach
- In office 1920–1927

Personal details
- Born: 23 March 1886 Rödelheim, Kingdom of Prussia, German Empire
- Died: 27 September 1936 (aged 50) Wissen, Nazi Germany
- Party: German National People's Party
- Education: University of Lausanne; University of Münster; University of Bonn; Ludwig-Maximilians-Universität München; University of Göttingen
- Occupation: Estate manager
- Profession: Lawyer

Military service
- Allegiance: German Empire
- Branch/service: Royal Prussian Army
- Years of service: 1914–1918
- Rank: Oberleutnant
- Unit: 22nd Field Artillery Regiment (2nd Westphalian)
- Commands: 5th Battery
- Battles/wars: World War I
- Awards: Iron Cross, 1st and 2nd class

Karl Friedrich Freiherr von Schorlemer (23 March 1886 – 27 September 1936) was a German nobleman, landowner, lawyer, and politician in the German National People's Party. He served as a deputy in the Reichstag during the Weimar Republic and Nazi Germany.

== Family, education and war service ==
Schorlemer was born in 1886 at Rödelheim (now part of Frankfurt) to an old Westphalian aristocratic landowning family. He attended a private elementary school in Wissen as well as the Stella Matutina, a private Jesuit secondary school in Feldkirch, and the Gymnasium in Bedburg. He then studied law at the University of Lausanne, the University of Münster, the University of Bonn, the Ludwig-Maximilians-Universität München, and the University of Göttingen. While still completing his studies, Schorlemer fulfilled his compulsory military service with the Royal Prussian Army in Field Artillery Regiment No. 22 (2nd Westphalian), headquartered in Münster. In 1913, he became a judicial trainee in Wiehl. From 1914 to 1918, Schorlemer took part in the First World War as a member of his former regiment. During the war, Schorlemer was promoted to Oberleutnant, commanded the 5th battery of his regiment from 1917 to 1918, and was awarded both classes of the Iron Cross.

== Political career ==
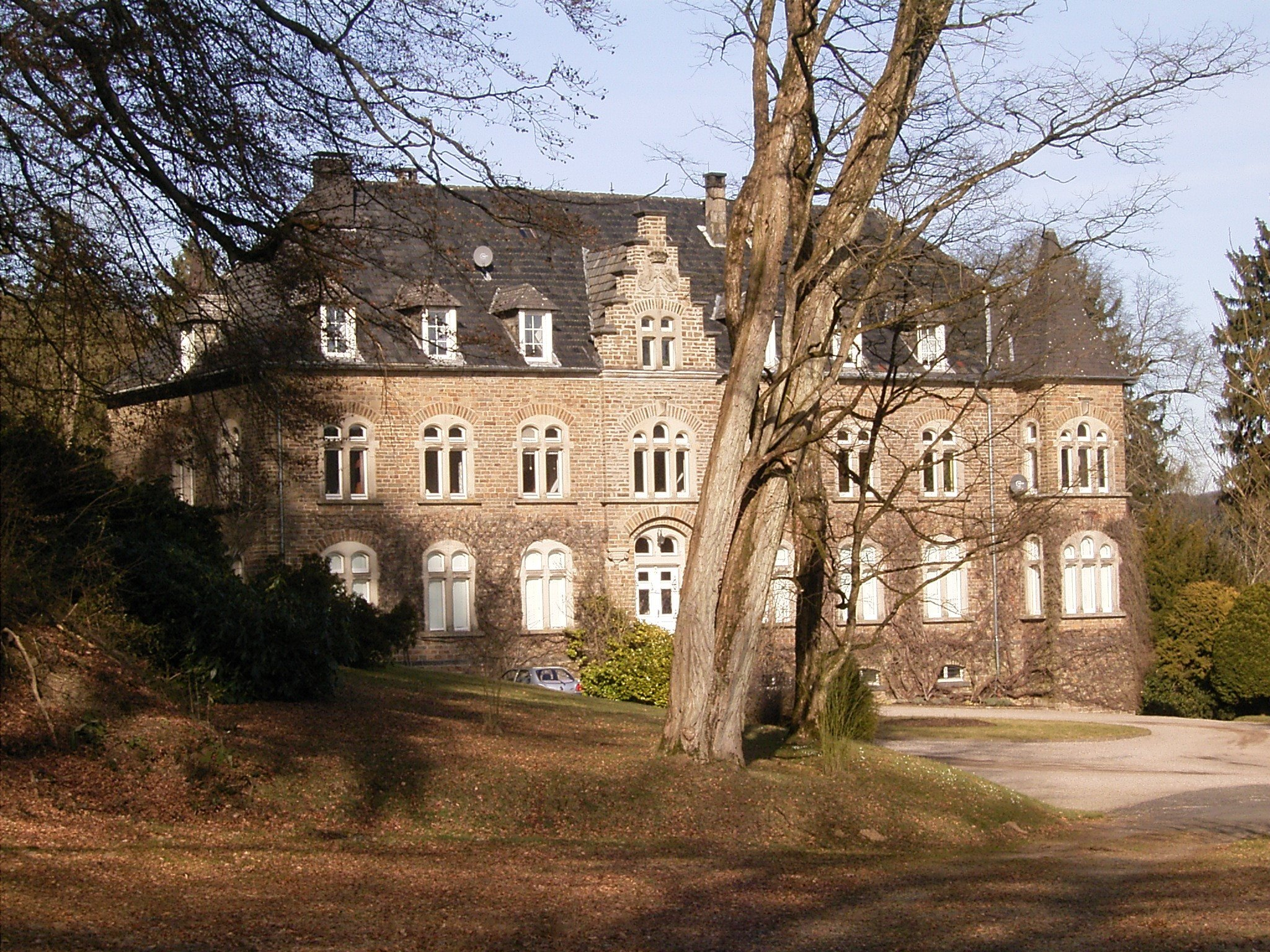
Volperhausen Castle, the Schorlemer manor house in Morsbach

After the war, Schorlemer took over the management of his parents' Volperhausen estate near Morsbach. He also became increasingly politically active during the Weimar Republic. He joined the conservative German National People's Party (DNVP) and served as honorary Bürgermeister of Morsbach from 1920 to 1927. He also served as an alderman in Waldbröl from 1930.

Schorlemer was elected to the Reichstag as a DNVP deputy for electoral constituency 20 (Cologne–Aachen) at the 6 November 1932 election, and was reelected at the 5 March 1933 election. Later that month, along with the other members of the DNVP parliamentary group, he voted for the Enabling Act, which granted the government of Adolf Hitler the authority to enact laws without submitting them to the Reichstag, a key element in the establishment of the Nazi dictatorship. After the dissolution of the DNVP in June 1933, Schorlemer again was returned to the Reichstag at the election of 12 November 1933 as a "guest" of the Nazi Party faction. Elected for a final time at the 29 March 1936 election, he remained a member until his death in September 1936.

Schorlemer was a member of the Nazi paramilitary unit, the Sturmabteilung (SA), and attained the rank SA-Oberführer. He was in the inner circle of SA-Stabschef Ernst Röhm, who appointed him as the chief of staff of SA-Gruppe Westfalen, and then chief of staff of SA-Obergruppe III at Koblenz. After Röhm's murder in the Night of the Long Knives on 1 July 1934, Schorlemer was arrested by the Gestapo but proceedings against him were dismissed in 1935.

== Sources ==
- Information about Karl Friedrich Freiherr von Schorlemer in the Reichstag database
- Domanus, Max (1998). Hitler Reden, Schriften, Anordnungen, Februar 1925 Bis Januar 1933. Vol. V. Munich: K.G. Saur Verlag. ISBN 3-598-21930-X.
