= Hilgenroth =

- Municipality
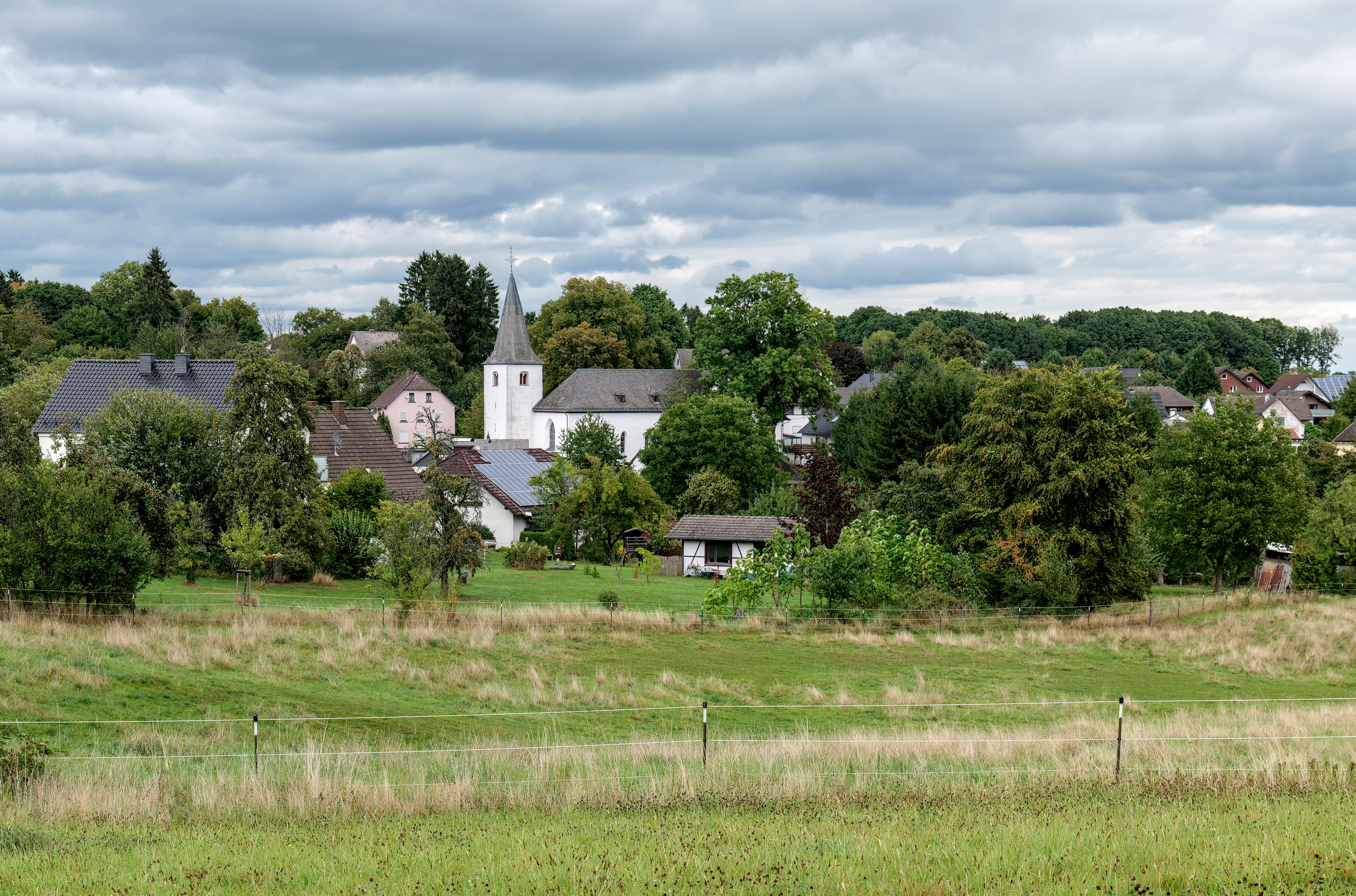

- Location of Hilgenroth within Altenkirchen district
- Interactive map of Hilgenroth
- Location within Germany Location within Rhineland-Palatinate
- Coordinates: 50°44′10″N 7°39′2″E
- Country: Germany
- State: Rhineland-Palatinate
- District: Altenkirchen
- Municipal assoc.: Altenkirchen-Flammersfeld

Government
  - Mayor (2024–29): Michael Rüttger

Area
  - Total: 2.96 km^{2} (1.14 sq mi)
- Elevation: 285 m (935 ft)

Population (2025-12-31)
  - Total: 305
  - Density: 103/km^{2} (267/sq mi)
- Time zone: UTC+01:00 (CET)
  - Summer (DST): UTC+02:00 (CEST)
- Postal codes: 57612
- Dialling codes: 02682
- Vehicle registration: AK
- Website: gemeinde-hilgenroth.de

Hilgenroth is a village in the municipality of Altenkirchen-Flammersfeld in the district of Altenkirchen, in Rhineland-Palatinate, in western Germany.

== Culture and sights ==
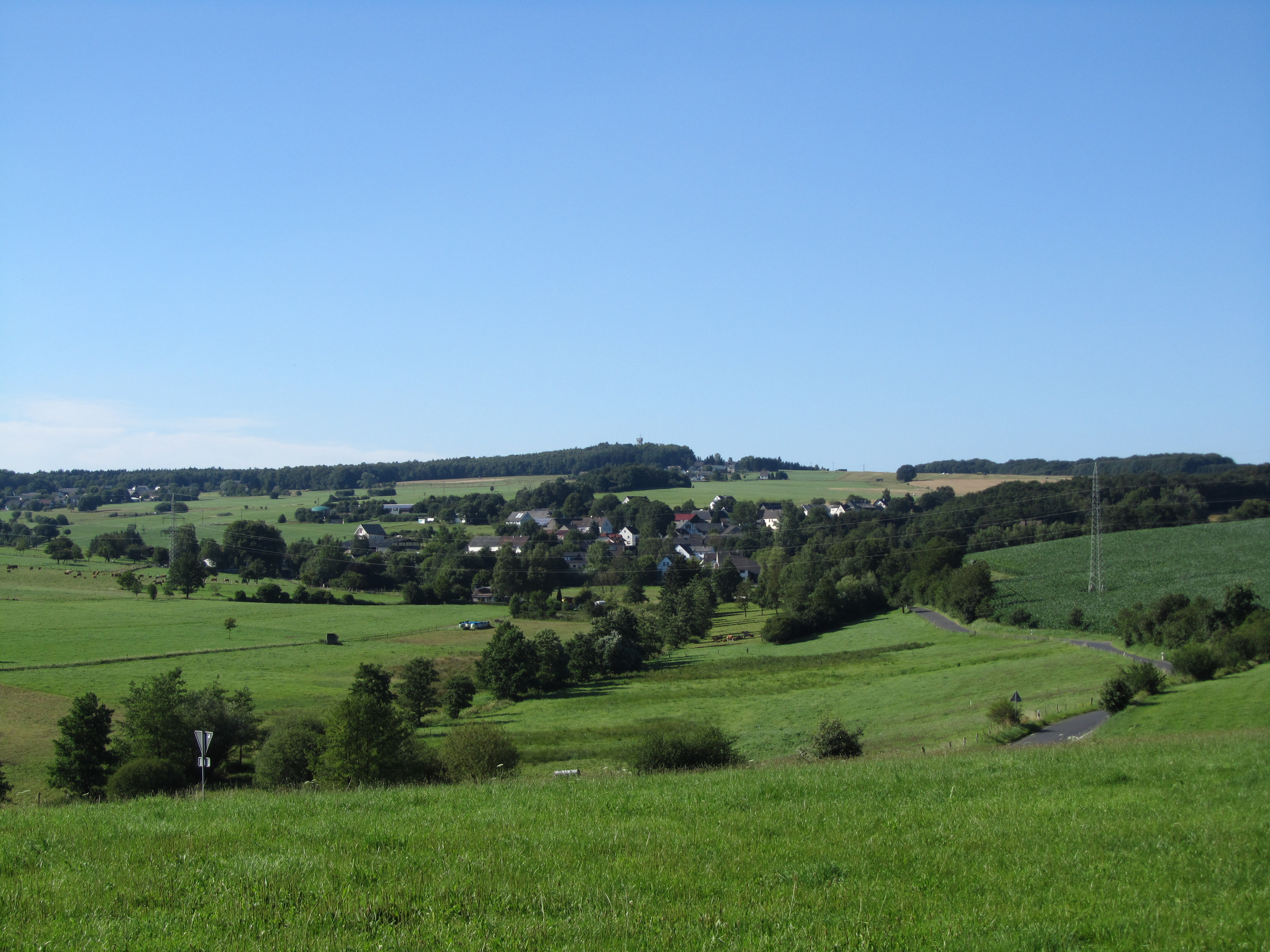
The Beulskopf

The Raiffeisen tower on the hill named Beulskopf overlooks the area and is frequently visited as a scenic destination.

== Clubs ==
Common clubs in Hilgenroth are the soccer club FFC Hilgenroth, the choirs MGV Hilgenroth 1866 and Frauenchor as well as the carnival club Könichreich Hilgenroth.

== Transport ==
The nearest train stop is Kloster Marienthal at the Engers-Au railway, served by line RB90 (Limburg - Diez Ost - Westerburg - Nistertal-Bad Marienberg - Hachenburg - Altenkirchen - Au (Sieg) - Wissen - Kirchen (Sieg) - Siegen Hbf), operated by RB90 of DreiLänderBahn, a section of Hessische Landesbahn (HLB)

The local bus line 288 connects Hilgenroth with Au (Sieg), Hamm, Marienthal and Breitscheidt.

Hilgenroth is located in the transport association VRM, in the zone number 913.

Hilgenroth is located on Westerwaldsteig, a long distance walking path from Herborn via Rennerod, Westerburg, Bad Marienberg and Hachenburg to Bad Hönningen as well as at the Marienwanderweg, a walking path leading from Marienstatt Abbey in Streithausen to Marienthal Abbey (Westerwald).

The Kloster Marienthal stop, which is located in Hilgenroth, but named and primarily used of visitors and residents of the district Marienthal (a pilgrimage site and that also hosts the former Franciscan monastery) of the village Seelbach (near Hamm (Sieg)), was several times in danger of being closed, because challenges to beet the trains in direction of Cologne at Au (Siege) station, but still wait for the trains coming from Frankfurt (Main) in Limburg (Lahn) station. Many trains stations along the line RB90 like Hattert, Unnau-Korb and Frickhofen, have been changed to stops without crossing possibility. Also in 2017 many people became active against the closure of the closure of the Kloster Marienthal stop, even a support organisation named Klosterdorf Marienthal (Marienthal Monastery Village), has been founded, leaders were Uwe Steiniger from Klostergastronomie Marienthal (Marienthal Monastery Gastronomy), Pastor Frank Aumüller and Dietmar Schumacher from the local club of SPD in the municipality of Altenkirchen-Flammersfeld. This support organisation also started an online petition to preserve the train stop and gathered 2,500 votes.
