= Seelbach bei Hamm =

- Municipality
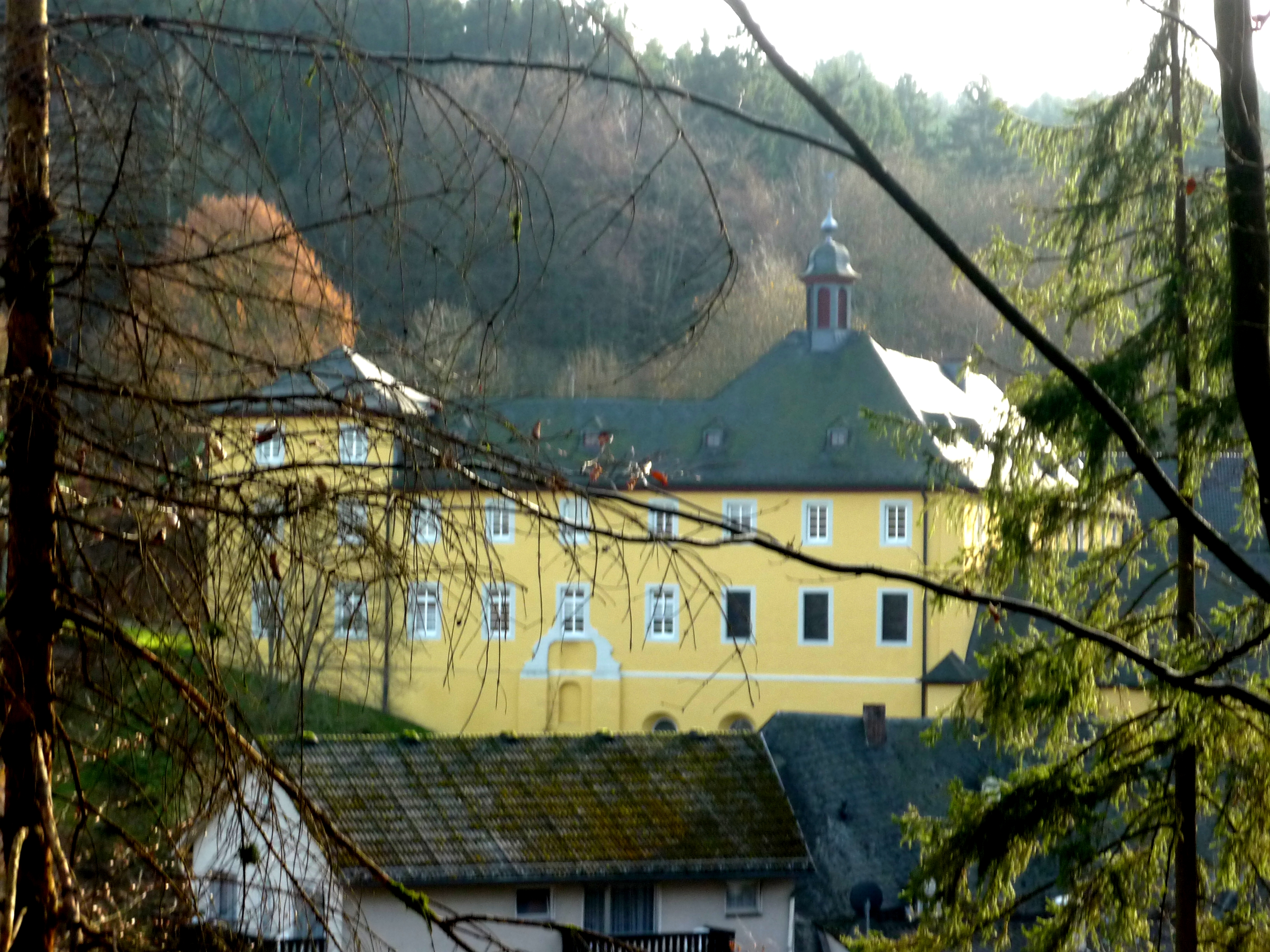
- Marienthal Abbey

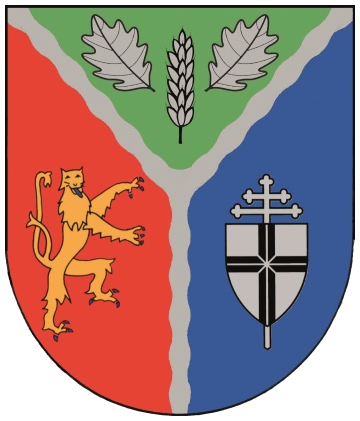
- Coat of arms

- Location of Seelbach bei Hamm within Altenkirchen district
- Interactive map of Seelbach bei Hamm
- Location within Germany Location within Rhineland-Palatinate
- Coordinates: 50°45′22″N 7°41′36″E
- Country: Germany
- State: Rhineland-Palatinate
- District: Altenkirchen
- Municipal assoc.: Hamm (Sieg)
- Subdivisions: 3

Government
  - Mayor (2019–24): Wolfgang Schumacher

Area
  - Total: 3.41 km^{2} (1.32 sq mi)
- Elevation: 195 m (640 ft)

Population (2025-12-31)
  - Total: 134
  - Density: 39.3/km^{2} (102/sq mi)
- Time zone: UTC+01:00 (CET)
  - Summer (DST): UTC+02:00 (CEST)
- Postal codes: 57577
- Dialling codes: 02682
- Vehicle registration: AK
- Website: www.hamm-sieg.de

Seelbach bei Hamm (German pronunciation: [ˈzeːlbax baɪ ˈham], lit. 'Seelbach near Hamm') is a municipality in the district of Altenkirchen, in Rhineland-Palatinate, in western Germany. The Marienthal Abbey is located in the municipality.

== Cultural heritages ==
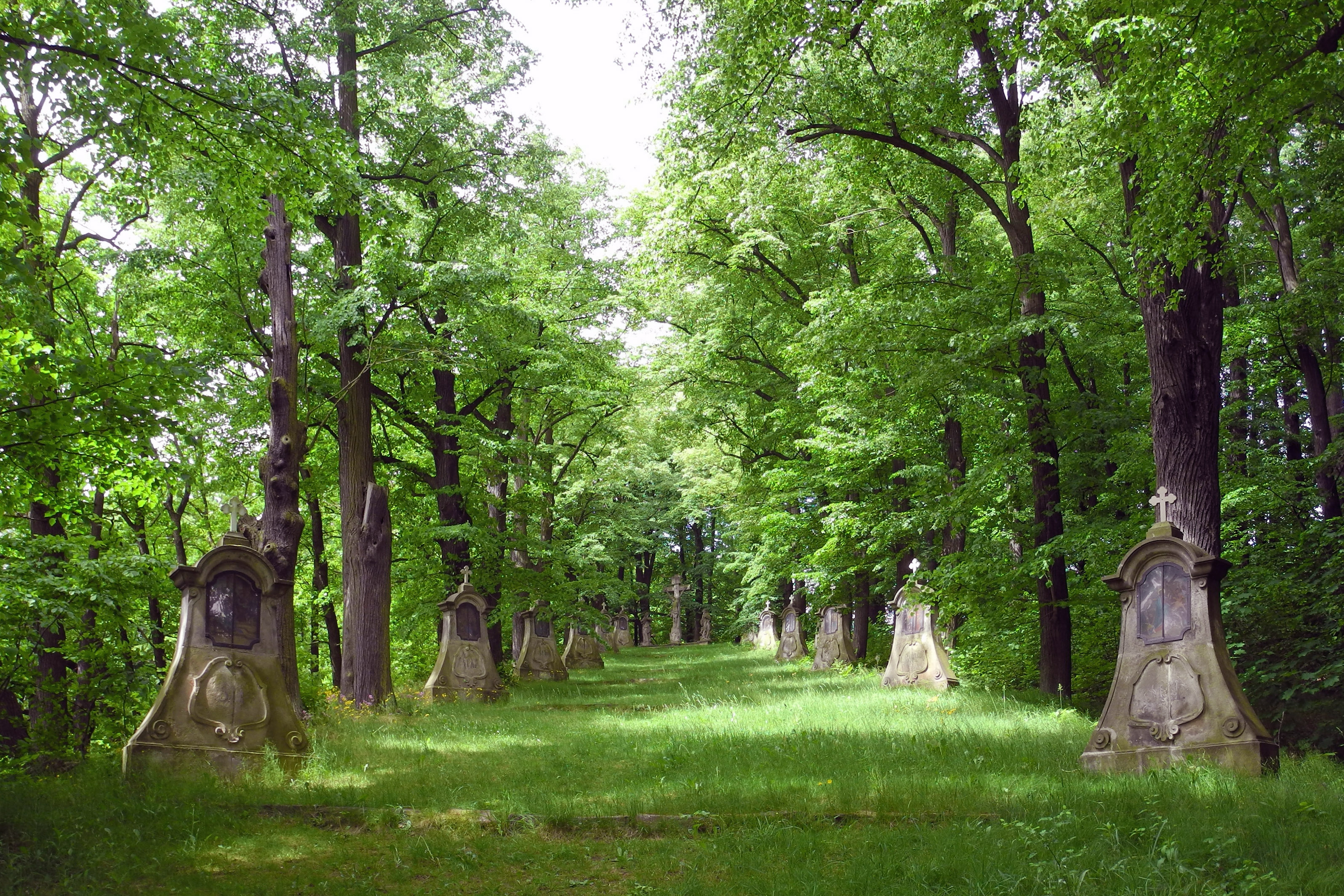
Marienthaler Kreuzweg around Marienthal Friary

Seelbach is well known due to the location of the Marienthal Friary that also hosts a pilgrims chapel as the Marienthaler Kreuzweg

== Transport links ==
The Kloster Marienthal train stop is located close to the district Marienthal and served by the line RB90 from Limburg (Lahn) to Siegen Hbf

The local bus line 288 connects Seelbach to the public transport, the village is located in the area of the transport association Verkehrsverbund Rhein-Mosel (VRM), fare zone number 919.

The Marienweg is a long distance walking path from Marienthal district to Marienstatt Abbey near Hachenburg, also the long distance walking path Westerwaldsteig from Herborn to Bad Hönningen passes Seelbachs district Marienthal.
