= Fürthen =

- Municipality
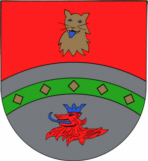
- Coat of arms

- Location of Fürthen within Altenkirchen (Westerwald) district
- Interactive map of Fürthen
- Location within Germany Location within Rhineland-Palatinate
- Coordinates: 50°46′48″N 7°40′4″E
- Country: Germany
- State: Rhineland-Palatinate
- District: Altenkirchen (Westerwald)
- Municipal assoc.: Hamm (Sieg)
- Subdivisions: 5

Government
  - Mayor (2019–24): Michael Rzytki

Area
  - Total: 2.20 km^{2} (0.85 sq mi)
- Elevation: 160 m (520 ft)

Population (2025-12-31)
  - Total: 1,241
  - Density: 564/km^{2} (1,460/sq mi)
- Time zone: UTC+01:00 (CET)
  - Summer (DST): UTC+02:00 (CEST)
- Postal codes: 57539
- Dialling codes: 02682
- Vehicle registration: AK
- Website: www.fürthen-sieg.de

Fürthen is a municipality in the district of Altenkirchen, in Rhineland-Palatinate, in western Germany.

== Transport ==
The trains on the Sieg Railway are passing Fürthen without a stop, the nearest train stations are Au (Sieg) and Etzbach. In the village is also access to the public bus lines 260, 284 and 288. Fürthen is located in the area of the transport association Verkehrsverbund Rhein-Mosel (VRM), zone number 923.
