= Hamm (Verbandsgemeinde) =

Hamm (Sieg)
- Verbandsgemeinde
- Coat of arms

- Location of Hamm (Sieg) within Landkreis Altenkirchen district
- Interactive map of Hamm (Sieg)
- Location within Germany Location within Rhineland-Palatinate
- Coordinates: 50°45′56″N 7°40′26″E
- Country: Germany
- State: Rhineland-Palatinate
- District: Landkreis Altenkirchen
- Subdivisions: 12 Gemeinden

Government
  - Mayor (2017–25): Dietmar Henrich

Area
  - Total: 42.31 km^{2} (16.34 sq mi)

Population (2025-12-31)
  - Total: 13,348
  - Density: 315.5/km^{2} (817.1/sq mi)
- Time zone: UTC+01:00 (CET)
  - Summer (DST): UTC+02:00 (CEST)
- Vehicle registration: AK
- Website: www.hamm-sieg.de

Hamm (Sieg) is a Verbandsgemeinde ("collective municipality") in the district of Altenkirchen, in Rhineland-Palatinate, Germany. The seat of the Verbandsgemeinde is in Hamm (Sieg).

== Geography ==
The Verbandsgemeinde Hamm (Sieg) is located in the northwestern part of the district of Altenkirchen. It borders the municipalities Windeck and Morsbach in its west and north and the Verbandsgemeinden Altenkirchen and Wissen in its south and east.

== Subdivisions ==
The Verbandsgemeinde Hamm (Sieg) consists of the following Ortsgemeinden ("local municipalities"):

Municipality	Area (km^{2})	Population
Birkenbeul	4.76	418
Bitzen	2.30	763
Breitscheidt	3.66	1018
Bruchertseifen	2.89	827
Etzbach	3.05	1326
Forst	4.25	599
Fürthen	2.20	1241
Hamm (Sieg) ¹	3.66	3899
Niederirsen	2.84	93
Pracht	5.50	1490
Roth	3.80	1540
Seelbach bei Hamm	3.40	134
Verbandsgemeinde Hamm (Sieg)	42.31	13348

¹ seat of the Verbandsgemeinde

== Population development ==
Development of the population in the region, that is Hamm (Sieg) today:

Year	Population
1815	2,175
1835	2,814
1871 ¹	4,424
1905 ¹	5,527
1939 ¹	6,881

Year	Population
1950 ¹	7,482
1961 ¹	8,195
1970 ¹	9,664
1987 ¹	10,297
2011 ¹	12,463

¹ Census results

== Politics ==
=== Verbandsgemeinde council ===
The council of the Verbandsgemeinde Hamm (Sieg) consists of 28 voluntary members. Its chairman is the Bürgermeister.

=== Coat of arms ===
The blazon of the coat of arms of Hamm (Sieg) is:

In Rot silberner Wellenschrägbalken nach links, belegt mit blaubewehrtem und -gezungtem goldenen Leopard, der in den Pranken ein silbernes Kammrad hält, im Schildfuss silberne Hammer und Schlegel schräggekreuzt. Im silbernen Schildbord 13 grüne Kugeln.

Translation:

=== Election districts ===
In state elections Verbandsgemeinde Hamm (Sieg) is part of electoral district 02-Altenkirchen, in federal elections it's part of electoral district 198-Neuwied.
