= Bundesstraße 62 =

Federal highway in Germany

B 62
- Bundesstraße 62

Route information
- Length: 247 km (153 mi)

Location
- Country: Germany
- States: Rhineland-Palatinate, North Rhine Westphalia, Hesse, Thuringia

Highway system
- Roads in Germany; Autobahns; List; Federal; List; State; E-roads

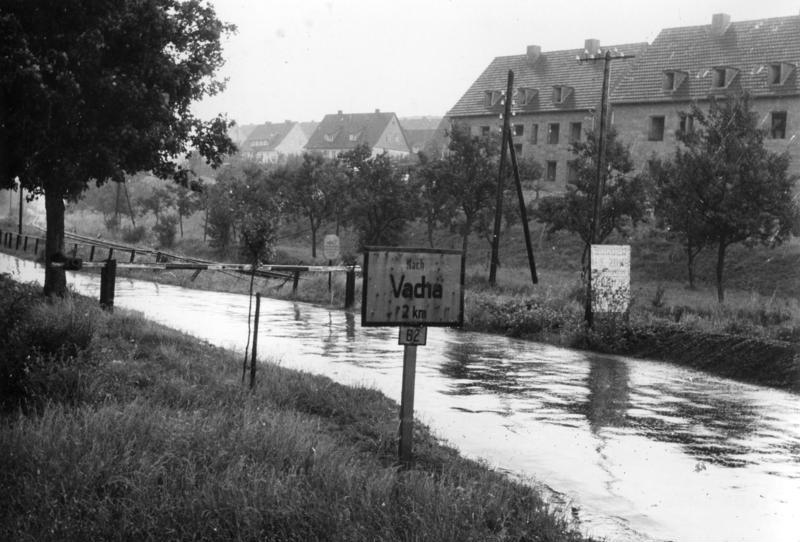
B 62 at the German-German border, 1952

Bundesstraße 62 or B62 is a German federal road. It connects Roth (Altenkirchen) with Barchfeld.

== See also ==
- List of federal highways in Germany
