= Birkenbeul =

- Municipality
- Location of Birkenbeul within Altenkirchen district
- Interactive map of Birkenbeul
- Location within Germany Location within Rhineland-Palatinate
- Coordinates: 50°44′20″N 7°37′20″E
- Country: Germany
- State: Rhineland-Palatinate
- District: Altenkirchen
- Municipal assoc.: Hamm (Sieg)

Government
  - Mayor (2019–24): Sven Merzhäuser

Area
  - Total: 4.76 km^{2} (1.84 sq mi)
- Elevation: 295 m (968 ft)

Population (2025-12-31)
  - Total: 418
  - Density: 87.8/km^{2} (227/sq mi)
- Time zone: UTC+01:00 (CET)
  - Summer (DST): UTC+02:00 (CEST)
- Postal codes: 57589
- Dialling codes: 02682
- Vehicle registration: AK
- Website: www.hamm-sieg.de

Birkenbeul coat of arms

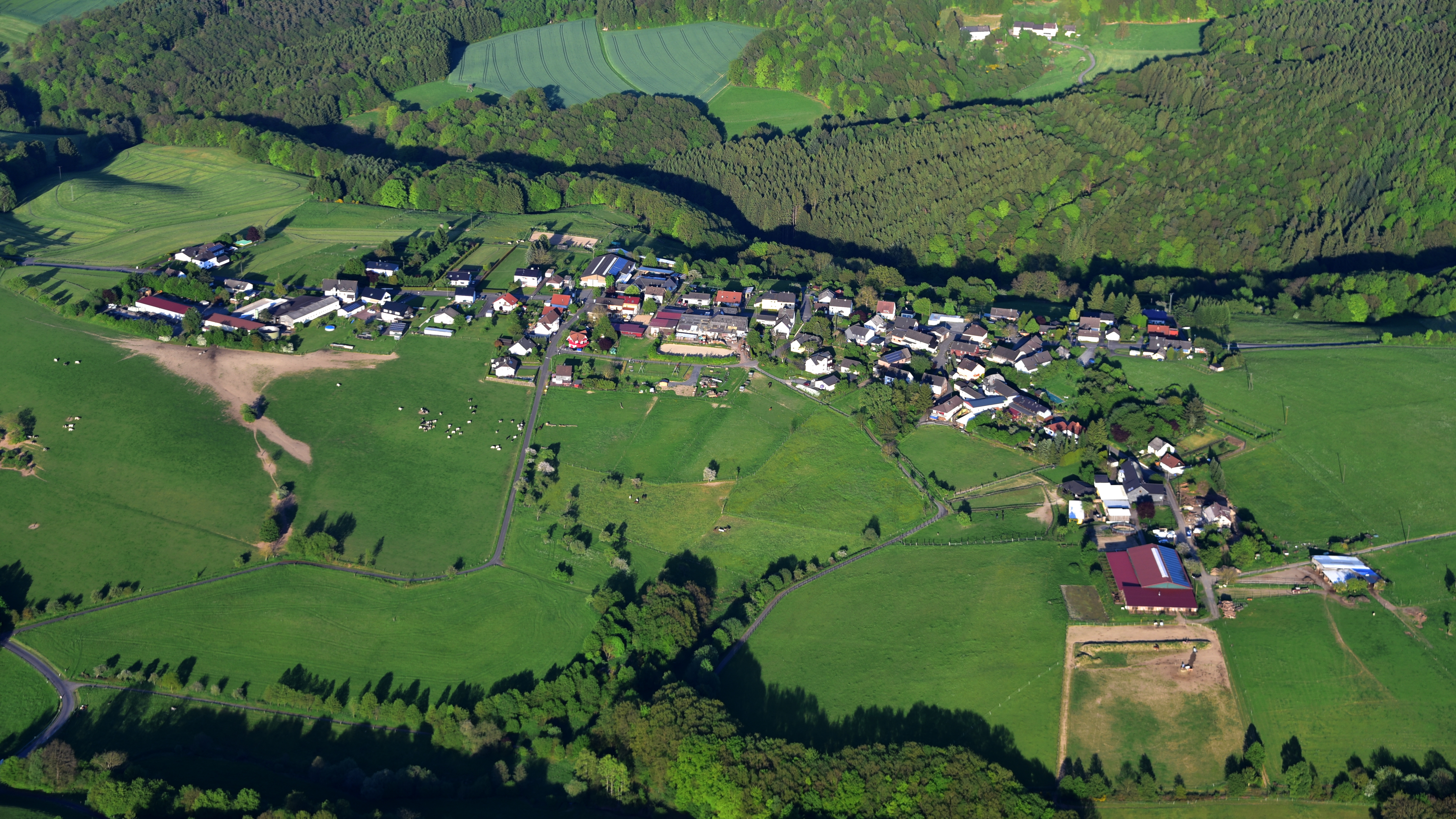
Airial view to Birkenbeul

Birkenbeul is a municipality in the district of Altenkirchen, in Rhineland-Palatinate, Germany.

== Transport links ==
Birkenbeul is located in the transport association Verkehrsverbund Rhein-Mosel (VRM), in the zone number 913 and served by the local bus lines 285 and 934
