= Volperhausen Castle =

- Burg Volperhausen
- Near Morsbach, Oberbergischer Kreis, North Rhine-Westphalia, Germany
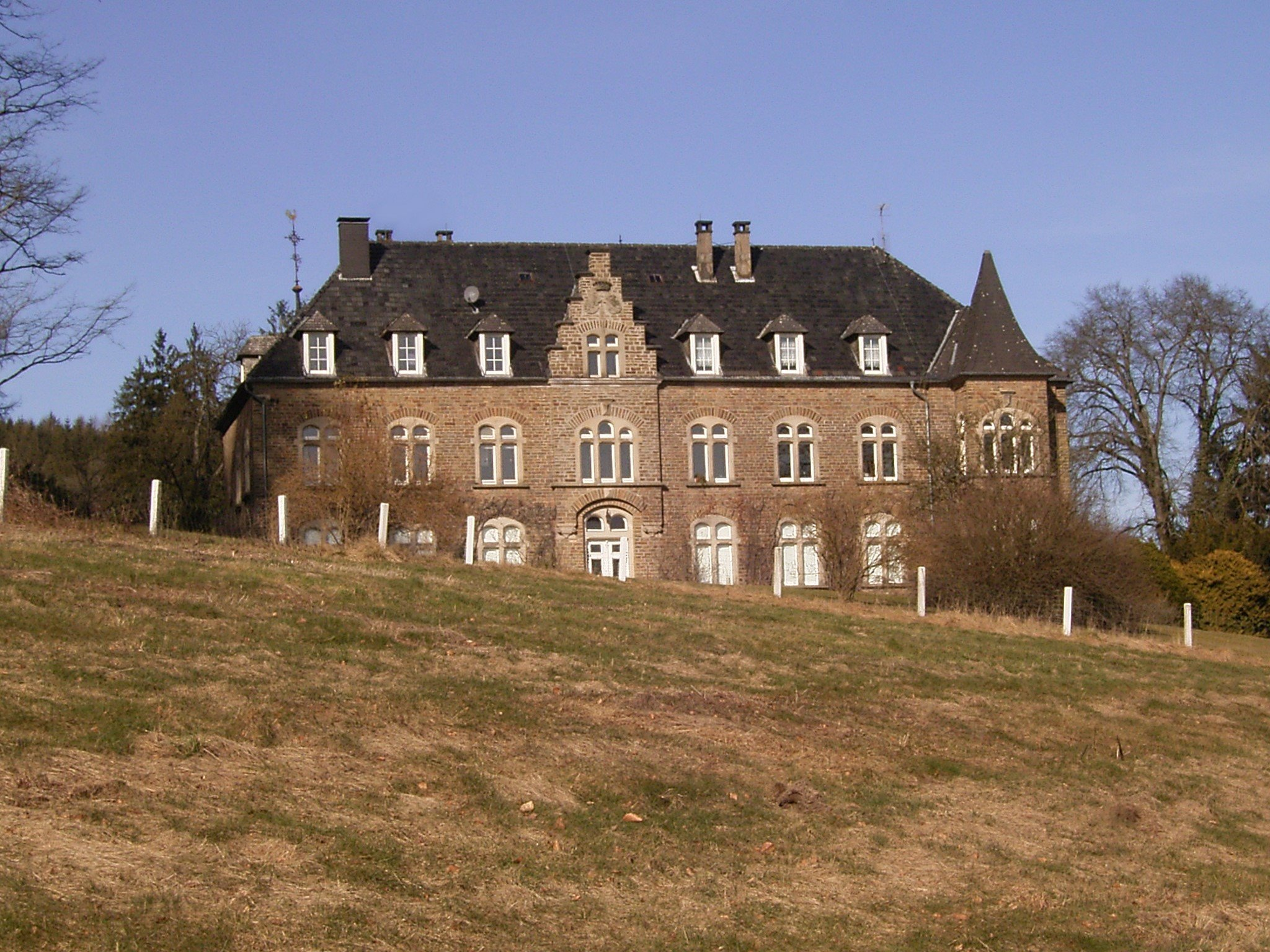
- Volperhausen Castle

Site information
- Owner: Private
- Controlled by: Private
- Open to the public: No
- Condition: Receive or essential parts.

Location
- Coordinates: 50.832°N 7.713°E
- Height: 188 m

Site history
- Built: 1462
- In use: Until
- Materials: Quarrystone

Volperhausen Castle (German: Burg Volperhausen) is a castle in the municipality of Morsbach in the Oberbergischer Kreis of North Rhine-Westphalia, Germany.

== Situation ==
Volperhausen Castle lies in four kilometres from Morsbach, but is still within the municipal area.

== History ==
Volperhausen Castle was first mentioned in 1462. The castle was originally in the possession of the Count of Hatzfeld, but in latter years has changed ownership several times. It was earlier an outpost of the castle Crottorf.

== Layout ==
Today, the castle consists of a 3-story stone building with a slender staircase tower. The moat existing today, which was also used by the former mill beside the castle house, still "points" to the type of a moated castle. Today a dwelling house stands on the foundation walls of the mill. The castle is a private property and, hence, can be visited only from the outside.

== Transport ==
Volpershausen had a stop at the discontinued Wissertalbahn (Wissen - Hermesdorf), moewdays the nearest train stop is Wissen at the Sieg Railway.
