= Birken-Honigsessen =

- Municipality
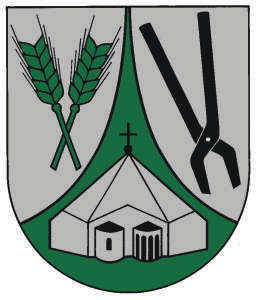
- Coat of arms

- Location of Birken-Honigsessen within Altenkirchen district
- Interactive map of Birken-Honigsessen
- Location within Germany Location within Rhineland-Palatinate
- Coordinates: 50°49′10″N 7°44′29″E
- Country: Germany
- State: Rhineland-Palatinate
- District: Altenkirchen
- Municipal assoc.: Wissen
- Subdivisions: 2

Government
  - Mayor (2019–24): Hubert Wagner

Area
  - Total: 18.14 km^{2} (7.00 sq mi)
- Elevation: 253 m (830 ft)

Population (2025-12-31)
  - Total: 2,519
  - Density: 138.9/km^{2} (359.7/sq mi)
- Time zone: UTC+01:00 (CET)
  - Summer (DST): UTC+02:00 (CEST)
- Postal codes: 57587
- Dialling codes: 02742
- Vehicle registration: AK
- Website: www.birken-honigsessen.de

Birken-Honigsessen is a municipality in the district of Altenkirchen, in Rhineland-Palatinate, Germany.
