= Niederirsen =

- Municipality
- Location of Niederirsen within Altenkirchen district
- Interactive map of Niederirsen
- Location within Germany Location within Rhineland-Palatinate
- Coordinates: 50°44′54″N 7°35′44″E
- Country: Germany
- State: Rhineland-Palatinate
- District: Altenkirchen
- Municipal assoc.: Hamm (Sieg)

Government
  - Mayor (2019–24): Andreas Knipp

Area
  - Total: 2.84 km^{2} (1.10 sq mi)
- Elevation: 195 m (640 ft)

Population (2025-12-31)
  - Total: 93
  - Density: 33/km^{2} (85/sq mi)
- Time zone: UTC+01:00 (CET)
  - Summer (DST): UTC+02:00 (CEST)
- Postal codes: 57589
- Dialling codes: 02682
- Vehicle registration: AK
- Website: www.hamm-sieg.de

Niederirsen is a municipality in the district of Altenkirchen, in Rhineland-Palatinate, in western Germany.
