= Bitzen =

- Municipality
- Location of Bitzen within Altenkirchen district
- Interactive map of Bitzen
- Location within Germany Location within Rhineland-Palatinate
- Coordinates: 50°47′37″N 7°41′23″E
- Country: Germany
- State: Rhineland-Palatinate
- District: Altenkirchen
- Municipal assoc.: Hamm (Sieg)

Government
  - Mayor (2019–24): Armin Weigel

Area
  - Total: 2.30 km^{2} (0.89 sq mi)
- Elevation: 250 m (820 ft)

Population (2025-12-31)
  - Total: 763
  - Density: 332/km^{2} (859/sq mi)
- Time zone: UTC+01:00 (CET)
  - Summer (DST): UTC+02:00 (CEST)
- Postal codes: 57539
- Dialling codes: 02682
- Vehicle registration: AK
- Website: www.bitzen-online.de

Bitzen is a municipality in the district of Altenkirchen, in Rhineland-Palatinate, Germany.
