= Hövels =

- Municipality
- Location of Hövels within Altenkirchen (Westerwald) district
- Interactive map of Hövels
- Location within Germany Location within Rhineland-Palatinate
- Coordinates: 50°47′51″N 7°46′46″E
- Country: Germany
- State: Rhineland-Palatinate
- District: Altenkirchen (Westerwald)
- Municipal assoc.: Wissen

Government
  - Mayor (2019–24): Wolfgang Klein

Area
  - Total: 7.87 km^{2} (3.04 sq mi)
- Elevation: 180 m (590 ft)

Population (2025-12-31)
  - Total: 522
  - Density: 66.3/km^{2} (172/sq mi)
- Time zone: UTC+01:00 (CET)
  - Summer (DST): UTC+02:00 (CEST)
- Postal codes: 57537
- Dialling codes: 02742, 02741
- Vehicle registration: AK
- Website: www.hoevels.de

Hövels is a municipality in the district of Altenkirchen, in Rhineland-Palatinate, in western Germany.

== Transport ==
The train stop is served by the line RB90 of DreiLänderBahn, a section of Hessische Landesbahn (HLB) , also the local bus line 258 serves the village.
