= Mittelhof =

- Municipality
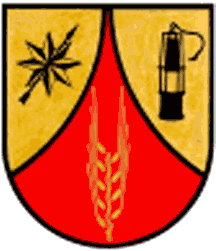
- Coat of arms

- Location of Mittelhof within Altenkirchen district
- Interactive map of Mittelhof
- Location within Germany Location within Rhineland-Palatinate
- Coordinates: 50°47′N 07°48′E
- Country: Germany
- State: Rhineland-Palatinate
- District: Altenkirchen
- Municipal assoc.: Wissen

Government
  - Mayor (2019–24): Franz Cordes

Area
  - Total: 11.13 km^{2} (4.30 sq mi)
- Elevation: 276 m (906 ft)

Population (2025-12-31)
  - Total: 1,040
  - Density: 93.4/km^{2} (242/sq mi)
- Time zone: UTC+01:00 (CET)
  - Summer (DST): UTC+02:00 (CEST)
- Postal codes: 57537
- Dialling codes: 02742
- Vehicle registration: AK
- Website: mittelhof.de

Mittelhof is a municipality in the district of Altenkirchen, in Rhineland-Palatinate, in western Germany.
