= Katzwinkel =

- Municipality
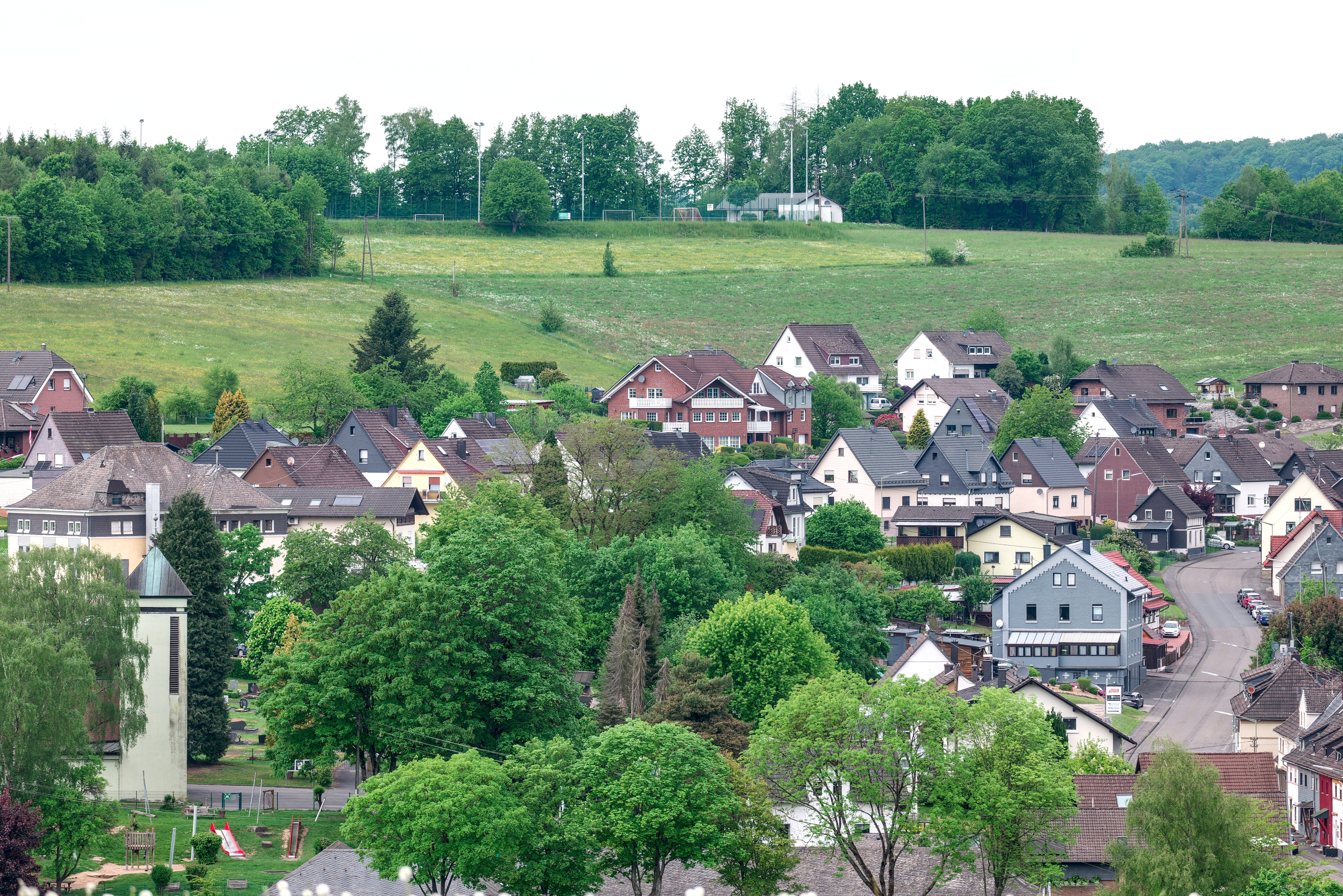

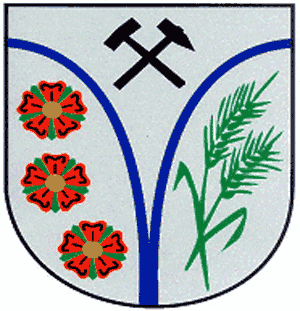
- Coat of arms

- Location of Katzwinkel within Altenkirchen district
- Interactive map of Katzwinkel
- Location within Germany Location within Rhineland-Palatinate
- Coordinates: 50°48′56″N 7°49′17″E
- Country: Germany
- State: Rhineland-Palatinate
- District: Altenkirchen
- Municipal assoc.: Wissen

Government
  - Mayor (2019–24): Hubert Becher (CDU)

Area
  - Total: 15.8 km^{2} (6.1 sq mi)
- Elevation: 287 m (942 ft)

Population (2025-12-31)
  - Total: 1,769
  - Density: 112/km^{2} (290/sq mi)
- Time zone: UTC+01:00 (CET)
  - Summer (DST): UTC+02:00 (CEST)
- Postal codes: 57581
- Dialling codes: 02741, 02742
- Vehicle registration: AK
- Website: www.katzwinkel-sieg.de

Katzwinkel (Sieg) (German pronunciation: [ˈkatsˌvɪŋkl̩]) is a municipality in the district of Altenkirchen, in Rhineland-Palatinate, in western Germany.

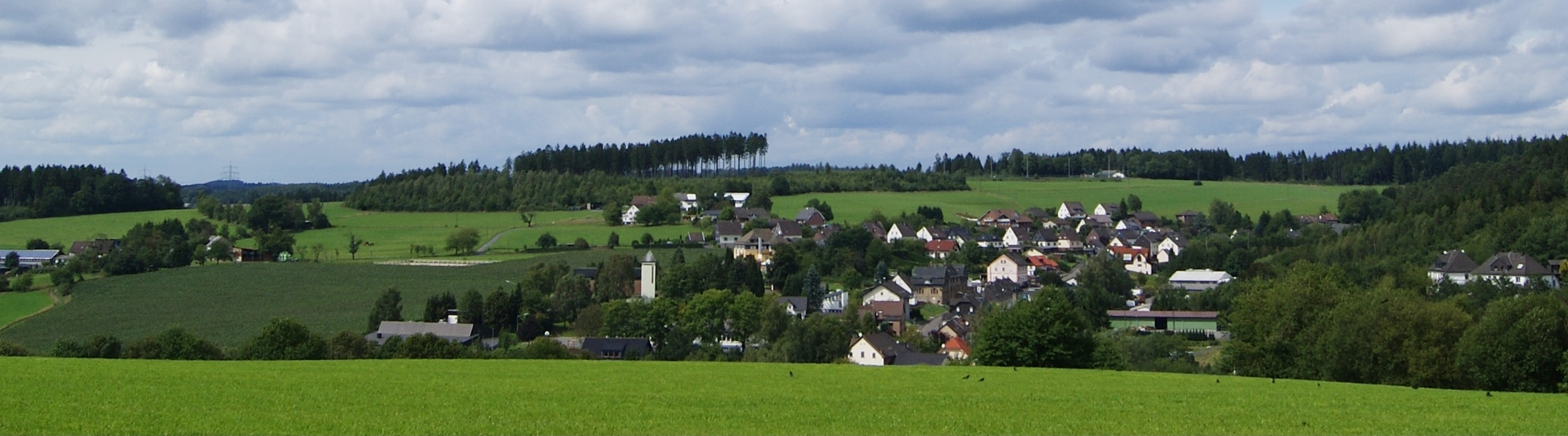
Katzwinkel and environs
