= Forst, Altenkirchen =

Forst
- Municipality
- Coat of arms

- Location of Forst within Altenkirchen district
- Interactive map of Forst
- Location within Germany Location within Rhineland-Palatinate
- Coordinates: 50°48′17″N 7°40′57″E
- Country: Germany
- State: Rhineland-Palatinate
- District: Altenkirchen
- Municipal assoc.: Hamm (Sieg)

Government
  - Mayor (2019–24): Jürgen Mai

Area
  - Total: 4.25 km^{2} (1.64 sq mi)
- Elevation: 272 m (892 ft)

Population (2025-12-31)
  - Total: 599
  - Density: 141/km^{2} (365/sq mi)
- Time zone: UTC+01:00 (CET)
  - Summer (DST): UTC+02:00 (CEST)
- Postal codes: 57537
- Dialling codes: 02292, 02742, 02682
- Vehicle registration: AK
- Website: www.hamm-sieg.de

Forst (German pronunciation: [fɔʁst]) is a municipality in the district of Altenkirchen, in Rhineland-Palatinate, Germany.
