= Hamm (Sieg) =

- Municipality
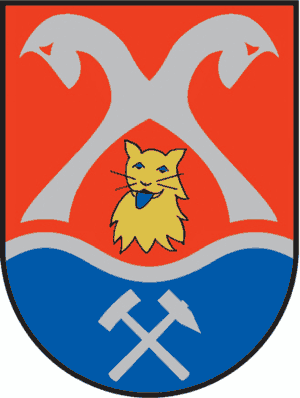
- Coat of arms

- Location of Hamm within Altenkirchen district
- Interactive map of Hamm
- Location within Germany Location within Rhineland-Palatinate
- Coordinates: 50°46′0″N 7°40′33″E
- Country: Germany
- State: Rhineland-Palatinate
- District: Altenkirchen
- Municipal assoc.: Hamm (Sieg)

Government
  - Mayor (2019–24): Bernd Niederhausen

Area
  - Total: 3.66 km^{2} (1.41 sq mi)
- Elevation: 220 m (720 ft)

Population (2025-12-31)
  - Total: 3,899
  - Density: 1,070/km^{2} (2,760/sq mi)
- Time zone: UTC+01:00 (CET)
  - Summer (DST): UTC+02:00 (CEST)
- Postal codes: 57577
- Dialling codes: 02682
- Vehicle registration: AK
- Website: www.hamm-sieg.de

Hamm (German pronunciation: [ham]) is a municipality in the district of Altenkirchen, in Rhineland-Palatinate, Germany. It is situated on the river Sieg, approximately 10 km north-east of Altenkirchen, and 40 km east of Bonn.

Hamm is the seat of the Verbandsgemeinde ("collective municipality") Hamm (Sieg). It is the home of the Raiffeisenmuseum, honouring Friedrich Wilhelm Raiffeisen who pioneered rural credit unions.

== Notable people ==
Tom Kalender (born 2008), racing driver

== Transport ==
The nearest train station is Au (Sieg) on the Sieg Railway (Cologne - Siegen).

The local bus line 288 connects Hamm with Marienthal, Seelbach, Hilgenroth, Obererbach and Au (Sieg); also the local bus lines 260, 285, 286 and 933 serve Hamm.

Hamm is located in the zone number 923 od the transport association Verkehrsverbund Rhein-Mosel (VRM).
