= Wissen (Verbandsgemeinde) =

- Verbandsgemeinde
- Coat of arms

- Location of Wissen within Landkreis Altenkirchen district
- Interactive map of Wissen
- Location within Germany Location within Rhineland-Palatinate
- Coordinates: 50°46′52″N 7°44′5″E
- Country: Germany
- State: Rhineland-Palatinate
- District: Landkreis Altenkirchen
- Subdivisions: 6 Gemeinden

Government
  - Mayor (2020–28): Benno Neuhoff (CDU)

Area
  - Total: 91.49 km^{2} (35.32 sq mi)

Population (2025-12-31)
  - Total: 15,296
  - Density: 167.2/km^{2} (433.0/sq mi)
- Time zone: UTC+01:00 (CET)
  - Summer (DST): UTC+02:00 (CEST)
- Vehicle registration: AK
- Website: www.wissen.eu

Wissen is a Verbandsgemeinde ("collective municipality") in the district of Altenkirchen, in Rhineland-Palatinate, Germany. The seat of the Verbandsgemeinde is in Wissen.

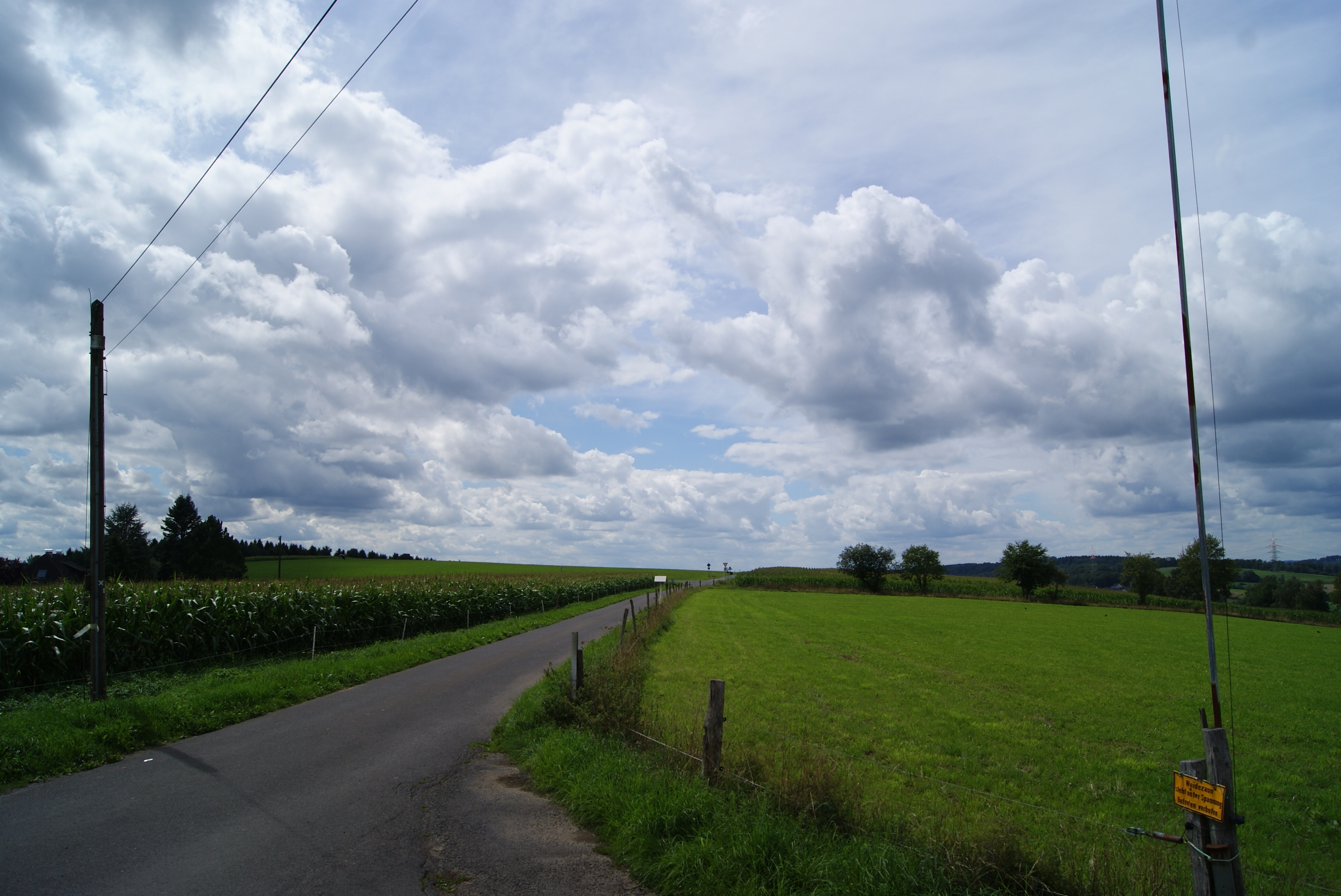
Sieg high route at Katzwinkel

The Verbandsgemeinde Wissen consists of the following 6 Ortsgemeinden ("local municipalities"):

Municipality	Area (km²)	Population
Birken-Honigsessen	18.14	2519
Hövels	7.88	522
Katzwinkel	15.80	1769
Mittelhof	11.13	1040
Selbach	3.66	777
Wissen *	34.88	8669
Verbandsgemeinde Wissen	91.49	15296

^{*} seat of the Verbandsgemeinde
