= Breitscheidt =

- Municipality
- Location of Breitscheidt within Altenkirchen district
- Interactive map of Breitscheidt
- Location within Germany Location within Rhineland-Palatinate
- Coordinates: 50°45′18″N 7°39′41″E
- Country: Germany
- State: Rhineland-Palatinate
- District: Altenkirchen
- Municipal assoc.: Hamm (Sieg)
- Subdivisions: 6

Government
  - Mayor (2019–24): Helmut Rötzel

Area
  - Total: 3.66 km^{2} (1.41 sq mi)
- Elevation: 285 m (935 ft)

Population (2025-12-31)
  - Total: 1,018
  - Density: 278/km^{2} (720/sq mi)
- Time zone: UTC+01:00 (CET)
  - Summer (DST): UTC+02:00 (CEST)
- Postal codes: 57539
- Dialling codes: 02682
- Vehicle registration: AK
- Website: www.hamm-sieg.de

Breitscheidt is a municipality in the district of Altenkirchen, in Rhineland-Palatinate, Germany.

== Transport ==
The train station Breitscheidt is located at the Engers–Au railway and served by the trains of line RB90 (Limburg (Lahn) - Diez Ost - Westerburg - Hachenburg - Altenkirchen - Au (Sieg) - Betzdorf (Sieg) - Siegen) of DreiLänderBahn, a section of Hessische Landesbahn (HLB) it is located on the area of the transport association Verkehrsverbund Rhein-Mosel (VRM), zone 919. Also the local bus lines 284, 287 and 288 run in Breitscheidt.
