= Etzbach =

- Municipality
- Location of Etzbach within Altenkirchen district
- Interactive map of Etzbach
- Location within Germany Location within Rhineland-Palatinate
- Coordinates: 50°47′N 7°41′E
- Country: Germany
- State: Rhineland-Palatinate
- District: Altenkirchen
- Municipal assoc.: Hamm (Sieg)
- Subdivisions: 2

Government
  - Mayor (2019–24): Ulf Langenbach

Area
  - Total: 3.05 km^{2} (1.18 sq mi)
- Elevation: 160 m (520 ft)

Population (2025-12-31)
  - Total: 1,326
  - Density: 435/km^{2} (1,130/sq mi)
- Time zone: UTC+01:00 (CET)
  - Summer (DST): UTC+02:00 (CEST)
- Postal codes: 57539
- Dialling codes: 02682
- Vehicle registration: AK
- Website: www.hamm-sieg.de

Etzbach is a municipality in the district of Altenkirchen, in Rhineland-Palatinate, Germany.

== Transport ==
Etzbach has a stop on the Sieg Railway which is served by line RB90 (Limburg (Lahn) - Diez Ost - Westerburg - Hachenburg - Altenkirchen - Au (Sieg) - Kirchen - Siegen Hbf) of DreiLänderBahn, a section of Hessische Landesbahn (HLB). Also the local bus line 261, 284 and 288 connect Etzbach to the public transport, Etzbach is located in the area of the transport association Verkehrsverbund Rhein-Mosel (VRM), zone number 923.
