= Roth, Altenkirchen =

Roth
- Municipality
- Location of Roth within Altenkirchen district
- Interactive map of Roth
- Location within Germany Location within Rhineland-Palatinate
- Coordinates: 50°45′58″N 7°42′21″E
- Country: Germany
- State: Rhineland-Palatinate
- District: Altenkirchen
- Municipal assoc.: Hamm (Sieg)
- Subdivisions: 7

Government
  - Mayor (2019–24): Udo Hammer

Area
  - Total: 3.78 km^{2} (1.46 sq mi)
- Elevation: 285 m (935 ft)

Population (2025-12-31)
  - Total: 1,540
  - Density: 407/km^{2} (1,060/sq mi)
- Time zone: UTC+01:00 (CET)
  - Summer (DST): UTC+02:00 (CEST)
- Postal codes: 57539
- Dialling codes: 02682, 02742
- Vehicle registration: AK
- Website: www.hamm-sieg.de

Roth (German pronunciation: [ʁoːt]) is a municipality in the district of Altenkirchen, in Rhineland-Palatinate, Germany.
