= Wissen =

- Town
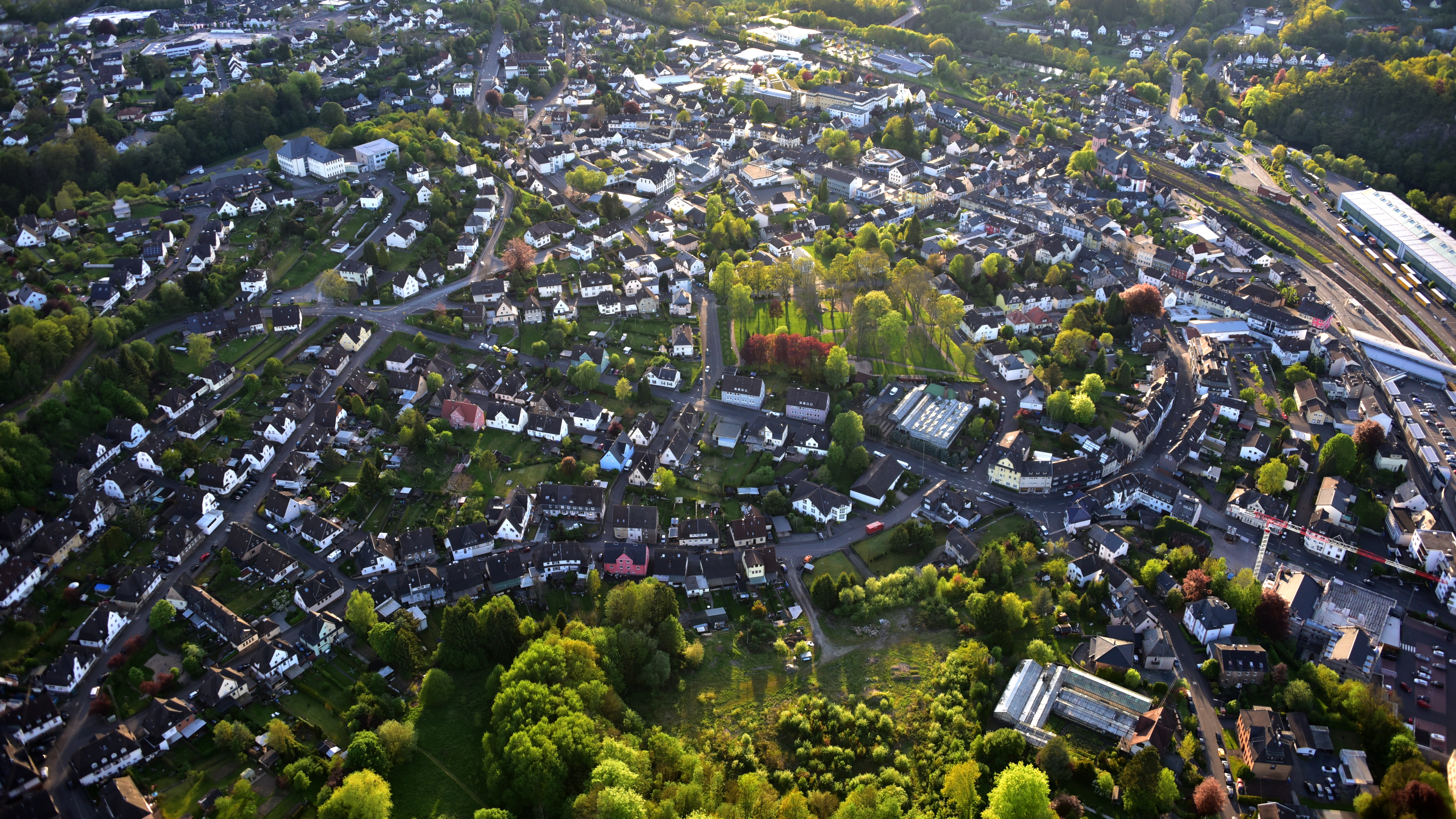
- Aerial view

- Coat of arms

- Location of Wissen within Altenkirchen (Westerwald) district
- Interactive map of Wissen
- Location within Germany Location within Rhineland-Palatinate
- Coordinates: 50°46′57″N 7°44′6″E
- Country: Germany
- State: Rhineland-Palatinate
- District: Altenkirchen (Westerwald)
- Municipal assoc.: Wissen

Government
  - Mayor (2019–24): Berno Neuhoff (CDU)

Area
  - Total: 34.88 km^{2} (13.47 sq mi)
- Elevation: 200 m (660 ft)

Population (2025-12-31)
  - Total: 8,669
  - Density: 248.5/km^{2} (643.7/sq mi)
- Time zone: UTC+01:00 (CET)
  - Summer (DST): UTC+02:00 (CEST)
- Postal codes: 57537
- Dialling codes: 02742
- Vehicle registration: AK
- Website: www.stadt-wissen.de

Wissen (German pronunciation: [ˈvɪsn̩]) is a town in the district of Altenkirchen, in Rhineland-Palatinate, Germany. It is situated on the river Sieg, approximately 12 km northeast of Altenkirchen.

Wissen is the seat of the Verbandsgemeinde ("collective municipality") Wissen.

== History ==
The name Wissen first appeared in the records in 1013 in a document now in the State Archives of Hanover. The original settlement was founded in 1048 during the second period of settlement in the woodland clearings on the perimeter of the Archbishopric of Cologne and was called "Wisnerofanc".

The lords of Arenberg, burgraves of Electoral Cologne, were given territorial lordship in 1176. After the family died out in 1280, the Archbishopric of Cologne acquired the parish of Wissen on the left bank of the river Sieg as a redeemed fief. That part of the parish on the right hand side of the Sieg remained in the hands of the lords of Wildenburg, whose Werther line of the House of Hatzfeld later also gained that part of Wissen on the left bank as a fief.

In 1803-1815 the two halves of the parish went to Nassau; later they were united under Prussian reign and Wissen became the seat of a Bürgermeisterei. In the 19th century, its communications links were considerably improved and bigger industries moved to Wissen. On 19 April 1969, Wissen received town rights. The incorporation of the three hitherto independent municipalities Elbergrund, Köttingerhöhe and Schönstein followed on 7 June 1969.

Population growth

The table below shows the growth of the population from 1871-1987 based on censuses.

- 1815 – 2,629
- 1835 – 3,151
- 1871 – 4,623
- 1905 – 6,282
- 1939 – 7,702
- 1950 – 8,447
- 1961 – 9,166
- 1970 – 8,951
- 1987 – 8,321
- 2000 – 8,825

Data source: Statistisches Landesamt Rheinland-Pfalz

== Transport ==
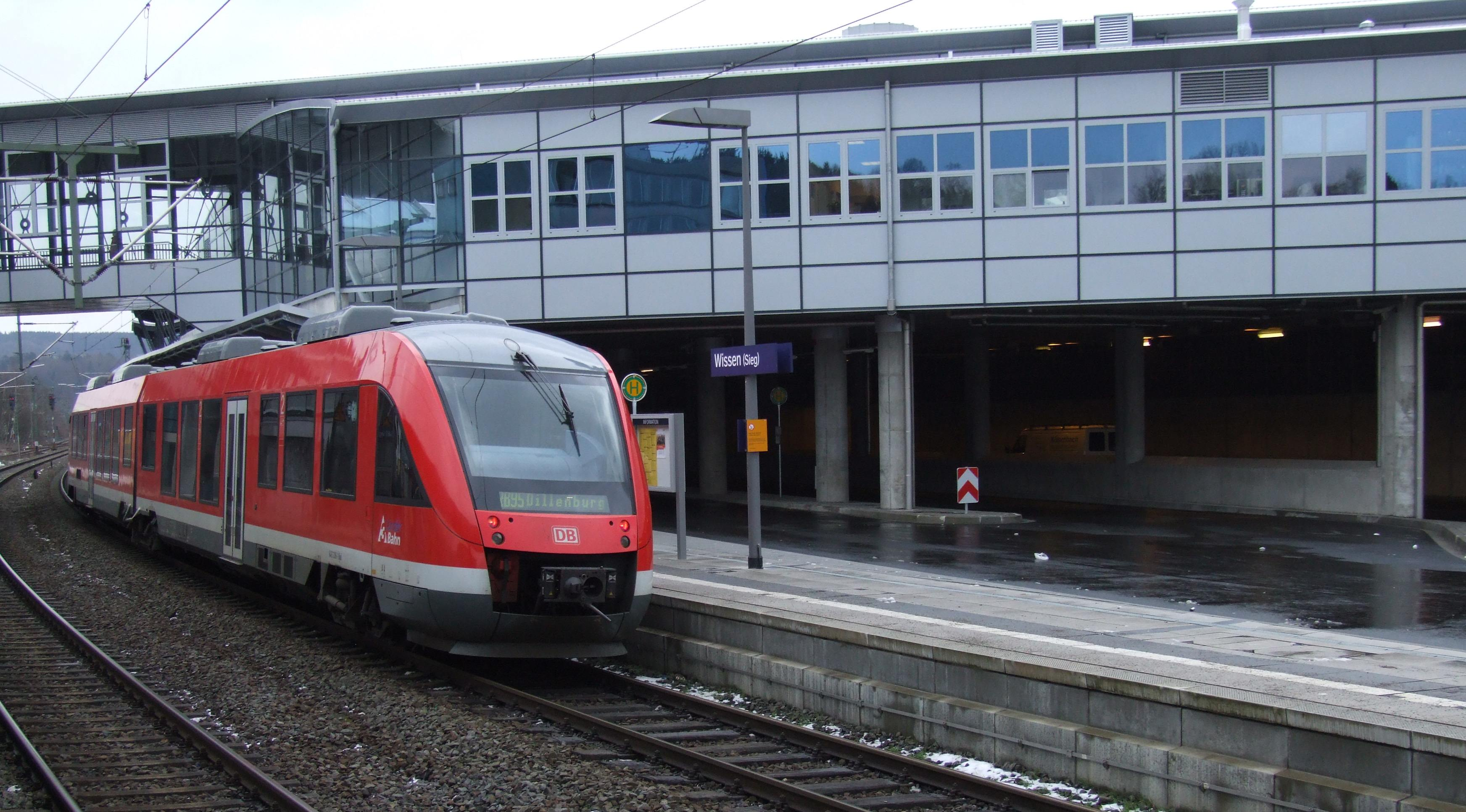
Wissen train station

Wissen is located on the Sieg Railway and served by lines RE9, Rhein-Sieg-Express of DB(Aachen - Cologne - Siegen) as well as RB90 (Limburg - Westerburg - Siegen) DreiLänderBahn, a section of Hessische Landesbahn (HLB), as well as the discontinued Wissertalbahn via Morsbach to Hermersdorf.

The local bus lines 256, 257, 258, 259, 261, 263, 264, 265, 268, 269, 280 and 410 also serve Wissen.

Wissen is located in the area of the transport association Verkehrsverbund Rhein-Mosel (VRM) in the zone number 922.

There is a park and ride parking lot at Wissen station constructed for all public transport users.
