= Morsbach =

- Municipality
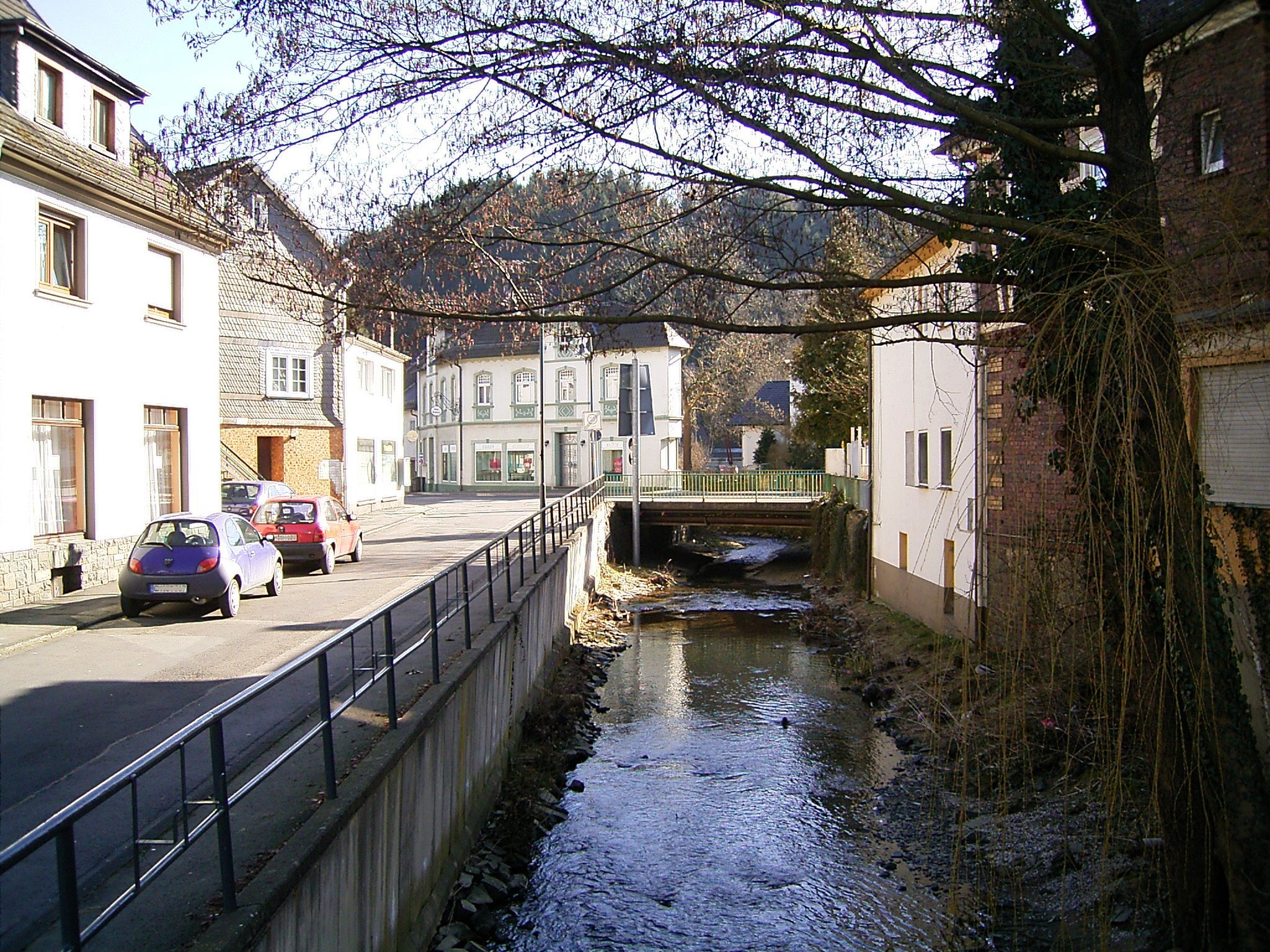

- Flag Coat of arms

- Location of Morsbach within Oberbergischer Kreis district
- Interactive map of Morsbach
- Location within Germany Location within North Rhine-Westphalia
- Coordinates: 50°52′N 7°43′E
- Country: Germany
- State: North Rhine-Westphalia
- Admin. region: Köln
- District: Oberbergischer Kreis

Government
  - Mayor (2020–25): Jörg Bukowski (Ind.)

Area
  - Total: 55.96 km^{2} (21.61 sq mi)
- Elevation: 206 m (676 ft)

Population (2025-12-31)
  - Total: 10,477
  - Density: 187.2/km^{2} (484.9/sq mi)
- Time zone: UTC+01:00 (CET)
  - Summer (DST): UTC+02:00 (CEST)
- Postal codes: 51597
- Dialling codes: 02294
- Vehicle registration: GM
- Website: www.morsbach.de

Morsbach (German pronunciation: [ˈmɔʁsbax]) is a municipality in Oberbergischer Kreis, a district in North Rhine-Westphalia near the border of Rhineland-Palatinate in Germany. In 2015, Morsbach's population was 10,600. The central village, also named Morsbach, has a population of 3,400. With a number of buildings dating back to the 12th century, it is a popular spot for hikers and other nature lovers. The other important villages are Lichtenberg (population 1400) in the north, Holpe (500) in the south and Wendershagen (300) in the north-east of the municipality

== Geography ==
Morsbach is 50 kilometres (31 mi) east of Cologne, in the southern corner of the Oberbergischer Kreis of North Rhine-Westphalia near its border with Rhineland-Palatinate. In 2015, its population was 10,600.

=== Subdivisions ===
The municipality (Gemeinde) is divided into 66 subdivisions (Ortsteile). In alphabetical order, they are:

- Alzen, Amberg, Appenhagen
- Berghausen, Birken, Birzel, Bitze, Böcklingen, Breitgen, Burg Volperhausen
- Ellingen, Erblingen, Euelsloch, Eugenienthal
- Flockenberg, Frankenthal
- Hahn, Halle, Hammer, Heide, Hellerseifen, Herbertshagen, Holpe, Hülstert
- Katzenbach, Kömpel, Korseifen
- Ley, Lichtenberg, Lützelseifen
- Neuhöfchen, Niederasbach, Niederdorf, Niederwarnsbach, Niederzielenbach
- Oberasbach, Oberholpe, Oberwarnsbach, Oberzielenbach, Ölmühle, Ortseifen
- Reinshagen, Rhein, Ritterseifen, Rolshagen, Rom, Rosengarten, Rossenbach
- Schlechtingen, Seifen, Siedenberg, Solseifen, Springe, Steimelhagen, Stentenbach, Stockshöhe, Straßerhof, Strick
- Überasbach, Überholz
- Volperhausen
- Wallerhausen, Wendershagen, Wittershagen
- Zinshardt

== History ==
- 4000-1800 BC: First settlement in the region, dating back to the Neolithic Age. A stone hatchet and a fragment of a flint blade have been found.
- 800 AD: Morschbach is part of Charlemagne's Holy Roman Empire. The parish of Morsbach was administered by the court officials of Sayn.
- 895: Morsbach is first mentioned in Duplicate of an Archival Book of the Inhabitants of Bonn, Saint Cassius Parish, which also mentions the Oberberg communities.
- 31 March 1131: Pope Innocent II mentions the Morsbach church.
- 1174: The counts along the Wupper received Windeck Castle from Earl Heinrich Raps of Thuringia as a gift.
- c. 1500: A chapel is built in Holpe as a branch church of Morsbach.
- 1563: The counts of Sayn-Homburg authorize a Lutheran church. The parish of Morsbach remains Catholic, and the Lutheran parish is in Holpe.
- 1634: Morsbach becomes a fiefdom of Count Hermann von Hatzfeldt.
- 1661: The fiefdom is reclaimed by Philipp Wilhelm von Berg.
- 1795: During the War of the First Coalition, French forces cross the Rhine, seize the Duchy of Berg and camp in Morsbach.
- 1805: Prince-elector Maximilian Joseph von Pfalz-Zweibrücken forms an alliance with Napoleon and becomes the king of Bavaria.
- 1806: Berg becomes a grand duchy, with Joachim Murat (Napoleon's brother-in-law) its regent.
- 1932: Kreis Waldbröl and Gummersbach are combined to form Oberbergischer Kreis. Morsbach has about 5,300 inhabitants, and its borders have been nearly unchanged for centuries.
- 1946: Oberbergischer Kreis becomes part of North Rhine-Westphalia in West Germany.

== Coat of arms ==
Morsbach's coat of arms was granted on August 14, 1937. The upper part is a lion (symbolic of the Counts of Berg), and the lower part is a marshy brook.

== Population ==
Historical population

Year	Pop.	±% p.a.
1838	3,563	—
1866	3,857	+0.28%
1939	5,685	+0.53%
1950	6,979	+1.88%
1960	7,155	+0.25%
1965	8,230	+2.84%
1970	8,871	+1.51%
1975	9,569	+1.53%
1980	10,170	+1.23%

Year	Pop.	±% p.a.
1985	10,118	−0.10%
1990	10,366	+0.49%
1995	11,169	+1.50%
2000	11,464	+0.52%
2005	11,528	+0.11%
2010	11,042	−0.86%
2015	10,402	−1.19%
2020	10,032	−0.72%
2025	10,477	+0.87%

Source: Landesdatabank Nordrhein-Westfalen (1965-2025)

== Points of interest ==
- The Romanesque Saint Gertrud basilica, whose tower dates to the second half of the 12th century; other sections date to the first half of the 13th century.
- Castle Volperhausen
- The heritage-protected Morsbach station building. According to its preservation order, "The preservation of this building is of public interest because of its locally influenced design of the uniform Prussian station building type and also because of its special roof design."

== Twin towns ==
- Großrosseln (state of Saarland, Germany)
- Milly-la-Forêt (département of Essonne, France)

== Transport ==
Morsbach had access to the railway service through the former Morsbach station at Wissertalbahn (Wissen - Hermesdorf) which isnout of service today, the nearest train station is Wissen at the Sieg Railway.

== Bibliography ==
- Christoph Buchen / Erwin Weber: Alt Morsbach. Die Gemeinde Morsbach in alten Bildern, Meinerzhagen 1981
- Morsbach. Chronik einer oberbergischen Gemeinde, hg. von der Gemeinde Morsbach, Meinerzhagen 1987
- 1100 Jahre Morsbach. 895 - 1995, hg. von der Gemeinde Morsbach, Waldbröl 1995
