= Verkehrsverbund Rhein-Mosel =

German public transport association

- Type: GmbH
- Industry: Public transport
- Founded: 1 January 1996
- Headquarters: Schloßstraße 18–20 56068 Koblenz, Germany
- Website: www.vrminfo.de

Koblenz Schlossstraße, location of the VRM headquarters

Verkehrsverbund Rhein-Mosel (in short VRM; in English, the Rhine-Moselle Transport Association) is a transport association in Rhineland-Palatinate in Germany. Along with the Verkehrsverbund Region Trier (VRT), Rhein-Nahe-Nahverkehrsverbund (RNN) and Verkehrsverbund Rhein-Neckar (VRN), it is one of four transport associations with headquarters in the state. The headquarters are located at Schlossstraße 18–20 in Koblenz.

== Area ==
Koblenz Stadtmitte station, pictured from the Löhr-Center

The VRM area covers the city of Koblenz as well as the districts of Altenkirchen, Rhein-Lahn and Mayen-Koblenz, Cochem-Zell, Westerwaldkreis, Neuwied, Rhein-Hunsrück, Ahrweiler, Rhein-Lahn and Mayen-Koblenz. At the northern end it borders the Verkehrsverbund Rhein-Sieg, in the north-east and the east the Westfalen-Tarif, in the east the Rhein-Main-Verkehrsverbund, in the south the Rhein-Nahe-Nahverkehrsverbund, and in the west the Verkehrsverbund Region Trier. VRM has an area of about 6,400 km^{2} (2,500 sq mi) and a population of about 1.3 million residents.

== History ==
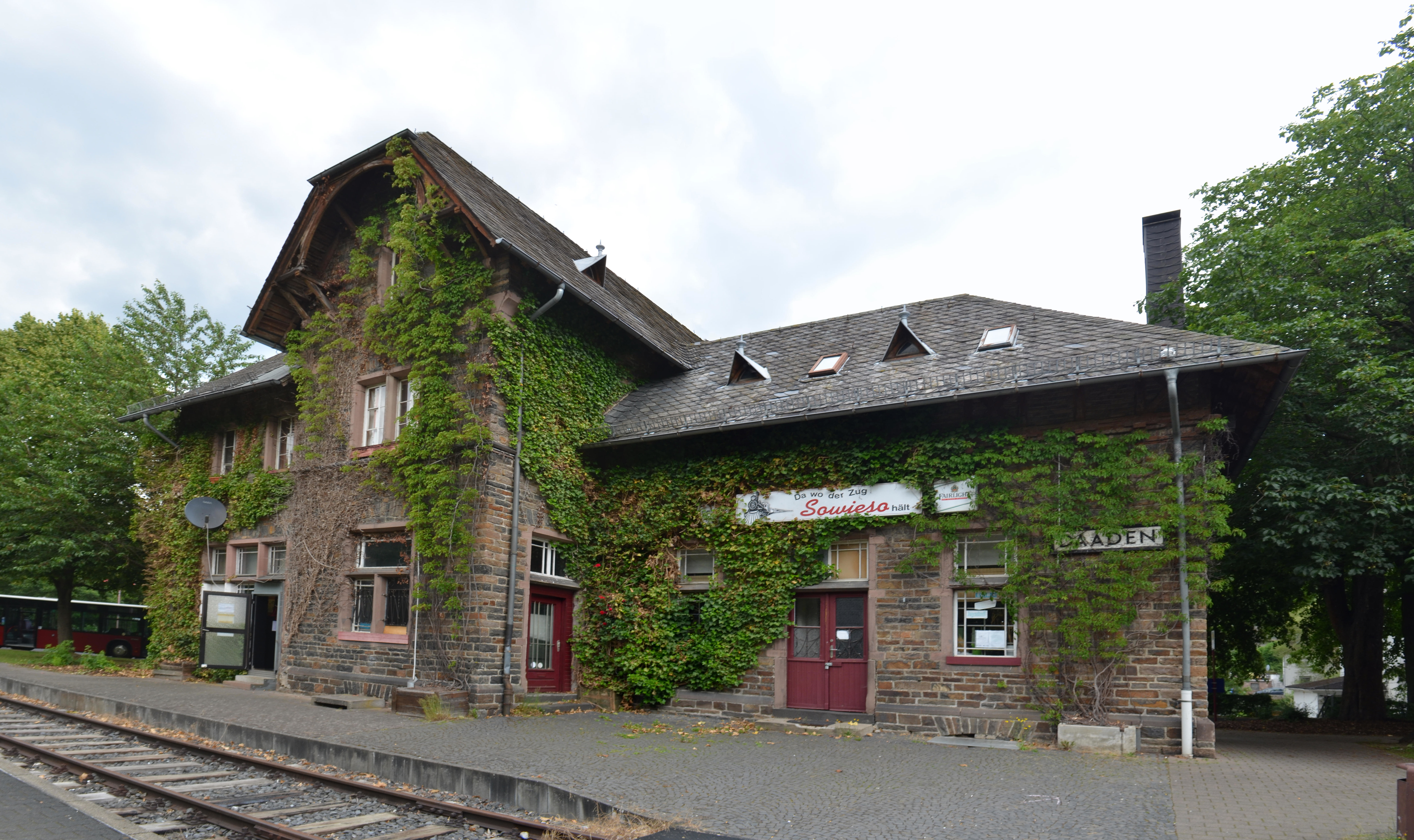
Daaden station

The VRM was founded on 1 January 1996 by the districts of Ahrweiler, Cochem-Zell, Mayen-Koblenz, Neuwied, Rhein-Hunsrück, Rhein-Lahn, Westerwald, and the city of Koblenz. Since 1 January 2009, the district of Altenkirchen (Westerwald) has also been a member of the VRM. These districts all belonged to the former Koblenz administrative region. The Westerwald district has only applied the VRM fare system since 1 January 2017, but joined the VRM on 1 January 1996, along with the other districts and the city of Koblenz, initially without applying the VRM fare system.

== Network ==
Ferry from Ehrenbreitstein district of Koblenz to Altstadt district

The network is owned and operated by the transport companies. As of December 2024, a rail network of about 517 km (321 mi) and 145 stations are located in the VRM area as well as about 11,536 km (7,168 mi) of city and local bus routes and 4,905 bus stops.

== Means of transport ==
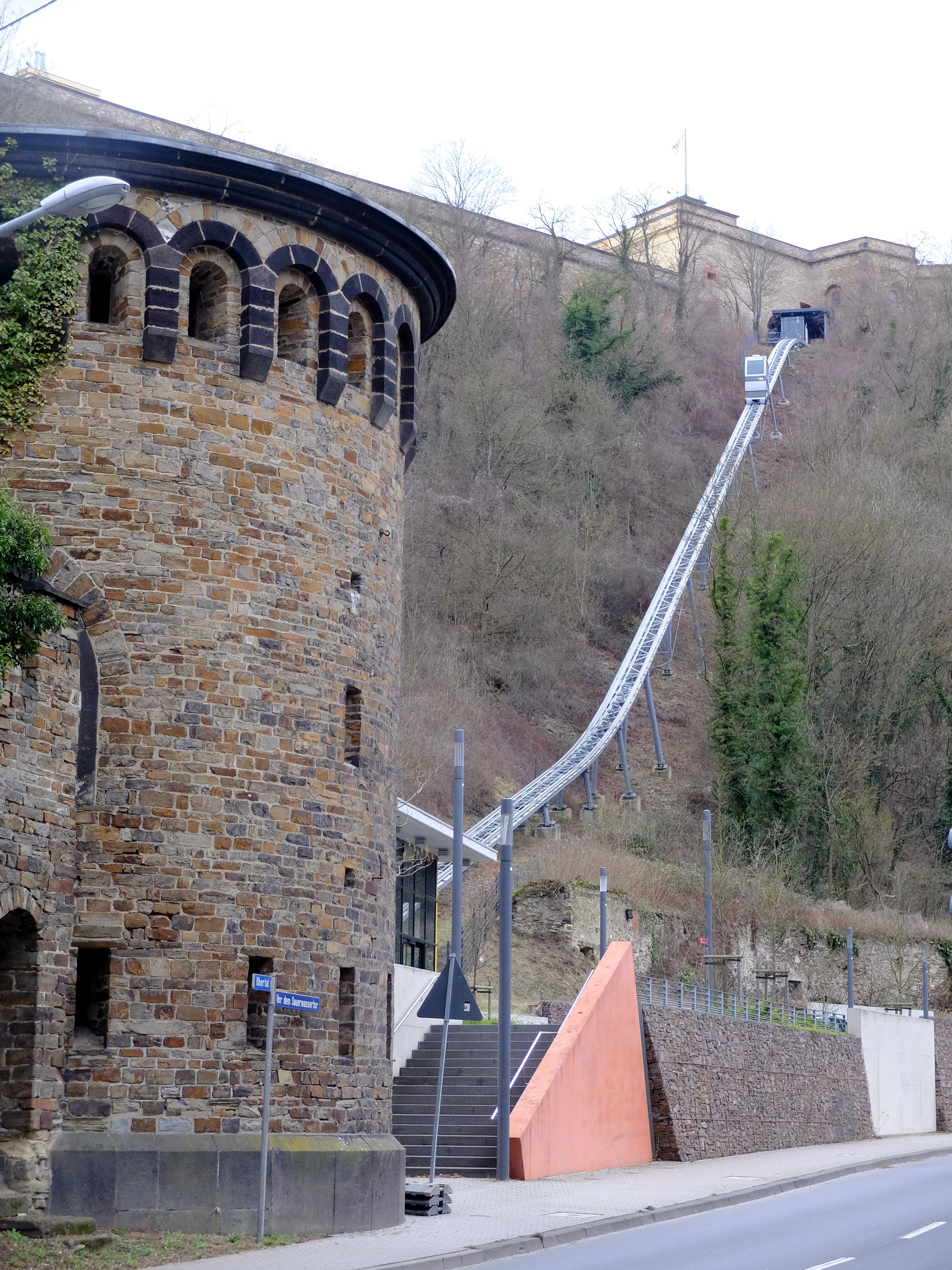
Koblenz cable car from Ehrenbreitstein district to Ehrenbreitstein Fortress

Because Rhineland-Palatinate is not a urban state, the primary means of transport are city and local buses and local trains (Regional-Express and Regionalbahn). Others include the cable car from the Ehrenbreitstein district of Koblenz to Koblenz Ehrenbreitstein fortress and some ferries on the rivers Rhine and Moselle.

== Transport companies ==
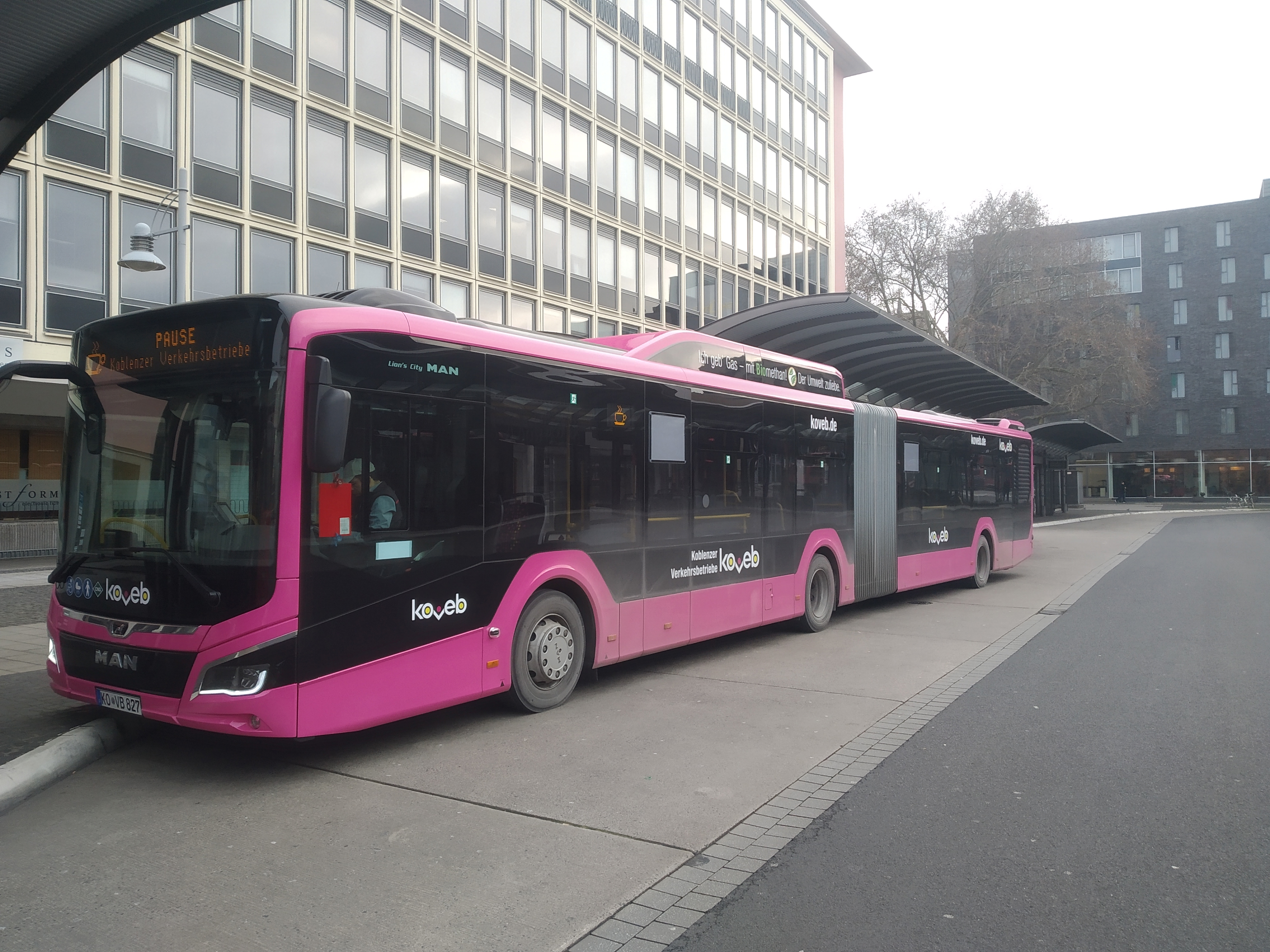
City bus of VRM member company KOVEB in Koblenz Hauptbahnhof bus stand

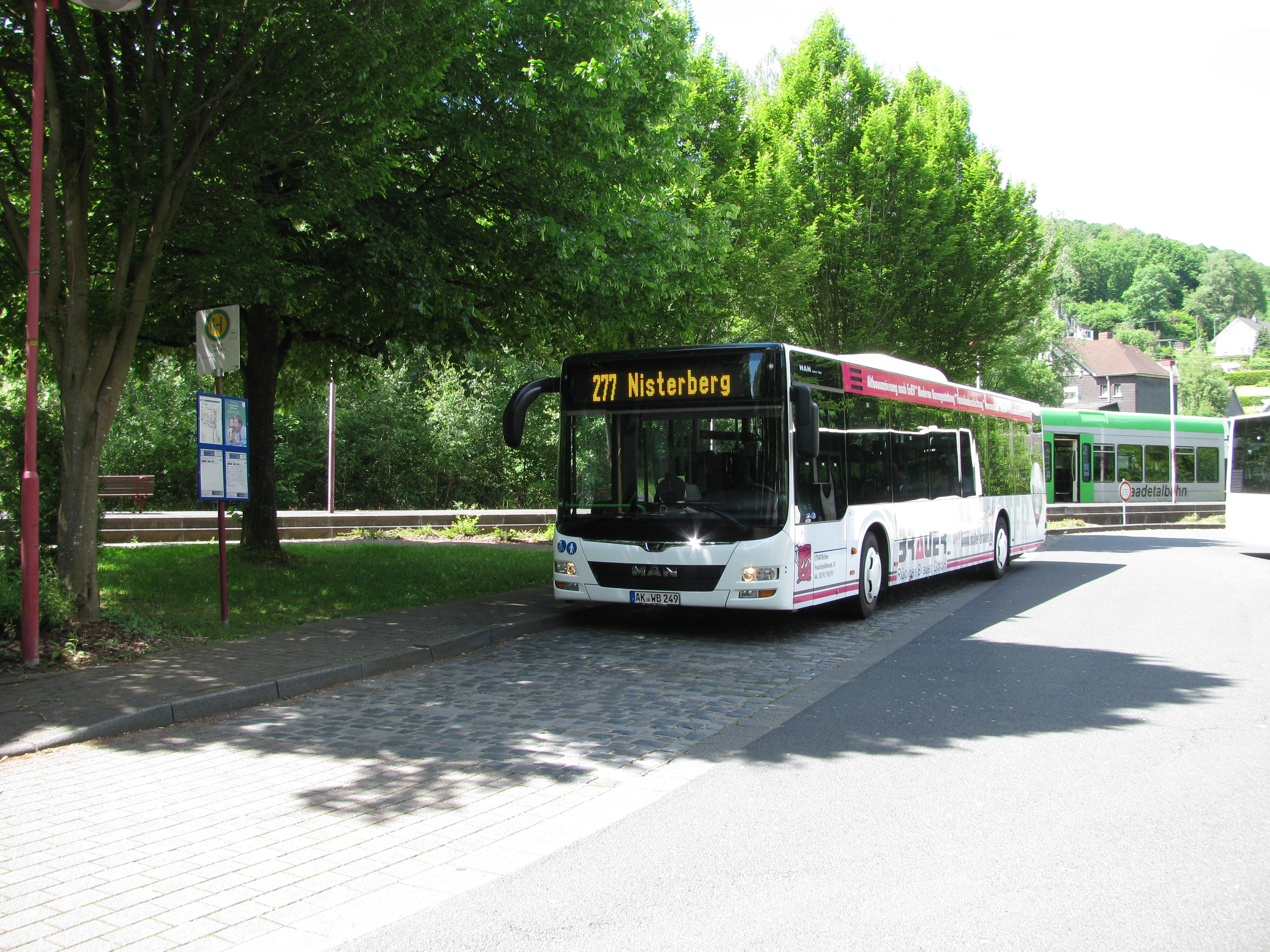
Local bus of Westerwaldbus in Daaden

VRM bus timetable

There are 43 member companies, most of which are bus operators. The largest companies are:

- DB Regio
- Transdev
- Hessische Landesbahn (HLB), DreiLänderBahn section
- Fähre Loreley GmbH
- Griesar Reisedienst
- Martin Becker GmbH
- Westerwaldbahn GmbH
- Westerwaldbus
- KOVEB, (former EVM, KEVAG)
- DB Regio Bus
- VIAS
- Zickenheiner

== Fare system ==
=== Fare zones ===
The VRM area is split into fare zones (Tarifwaben). Fares are calculated based on the number of zones passed through. The numbers have three letters, for example, Wabe 101:Koblenz City and the first letter shows the municipalities, these are:

- Koblenz, starting with 1
- Neuwied district, starting with 2
- Mayen-Koblenz district, starting with 3
- Westerwald district, starting with 4
- Rhine-Lahn district, starting with 5
- Rhine-Hunsrueck district, starting with 6
- Ahrweiler district, starting with 8
- Cochem-Zell district, starting with 7
- Altenkirchen district, starting with 9

Additionally, transitional fare zones of the VRM, that are located within the area of another transport association, start with letter 1 as well, for example zone 177, Limburg (Lahn).

The Tarifwabe 100 includes the whole city of Koblenz (Tarifwaben 101 – 107).

Bordering transport/fare associations are:

- Rhein-Main-Verkehrsverbund (RMV)
- Westfalen-Tarif
- Verkehrsverbund Rhein-Sieg (VRS)
- Verkehrsverbund Region Trier (VRT)
- Rhein-Nahe-Nahverkehrsverbund (RNN)

In the districts Altenkirchen, Neuwied and Ahrweiler the fare of the transport association Verkehrsverbund Rhein-Sieg (VRS) is valid as transitional fare, on Sieg Railway, in the Altenkirchen district, the Westfalen-Tarif is valid upto Etzbach as transitional fare.

=== Ticket system ===
Additionally, Rheinland-Pfalz Ticket is valid in all modes of transport, Quer-durchs-Land-Ticket in all local railways (RB and RE), BahnCard 100 is valid in local railway lines and DB Regio Bus, Bahncard 25 and Bahncard 50 give 25% off in all modes of transport. Also Deutschlandticket is valid in all modes of transport.

VRM-Tickets are:

- One way ticket
- Day ticket
- Three days ticket
- Small group day ticket
- Weekly ticket
- Monthly ticket
- 60-Plus ticket (valid for all passengers from age 60)
- 9 AM monthly ticket
- Students monthly ticket
- Schülerplus-Ticket
- Additional ticket (to use first class in trains, travel with children or dogs)

=== VRM Mobilcard ===
VRM issues it's own discount card, which is valid in all modes of transport within the VRM area and gives 25% off on all one way tickets, it is cheaper than Bahncard 25 due to it's limited validity within the VRM area.

=== Means of transport without acceptance of VRM-tickets ===
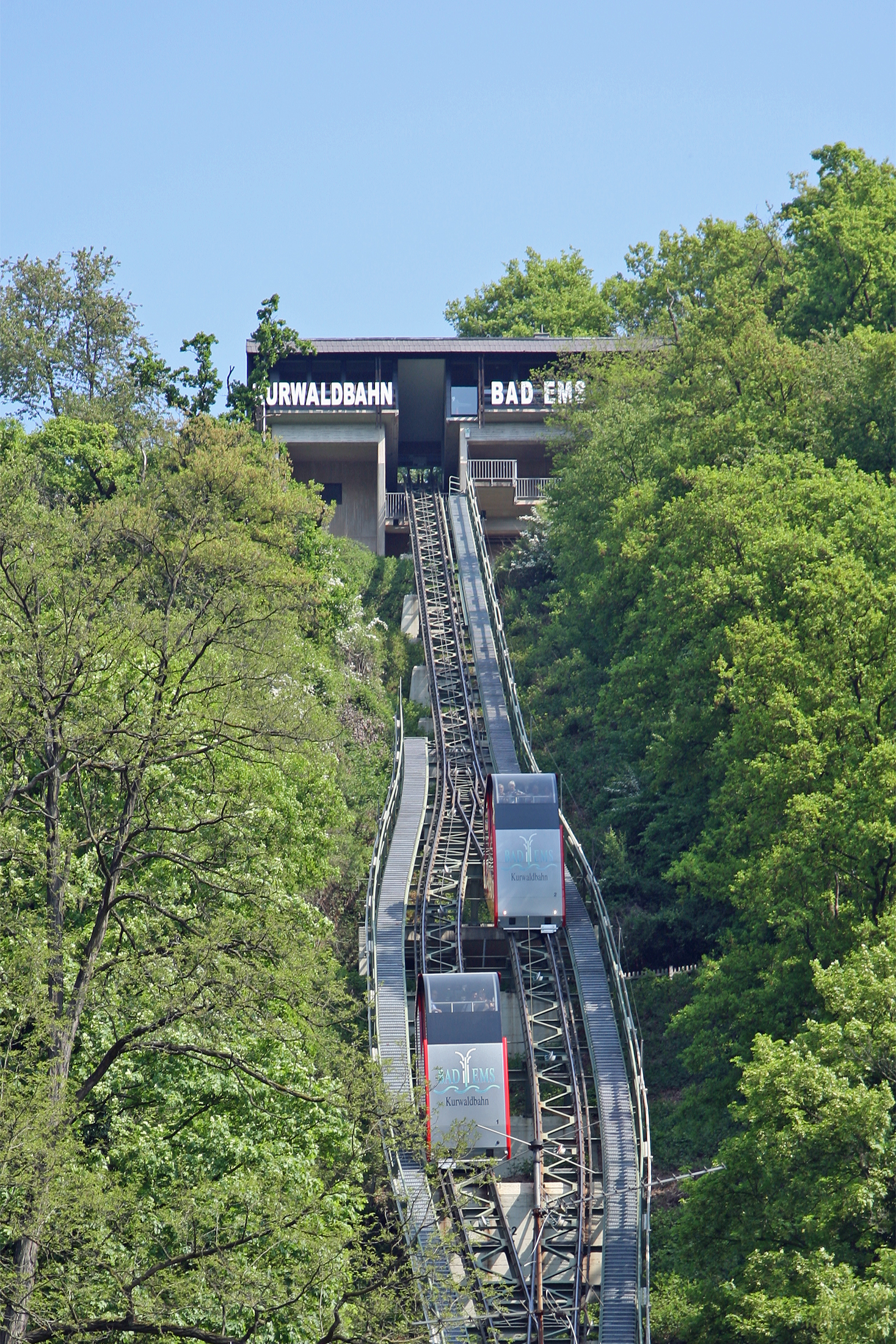
The funicular Kurwaldbahn in Bad Ems does not accept VRM-tickets

VRM-Tickets are not valid in long distance busses like Flixbus, long distance trains (Intercity-Express| (ICE), Nightjet (NJ), Intercity (IC), Koblenz cable car (Rhine passing aerial ropeway) in Koblenz and Kurwaldbahn in Bad Ems.

== Maps ==
VRM issues overview maps covering all bus routes and stops, railway lines and stations, and park-and-ride facilities in its area.
