= Rhöndorf station =

Railway station in Bad Honnef, Germany

Rhöndorf
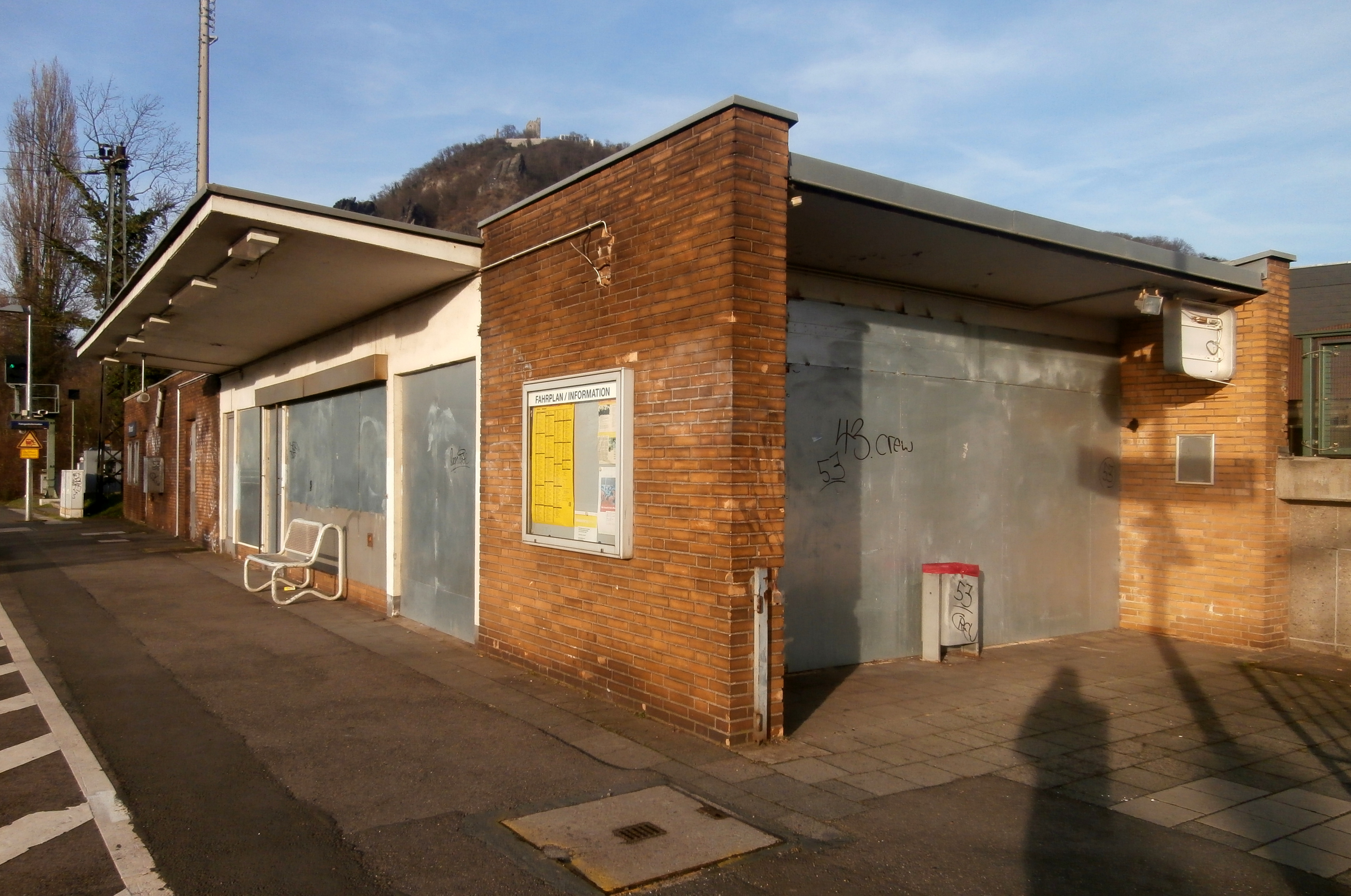
- Rhöndorf station (2015)

General information
- Location: Löwenburgstr., Rhöndorf, Bad Honnef, NRW; Germany
- Coordinates: 50°39′29″N 7°12′37″E
- Owner: DB Netz
- Operator: DB Station&Service
- Line: East Rhine Railway (km 101.3)
- Platforms: 3

Construction
- Accessible: Platform 1 only

Other information
- Station code: 5263
- DS100 code: KRHD
- IBNR: 8005074
- Category: 5
- Fare zone: VRS: 2561
- Website: www.bahnhof.de

History
- Opened: 11 July 1870

Services
| Preceding station | DB Regio NRW | Following station |
|---|---|---|
| Königswinter towards Mönchengladbach Hbf | RE 8 | Bad Honnef (Rhein) towards Koblenz Hbf |
| Königswinter towards Mönchengladbach Hbf | RB 27 | Bad Honnef (Rhein) towards Koblenz Hbf |
Location
- Location within North Rhine-Westphalia

Rhöndorf is a station on the East Rhine Railway in Rhöndorf, a district of the town of Bad Honnef in the German state of North Rhine-Westphalia. It was opened on 11 July 1870 in the course of the extension of the East Rhine Railway from Neuwied to Oberkassel.

== Location and equipment ==
The station is located on the western edge of Rhöndorf, below a slope and a concrete wall. Federal highway 42 is immediately to the east and the Rhine bank is nearby to the west. It comprises two platforms and is classified by Deutsche Bahn as category 5. The platform access is located below the southern bridge over Karl-Broel-Straße, which was built in 1906. To the west of the railway station is a park and ride car park and beyond that is the Rhöndorf stop of the Bonn Stadtbahn, which allows easy interchange.

== Station building ==
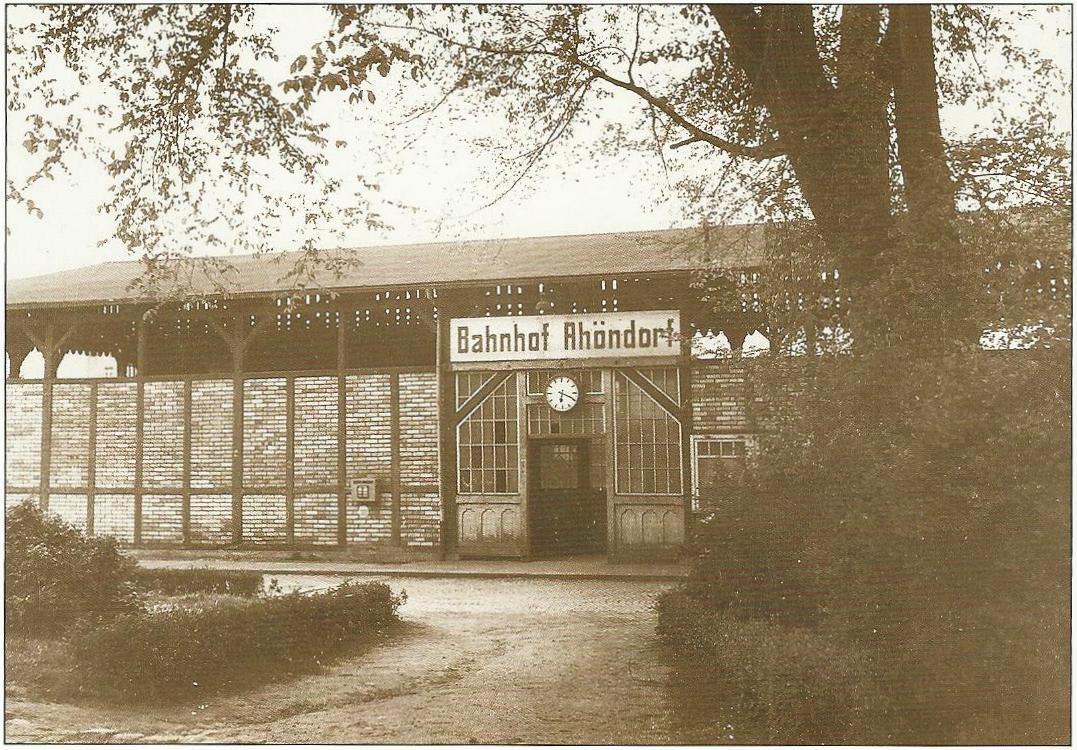
Original station and entrance building

The original station and entrance building was built in brick and timber. As a consequence of the building of federal highway 42 in the 1950s and the associated reconstruction of the station forecourt, it was demolished and rebuilt in 1962 in a changed and significantly reduced form.

== Current situation ==
In 2000, 500 passengers used the station each day. In 2005, the area surrounding the platform access to the new bridge over Karl-Broel-Straße was renewed. More recently, the station has lost its operational significance: the ticket office was closed in 2008, a temporary passenger level crossing for the disabled was removed in 2010 and the local train dispatcher was withdrawn at the end of 2011 when an electronic interlocking was installed. In response to this decline, Deutsche Bahn blocked off the former waiting room with steel plates in the spring of 2012. The demolition of the station building was considered and it was subsequently sold. A barrier-free upgrade of the station is currently being promoted by the city of Bad Honnef, which could be built on railway property on the side of the railway closest to the Rhine. However, it is not included in any federally-supported program and is therefore expected to be supported by the Zweckverband Nahverkehrs Rheinland (Rhineland local transport association) only in the medium term.

== Services ==
The station is served by RE8 services hourly. On working days, it is also served by RB27 services, which together provide a service every half-hour to Cologne and Rommerskirchen and to Koblenz.

| Line | Service | Route | Frequency |
|---|---|---|---|
| RE 8 | Rhein-Erft-Express | Mönchengladbach – Rheydt – Grevenbroich – Rommerskirchen – Cologne – Porz (Rhein) – Troisdorf – Bonn-Beuel – Rhöndorf – Linz (Rhein) - Neuwied - Koblenz Stadtmitte - Koblenz | Hourly |
| RB 27 | Rhein-Erft-Bahn | Mönchengladbach – Rheydt – Grevenbroich – Rommerskirchen – Cologne – Köln/Bonn Flughafen – Troisdorf – Bonn-Beuel – Rhöndorf – Linz (Rhein) - Neuwied - Koblenz-Ehrenbreitstein - Koblenz | Hourly |

== Noise barrier ==
In the spring of 2012, a new noise barrier was established on the western side of the station, which is being tested here for the first time worldwide. It is comparatively low, consists of aluminum and steel elements and can be retracted hydraulically.
