= Königswinter station =

Railway station in Königswinter, Germany

Königswinter
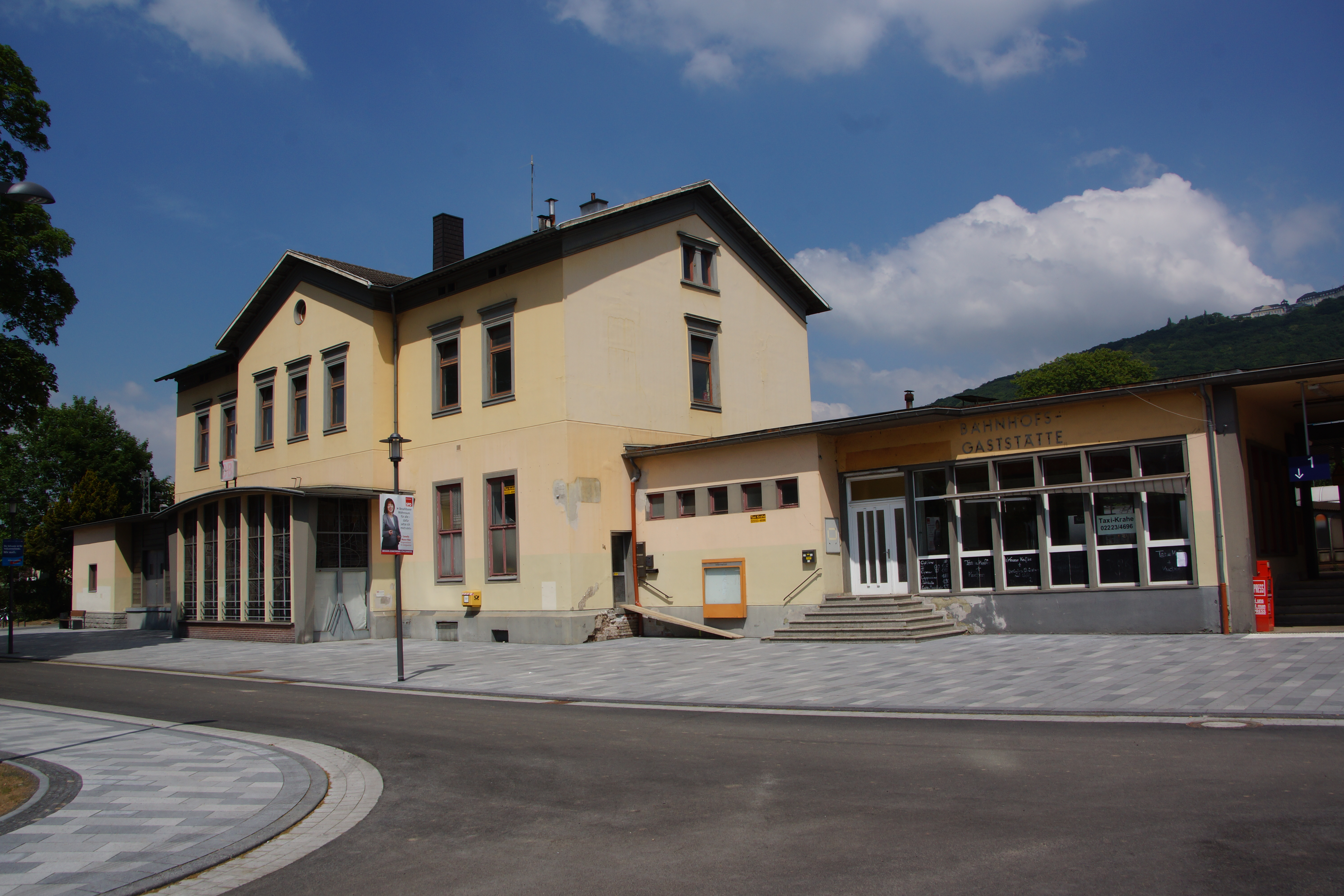

General information
- Location: Bahnhofsallee 14, Königswinter, NRW; Germany
- Coordinates: 50°40′43″N 7°11′35″E
- Line: East Rhine Railway (KBS 465)
- Platforms: 3

Construction
- Accessible: Platform 1 only

Other information
- Station code: 3360
- DS100 code: KWOW
- IBNR: 8003386
- Category: 4
- Fare zone: VRS: 2564
- Website: www.bahnhof.de

History
- Opened: 1870; 156 years ago

Services
| Preceding station | DB Regio NRW | Following station |
|---|---|---|
| Niederdollendorf towards Mönchengladbach Hbf | RE 8 | Rhöndorf towards Koblenz Hbf |
| Niederdollendorf towards Mönchengladbach Hbf | RB 27 | Rhöndorf towards Koblenz Hbf |
Location

Königswinter station is a station on the East Rhine Railway (German: Rechte Rheinstrecke) in the city of Königswinter in the Rhein-Sieg-Kreis district of North Rhine-Westphalia, Germany. It is a protected as a monument. The station was opened on 11 July 1870 as part of the extension of the East Rhine Railway from Neuwied to Oberkassel.

At its core the entrance building, which was built in 1869/70, is a 2 1/2-storey stucco building with neoclassical influences. It has an avant-corps with three portals, covered by a gable with an oeil-de-boeuf. The station is particularly notable for an iron and glass structure that provides covered access to the island platform. In the 1950s, a glass-enclosed porch and extensions were built on both sides the station building, which were designed as the station restaurant and for the handling of freight. At the same time the interior was also redesigned.

The station is classified by Deutsche Bahn as a category 4 station. The station building belonged to the city from 2004 and was sold at the end of 2012 to a real estate company. In 2019, it was adapted to be used for a bakery. The underpass connects the platform with Königswinter's old town to the west and to the premises of the Maxion company to the east.

| Line | Service | Route | Frequency |
|---|---|---|---|
| RE 8 | Rhein-Erft-Express | Mönchengladbach – Rheydt – Grevenbroich – Rommerskirchen – Cologne – Porz (Rhein) – Troisdorf – Königswinter – Linz (Rhein) - Neuwied - Koblenz Stadtmitte - Koblenz | Hourly |
| RB 27 | Rhein-Erft-Bahn | Mönchengladbach – Rheydt – Grevenbroich – Rommerskirchen – Cologne – Köln/Bonn Flughafen – Troisdorf – Königswinter – Linz (Rhein) - Neuwied - Koblenz-Ehrenbreitstein - Koblenz | Hourly |

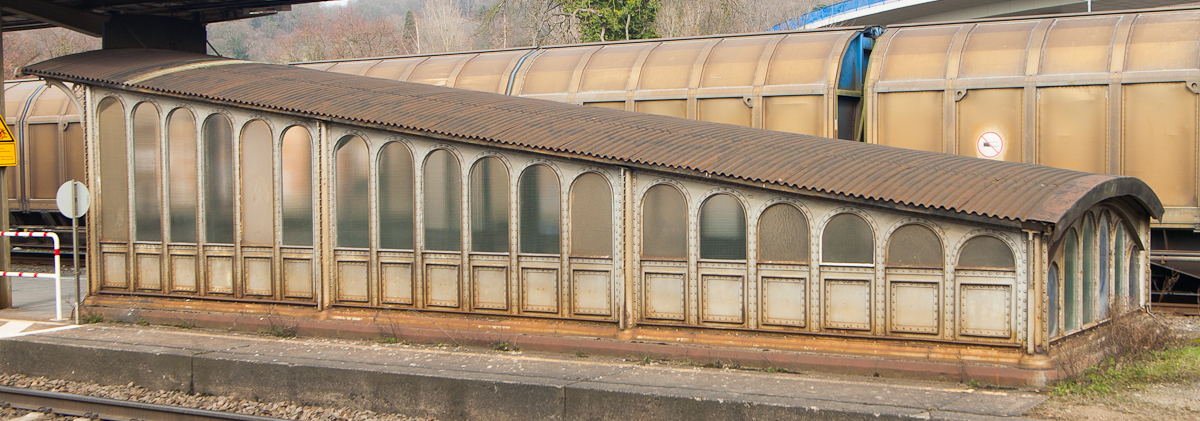
Platform access

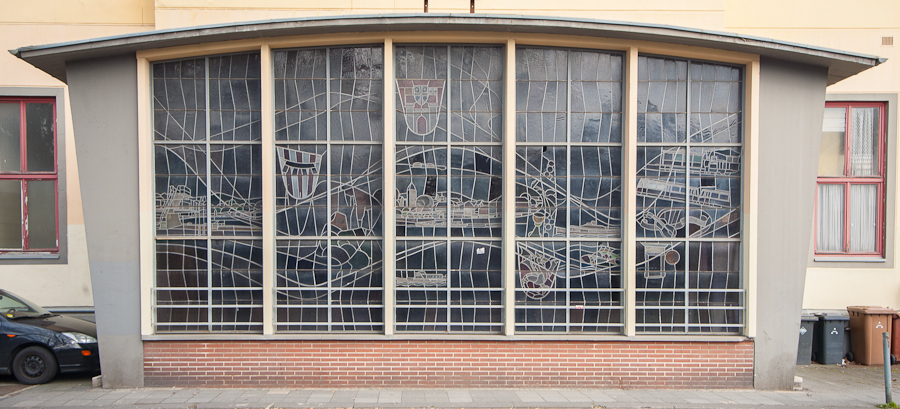
Glazed porch

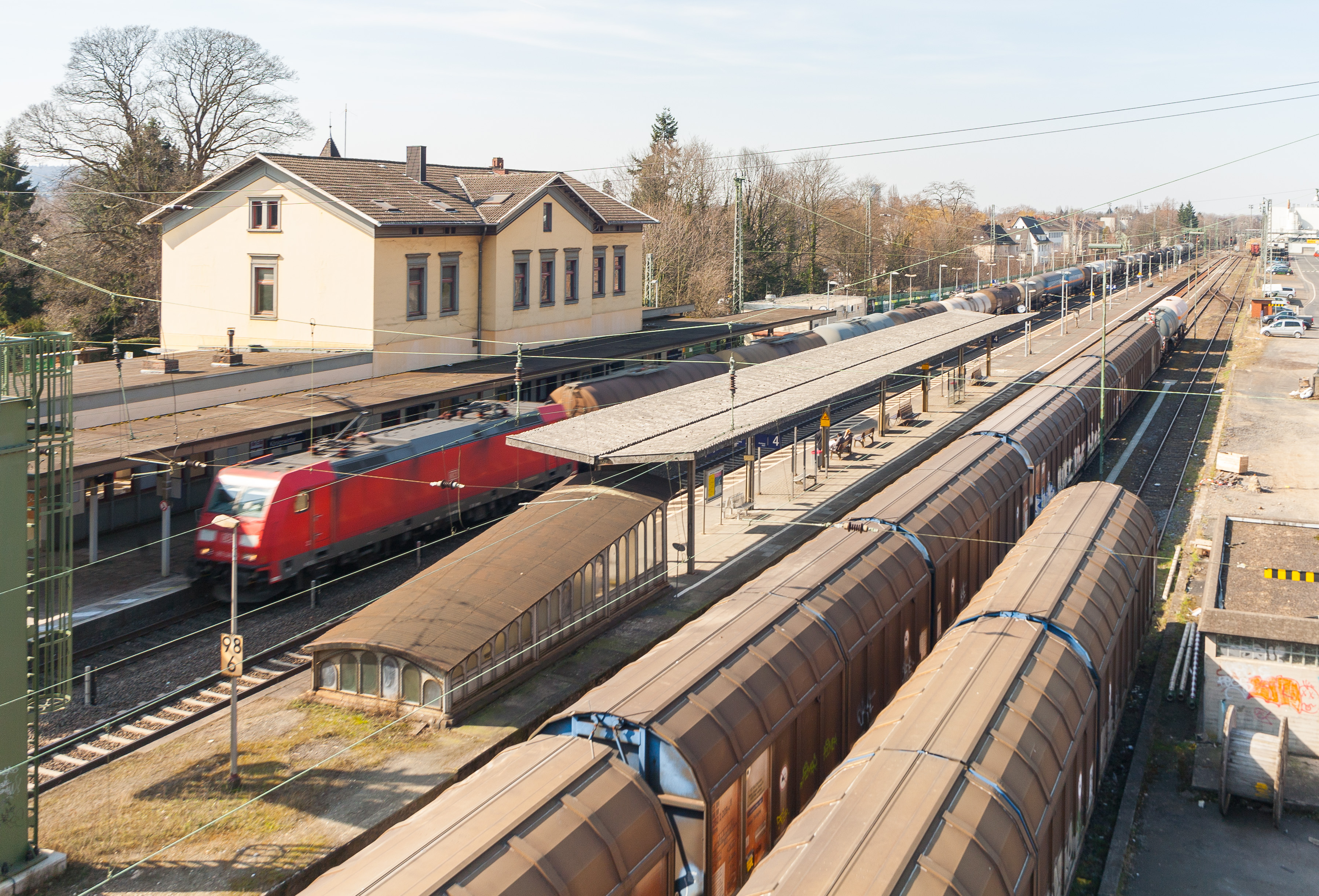
Overview
