= Bad Honnef (Rhein) station =

Railway station in Bad Honnef, Germany

Bad Honnef (Rhein)
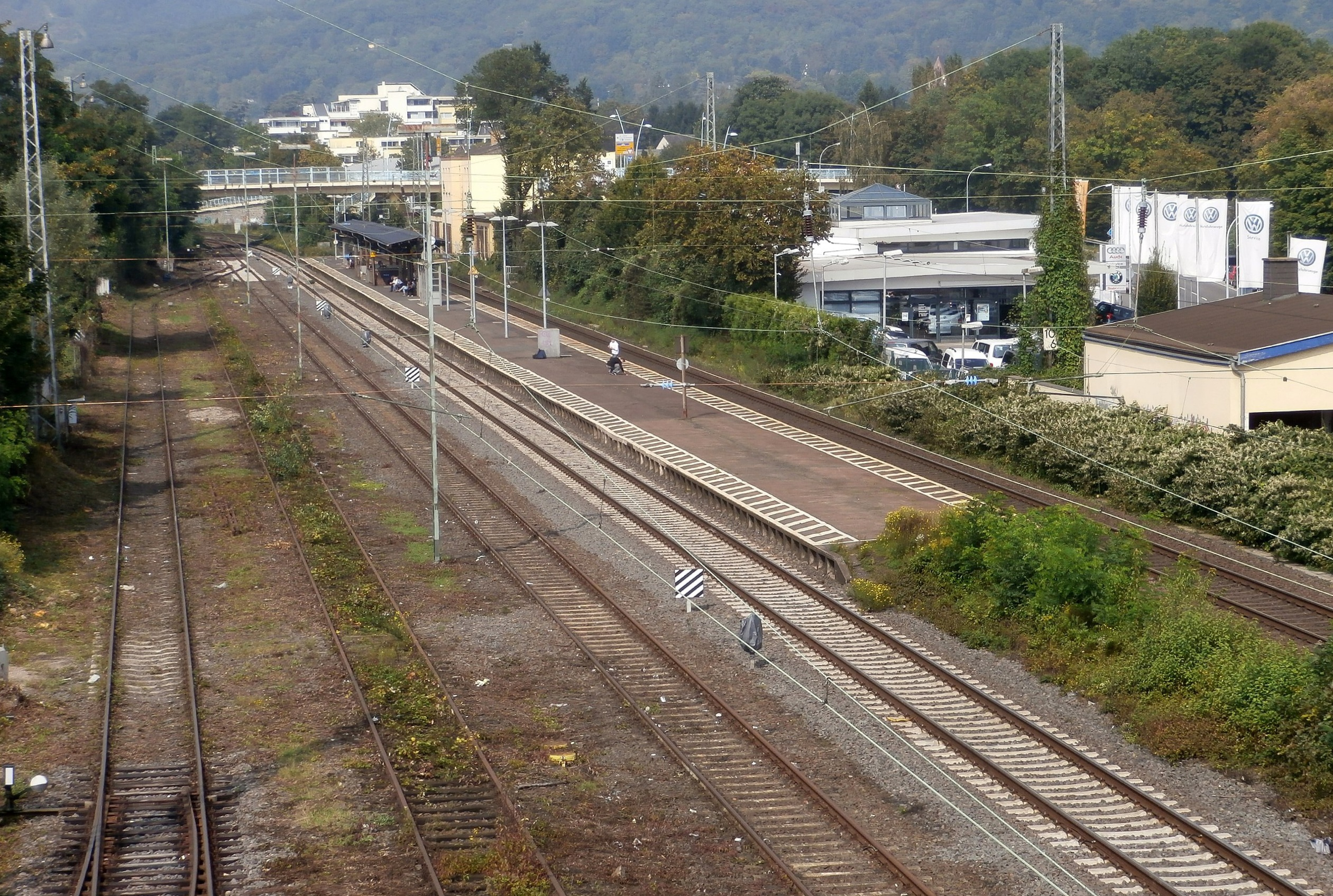
- Bad Honnef (Rhein) station

General information
- Location: August Lepper Str. 6, Bad Honnef, NRW; Germany
- Coordinates: 50°38′23″N 7°13′11″E
- Line: East Rhine Railway
- Platforms: 2

Construction
- Accessible: Yes

Other information
- Station code: 285
- DS100 code: KHBD
- IBNR: 8000713
- Category: 5
- Fare zone: VRS: 2561
- Website: www.bahnhof.de

History
- Opened: 11 July 1870

Services
Preceding station	DB Regio NRW	Following station
Rhöndorf towards Mönchengladbach Hbf	RE 8	Unkel towards Koblenz Hbf
Rhöndorf towards Mönchengladbach Hbf	RB 27	Unkel towards Koblenz Hbf
Location

Bad Honnef (Rhein) is a station on the East Rhine Railway in Bad Honnef, a town in the German state of North Rhine-Westphalia.

It was opened on 11 July 1870 during the extension of the East Rhine Railway from Neuwied to Oberkassel as a station with the name of Honnef (Rhein). In the course of the commissioning of the electronic interlocking on the Right Rhine line, the station was converted into a halt (Haltepunkt) with an Anschlussstelle (siding that is normally locked out of use) in August 2014.

== Location ==
The station is located on the western edge of Bad Honnef between Lohfelder Straße to the west and August-Lepper-Strasse and the parallel federal highway 42 to the east, near the Rhine bank in front of the island of Grafenwerth.

At its southern edge is a commercial area, to its north is a bridge structure called Honneferkreuz ("Honnef Cross"), which serves as an interchange with the B 42, which gives access for passengers to the station. There is a parking area at and below the bridge.

The station has an island platform, which is accessed by a subway with stairs from the entrance building. The entrance building is two-storeys, with a one-storey wing extending to the subway. The station is classified by Deutsche Bahn as Category 5.

== History ==
The original entrance building was built in a similar style to some of the neighbouring stations in neo-Classical forms and the entrance was bordered by a broad set of steps. During their visit to Bad Honnef, the Swedish king and queen, Oscar and Sophia, were received at the station in 1901. Opposite the station was a station hotel, which was demolished at the latest after the Second World War. In 1957, the station was extensively modified in anticipation of the electrification of the railway line (1958) with the entrance building losing its neo-classical style and the signal box being moved to a smaller building south of the station. After Honnef received the official prefix of Bad (spa) in 1960, the station was renamed Bad Honnef (Rhein) in 1964 or 1965.

In 1999, Deutsche Bahn closed its ticket office, which was initially taken over and operated by an agency, but was later closed. Around 2000, 1500 passengers frequented the station daily. For a number of years, the station building, which is no longer used for railway purposes, has served as the headquarters of a passenger transport company. In 2011, Deutsche Bahn sold it to the company. The new owner plans to demolish it and build a new railway station building in the long term. The station forecourt was extended in 2011/12 in two construction phases with the removal of the cobblestone pavers and the construction of a barrier-free bus stop. Recently, efforts have been made to upgrade the station and open a kiosk with ticket sales for regional transport and a postal agency. In the long term, the city plans to abandon the existing station location in favour of a new station at the end of the Stadtbahn (Siebengebirgsbahn) (as of 2016).

== Services ==
The station is served by RE8 services hourly. On working days, it is also served by RB27 services, which together provide a service every half-hour to Cologne and Rommerskirchen and to Koblenz.

Line	Line name	Route	Frequency
RE 8	Rhein-Erft-Express	Mönchengladbach – Rheydt-Odenkirchen – Grevenbroich – Rommerskirchen – Cologne – Porz (Rhein) – Bonn-Beuel – Rhöndorf – Bad Honnef (Rhein) – Linz (Rhein) – Neuwied – Koblenz Stadtmitte – Koblenz	Hourly
RB 27	Rhein-Erft-Bahn	Mönchengladbach – Rheydt-Odenkirchen – Grevenbroich – Rommerskirchen – Cologne – Cologne/Bonn Airport – Bonn-Beuel – Rhöndorf – Bad Honnef (Rhein) – Linz (Rhein) – Neuwied – Koblenz-Ehrenbreitstein – Koblenz	Hourly
