= Niederdollendorf station =

Railway station in Königswinter, Germany

Niederdollendorf
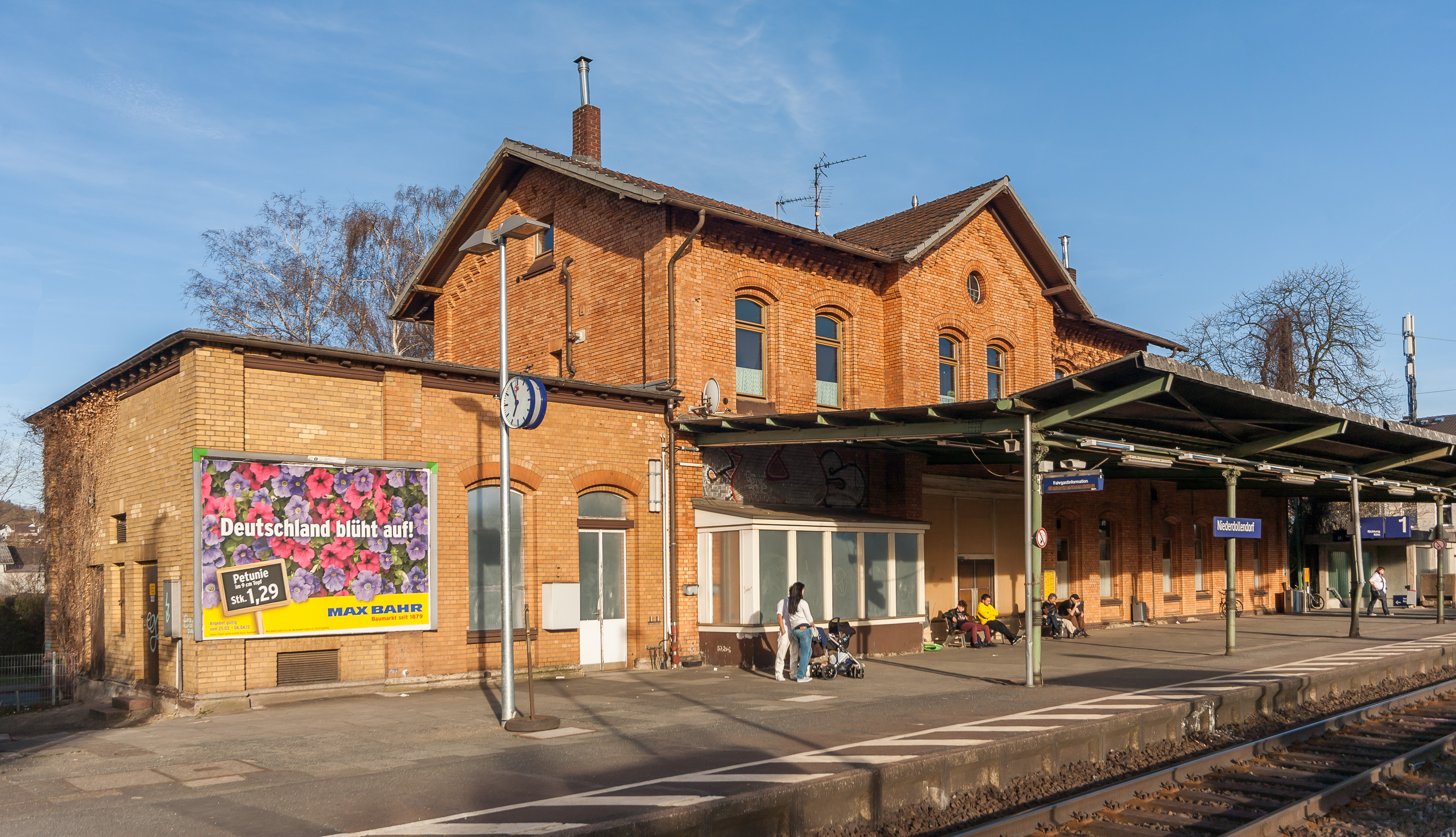

General information
- Location: Bachstr. 1, Niederdollendorf, Königswinter, NRW; Germany
- Coordinates: 50°41′43″N 7°10′52″E
- Line: East Rhine Railway (KBS 465)
- Platforms: 2

Construction
- Accessible: Platform 1 only

Other information
- Station code: 4488
- DS100 code: KND
- IBNR: 8004366
- Category: 5
- Fare zone: VRS: 2564
- Website: www.bahnhof.de

History
- Opened: 1870; 156 years ago

Services
Preceding station	DB Regio NRW	Following station
Bonn-Oberkassel towards Mönchengladbach Hbf	RE 8	Königswinter towards Koblenz Hbf
Bonn-Oberkassel towards Mönchengladbach Hbf	RB 27	Königswinter towards Koblenz Hbf
Location

Niederdollendorf railway station is a station on the East Rhine Railway (German: Rechte Rheinstrecke) in the Königswinter suburb of Niederdollendorf in the Rhein-Sieg-Kreis district of North Rhine-Westphalia, Germany. It is a protected as a monument. The station was opened on 11 July 1870 as part of the extension of the East Rhine Railway from Neuwied to Oberkassel.

At its core is the entrance building, which is a two-story brick building built in 1898. To its north and south it is bordered by single-storey extensions. The station restaurant is in the southern extension. The northern extension was built later to house rail services. The upper floor of the main building was designed to accommodate rail service apartments. The station has a gabled central avant-corps and the windows and the portals have rounded tops. The facades are decorated with cornices attached to the gable and terracotta friezes. The platform canopies have cast iron columns.

About 50 metres to the north of the station building is an operations building, which was built also of brick in 1910 for the handling of freight. The hip roof of the building is provided with dormers. Its knee wall is made of timber. The handling of freight at Niederdollendorf station was gradually abandoned in the 1940s and 1950s. It had been the terminus of the narrow-gauge Heisterbach Valley Railway, which closed in 1942.

The station is classified by Deutsche Bahn as a category 5 station. Oberdollendorf Stadtbahn station on the Siebengebirge Railway (part of the Bonn Stadtbahn) is about 200 metres to the east and, like Niederdollendorf station, it is on Heisterbacher Straße, enabling quick transfers.

The station is served hourly by Regional-Express service RE 8 (Rhein-Erft-Express) and Regionalbahn service RB 27 (Rhein-Erft-Bahn), which complement each another to provide an approximate half-hourly service.

Line	Service	Route	Frequency
RE 8	Rhein-Erft-Express	Mönchengladbach – Rheydt – Grevenbroich – Rommerskirchen – Cologne – Köln/Bonn Flughafen – Troisdorf – Niederdollendorf – Linz (Rhein) - Neuwied - Koblenz Stadtmitte - Koblenz	Hourly
RB 27	Rhein-Erft-Bahn	Mönchengladbach – Rheydt – Grevenbroich – Rommerskirchen – Cologne – Köln/Bonn Flughafen – Troisdorf – Niederdollendorf – Linz (Rhein) - Neuwied - Koblenz-Ehrenbreitstein - Koblenz	Hourly

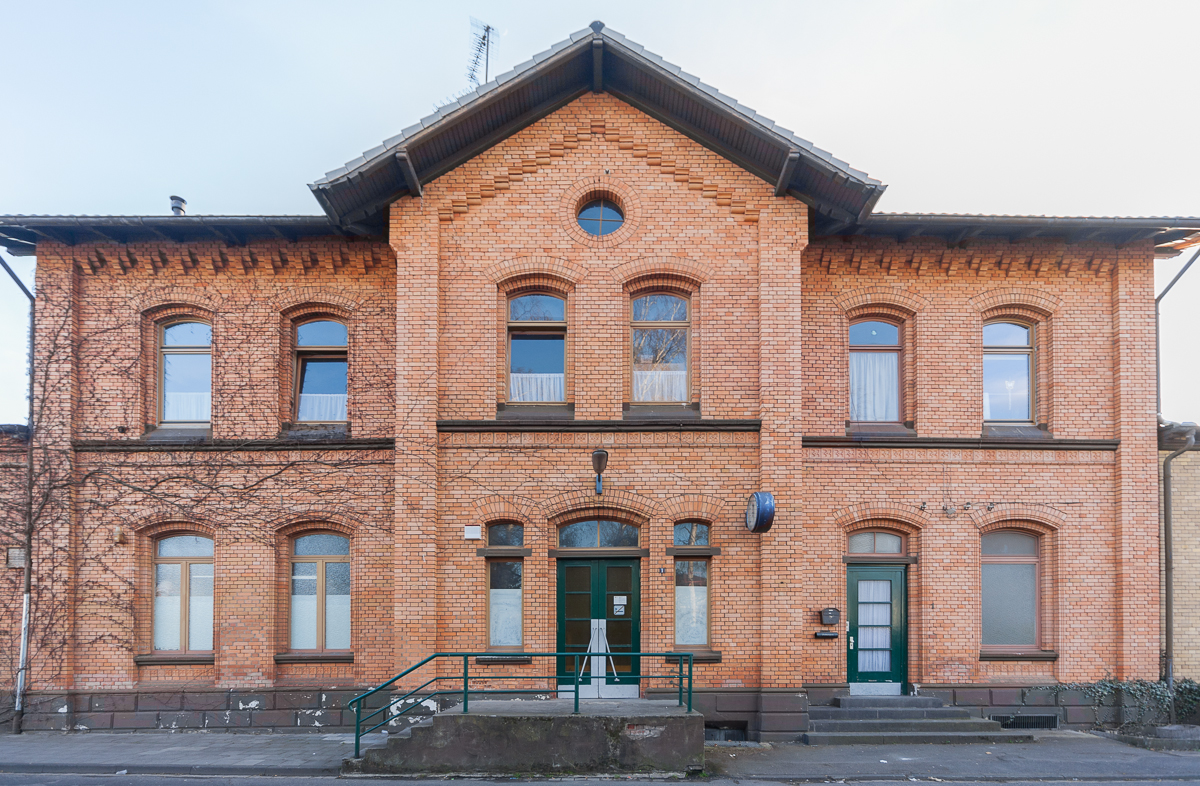
Street side of the entrance building

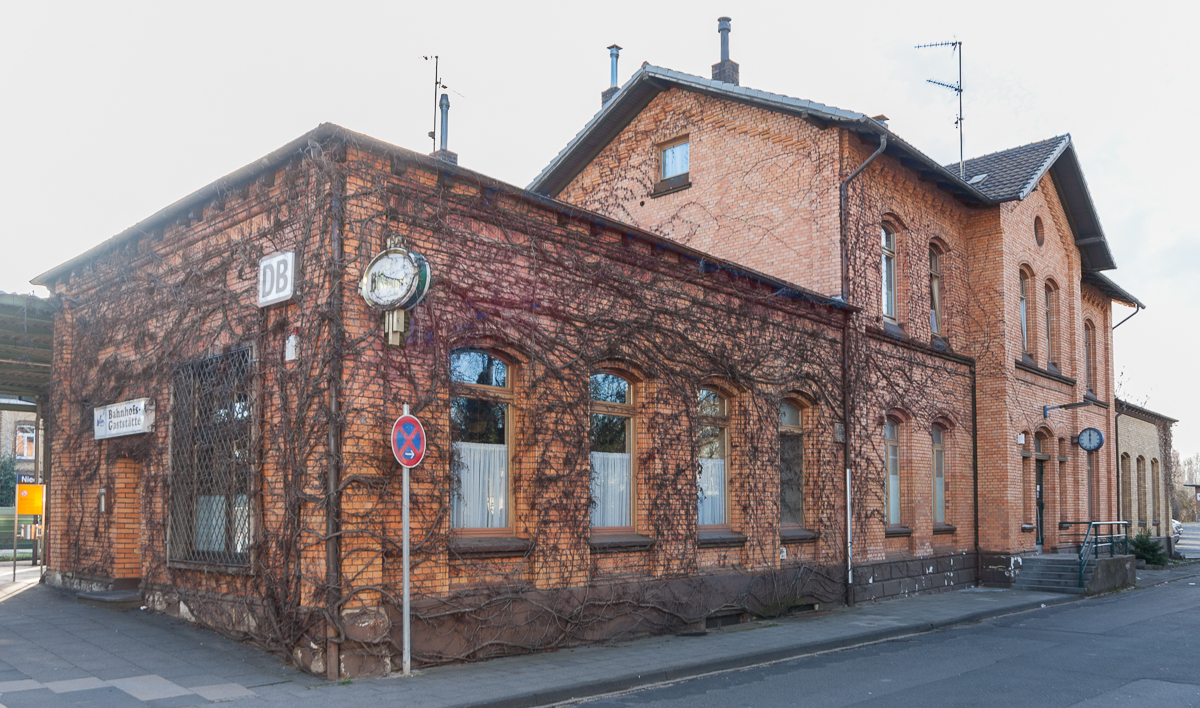
Street side of the entrance building (incl. station restaurant)
