= Bonn-Oberkassel station =

Railway station in Oberkassel, Germany

Bonn Oberkassel
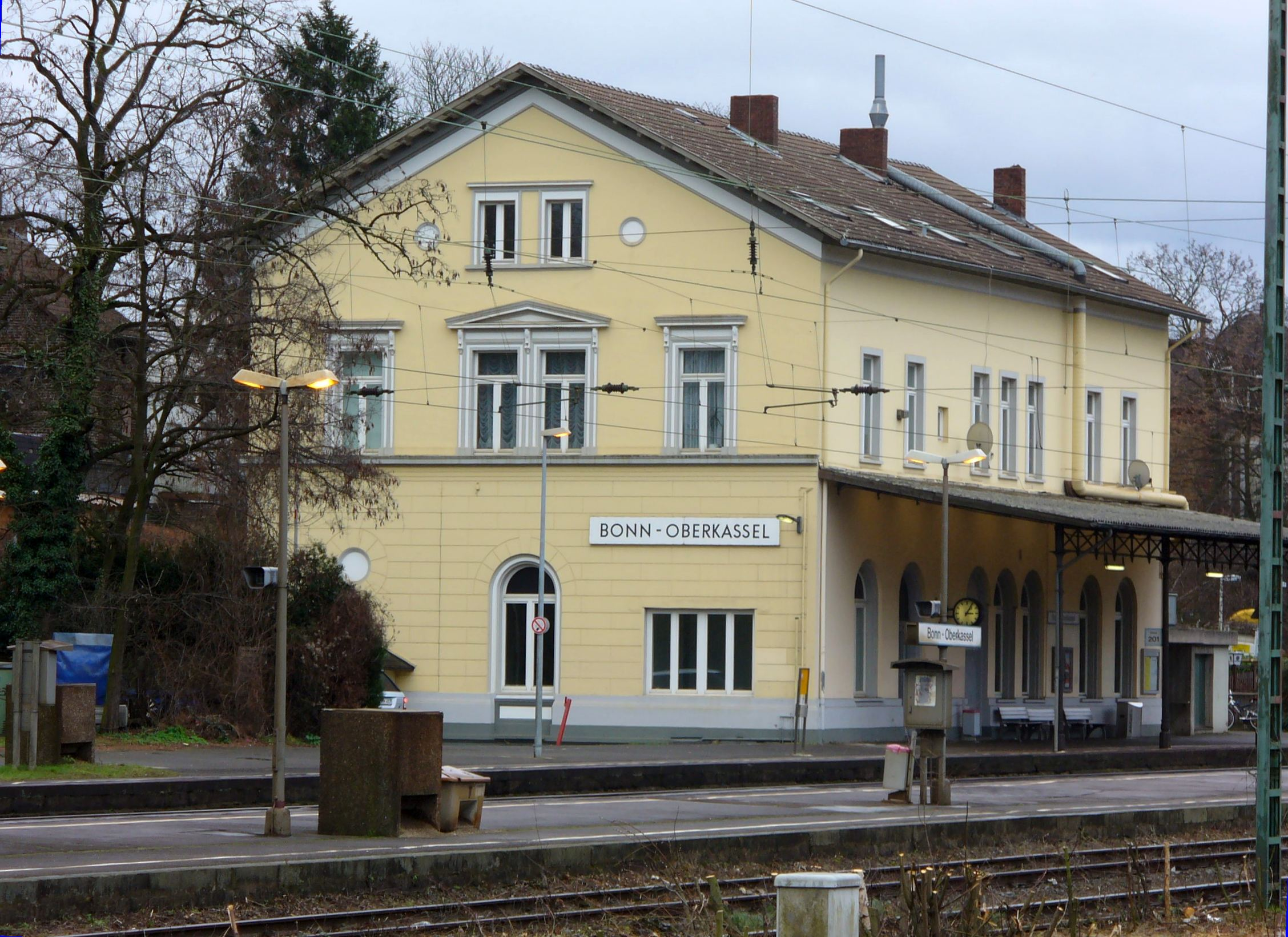
- Bonn-Oberkassel station in 2008

General information
- Location: Karl-Duwe-Str., Oberkassel, Bonn, NRW; Germany
- Coordinates: 50°42′53.9″N 7°9′33.3″E
- Lines: East Rhine Railway(KBS 465)
- Platforms: 2

Construction
- Accessible: Platform 1 only

Other information
- Station code: 772
- DS100 code: KBO
- IBNR: 8001086
- Category: 5
- Fare zone: VRS: 2600
- Website: www.bahnhof.de

History
- Opened: 11 July 1870

Services
Preceding station	DB Regio NRW	Following station
Bonn-Beuel towards Mönchengladbach Hbf	RE 8	Niederdollendorf towards Koblenz Hbf
Bonn-Beuel towards Mönchengladbach Hbf	RB 27	Niederdollendorf towards Koblenz Hbf
Location
- Location within North Rhine-Westphalia

Bonn-Oberkassel station is on the East Rhine Railway (German: Rechte Rheinstrecke) in the suburb of Oberkassel in the Bonn district of Beuel in the German state of North Rhine-Westphalia.

== History ==
The station was opened on 11 July 1870 in the course of extending the East Rhine line from Neuwied to Oberkassel and at the same time as the establishment of the Bonn–Oberkassel train ferry.

After the closure of the train ferry in 1919, the station retained its function, since it continued to handle the freight of a cement factory. In addition, it was used by a shipyard newly established in the train ferry precinct.

With the decline and final closing down of the cement factory in 1987, the station's freight facilities (several sidings and loading ramps) also lost their importance. Today, of the formerly large field of railway tracks at the station only the two tracks on the East Rhine line are used for freight and commuter trains. The remaining tracks were removed in 2008 along with the overhead line equipment. The historic station building is a heritage listed building and is used as a private residence and for offices and a restaurant.

== Passenger services ==
The station is classified by Deutsche Bahn as a category 5 station. It is served hourly by Regional-Express service RE 8 (Rhein-Erft-Express) and Regionalbahn service RB 27 (Rhein-Erft-Bahn), which complement each another to provide an approximate half-hourly service. Near the railway station is the Oberkassel Nord tram and Stadtbahn station, which provides a connection to Bonn Hauptbahnhof.

Line	Service	Route	Frequency
RE 8	Rhein-Erft-Express	Mönchengladbach – Rheydt – Cologne – Porz (Rhein) – Troisdorf – Bonn-Oberkassel – Linz (Rhein) - Neuwied - Koblenz Stadtmitte - Koblenz	Hourly
RB 27	Rhein-Erft-Bahn	(Mönchengladbach – Rheydt –) Cologne – Köln/Bonn Flughafen – Troisdorf – Bonn-Oberkassel – Linz (Rhein) - Neuwied - Koblenz-Ehrenbreitstein - Koblenz	Hourly

== Planning ==
The planned extension of S-Bahn line 13 from Troisdorf to Oberkassel (connecting to Cologne/Bonn Airport at 20-minute intervals) will increase the importance of the station. This plan requires the construction of additional tracks and a turn-back facility for S-Bahn trains, involving extensive work. According to Deutsche Bahn's plans, construction is to begin in early 2017. Since the trains of the East Rhine railway are planned to run on schedule during the construction period, a construction period of twelve years is estimated. The route is due to be finished in 2030. On the section between Troisdorf and Bonn-Beuel, S-Bahn services are planned to commence at the end of 2026.
