= Bonn-Beuel station =

Railway station in Bonn, Germany

Bonn Beuel
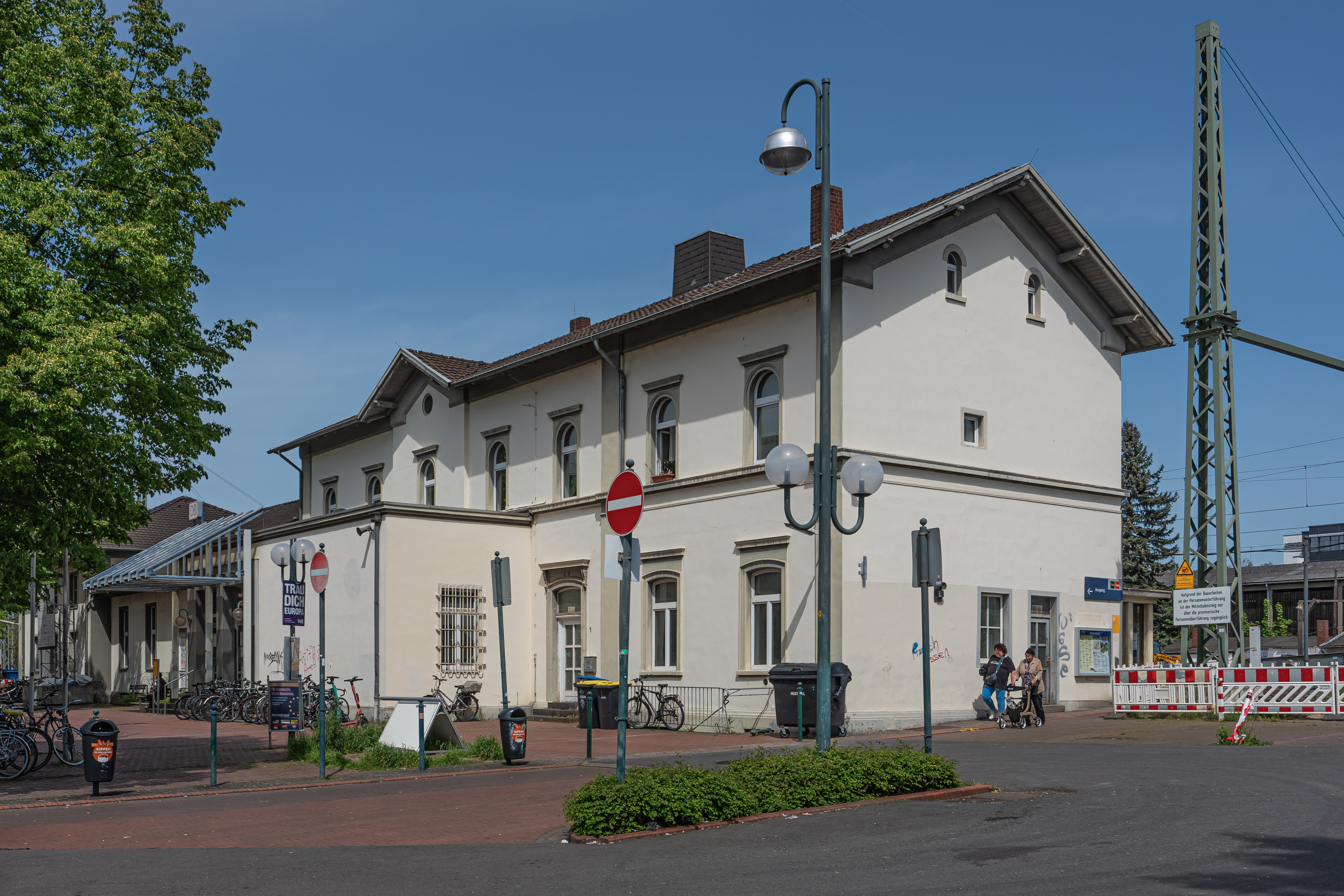
- View of the station in 2024

General information
- Location: Bahnhofsplatz 2, Beuel, Bonn, NRW; Germany
- Coordinates: 50°44′18.4″N 7°7′38.7″E
- Lines: East Rhine Railway(KBS 465); Beuel–Großenbusch Light Railway
- Platforms: 3

Construction
- Accessible: No

Other information
- Station code: 769
- DS100 code: KBB
- IBNR: 8001083
- Category: 4
- Fare zone: VRS: 2600
- Website: www.bahnhof.de

History
- Opened: 1 March 1871

Services
Preceding station	DB Regio NRW	Following station
Menden (Rheinl) towards Mönchengladbach Hbf	RE 8	Bonn-Oberkassel towards Koblenz Hbf
Menden (Rheinl) towards Mönchengladbach Hbf	RB 27	Bonn-Oberkassel towards Koblenz Hbf
Preceding station	Straßenbahn Bonn	Following station
Obere Wilhelmstraße towards Dottendorf	Line 62	Limperich Nord towards Oberkassel Süd/Römlinghoven
Obere Wilhelmstraße towards Kopenhagener Straße	Line 65	Limperich Nord towards Ramersdorf
Location
- Location within North Rhine-Westphalia

Bonn-Beuel station is on the East Rhine Railway in the Bonn district of Beuel in the German state of North Rhine-Westphalia.

== Infrastructure ==
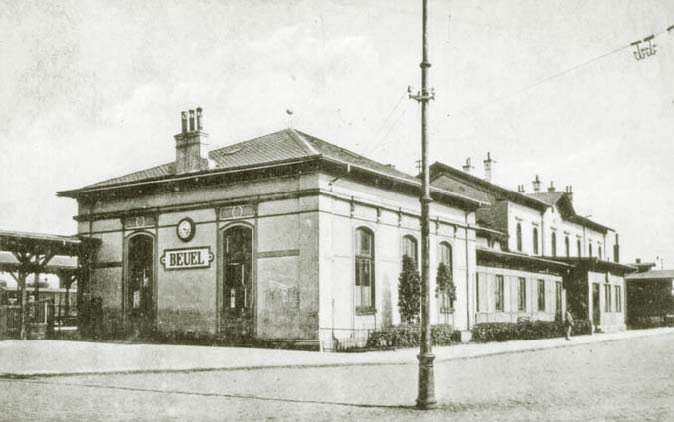
View of the station, about 1900

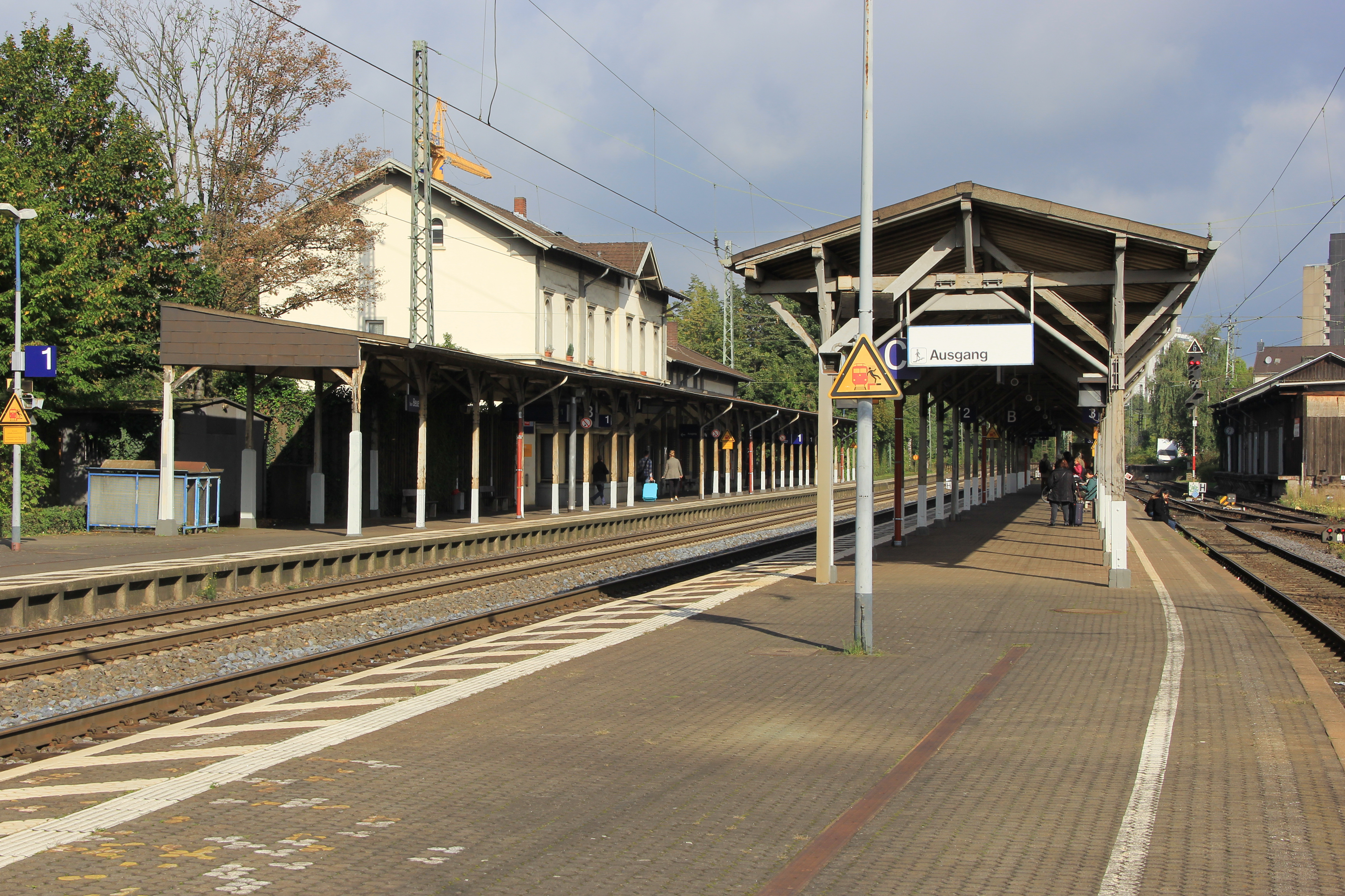
Track side (2015)

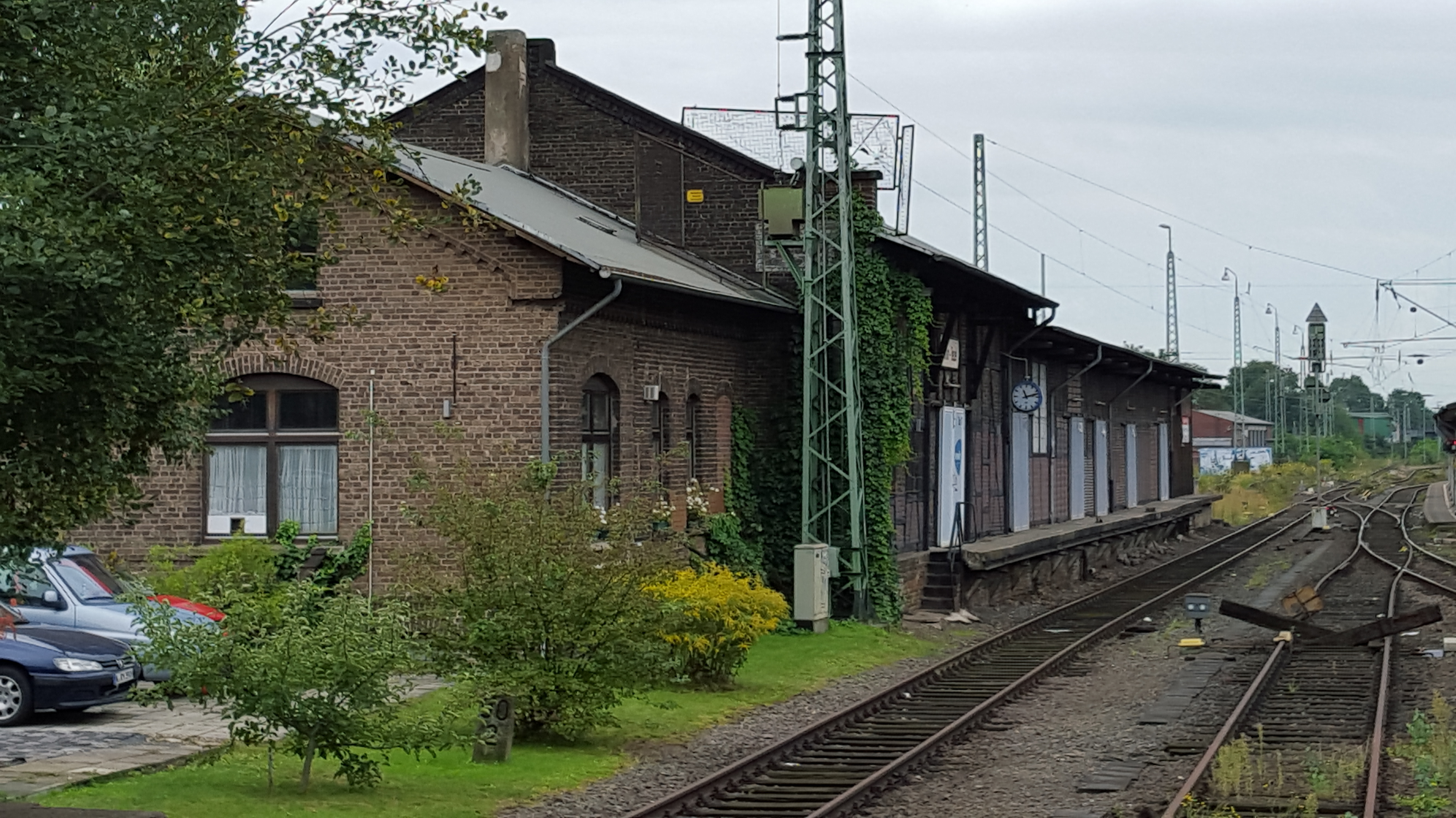
Freight yard with siding (2015)

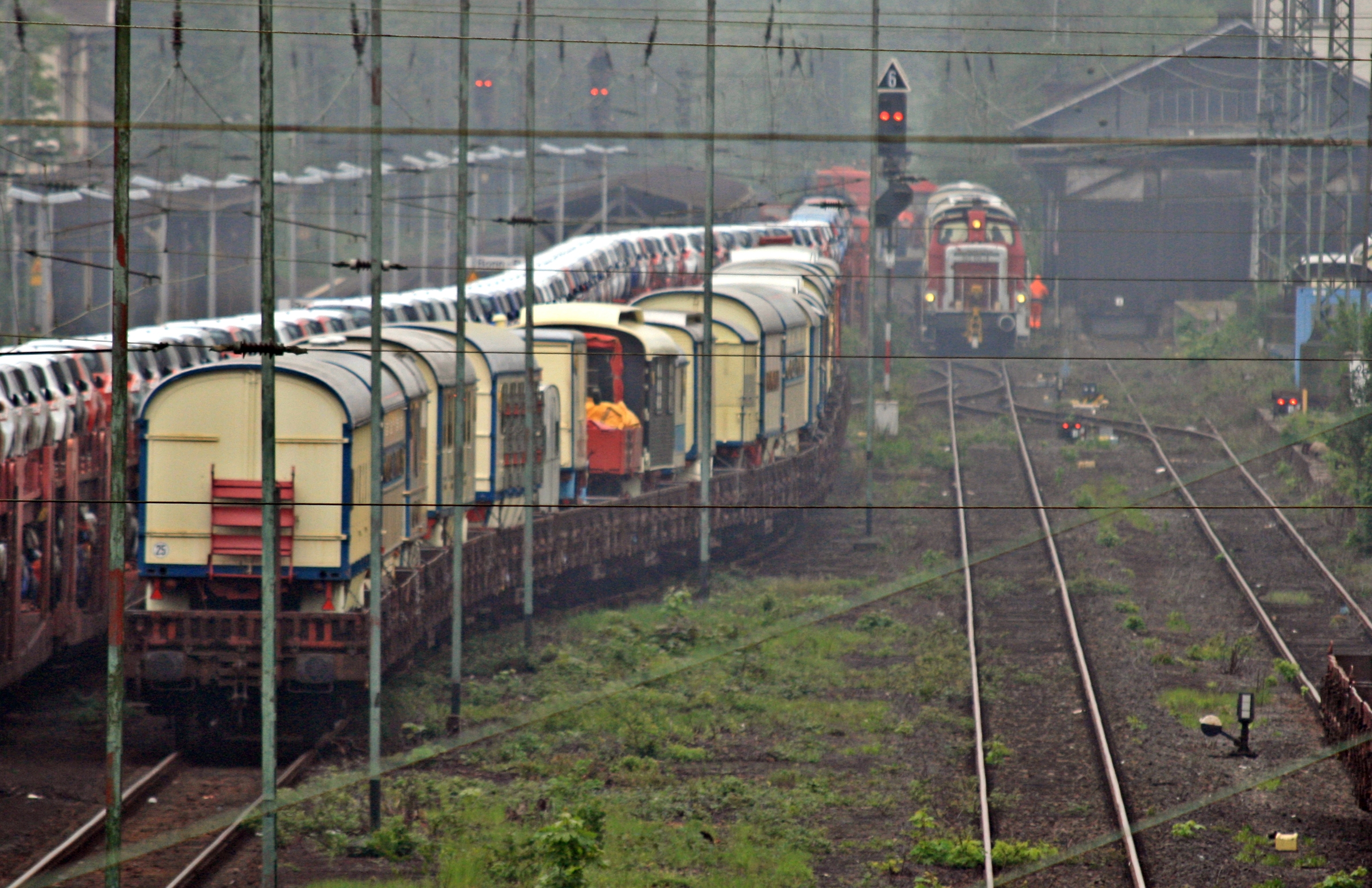
Circus traffic (2011)

The station was opened on 1 March 1871 and has three platform tracks and several sidings. Somewhat hidden from the station building, there are some tracks which are used by the Rhein-Sieg-Eisenbahn for special passenger services, especially during the Pützchen's market (a five or six day fair usually held in September). In addition, there is also a freight shed at the station. It, including its unloading and loading roads, as well as the entrance building, the two platforms and the platform canopy are heritage-listed.

The station has some special features compared to neighbouring stations. The extensive track layout for local freight transport (which was usual for German stations until the 1980s) have not been removed in Beuel but are almost completely preserved and operational. For example, the freight shed can still be reached via its access road, which is very rare for stations of this category in Germany. It is also unusual that the other loading tracks (including the head and side loading ramps) are still ready for use and can be reached both by road and rail. Private railway companies and the DB itself regularly use this infrastructure, which is now unique in the region; for example, the Circus Roncalli uses Beuel station during its visits to Bonn. Container goods, wood and railway gravel, among other things, are loaded at Beuel station.

While the staffed signal boxes on the Right Rhine line north and south of Beuel were closed in 2011 and replaced by electronic interlockings, the signal box in Beuel station remains operational and is still permanently occupied by a dispatcher. This relatively modern signal box south of the entrance building replaced two existing signal boxes in 1985 (one in the area of the freight yard and a dispatcher box next to the bridge on auf dem Grendt street).

== Services ==
The station is classified by Deutsche Bahn as a category 4 station. It is served hourly by Regional-Express service RE 8 (Rhein-Erft-Express) and Regionalbahn service RB 27 (Rhein-Erft-Bahn), which complement each another to provide an approximate half-hourly service. If long-distance passenger trains are diverted from the West Rhine Railway to the East Rhine line, Bonn-Beuel station serves Bonn in place of Bonn Hauptbahnhof.

There is a stop in front of the station serving tram line 62 of the Bonn Stadtbahn, which runs through Beuel to Bonn city centre, Bonn Hauptbahnhof and Dottendorf and in the other direction through Ramersdorf to Oberkassel.

Line	Service	Route	Frequency
RE 8	Rhein-Erft-Express	Mönchengladbach – Rheydt – Grevenbroich – Rommerskirchen – Cologne – Porz (Rhein) – Troisdorf – Bonn-Beuel – Linz (Rhein) - Neuwied - Koblenz Stadtmitte - Koblenz	Hourly
RB 27	Rhein-Erft-Bahn	Mönchengladbach – Rheydt – Grevenbroich – Rommerskirchen – Cologne – Köln/Bonn Flughafen – Troisdorf – Bonn-Beuel – Linz (Rhein) - Neuwied - Koblenz-Ehrenbreitstein - Koblenz	Hourly

== Planning ==
After 20 years of planning and discussion, preparatory work began in the autumn of 2016 to extend S-Bahn line 13 (Cologne–Troisdorf) to Bonn-Oberkassel. The completion of all work is planned for 2027. In the course of this work, Beuel station will receive two additional suburban tracks, but it will also lose all of its freight tracks. As a result, Bonn is losing its last interface between rail and road; local rail freight operations, as practiced at the moment, will no longer be possible. Half of the freight yard building is to be demolished, the remainder is to be moved 1.8 metres to the east. Monumental protection, however, obliges DB to deal with the legally required, but expensive "translocation" by terminating the tenancy of the freight yard, thus deliberately creating a business-destroying vacancy. The remaining part of the freight shed will not receive a new operating track, so it will lose its technical and historical function. The modernisation of the tracks and station installations will also cause the loss of the characteristic (and only rarely so well preserved) platform canopy. This was also popular as a setting for film shoots.
