= RE8 (disambiguation) =

RE8 or RE 8 could refer to:

- Resident Evil Village, a video game, also known as Resident Evil 8
- the Rhein-Erft-Express (RE 8), a rail service in Germany
- Royal Aircraft Factory R.E.8, a British biplane
- RE8 experiment, a CERN experiment
