= Rheydt Hauptbahnhof =

Railway station in Mönchengladbach, Germany

Rheydt Hbf
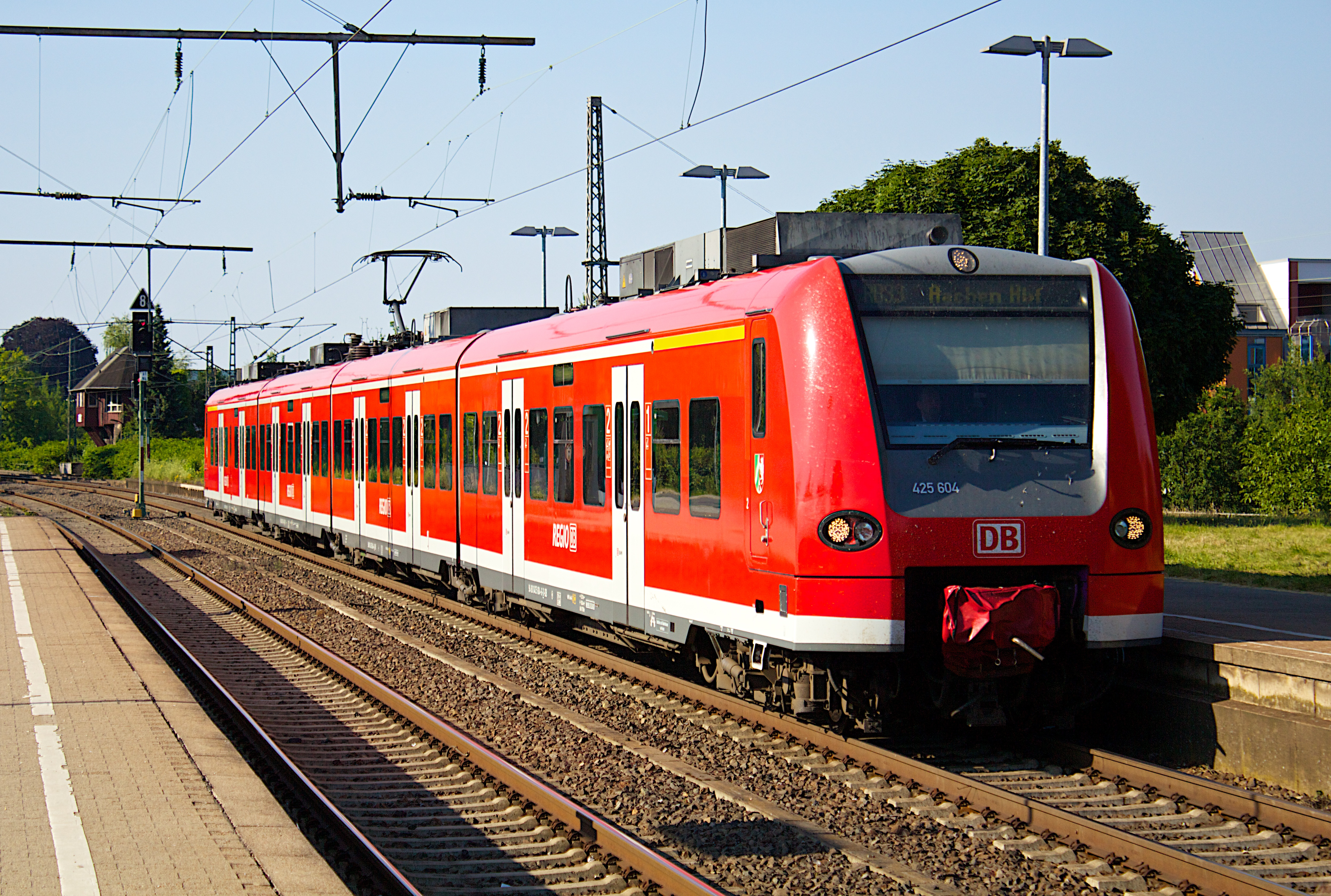

General information
- Location: Rheydt, Mönchengladbach, NRW; Germany
- Coordinates: 51°09′47″N 6°26′23″E
- Lines: Aachen–Mönchengladbach (KBS 485); Rheydt–Köln-Ehrenfeld (KBS 465); Iron Rhine (KBS 487)
- Platforms: 4

Construction
- Accessible: Yes (except platform 1)

Other information
- Station code: 5260
- DS100 code: KRY
- IBNR: 8000318
- Category: 4
- Fare zone: VRR: 502; VRS: 1500 (VRR transitional zone)
- Website: www.bahnhof.de

History
- Opened: 1852

Services
Preceding station	DB Fernverkehr	Following station
Erkelenz towards Aachen Hbf	ICE 10	Mönchengladbach Hbf One-way operation
Erkelenz towards Aachen Hbf	ICE 14	Mönchengladbach Hbf towards Berlin Ostbahnhof
Preceding station	DB Regio NRW	Following station
Rheydt-Odenkirchen towards Koblenz Hbf	RE 8	Mönchengladbach Hbf Terminus
Rheydt-Odenkirchen towards Koblenz Hbf	RB 27	Mönchengladbach Hbf Terminus
Wickrath towards Aachen Hbf	RB 33	Mönchengladbach Hbf towards Essen-Steele
Preceding station	National Express Germany	Following station
Erkelenz towards Aachen Hbf	RE 4 (Wupper-Express)	Mönchengladbach Hbf towards Dortmund Hbf
Preceding station	VIAS	Following station
Mönchengladbach-Rheindahlen towards Dalheim	RB 34	Mönchengladbach Hbf Terminus
Location

Rheydt Hauptbahnhof is a railway station in Mönchengladbach, Germany. Mönchengladbach is the only city in Germany that has two stations called Hauptbahnhof, due to the merger of the city of Rheydt into Mönchengladbach in the late 1970s.

== Rheydt Hbf and Mönchengladbach ==
After the merging of the two cities, the station was not renamed to Mönchengladbach-Rheydt as in all other cases where cities were merged in the 1970s. The Deutsche Bundesbahn retained the name (and the name of suburban stops such as Rheydt-Odenkirchen); Mönchengladbach has two "main stations", Mönchengladbach Hauptbahnhof and Rheydt Hauptbahnhof.

== Operational usage ==
The station is served by the following lines:

- Aachen – Mönchengladbach (KBS 485)
- Rheydt – Köln-Ehrenfeld (KBS 465)
- Rheydt – Dalheim (– Antwerpen) (KBS 487)

Only regional services call at the station. It is at the southwestern border of the Verkehrsverbund Rhein-Ruhr, with services extending into the area of the Aachener Verkehrsverbund.

Line	Line name	Route
RE 4	Wupper-Express	Aachen – Herzogenrath – Geilenkirchen – Rheydt – Mönchengladbach – Düsseldorf – Wuppertal – Hagen – Dortmund
RE 8	Rhein-Erft-Express	Mönchengladbach – Rheydt – Grevenbroich – Rommerskirchen – Cologne – Troisdorf – Bonn-Beuel – Linz (Rhein) – Neuwied – Engers – Koblenz-Ehrenbreitstein – Koblenz
RB 27	Rhein-Erft-Bahn	Mönchengladbach – Rheydt – Grevenbroich – Rommerskirchen – Cologne – Cologne/Bonn Airport – Troisdorf – Bonn-Beuel – Linz (Rhein) – Neuwied – Engers – Koblenz-Ehrenbreitstein – Koblenz
RB 33	Rhein-Niers-Bahn	Aachen – Herzogenrath – Übach-Palenberg – Geilenkirchen – Hückelhoven-Baal – Rheydt – Mönchengladbach – Viersen – Krefeld – Rheinhausen – Duisburg – Mülheim – Essen
RB 34	Schwalm-Nette-Bahn	Mönchengladbach – Rheydt – Wegberg – Dalheim
