= Limperich Nord station =

Tram stop in Bonn, Germany

Limperich Nord
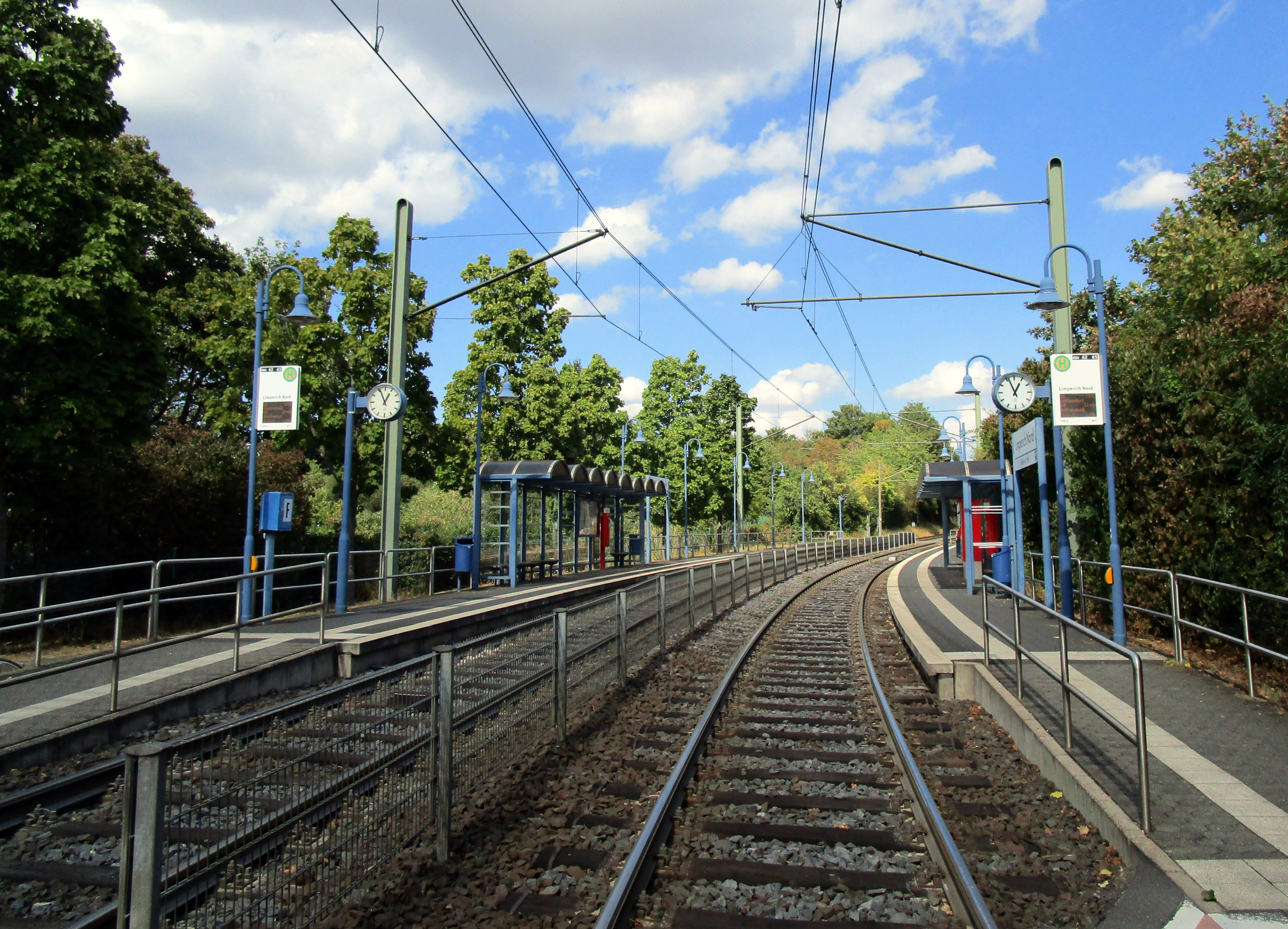
- The station platforms in 2022

General information
- Location: Beuel, North Rhine-Westphalia; Germany
- Coordinates: 50°43′48″N 7°07′55″E
- Owner: Stadtwerke Bonn
- Platforms: 2 side platforms
- Tracks: 2
- Train operators: Stadtwerke Bonn

History
- Opened: 28 May 2000

Services
Preceding station	Straßenbahn Bonn	Following station
Bonn-Beuel towards Dottendorf	Line 62	Limperich towards Oberkassel Süd/Römlinghoven
Bonn-Beuel towards Kopenhagener Straße	Line 65	Limperich towards Ramersdorf
Location

Limperich Nord is a Bonn Stadtbahn tram stop served by lines 62 and 65 in the district of Bonn Beuel. It opened on 28 May 2000.
