= Grevenbroich station =

Railway station in Grevenbroich, Germany

Grevenbroich
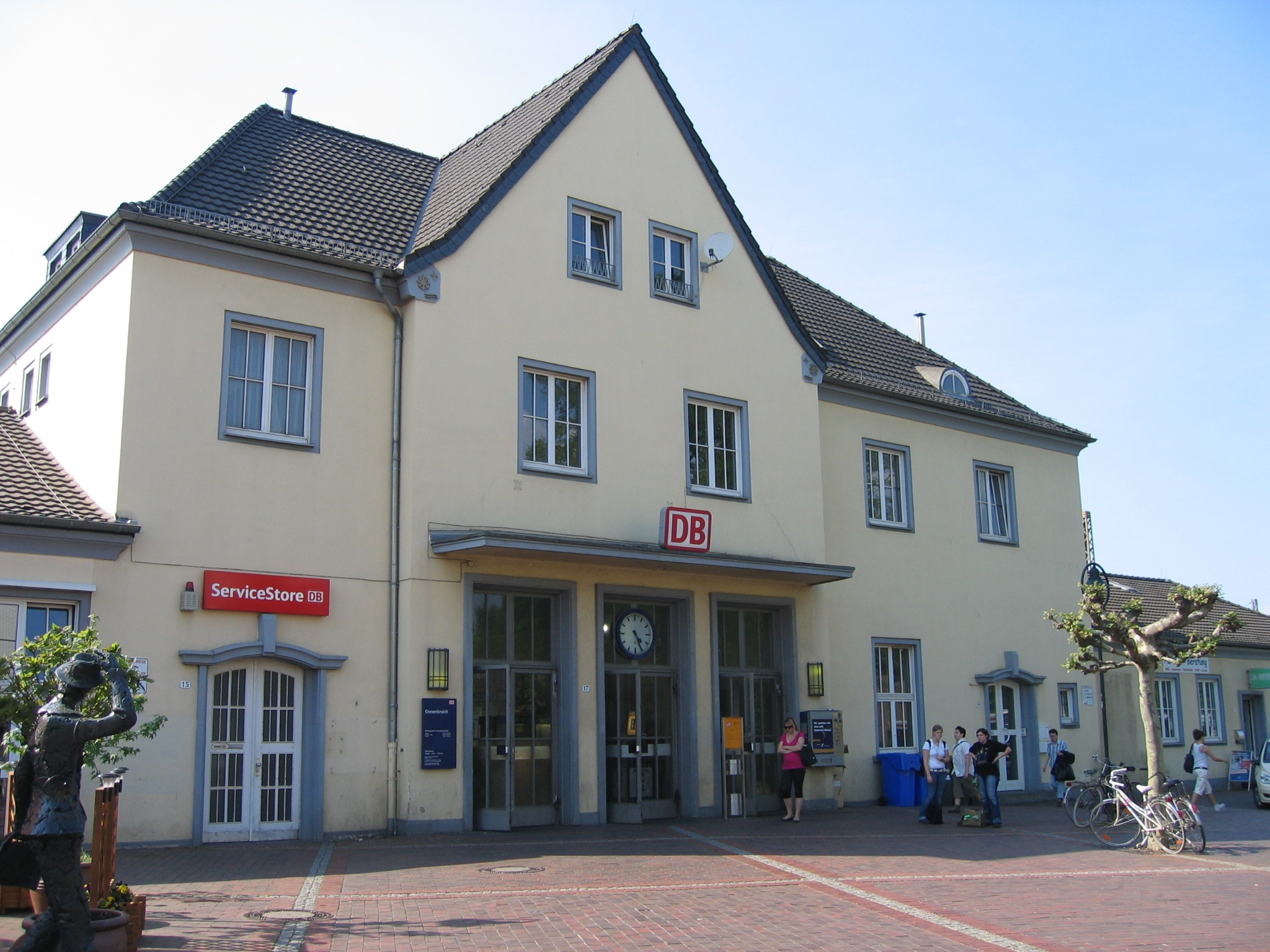
- Entrance from the station forecourt (April 2007)

General information
- Location: Bahnhofsvorplatz 17, Grevenbroich, NRW; Germany
- Coordinates: 51°5′35″N 6°34′50″E
- Lines: Rheydt–Cologne–Ehrenfeld; Düren–Neuss
- Platforms: 4

Construction
- Accessible: Yes

Other information
- Station code: 2263
- DS100 code: KGRB
- IBNR: 8000133
- Category: 4
- Fare zone: VRR: 610; VRS: 1610 (VRR transitional tariff)
- Website: www.bahnhof.de

History
- Opened: 1 September 1869

Services
Preceding station	DB Regio NRW	Following station
Jüchen towards Mönchengladbach Hbf	RE 8	Rommerskirchen towards Koblenz Hbf
Jüchen towards Mönchengladbach Hbf	RB 27	Rommerskirchen towards Koblenz Hbf
Preceding station	VIAS	Following station
Gustorf towards Bedburg	RB 39	Kapellen-Wevelinghoven towards Düsseldorf Hbf
Location
- Location within North Rhine-Westphalia

Grevenbroich station is a junction station in the city of Grevenbroich in the German state of North Rhine-Westphalia. It is located at the junction of the Cologne–Mönchengladbach railway and the Düren–Neuss railway. It is classified by Deutsche Bahn as a category 4 station.

With stops by Busverkehr Rheinland (BVR, a bus operator owned by Deutsche Bahn) in the five bays of the bus station in the station forecourt, Grevenbroich station is the transport hub of Grevenbroich.

== History ==
The first entrance building of Grevenbroich station was demolished after the Second World War, probably as a result of war damage. It was replaced by the existing station building.

The area of the former goods yard, which lay to the west of the platforms, has been reduced dramatically in recent years, so that today it is no longer used. Only a large brownfield area indicates its former size.

With the commissioning of electronic interlocking at Grevenbroich on the Rheydt-Ehrenfeld route in 2007, the Gnf and Gs signal boxes were closed, but they still exist.

The station was partially restored in the period from July to September 2012. A new floor covering with a tactile guidance system for the visually impaired and blind was installed and the entrance area was renovated. The middle entrance door was replaced by an automatically opening door, it allows wheelchair users and people with restricted mobility to enter the station. Deutsche Bahn invested about €300,000 for this project.

== Operations ==
Grevenbroich station is served by the following three services:

Line	Line name	Route	Frequency
RE 8	Rhein-Erft-Express	Mönchengladbach – Grevenbroich – Rommerskirchen – Cologne – Porz (Rhein) – Troisdorf – Bonn-Beuel – Linz (Rhein) – Neuwied – Koblenz Stadtmitte – Koblenz	Hourly
RB 27	Rhein-Erft-Bahn	Mönchengladbach – Grevenbroich – Rommerskirchen – Cologne – Cologne/Bonn Airport – Troisdorf – Bonn-Beuel – Linz (Rhein) – Neuwied – Engers – Koblenz-Ehrenbreitstein – Koblenz	Hourly
RB 39	Düssel-Erft-Bahn	Düsseldorf – Neuss – Grevenbroich – Bedburg (Erft)	Every 30 mins (Düsseldorf–Grevenbroich); every 60 mins (Grevenbroich–Bedburg (Erft))

=== Planning ===
There were plans to replace the former RB 38 service (which ran from Cologne to Düsseldorf via Horrem, Bedburg and Grevenbroich) by a new Rhine-Ruhr S-Bahn line S 18, which would have involved electrifying the Düren–Neuss railway through Grevenbroich station, although this plan is not currently being pursued for the section north of Bedburg. The section from Bedburg to Düsseldorf has been separated and now operates as the Düssel-Erft-Bahn, which has been renumbered as the RB 39.

=== Platform usage ===
In general, rail services use the platforms as follows:

Platform	Line	Use
1	RE 8 RB 27	to Mönchengladbach
2	RB 39	to Düsseldorf, Bedburg (Horrem and Cologne until December 2017)
3	RB 39	to Düsseldorf, Bedburg (Horrem and Cologne until December 2017)
4	RE 8 RB 27	to Koblenz

=== Bus routes ===
The station is served by the following bus routes operated by Busverkehr Rheinland:

Line	Route	Frequency
869	Neuss Stadthalle – Holzheim – Grevenbroich Kapellen – Wevelinghoven – Grevenbroich Bf	Every 60 or 120 minutes
871	Grevenbroich Bf – Rommerskirchen Vanikum – Rom. Postamt/Bf – Dormagen Delhoven – Dormagen Bf – Marktplatz/Cologne	Every 60 or 120 minutes
877	Neuss Landestheater – NE-Süd Bf – Holzheim – Grevenbroich Kapellen – Wevelinghoven (– Grevenbroich Bf)	Every 60 or 120 minutes
879	Neuss Stüttgen – Elvekum – Norf – Hoisten – Grevenbroich Neukirchen – Wevelinghoven (– Grevenbroich Bf) (small bus)	
891	Rommerskirchen − Grevenbroich Bf − Kapellen-Wevelinghoven Bf	Every 30 or 60 minutes
892	Gindorf – Gustorf – Grevenbroich Bf – Allrath – Rommerskirchen Oekoven – Evinghoven	Every 30 or 60 minutes
893	Kapellen-Wevelinghoven Bf – Wevelinghoven – Grevenbroich Bf	Every 60 minutes
