= Koblenz-Ehrenbreitstein station =

Station on the right bank in Koblenz

Koblenz Ehrenbreitstein
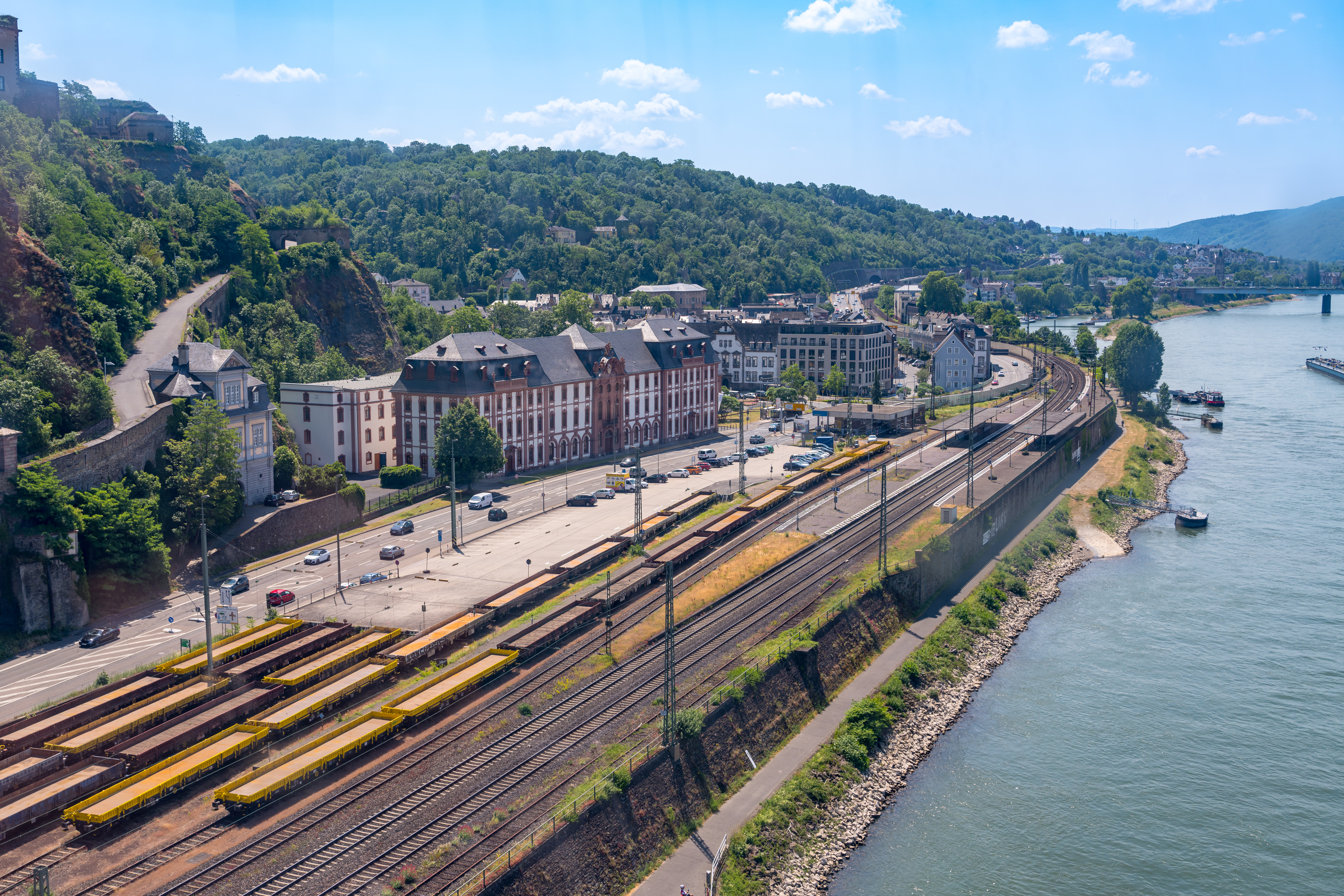
- Koblenz-Ehrenbreitstein station beside the Rhine

General information
- Location: Hofstr.257, Koblenz, Rhineland-Palatinate; Germany
- Coordinates: 50°21′43″N 7°36′37″E
- Lines: East Rhine Railway (KBS 465)
- Platforms: 3

Construction
- Accessible: No

Other information
- Station code: 3300
- DS100 code: KKOE
- IBNR: 8003351
- Category: 5
- Fare zone: VRM: 106
- Website: www.bahnhof.de

History
- Opened: 1869

Services
Preceding station	DB Regio NRW	Following station
Vallendar towards Mönchengladbach Hbf	RB 27	Koblenz Hbf Terminus
Location

Koblenz-Ehrenbreitstein station is the only station on the right (eastern) bank in the city of Koblenz in the German state of Rhineland-Palatinate. It is on the East Rhine railway (German: Rechte Rheinstrecke, Right Rhine line) at the foot of the Ehrenbreitstein hill in the Ehrenbreitstein district, next to the Rhine.

== History ==
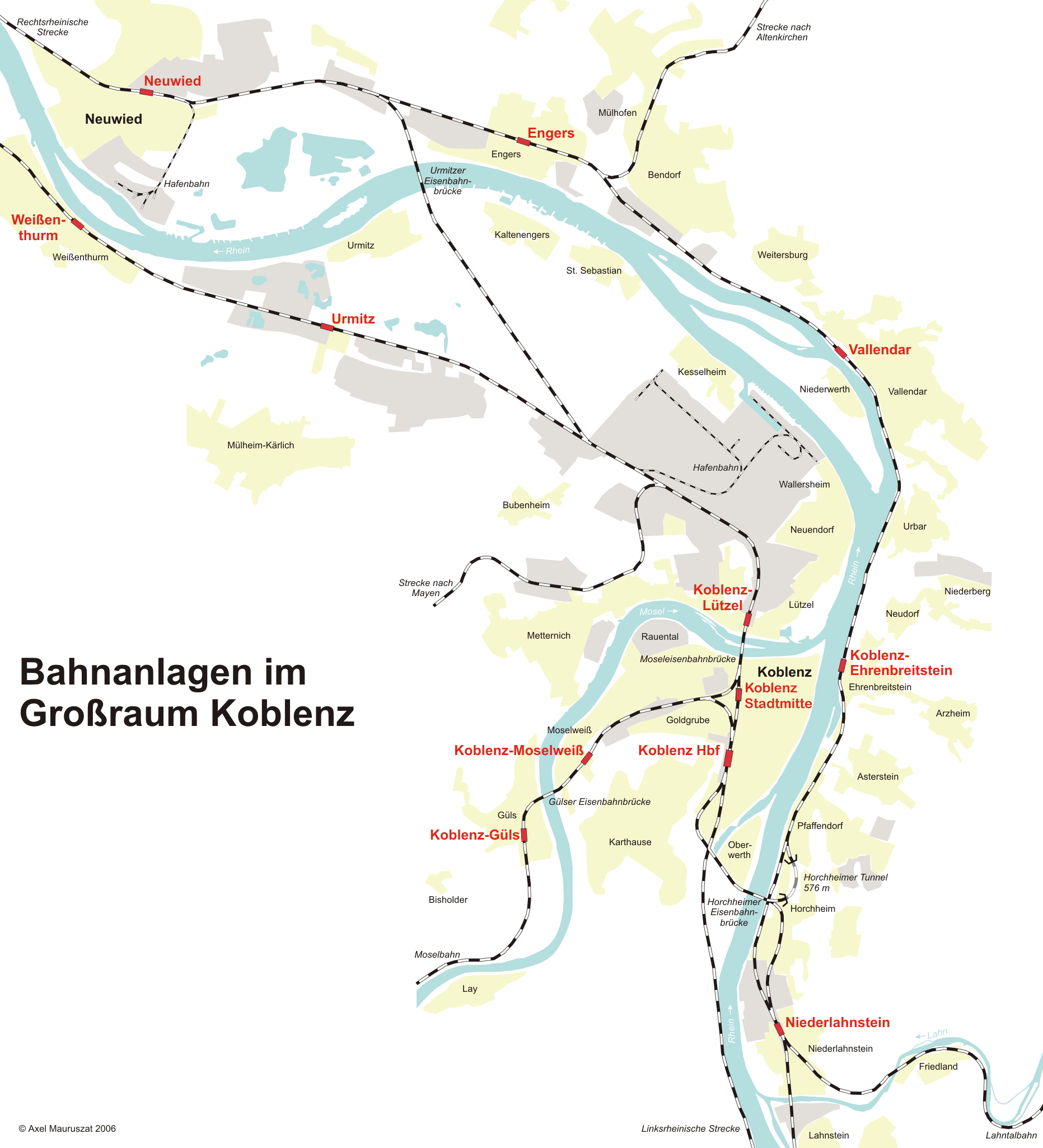
Map of the railway facilities in the Koblenz area

In 1859 and 1860 the governments of Prussia and Nassau negotiated over the construction of a railway between Ehrenbreitstein and Oberlahnstein. In Oberlahnstein the line would connect with the Nassau Rhine Railway (now part of the East Rhine line), then under construction, and the Lahntal railway. It was also stipulated in the contract that a railway bridge would be built between Koblenz and Ehrenbreitstein and the Duchy of Nassau committed itself to promote the construction of the Lahntal railway.

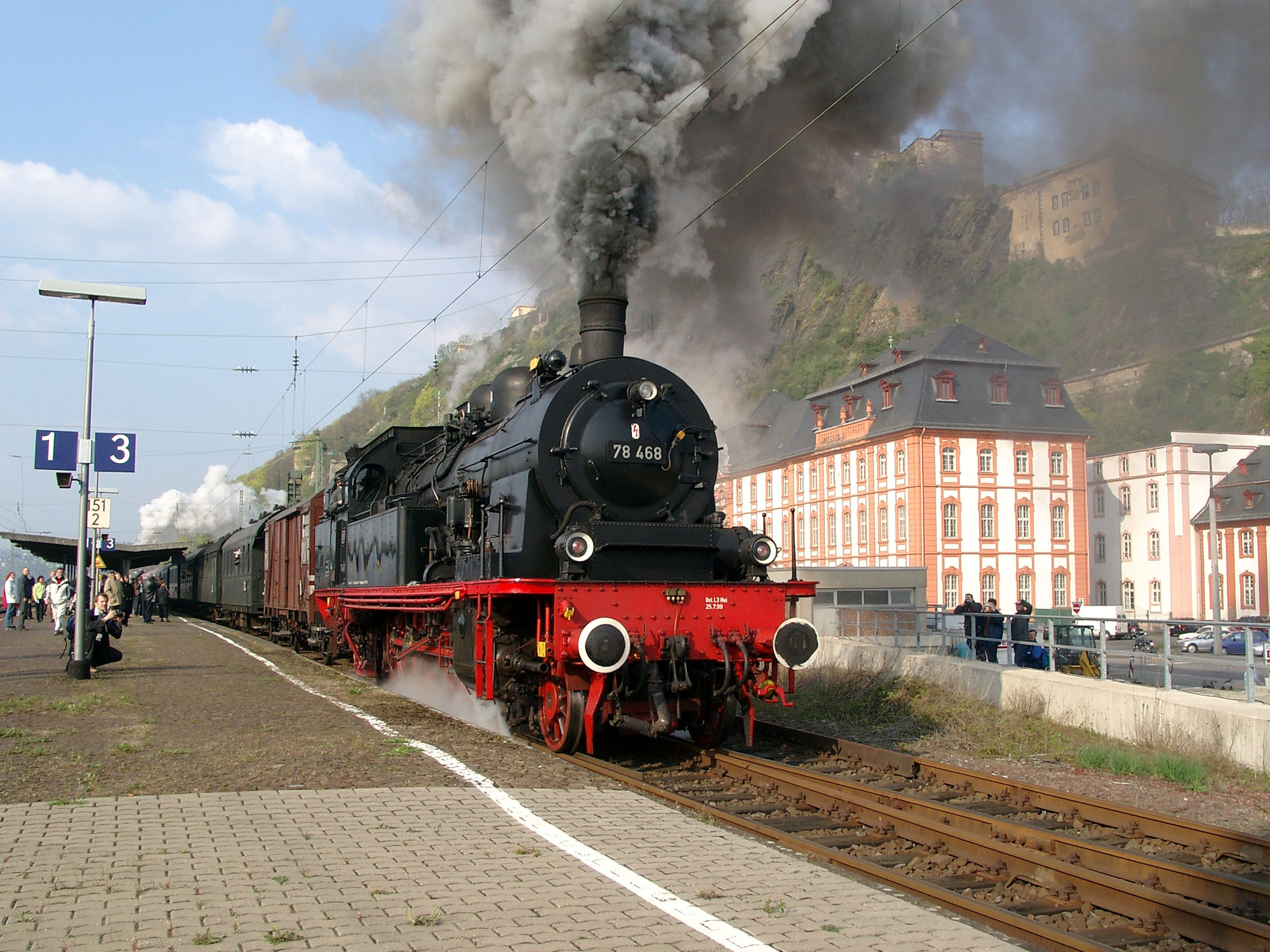
Steam locomotive 78 468 (Prussian T 18) in Koblenz-Ehrenbreitstein station

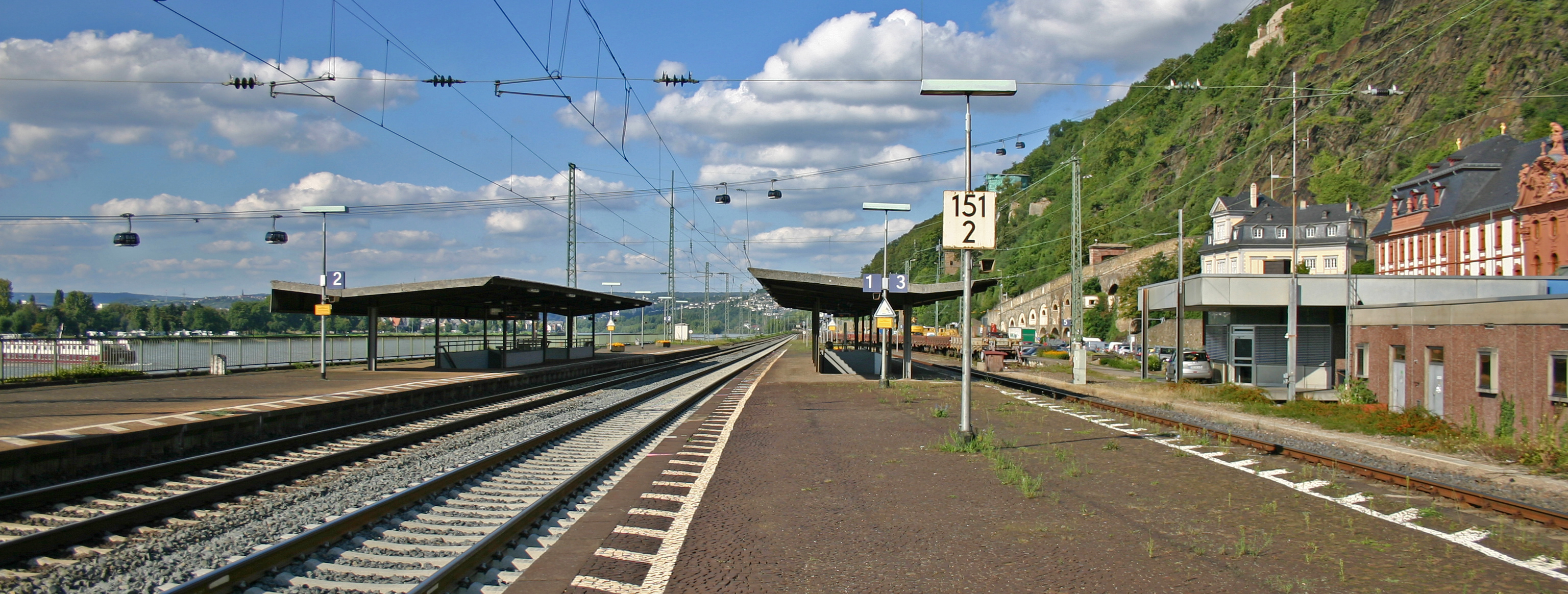
Koblenz-Ehrenbreitstein station

The Neuwied–Niederlahnstein section, including Ehrenbreitstein station, was put into operation on 27 October 1869. It had a railway post office and accommodation for the “track supervisor” (Bahnmeister). On the same day, the line was opened from Ehrenbreitstein station via Pfaffendorf Bridge to the former Rhenish railway station at Koblenz. The Rhenish station was northwest of today's Löhr-Center on Fischelstraße. The track remained under control of the railway company (which had become one of the Prussian state railways in 1880) only until 1899. The track over the bridge was then rebuilt for use by the Coblenz Tramway Company (Coblenzer Straßenbahn-Gesellschaft). In 1879, the Horchheim Railway Bridge was opened south of Pfaffendorf Bridge, connecting to the East Rhine railway and to Koblenz Hauptbahnhof (central station), when it opened in 1902.

== Services ==
The station is served by the Rhein-Erft-Bahn, running on the Koblenz–Cologne–Mönchengladbach route at hourly intervals; it was formerly also served by the Rhein-Erft-Express. Previously, the Rhein-Erft-Express had continued to Venlo after Mönchengladbach since its introduction in 1998.

Line	Service	Route	Frequency
RB 27	Rhein-Erft-Bahn	Mönchengladbach – Rheydt – Köln Hbf – Köln Messe/Deutz – Köln/Bonn Flughafen – Troisdorf – Bonn-Beuel – Linz (Rhein) – Neuwied – Koblenz-Ehrenbreitstein – Koblenz Hbf	Hourly

Until after the Second World War Ehrenbreitstein station also had significant long-distance traffic, since some of the trains on the right bank line did not serve Koblenz Hauptbahnhof. In the final timetable before the war all semi-fast trains and a D-train (D-Zug, express train with carriages with corridors) stopped at Ehrenbreitstein station.
