= Neuwied station =

Railway station in Neuwied, Germany

Neuwied
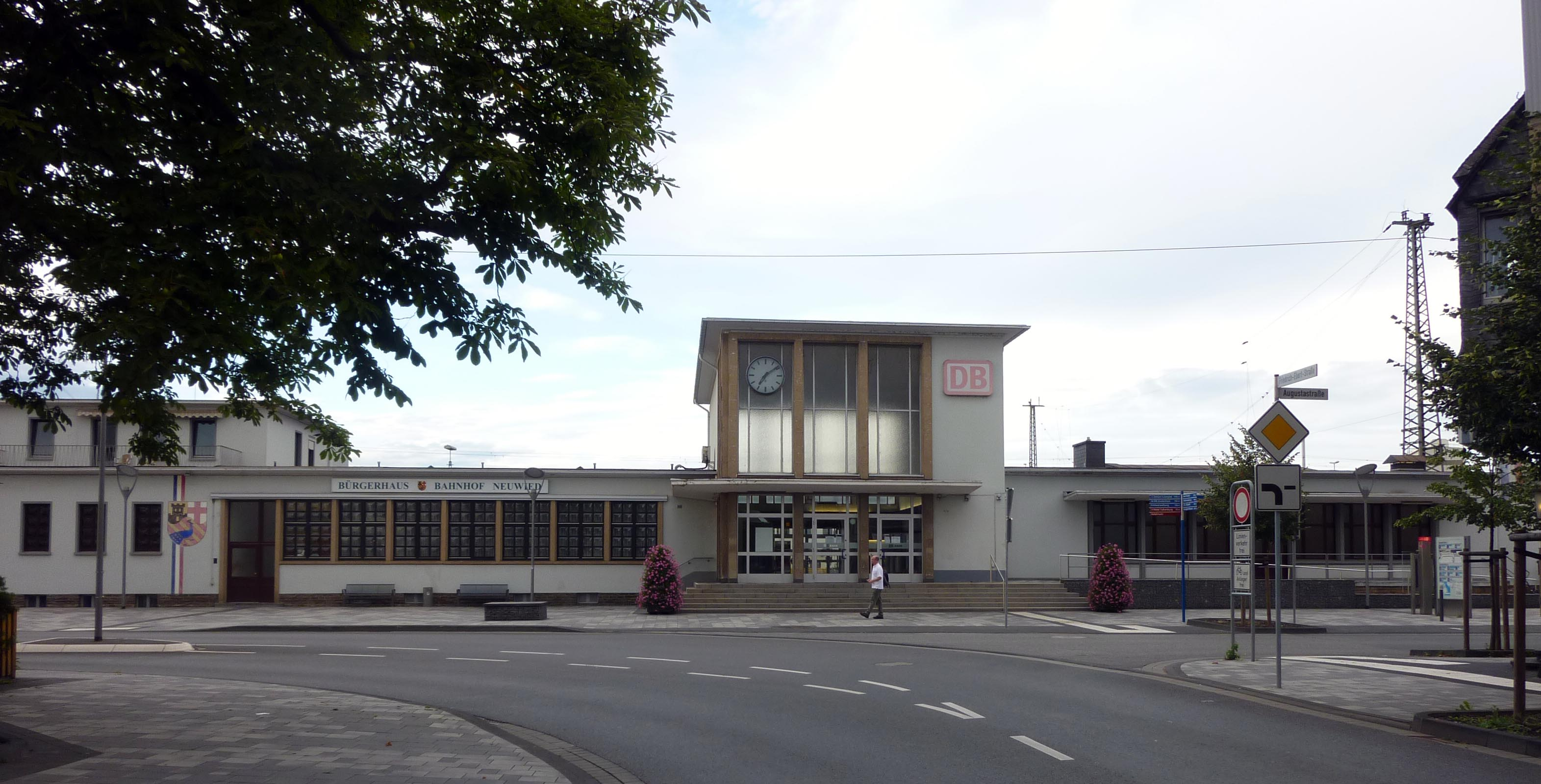

General information
- Location: Augustastr. 33, Neuwied, Rhineland-Palatinate; Germany
- Coordinates: 50°25′52″N 7°28′25″E
- Lines: East Rhine Railway (km 135.8); Neuwied–Koblenz railway (km 0.1)
- Platforms: 5

Construction
- Accessible: Yes

Other information
- Station code: 4464
- DS100 code: KNE
- IBNR: 8000276
- Category: 3
- Fare zone: VRM: 201; VRS: 2970 (VRM transitional tariff)
- Website: www.bahnhof.de

History
- Opened: 1869

Services
Preceding station	DB Regio NRW	Following station
Bad Hönningen towards Mönchengladbach Hbf	RE 8	Urmitz Rheinbrücke towards Koblenz Hbf
Leutesdorf (Rhein) towards Mönchengladbach Hbf	RB 27	Engers towards Koblenz Hbf
Preceding station	VIAS	Following station
Terminus	RB 10	Koblenz Stadtmitte towards Frankfurt (Main) Hbf
Location
- Location within Rhineland-Palatinate

Neuwied station is, along with Engers station, a hub of public transport in the town of Neuwied in the German state of Rhineland-Palatinate and it is located in its west. The station is located on the East Rhine Railway (German: Rechte Rheinstrecke) and is the starting point of the Neuwied–Koblenz railway. In the station forecourt there is a bus station. The station is classified by Deutsche Bahn as a category 3 station.

== History ==
The station was opened in 1869, along with the East Rhine Railway. In the early years, especially after the opening of the Westerwald Railway in 1884, Engers station was more important than Neuwied station. It was only after the construction of the Crown Prince Wilhelm bridge (the predecessor of today's Urmitz railway bridge) between Engers and Urmitz and the opening of the Neuwied–Koblenz railway in 1918 that the station became increasingly important, especially after the cessation of operations on the Westerwald Railway in the early 1990s.

When the West Rhine Railway was opened by the Rhenish Railway Company in 1857, there was a station called Neuwied in Weißenthurm. The company operated a ferry between Neuwied and Weißenthurm from 1860.

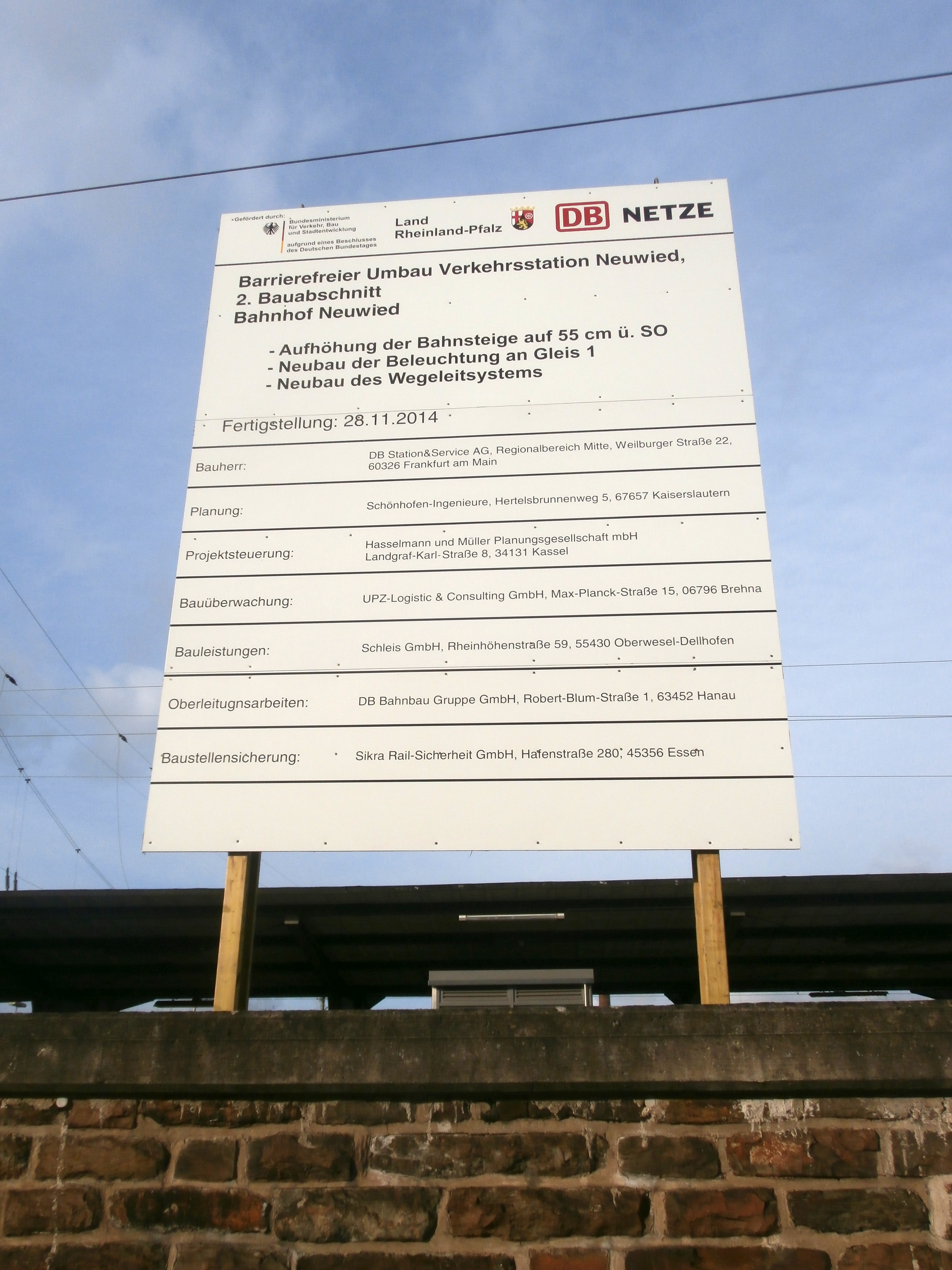
Notice of Modernisation

The first construction phase for the modernisation of Neuwied station was completed at the beginning of October 2011. This involved making the platform accessible with two lifts. In addition, the stairs were renewed and new wall and floor coverings with an integrated blind guidance system were installed in the passenger subway. In preparation for the second construction phase, the platform edge was raised to 55 cm in the area of the lift on the middle platform, which is faced by tracks 2 and 3, and the roof, which was in need of renovation, was replaced with modern roofing. Dynamic passenger information systems were also installed. This conversion cost €1.7 million, which was paid for out of the economic stimulus package. The second construction phase involved the renewal and raising of the platform next to the station building and the island platform. The modernisation of the station's ticket office was completed in December 2012. This measure cost €60,000. The second stage was started in the summer of 2014 and it was officially completed on 28 November 2014.

== Infrastructure ==
Neuwied station has a freight and a passenger area.

=== Freight yard ===
The Neuwied freight yard, which is operationally integrated into Neuwied station, has two loading tracks with a total of 1,827 square metres of roadway for loading. The loading of freight wagons can only be carried out on the loading road, using only one of the two electrified loading tracks.

=== Passenger station ===
Passenger traffic is handled at Neuwied station on two platforms with four platform edges (three through tracks and a terminating track).

Neuwied is not currently served by long-distance services.

In regional passenger transport, Neuwied station is served in the 2017 timetable by the following lines:

Line	Line name	Route	Frequency
RE 8	Rhein-Erft-Express	Mönchengladbach – Rheydt – Grevenbroich – Rommerskirchen – Cologne – Porz (Rhein) – Bonn-Beuel – Linz (Rhein) – Neuwied – Koblenz-Lützel – Koblenz Stadtmitte – Koblenz Hbf	Hourly
RB 10	RheingauLinie	Neuwied – Koblenz Stadtmitte – Koblenz Hbf – Rüdesheim (Rhein) – Wiesbaden – Frankfurt (Main)	Hourly
RB 27	Rhein-Erft-Bahn	Mönchengladbach – Rheydt – Grevenbroich – Rommerskirchen – Cologne – Cologne/Bonn Airport – Bonn-Beuel – Linz (Rhein) – Neuwied – Engers – Koblenz-Ehrenbreitstein – Koblenz Hbf	Hourly

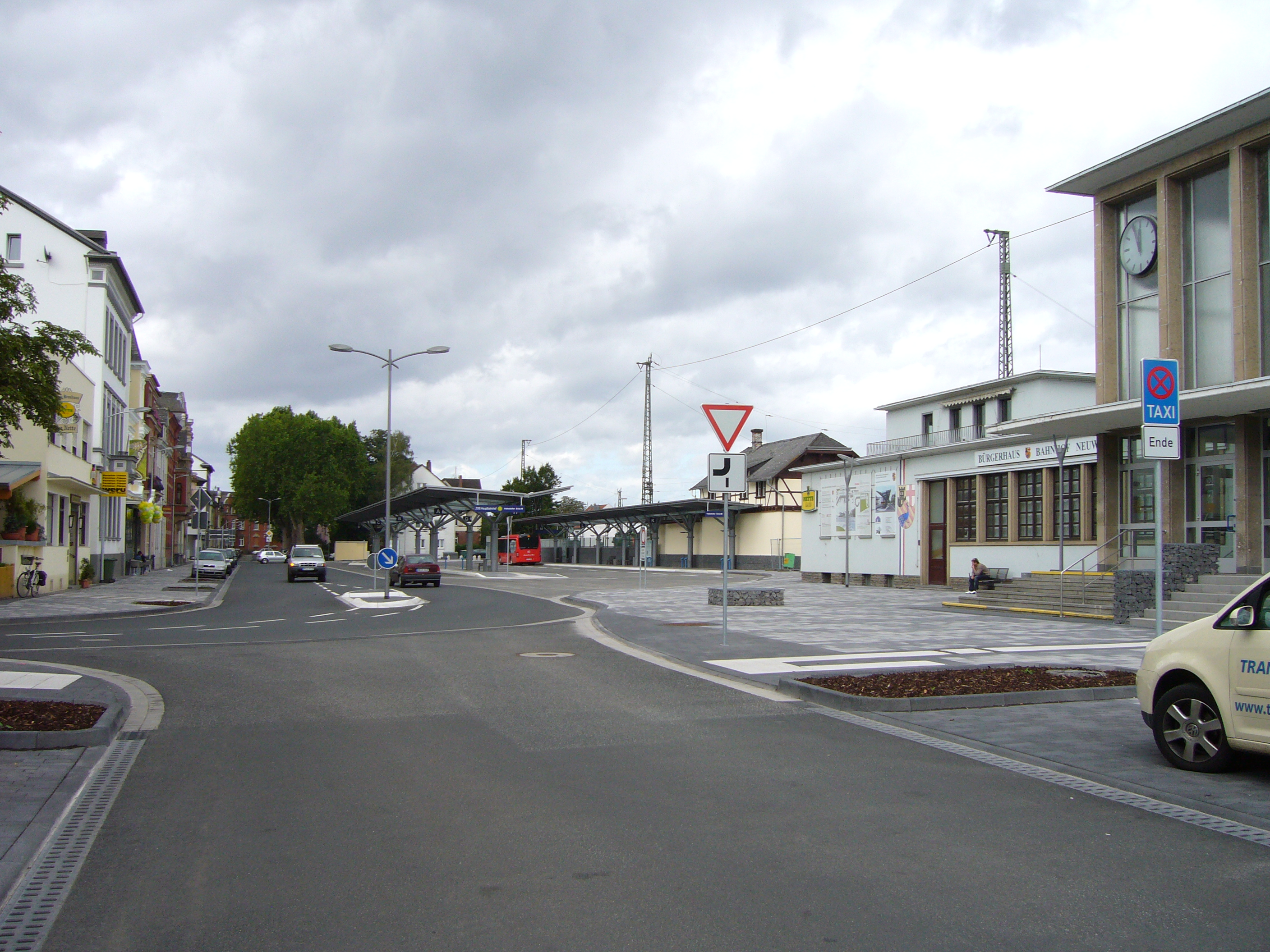
The station forecourt, in the centre is the bus station, to the right is the community centre in the entrance building

== Outside the station ==
The complete redesign of the station forecourt was carried out with a good appreciation of the station and its surroundings. This redesign included:

- the renewal and rebuilding of eleven bus bays (in addition, twelve bus parking spaces were provided)
- the building of a parking area for bicycles
- the creation of 100 park and ride spaces.

In addition, a community centre now occupies part of the station building.
