= Porz (Rhein) station =

Railway station in Cologne, Germany

Porz (Rhein)
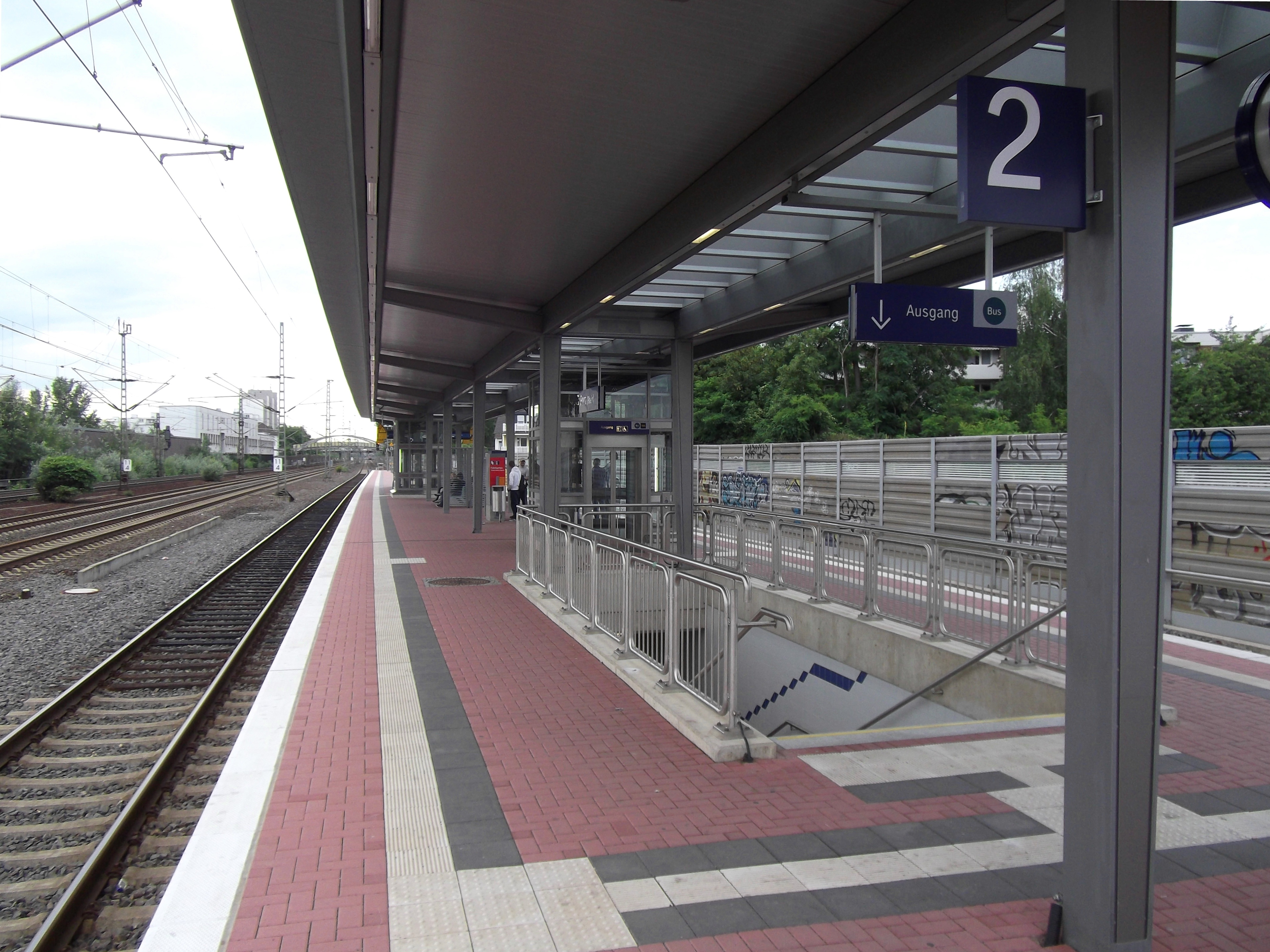
- Porz (Rhein) station

General information
- Location: Bahnhofstr. 148, Porz (Rhein), Cologne, NRW; Germany
- Coordinates: 50°52′59″N 7°03′53″E
- Owner: Deutsche Bahn
- Operator: DB Netz; DB Station&Service
- Lines: Sieg Railway; East Rhine Railway
- Platforms: 2

Construction
- Accessible: Yes

Other information
- Station code: 4999
- DS100 code: KPRH
- IBNR: 8004869
- Category: 4
- Fare zone: VRS: 2100
- Website: www.bahnhof.de

Services
Preceding station	DB Regio NRW	Following station
Köln Messe/Deutz towards Mönchengladbach Hbf	RE 8	Troisdorf towards Koblenz Hbf
Köln Messe/Deutz towards Aachen Hbf	RE 9	Troisdorf towards Siegen Hbf
Preceding station	Cologne S-Bahn	Following station
Köln-Steinstraße towards Horrem	S12	Porz-Wahn towards Au (Sieg)
Location

Porz (Rhein) is a railway station situated at Porz, Cologne in the German state of North Rhine-Westphalia on the Sieg and East Rhine Railways. It is served by Cologne S-Bahn S12 line between Düren or Köln-Ehrenfeld and Troisdorf every 20 minutes Monday–Saturday and every 30 minutes on Sunday. It is classified by Deutsche Bahn as a category 4 station.
