= Rommerskirchen =

- Municipality
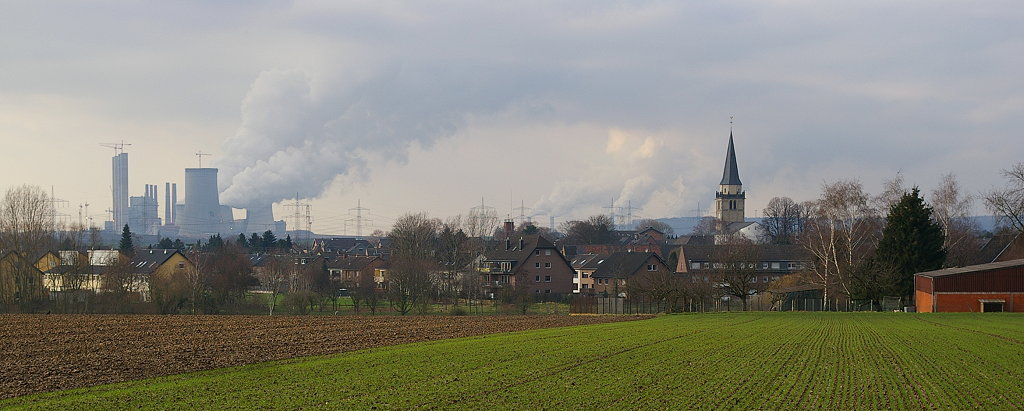
- Rommerskirchen

- Flag Coat of arms

- Location of Rommerskirchen within Rhein-Kreis Neuss district
- Interactive map of Rommerskirchen
- Location within Germany Location within North Rhine-Westphalia
- Coordinates: 51°2′5″N 6°41′29″E
- Country: Germany
- State: North Rhine-Westphalia
- Admin. region: Düsseldorf
- District: Rhein-Kreis Neuss

Government
  - Mayor (2020–25): Dr. Martin Mertens (SPD)

Area
  - Total: 60.08 km^{2} (23.20 sq mi)
- Elevation: 70 m (230 ft)

Population (2025-12-31)
  - Total: 13,982
  - Density: 232.7/km^{2} (602.7/sq mi)
- Time zone: UTC+01:00 (CET)
  - Summer (DST): UTC+02:00 (CEST)
- Postal codes: 41569
- Dialling codes: 02183, 02182, 02181
- Vehicle registration: NE
- Website: www.rommerskirchen.de

Rommerskirchen (German pronunciation: [ʁɔmɐsˈkɪʁçn̩]) is the southernmost municipality in the Rhein-Kreis Neuss, in North Rhine-Westphalia, Germany.

== Notable places ==
Rommerskirchen possesses rich historical inheritances, including numerous remains of the Roman Villae Rusticae, and those from several Frankish settlements. The town centre still contains several medieval Roman and Gothic churches and a castle. There are many buildings from even earlier modern times, as well as those from the time of the Napoleonic occupation. Many of these sites are currently closed while undergoing restoration.

== Population ==
Historical population

Year	Pop.	±% p.a.
1965	9,984	—
1970	10,616	+1.24%
1975	11,095	+0.89%
1980	11,170	+0.13%
1985	11,069	−0.18%
1990	11,414	+0.62%
1995	12,151	+1.26%

Year	Pop.	±% p.a.
2000	12,382	+0.38%
2005	12,611	+0.37%
2010	13,001	+0.61%
2015	13,137	+0.21%
2020	13,357	+0.33%
2025	13,982	+0.92%

Source: Landesdatabank Nordrhein-Westfalen

== Infrastructure ==
Rommerskirchen is the location of a large 380kV-substation of the RWE. The first 380kV-line in Germany went into service on October 5, 1957. It began between the transformer stations of Rommerskirchen and Ludwigsburg-Hoheneck. The strategic railway embankment begins at Rommerskirchen station, and Oekoven maintains a public railway facility. Rommerskirchen generally mean Roman Catholic Church.

== Famous people ==
- Horst Lichter (born 1962), German chef and television presenter
