= Troisdorf station =

Railway station in Germany

Troisdorf
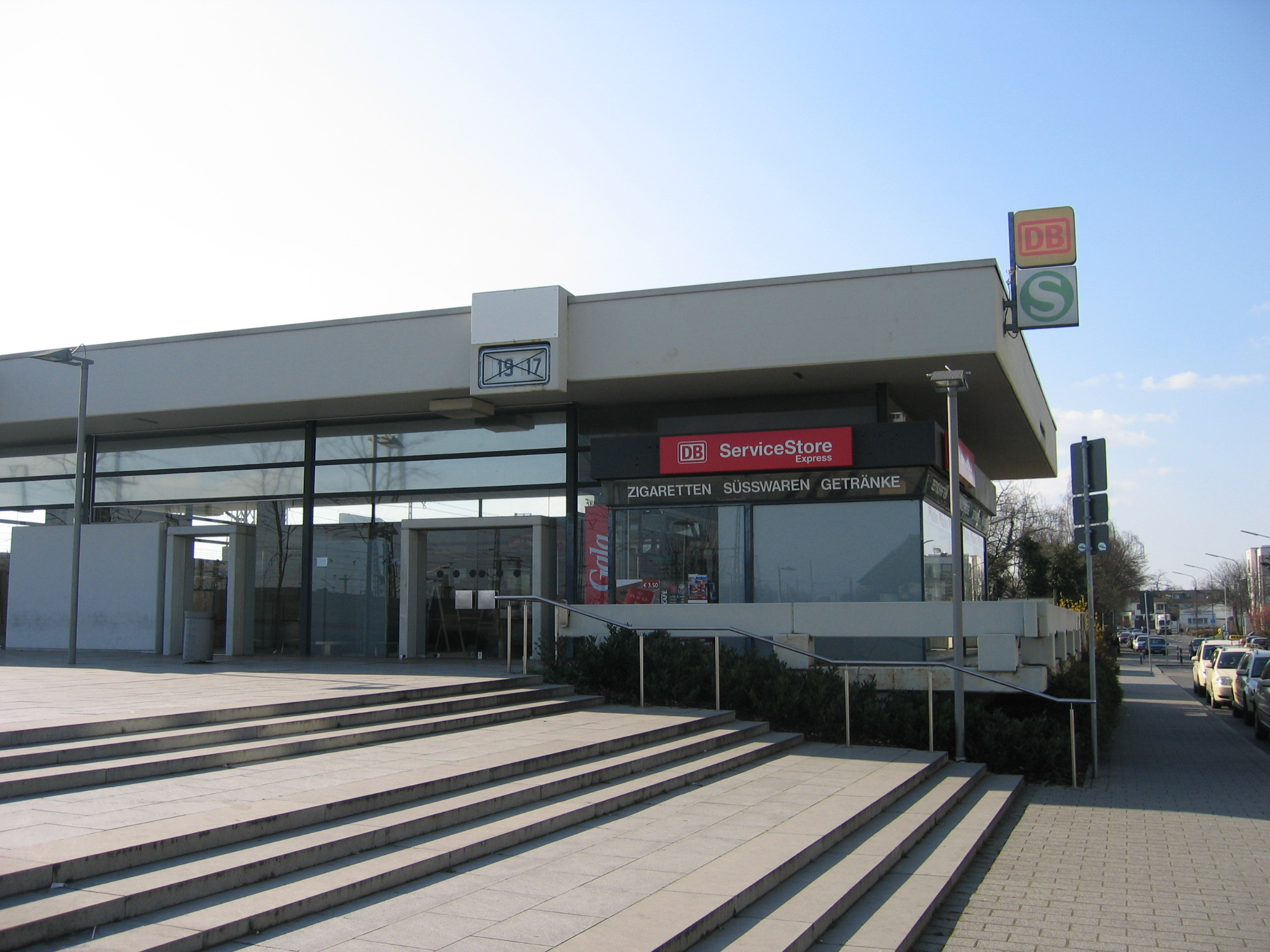

General information
- Location: Poststr. 64, Troisdorf, NRW; Germany
- Coordinates: 50°48′48″N 7°09′04″E
- Owner: Deutsche Bahn
- Operator: DB Netz; DB Station&Service
- Lines: East Rhine Railway (KBS 465); Sieg Railway (KBS 460); (KBS 450.12); (KBS 450.13)
- Platforms: 2

Construction
- Accessible: Yes

Other information
- Station code: 6273
- DS100 code: KT
- IBNR: 8000135
- Category: 3
- Fare zone: VRS: 2545
- Website: www.bahnhof.de

History
- Opened: 25 August 1861

Services
Preceding station	DB Regio NRW	Following station
Porz (Rhein) towards Mönchengladbach Hbf	RE 8	Menden (Rheinl) towards Koblenz Hbf
Porz (Rhein) towards Aachen Hbf	RE 9	Siegburg/Bonn towards Siegen Hbf
Cologne/Bonn Airport towards Mönchengladbach Hbf	RB 27	Friedrich Wilhelmshütte towards Koblenz Hbf
Preceding station	Cologne S-Bahn	Following station
Spich towards Horrem	S12	Siegburg/Bonn towards Hennef (Sieg) or Au (Sieg)
Spich towards Düren	S19	Siegburg/Bonn towards Au (Sieg)
Location
- Location within North Rhine-Westphalia

Troisdorf station is a railway junction in the town of Troisdorf in the German state of North Rhine-Westphalia, where the line from Cologne separates into the East Rhine Railway to Neuwied and the Sieg Railway to Siegen. In addition to various regional rail services Troisdorf is served by line S12 of the Cologne S-Bahn. This operates between Troisdorf, Hennef (Sieg) or Au (Sieg) and Köln-Ehrenfeld or Horrem at 20-minute intervals. It is also served by the S19 service between Hennef or Au and Düren, at 20-minute intervals. These two services provide a service every 10 minutes between Troisdorf and Cologne. It is classified by Deutsche Bahn as a category 3 station.

The Cologne–Frankfurt high-speed line also passes through Troisdorf, but without stopping. In the course of the construction of high-speed line, the three platforms were rebuilt and raised. Renovation or replacement of the station building is being planned.
