= Rhein-Erft-Express =

RE 8 Rhein-Erft-Express
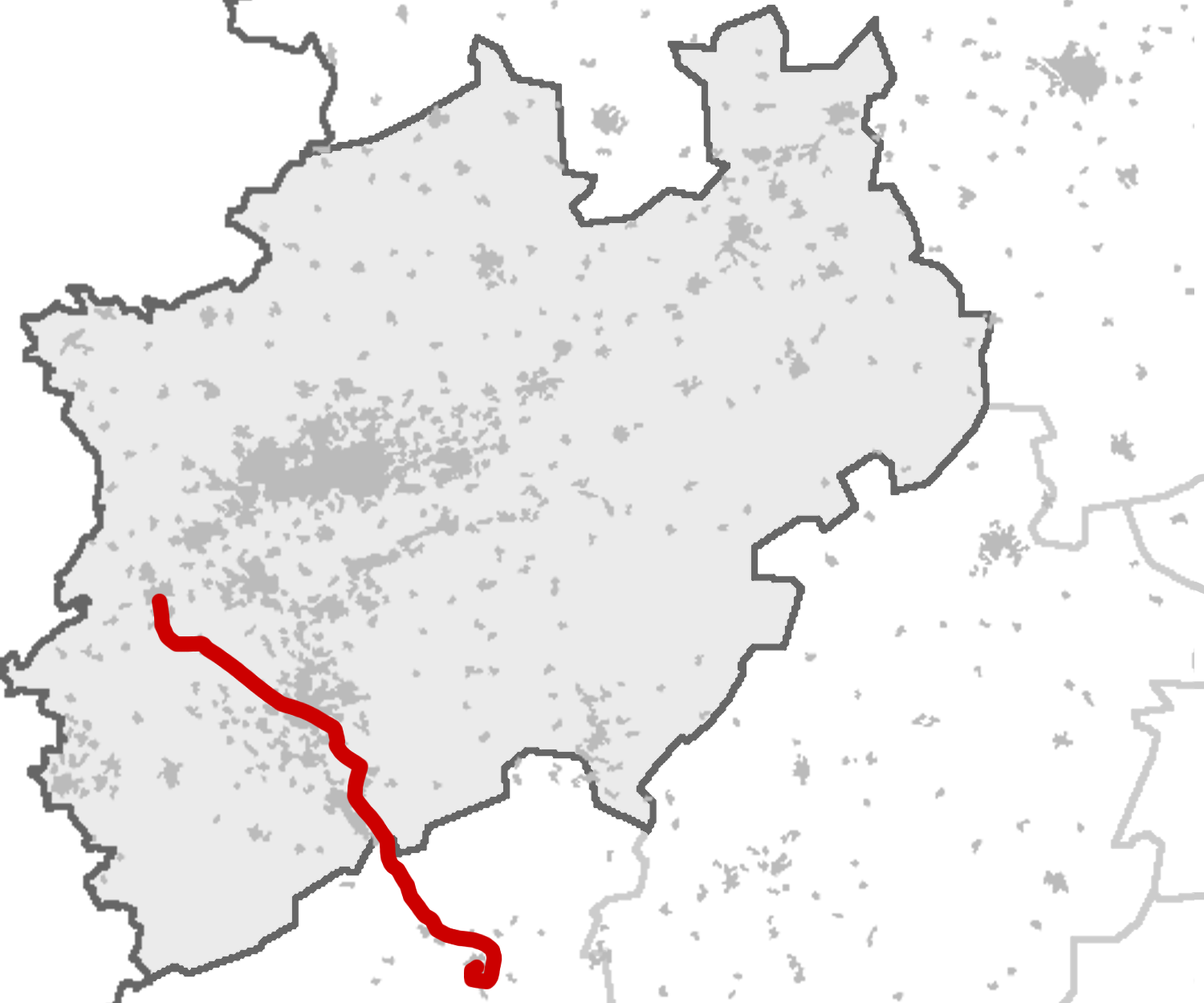

Overview
- Locale: North Rhine-Westphalia, Germany

Service
- Route number: 465

Technical
- Line length: 156 km (97 mi)

The Rhein-Erft-Express is a Regional-Express service in the German states of North Rhine-Westphalia and Rhineland-Palatinate. It is numbered as line RE 8 and connects the cities of Mönchengladbach, Cologne, Bonn and Koblenz with each other and their surroundings, running hourly. It is complemented by a Regionalbahn stopping service, the Rhein-Erft-Bahn (RB 27), running also between Mönchengladbach Hauptbahnhof and Koblenz Hauptbahnhof. On weekends it stops at some additional stations between Cologne Hbf and Koblenz Hbf. It is operated by DB Regio with Alstom Coradia Continental EMUs.

== Route ==
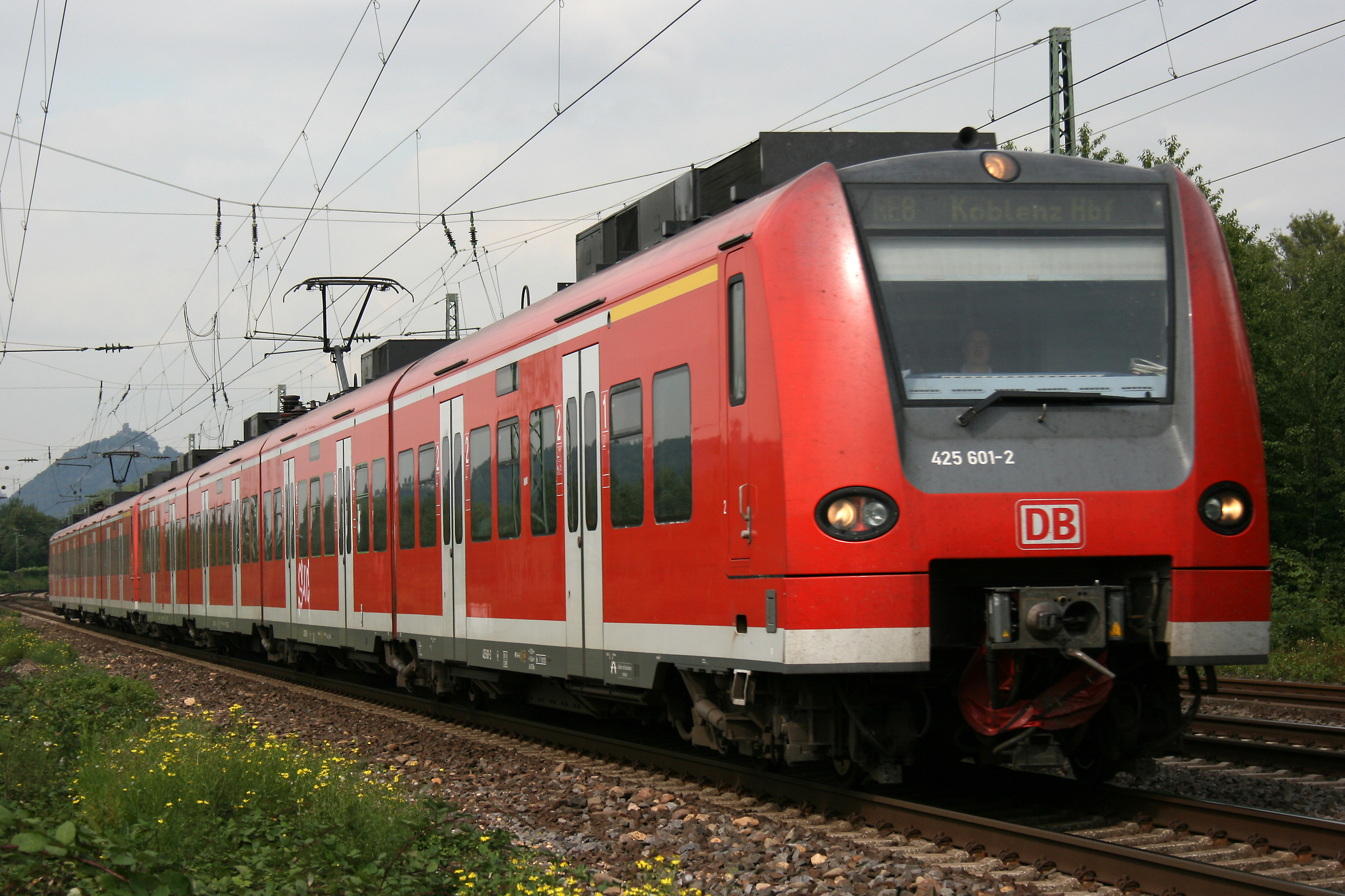
RE 8 near Unkel

The Rhine-Erft-Express runs from Mönchengladbach via the Cologne–Mönchengladbach line to Cologne, where it stops, despite its classification as a Regional-Express, at all stations. Near Grevenbroich it crosses the Erft river. In Cologne, it crosses the Rhine on the Hohenzollern Bridge and runs on the eastern bank via Porz (Rhein) to Troisdorf, where it runs on to the Right Rhine line. Between Menden (Rheinl) and Unkel it stops at all stations. Trains cross the Urmitz Railway Bridge over the Rhine via Koblenz Stadtmitte to Koblenz Hauptbahnhof.

In contrast, the RB 27 Rhein-Erft-Bahn takes another route via the airport loop with stop at Cologne/Bonn Airport to Troisdorf, also on to the Right Rhine line. From Neuwied, the line RB 27 runs via Koblenz-Ehrenbreitstein and cross the Horchheim Railway Bridge over the Rhine to Koblenz Hauptbahnhof.

== Syndicates and fares ==
The Rhine-Erft Express is funded jointly by three transport associations: the Verkehrsverbund Rhein-Ruhr (Rhine-Ruhr transport association, VRR), which includes the Mönchengladbach–Rommerskirchen section, the Verkehrsverbund Rhein-Sieg (Rhine-Sieg transport association, VRS), which includes the Stommeln–Bad Honnef section and the Rhineland-Palatinate Zweckverband SPNV-Nord (regional rail transport “purpose association” North).

VRR fares apply between Mönchengladbach and Rommerskirchen. Between Unkel and Koblenz the fares of the Verkehrsverbund Rhein-Mosel (Rhine-Moselle transport association, VRM) apply. Due to extensive overlap of rules VRS fares apply between Grevenbroich and Engers.

== History ==
From 1998 to 2002 there was a Rhein-Erft-Express service numbered RE 18. Line number RE 8 applied to the Rhein-Holland-Express, which operated over the Venlo–Mönchengladbach–Cologne–Koblenz route. With the introduction of the second stage of the North Rhine-Westphalia integrated timetable in 2002, the VRR sought a transfer-free connection from Düsseldorf to Venlo, which meant that the Rhein-Erft-Express was cut back to Mönchengladbach and renumbered as RE 8. The section of the route from Moenchengladbach to Venlo became part of the new Maas-Wupper-Express, RE 13.

From December 2002, RE 8 ran largely to today's route with push–pull trains consisting of class 143 locomotives and five Silberling carriages. A change of the service to double-deck coaches was planned and vehicles had already been ordered. After the opening of the Cologne/Bonn Airport station on 13 June 2004, the Rhine-Erft Express was diverted to run through it. As travel through the airport tunnel required vehicles with the modern German emergency brake system (German: Notbremsüberbrückung), the line was operated with new class 425 electric multiple units in double sets.

== See also ==
- List of regional rail lines in North Rhine-Westphalia
- List of scheduled railway routes in Germany
