= Krefeld I – Neuss II =

Federal electoral district of Germany

109 Krefeld I – Neuss II
- Electoral district for the Bundestag
- Krefeld I – Neuss II in 2025
- State: North Rhine-Westphalia
- Population: 271,500 (2019)
- Electorate: 200,048 (2021)
- Major settlements: Krefeld (partial); Meerbusch; Kaarst
- Area: 301.5 km^{2}

Current electoral district
- Created: 2002
- Party: CDU
- Member: Ansgar Heveling
- Elected: 2009, 2013, 2017, 2021, 2025

Krefeld I – Neuss II is an electoral constituency (German: Wahlkreis) represented in the Bundestag. It elects one member via first-past-the-post voting. Under the current constituency numbering system, it is designated as constituency 109. It is located in western North Rhine-Westphalia, comprising the southern part of the city of Krefeld and the northern part of the Rhein-Kreis Neuss district.

Krefeld I – Neuss II was created for the 2002 federal election. Since 2009, it has been represented by Ansgar Heveling of the Christian Democratic Union (CDU).

== Geography ==
Krefeld I – Neuss II is located in western North Rhine-Westphalia. As of the 2021 federal election, it comprises the Stadtbezirke of West, Süd, Fischeln, Oppum-Linn, and Uerdingen from the independent city of Krefeld and the municipalities of Jüchen, Kaarst, Korschenbroich, and Meerbusch from the district of Rhein-Kreis Neuss.

== History ==
Krefeld I – Neuss II was created in 2002 and contained parts of the abolished constituencies of Krefeld and Neuss II. In the 2002 through 2009 elections, it was constituency 111 in the numbering system. In the 2013 through 2021 elections, it was number 110. From the 2025 election, it has been number 109.

== Members ==
The constituency was first represented by Willy Wimmer of the Christian Democratic Union (CDU) from 2002 to 2009. Ansgar Heveling was elected in 2009, and re-elected in 2013, 2017, 2021, and 2025.

| Election | Member | Party | % |
|---|---|---|---|
| 2002 | Willy Wimmer | CDU | 43.5 |
| 2005 | Willy Wimmer | CDU | 47.4 |
| 2009 | Ansgar Heveling | CDU | 42.3 |
| 2013 | Ansgar Heveling | CDU | 49.1 |
| 2017 | Ansgar Heveling | CDU | 42.4 |
| 2021 | Ansgar Heveling | CDU | 33.4 |
| 2025 | Ansgar Heveling | CDU | 37.8 |

== Election results ==
=== 2025 election ===
Federal election (2025): Krefeld I – Neuss II
| Notes: | Blue background denotes the winner of the electorate vote. Pink background denotes a candidate elected from their party list. Yellow background denotes an electorate win by a list member, or other incumbent. A ✓ or ✗ denotes status of any incumbent, win or lose respectively. | | | | | | |
| Party | Candidate | Votes | % | ±% | Party votes | % | ±% |
|---|---|---|---|---|---|---|---|
| CDU | ✓ Ansgar Heveling | 61,543 | 37.8 | ▲4.4 | 55,630 | 34.1 | ▲4.6 |
| SPD | Ina Spainer-Oppermann | 36,512 | 22.4 | ▼3.0 | 29,572 | 18.1 | ▼7.4 |
| AfD | Frank Wübbeling | 23,769 | 14.6 | ▲8.7 | 23,886 | 14.6 | ▲8.6 |
| Greens | Vincent Lohmann | 17,840 | 11.0 | ▼4.8 | 20,007 | 12.3 | ▼3.3 |
| Left | Stephan Hagemes | 10,838 | 6.7 | ▲3.9 | 11,477 | 7.0 | ▲4.0 |
| FDP | Otto Fricke | 8,910 | 5.5 | ▼6.7 | 10,107 | 6.2 | ▼8.1 |
| BSW | | | | | 6,285 | 3.9 | |
| FW | Olaf Paas | 3,268 | 2.0 | ▲0.7 | 1,033 | 0.6 | 0.0 |
| Tierschutzpartei | | | | | 2,103 | 1.3 | ▼0.1 |
| Volt | | | | | 913 | 0.6 | ▲0.3 |
| PARTEI | Konstantin Florenz | | | ▼1.9 | 827 | 0.5 | ▼0.5 |
| dieBasis | | | | ▼1.1 | 372 | 0.2 | ▼0.8 |
| Team Todenhöfer | | | | | 330 | 0.2 | ▼0.4 |
| PdF | | | | | 301 | 0.2 | ▲0.2 |
| BD | | | | | 190 | 0.1 | |
| Values | | | | | 97 | 0.1 | |
| MERA25 | | | | | 66 | 0.0 | |
| MLPD | | | | ▼0.1 | 48 | 0.0 | 0.0 |
| Pirates | | | | | | | ▼0.4 |
| Gesundheitsforschung | | | | | | | ▼0.1 |
| ÖDP | | | | | | | ▼0.1 |
| Humanists | | | | | | | ▼0.1 |
| Bündnis C | | | | | | | ▼0.1 |
| SGP | | | | | | 0.0 | 0.0 |
| Informal votes | | 1,470 | | | 906 | | |
| Total valid votes | | 162,680 | | | 163,244 | | |
| Turnout | | 164,150 | 83.5 | ▲5.7 | | | |
| CDU hold | Majority | 25,031 | 15.4 | | | | |

=== 2021 election ===
Federal election (2021): Krefeld I – Neuss II
| Notes: | Blue background denotes the winner of the electorate vote. Pink background denotes a candidate elected from their party list. Yellow background denotes an electorate win by a list member, or other incumbent. A ✓ or ✗ denotes status of any incumbent, win or lose respectively. | | | | | | |
| Party | Candidate | Votes | % | ±% | Party votes | % | ±% |
|---|---|---|---|---|---|---|---|
| CDU | ✓ Ansgar Heveling | 51,500 | 33.4 | ▼9.0 | 45,635 | 29.5 | ▼6.1 |
| SPD | Philipp Einfalt | 39,253 | 25.5 | 0.0 | 39,407 | 25.5 | ▲3.4 |
| Greens | Katharina Voller | 24,383 | 15.8 | ▲9.2 | 24,014 | 15.5 | ▲8.5 |
| FDP | Otto Fricke | 18,781 | 12.2 | ▲0.7 | 22,069 | 14.3 | ▼3.1 |
| AfD | Christof Rausch | 9,150 | 5.9 | ▼1.4 | 9,342 | 6.0 | ▼1.8 |
| Left | Julia Suermondt | 4,319 | 2.8 | ▼2.3 | 4,680 | 3.0 | ▼3.3 |
| Tierschutzpartei | | | | | 2,111 | 1.4 | ▲0.7 |
| PARTEI | Konstantin Florenz | 2,918 | 1.9 | ▲0.4 | 1,610 | 1.0 | ▲0.2 |
| FW | Ralf Krings | 1,980 | 1.3 | | 981 | 0.6 | ▲0.4 |
| dieBasis | Stefan Marzinowski | 1,759 | 1.1 | | 1,528 | 1.0 | |
| Team Todenhöfer | | | | | 975 | 0.6 | |
| Pirates | | | | | 580 | 0.4 | 0.0 |
| Volt | | | | | 379 | 0.2 | |
| LIEBE | | | | | 201 | 0.1 | |
| Gesundheitsforschung | | | | | 155 | 0.1 | 0.0 |
| LfK | | | | | 147 | 0.1 | |
| V-Partei3 | | | | | 119 | 0.1 | 0.0 |
| ÖDP | | | | | 117 | 0.1 | 0.0 |
| NPD | | | | | 108 | 0.1 | ▼0.1 |
| Humanists | | | | | 103 | 0.1 | 0.0 |
| Bündnis C | | | | | 94 | 0.1 | |
| du. | | | | | 65 | 0.0 | |
| DKP | | | | | 45 | 0.0 | 0.0 |
| MLPD | Heiko Grupp | 163 | 0.1 | 0.0 | 44 | 0.0 | 0.0 |
| PdF | | | | | 36 | 0.0 | |
| LKR | | | | | 33 | 0.0 | |
| SGP | | | | | 16 | 0.0 | 0.0 |
| Informal votes | | 1,520 | | | 1,132 | | |
| Total valid votes | | 154,206 | | | 154,594 | | |
| Turnout | | 155,726 | 77.8 | ▲0.7 | | | |
| CDU hold | Majority | 12,247 | 7.9 | ▼9.0 | | | |

=== 2017 election ===
Federal election (2017): Krefeld I – Neuss II
| Notes: | Blue background denotes the winner of the electorate vote. Pink background denotes a candidate elected from their party list. Yellow background denotes an electorate win by a list member, or other incumbent. A ✓ or ✗ denotes status of any incumbent, win or lose respectively. | | | | | | |
| Party | Candidate | Votes | % | ±% | Party votes | % | ±% |
|---|---|---|---|---|---|---|---|
| CDU | ✓ Ansgar Heveling | 65,228 | 42.4 | ▼6.6 | 54,907 | 35.6 | ▼9.1 |
| SPD | Nicole Specker | 39,142 | 25.5 | ▼5.5 | 34,051 | 22.1 | ▼5.3 |
| FDP | Otto Fricke | 17,673 | 11.5 | ▲7.8 | 26,859 | 17.4 | ▲10.1 |
| AfD | Christof Rausch | 11,196 | 7.3 | ▲4.8 | 12,104 | 7.9 | ▲4.0 |
| Greens | Susanne Mervat Badra | 10,140 | 6.6 | ▼0.8 | 10,871 | 7.1 | ▲0.2 |
| Left | Heiner Bäther | 7,815 | 5.1 | ▲1.0 | 9,805 | 6.4 | ▲1.2 |
| PARTEI | Carsten Bullert | 2,308 | 1.5 | ▲1.1 | 1,318 | 0.9 | ▲0.5 |
| Tierschutzpartei | | | | | 1,041 | 0.7 | |
| AD-DEMOKRATEN | | | | | 764 | 0.5 | |
| Pirates | | | | | 634 | 0.4 | ▼1.7 |
| FW | | | | | 371 | 0.2 | ▼0.1 |
| NPD | | | | | 310 | 0.2 | ▼0.6 |
| V-Partei³ | | | | | 163 | 0.1 | |
| DiB | | | | | 161 | 0.1 | |
| ÖDP | | | | | 159 | 0.1 | 0.0 |
| BGE | | | | | 135 | 0.1 | |
| Volksabstimmung | | | | | 123 | 0.1 | ▼0.1 |
| Gesundheitsforschung | | | | | 117 | 0.1 | |
| DM | | | | | 127 | 0.1 | |
| MLPD | Heiko Grupp | 171 | 0.1 | | 82 | 0.1 | 0.0 |
| Die Humanisten | | | | | 62 | 0.0 | |
| DKP | | | | | 20 | 0.0 | |
| SGP | | | | | 6 | 0.0 | 0.0 |
| Informal votes | | 1,761 | | | 1,244 | | |
| Total valid votes | | 153,673 | | | 154,190 | | |
| Turnout | | 155,434 | 77.2 | ▲2.5 | | | |
| CDU hold | Majority | 26,086 | 16.9 | ▼1.3 | | | |

=== 2013 election ===
Federal election (2013): Krefeld I – Neuss II
| Notes: | Blue background denotes the winner of the electorate vote. Pink background denotes a candidate elected from their party list. Yellow background denotes an electorate win by a list member, or other incumbent. A ✓ or ✗ denotes status of any incumbent, win or lose respectively. | | | | | | |
| Party | Candidate | Votes | % | ±% | Party votes | % | ±% |
|---|---|---|---|---|---|---|---|
| CDU | ✓ Ansgar Heveling | 73,201 | 49.1 | ▲6.8 | 66,802 | 44.7 | ▲8.8 |
| SPD | Benedikt Winzen | 46,148 | 30.9 | ▲1.8 | 40,968 | 27.4 | ▲3.4 |
| Greens | Karl-Heinz Renner | 8,693 | 5.8 | ▼2.3 | 10,303 | 6.9 | ▼2.5 |
| Left | Manfred Büddemann | 6,165 | 4.1 | ▼1.7 | 7,768 | 5.2 | ▼1.6 |
| FDP | Otto Fricke | 5,447 | 3.7 | ▼8.6 | 10,901 | 7.3 | ▼12.0 |
| AfD | Heinz-Josef Hecker | 3,633 | 2.4 | | 5,753 | 3.9 | |
| Pirates | Wilhelm A. Frömgen | 3,372 | 2.3 | | 3,173 | 2.1 | ▲0.6 |
| NPD | Mirko Hilgers | 1,415 | 0.9 | 0.0 | 1,192 | 0.8 | ▲0.1 |
| PARTEI | | 538 | 0.4 | | 596 | 0.4 | |
| FW | | 529 | 0.4 | | 457 | 0.3 | |
| Volksabstimmung | | | | | 301 | 0.2 | ▲0.1 |
| PRO | | | | | 289 | 0.2 | |
| ÖDP | | | | | 165 | 0.1 | 0.0 |
| BIG | | | | | 156 | 0.1 | |
| REP | | | | | 155 | 0.1 | ▼0.1 |
| Nichtwahler | | | | | 150 | 0.1 | |
| Party of Reason | | | | | 80 | 0.1 | |
| RRP | | | | | 77 | 0.1 | ▼0.1 |
| MLPD | | | | | 42 | 0.0 | 0.0 |
| BüSo | | | | | 34 | 0.0 | 0.0 |
| PSG | | | | | 34 | 0.0 | 0.0 |
| Die Rechte | | | | | 24 | 0.0 | |
| Informal votes | | 1,858 | | | 1,579 | | |
| Total valid votes | | 149,141 | | | 149,420 | | |
| Turnout | | 150,999 | 74.7 | ▲1.4 | | | |
| CDU hold | Majority | 27,053 | 18.2 | ▲5.0 | | | |

=== 2009 election ===
Federal election (2009): Krefeld I – Neuss II
| Notes: | Blue background denotes the winner of the electorate vote. Pink background denotes a candidate elected from their party list. Yellow background denotes an electorate win by a list member, or other incumbent. A ✓ or ✗ denotes status of any incumbent, win or lose respectively. | | | | | | |
| Party | Candidate | Votes | % | ±% | Party votes | % | ±% |
|---|---|---|---|---|---|---|---|
| CDU | Ansgar Heveling | 62,639 | 42.3 | ▼5.0 | 53,252 | 35.9 | ▼2.6 |
| SPD | Bernd Scheelen | 43,087 | 29.1 | ▼9.5 | 35,551 | 24.0 | ▼9.5 |
| FDP | Otto Fricke | 18,168 | 12.3 | ▲7.2 | 28,625 | 19.3 | ▲5.6 |
| Greens | Hans Christian Markert | 12,043 | 8.1 | ▲3.7 | 13,867 | 9.4 | ▲2.2 |
| Left | Manfred Büddemann | 8,641 | 5.8 | ▲2.3 | 10,016 | 6.8 | ▲2.4 |
| Pirates | | | | | 2,267 | 1.5 | |
| FAMILIE | Michael Koesling | 2,100 | 1.4 | | 1,028 | 0.7 | ▲0.2 |
| NPD | Michael Janssen | 1,358 | 0.9 | ▲0.2 | 1,012 | 0.7 | 0.0 |
| Tierschutzpartei | | | | | 926 | 0.6 | ▲0.1 |
| RENTNER | | | | | 522 | 0.4 | |
| REP | | | | | 345 | 0.2 | 0.0 |
| Centre | | | | | 285 | 0.2 | ▲0.1 |
| RRP | | | | | 195 | 0.1 | |
| Volksabstimmung | | | | | 121 | 0.1 | 0.0 |
| ÖDP | | | | | 90 | 0.1 | |
| DVU | | | | | 60 | 0.0 | |
| MLPD | | | | | 44 | 0.0 | 0.0 |
| BüSo | | | | | 32 | 0.0 | 0.0 |
| PSG | | | | | 20 | 0.0 | 0.0 |
| Informal votes | | 1,695 | | | 1,473 | | |
| Total valid votes | | 148,036 | | | 148,258 | | |
| Turnout | | 149,731 | 73.3 | ▼6.1 | | | |
| CDU hold | Majority | 19,552 | 13.2 | ▲4.5 | | | |

=== 2005 election ===
Federal election (2005): Krefeld I – Neuss II
| Notes: | Blue background denotes the winner of the electorate vote. Pink background denotes a candidate elected from their party list. Yellow background denotes an electorate win by a list member, or other incumbent. A ✓ or ✗ denotes status of any incumbent, win or lose respectively. | | | | | | |
| Party | Candidate | Votes | % | ±% | Party votes | % | ±% |
|---|---|---|---|---|---|---|---|
| CDU | ✓ Willy Wimmer | 75,258 | 47.4 | ▲3.8 | 61,323 | 38.6 | ▼0.7 |
| SPD | Bernd Scheelen | 61,414 | 38.6 | ▼3.4 | 53,272 | 33.5 | ▼3.6 |
| FDP | Otto Fricke | 8,050 | 5.1 | ▼2.3 | 21,763 | 13.7 | ▲2.1 |
| Greens | Ursula Schauws | 6,994 | 4.4 | ▼0.9 | 11,422 | 7.2 | ▼1.3 |
| Left | Hans-Gerd Amber | 5,569 | 3.5 | ▲2.6 | 6,867 | 4.3 | ▲3.3 |
| NPD | Holger Wilke | 1,202 | 0.8 | | 1,087 | 0.7 | ▲0.5 |
| Tierschutzpartei | | | | | 798 | 0.5 | ▲0.1 |
| Familie | | | | | 763 | 0.5 | ▲0.2 |
| GRAUEN | | | | | 736 | 0.5 | ▲0.2 |
| REP | | | | | 444 | 0.3 | |
| PARTEI | Claus-Dieter Prussia | 442 | 0.3 | | | | |
| Centre | | | | | 137 | 0.1 | ▲0.1 |
| From Now on... Democracy Through Referendum | | | | | 129 | 0.1 | |
| PBC | | | | | 129 | 0.0 | |
| MLPD | | | | | 77 | 0.0 | |
| Socialist Equality Party | | | | | 61 | 0.0 | |
| BüSo | | | | | 38 | 0.0 | 0.0 |
| Informal votes | | 2,218 | | | 2,108 | | |
| Total valid votes | | 158,929 | | | 159,039 | | |
| Turnout | | 161,147 | 79.4 | ▼9.3 | | | |
| CDU hold | Majority | 13,844 | 8.8 | | | | |
