= Stommeln station =

Railway station in Pulheim, Germany

Stommeln
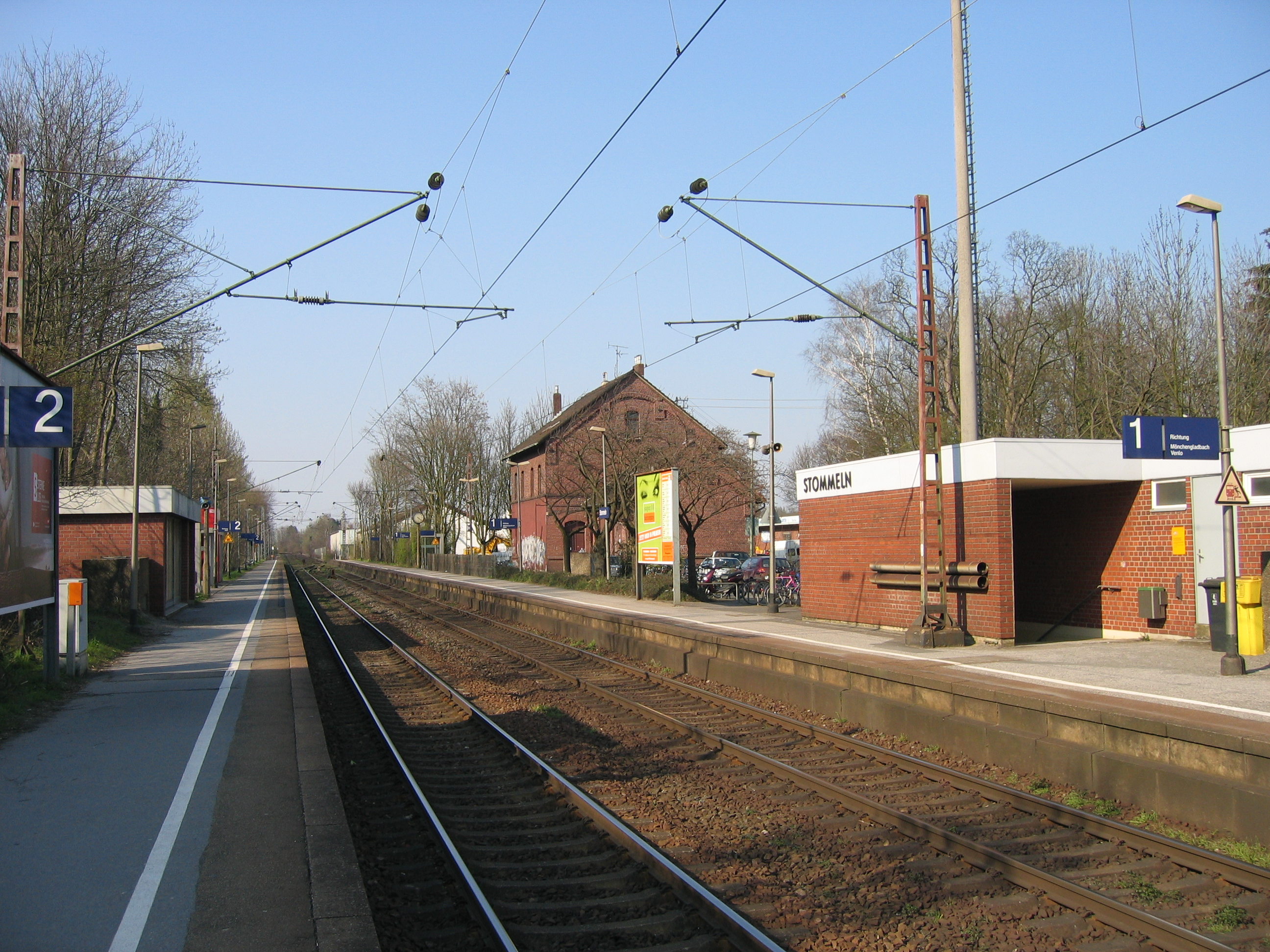
- Stommeln station

General information
- Location: Bahnhofstr., Stommeln, Pulheim, NRW; Germany
- Coordinates: 51°01′05″N 6°45′08″E
- Line: Cologne–Mönchengladbach railway
- Platforms: 2

Construction
- Accessible: Yes

Other information
- Station code: 6040
- DS100 code: KSOM
- IBNR: 8005746
- Category: 5
- Fare zone: VRS: 2810
- Website: www.bahnhof.de

History
- Opened: October 1898

Services
Preceding station	DB Regio NRW	Following station
Rommerskirchen towards Mönchengladbach Hbf	RE 8	Pulheim towards Koblenz Hbf
Rommerskirchen towards Mönchengladbach Hbf	RB 27	Pulheim towards Koblenz Hbf
Location

Stommeln is a station on the Cologne–Mönchengladbach railway in Rhein-Erft-Kreis in the German state of North Rhine-Westphalia. It is served by the Rhein-Erft-Bahn (RB27) and the Rhein-Erft-Express (RE8).

== History ==
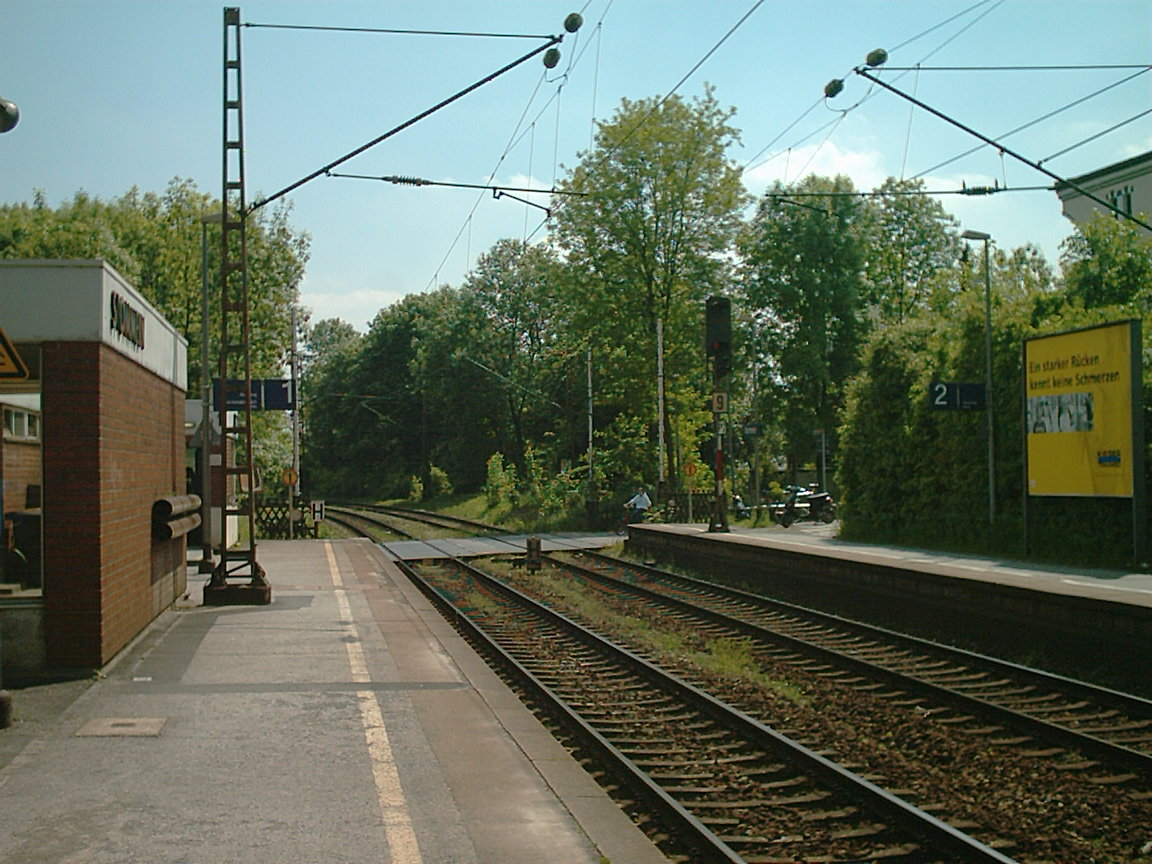
View to the south, the newer station building is to the left

Stommeln station was opened on 1 March 1898 with a one-track line connecting towards Grevenbroich. The rest of the line towards Cologne was opened one year later, when the work had been completed. The line’s second tracks was completed in 1905.

In the 1970s, the old station building was closed down and a new small and plain building opened directly at the barrier about 100 metres further south. The old station building served as a pub in the 1960s and was privatised.

In 1999, the siding, which had previously been used for special trains or for loading operations, was removed at the north end of the station and replaced by an expansion of the neighbouring warehouse and a construction material business. The turnout points were not removed.

In March 2001, the station was modernised again and adapted to Deutsche Bahn’s new colour scheme.

From December 2006 to December 2009, the trains of the RB27 running between 9 am and 4 pm ended in Stommeln and ran empty from there to Rommerskirchen. Today such trips continue carrying passengers as far as Rommerskirchen and terminate there.

In April 2008, the station building, which was built in the 1970s, was also closed; since then the line has been remotely controlled from the Duisburg operating center. The position of the local dispatcher, who had previously been based in the signal box, was abolished at that time. This required new barriers to be installed and the main signal was removed at the station.

The crossovers at the northern end of the station were also removed in December 2008.

The station was thoroughly modernised in 2011 and the site was redesigned. A new car park was opened to the south of the barrier and the old car park was reduced in size and converted into a waiting area and a parking area for taxis and bicycles. In addition, electronic passenger information systems were installed on the platforms and a kiosk was opened on the western platform 2 for trains towards Cologne.

== Freight and loading yard ==
The Stommeln freight and loading yard was closed at the end of the 1950s. Today, there are some railway tracks and buildings with loading ramps on the site of a construction material business. The freight yard was mainly used for the loading of steel parts, which were produced in the former rolling mill in neighbouring Pulheim.

The freight yard was attacked by British bombers and damaged in the Second World War.

== Services ==
The station is served by RE8 services hourly. On working days, it is also served by RB27 services, which together provide a service every half-hour to Mönchengladbach and Cologne and Koblenz.

Line	Line name	Route	Frequency
RE 8	Rhein-Erft-Express	Mönchengladbach – Rheydt-Odenkirchen – Grevenbroich – Rommerskirchen – Stommeln – Cologne – Cologne/Bonn Airport – Bonn-Beuel – Bad Honnef (Rhein) – Linz (Rhein) – Neuwied – Koblenz-Ehrenbreitstein – Koblenz	Hourly
RB 27	Rhein-Erft-Bahn	(Mönchengladbach – Rheydt-Odenkirchen – Grevenbroich –) Rommerskirchen – Stommeln – Cologne – Porz – Bonn-Beuel – Bad Honnef (Rhein) – Linz (Rhein) – Neuwied – Koblenz Stadtmitte – Koblenz	Hourly
