= Hochneukirch station =

Railway station in Germany

Hochneukirch
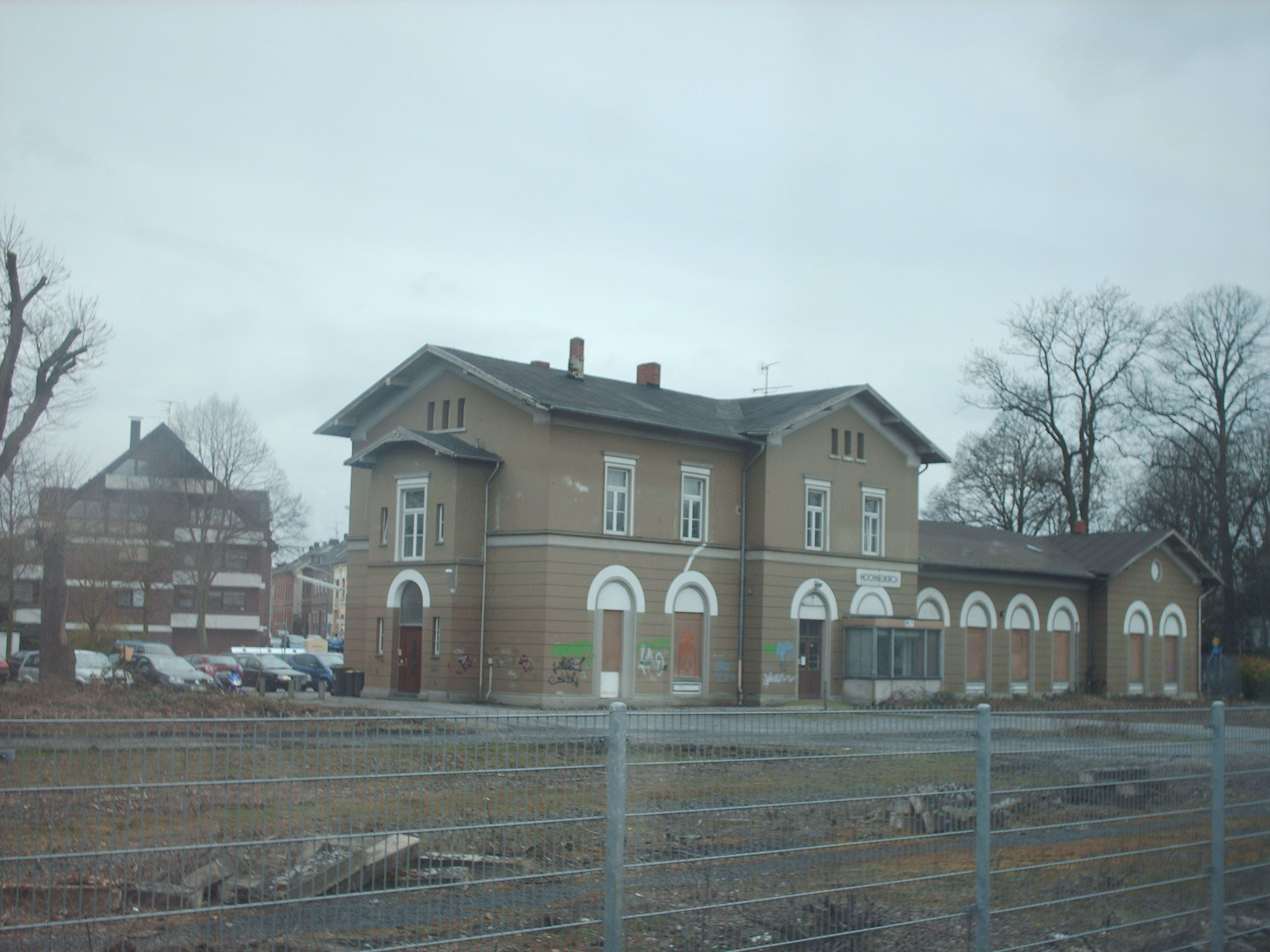
- Hochneukirch station

General information
- Location: Bahnhofstr. 87, Hochneukirch, Jüchen, NRW; Germany
- Coordinates: 51°06′12″N 6°27′57″E
- Lines: Cologne–Mönchengladbach railway Hochneukirch–Stolberg (former)
- Platforms: 2

Construction
- Accessible: No

Other information
- Station code: 2804
- DS100 code: KHOK
- IBNR: 8000390
- Category: 6
- Fare zone: VRR: 720; VRS: 1720 (VRR transitional tariff)
- Website: www.bahnhof.de

History
- Opened: 1873
- Former names: Neukirchen; Hoch-Neukirch

Services
Preceding station	DB Regio NRW	Following station
Rheydt-Odenkirchen towards Mönchengladbach Hbf	RE 8	Jüchen towards Koblenz Hbf
Rheydt-Odenkirchen towards Mönchengladbach Hbf	RB 27	Jüchen towards Koblenz Hbf
Location

Hochneukirch is a station in Jüchen in the German state of North Rhine-Westphalia. It is located on the Cologne–Mönchengladbach railway and the closed Mönchengladbach–Stolberg railway.

== History ==
In 1873, the station was established on the eastern edge of Hochneukirch (at that time still called Neukirchen, now part of Jüchen), stimulating the emerging textile industry. The station (which is located at line km 11.8) is connected to the centre by Bahnhofstraße ("station street"). The former Mönchengladbach–Stolberg railway connected with the Cologne–Mönchengladbach railway and both lines then used the same tracks to Rheydt-Odenkirchen station.

=== Course of the lines ===
In 1873, the place received a rail connection from Mönchengladbach to Stolberg. The first train of the Bergisch-Markisch Railway Company (Bergisch-Märkische Eisenbahn-Gesellschaft) ran from Mönchengladbach continued via Jülich and Eschweiler-Aue to Stolberg on the Hochneukirch–Stolberg railway.

The railway to Cologne was opened in 1889. This line was built parallel with the existing line.

The station building is still preserved and has included a signal box designated Hf since 1964. This signal box was abandoned with the installation of an electronic interlocking in 2007. The island platform is equipped with a waiting room and a ticket machine. The former freight shed is still preserved south of the entrance building.

=== Development history ===
The city of Mönchengladbach and its chamber of commerce presented the railway minister with a proposal for a Cologne–Mönchengladbach railway running between Mönchengladbach and Grevenbroich via Giesenkirchen instead of Hochneukirch. Mönchengladbach claimed this route would lead to more development in its hinterland. But the manufacturers and people of Hochneukirch supported a route via Hochneukirch and Grevenbroich to Cologne. The manufacturer Peter Busch contacted some deputies that he was familiar with in the Berlin Landtag and the pastor Martin Köllen addressed himself to the Oberhofmeister (chief of staff) of the Empress Augusta, Count Nesselrode-Ehreshoven. Through the intermediation of the count, Köllen was able to communicate his wishes to the railway minister Albert von Maybach in writing. As a result of his personal support, the railway line was built through Hochneukirch and opened in 1889. Peter Busch and Martin Köllen are commemorated in Hochneukirch for their dedication with streets named after them to the left and right of the station.

The tracks had to be crossed to get to the village of Hackhausen to the north of the station. In the early years, this level crossing was unsecured; barriers were erected after a rail disaster. In 1909, the building of another line was proposed from Erkelenz via Wanlo and Keyenberg to Hochneukirch, but it was never built due to lack of funds. In 1911, a bridge was built over the railway for the road between Hochneukirch and Hackhausen.

=== Decline ===
In 1967, the bridge had to be raised 60 centimetres and the track lowered to allow the installation of the overhead line for the electrification of the line. The old railway bridge was demolished in 1988 and replaced by a new reinforced concrete bridge. On 30 May 1980, passenger traffic on the line to Stolberg was discontinued and the tracks of the line to Jülich were dismantled. Freight transport to Ameln continued until 1 June 1984. Freight traffic was also abandoned in 1987. Today, the remaining two platform tracks to Rheydt and Cologne still have the track numbers of 9 and 10 although tracks 1–8 were removed with the dismantling of the line to Jülich. The closure of the Stolberg line meant that the placement of the still well-preserved entrance building is unusual today. This is about 40 metres from the island platform. The pedestrian subway to the island platform ends in an open field. Between the remaining rail tracks and the front of the reception building, there is now a parking lot. This was part of a project that involved the building of 41 apartments for the elderly and a community hall at the station and in new buildings. The street to this small building area is called Falkensteinstrasse after a local Jewish family.

== Services ==
The station is served by RE8 services hourly. During the peak hour on working days, it is also served by RB27 services, which together provide a service every half-hour to Mönchengladbach and Cologne and Koblenz.

Line	Line name	Route	Frequency
RE 8	Rhein-Erft-Express	Mönchengladbach – Rheydt-Odenkirchen – Hochneukirch – Grevenbroich – Rommerskirchen – Cologne – Cologne/Bonn Airport – Bonn-Beuel – Bad Honnef (Rhein) – Linz (Rhein) – Neuwied – Koblenz-Ehrenbreitstein – Koblenz	Hourly
RB 27	Rhein-Erft-Bahn	(Mönchengladbach – Rheydt-Odenkirchen – Hochneukirch – Grevenbroich –) Rommerskirchen – Cologne – Porz – Bonn-Beuel – Bad Honnef (Rhein) – Linz (Rhein) – Neuwied – Koblenz Stadtmitte – Koblenz	Hourly
