= Pulheim station =

Railway station in Pulheim, Germany

Pulheim
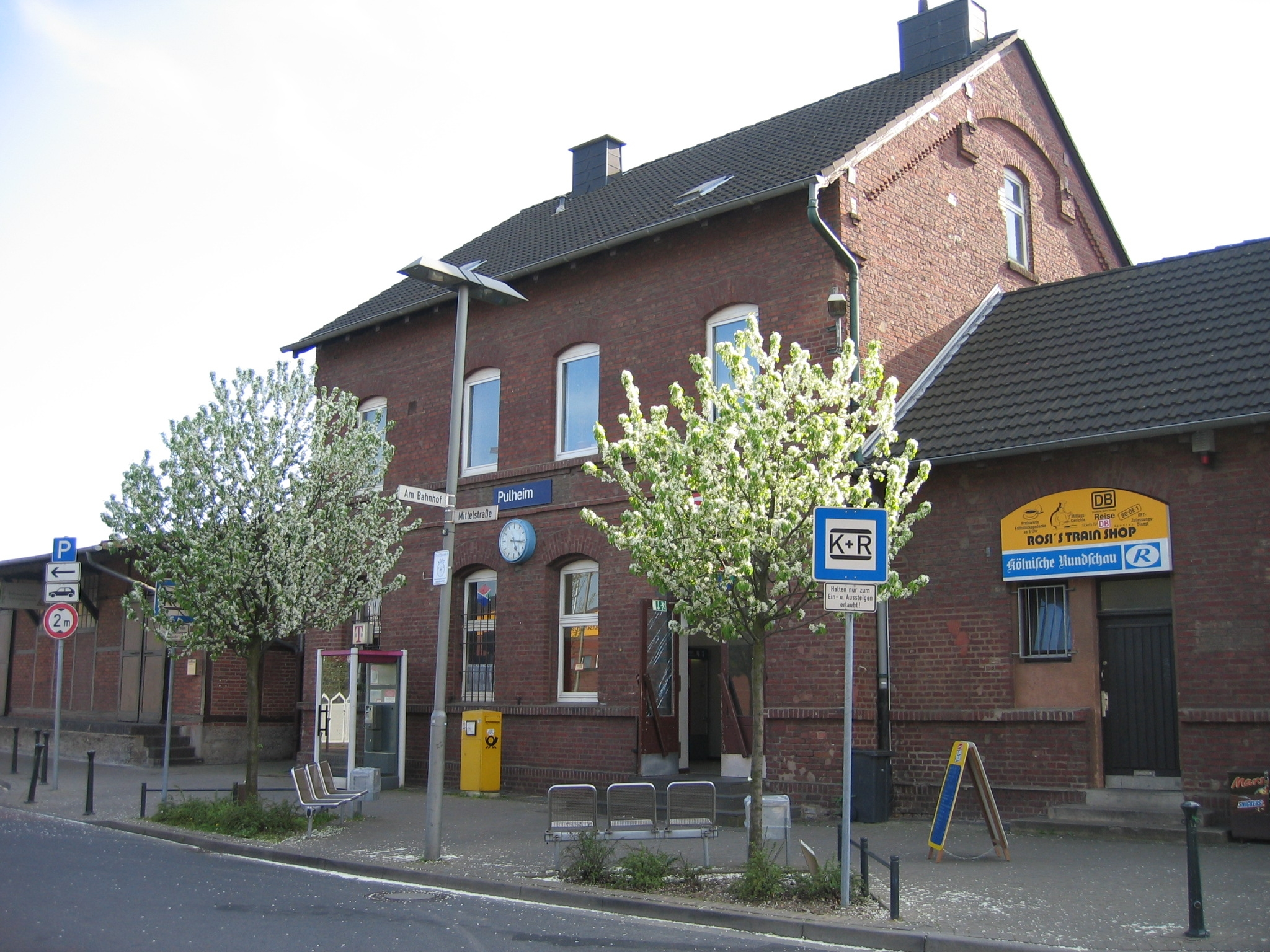
- Pulheim station

General information
- Location: Mittelstr. 1, Pulheim, NRW; Germany
- Coordinates: 50°59′53″N 6°47′50″E
- Line: Cologne–Mönchengladbach railway
- Platforms: 2

Construction
- Accessible: Yes

Other information
- Station code: 5056
- DS100 code: KPUL
- IBNR: 8004898
- Category: 5
- Fare zone: VRS: 2810
- Website: www.bahnhof.de

History
- Opened: April 1899

Services
Preceding station	DB Regio NRW	Following station
Stommeln towards Mönchengladbach Hbf	RE 8	Köln-Ehrenfeld towards Koblenz Hbf
Stommeln towards Mönchengladbach Hbf	RB 27	Köln-Ehrenfeld towards Koblenz Hbf
Location

Pulheim is a station in the city of Pulheim in the German state of North Rhine-Westphalia. It is on the Cologne–Mönchengladbach railway. It lies between Köln-Bocklemünd station, which was closed the 1970s, and Stommeln station, 11.5 km from Köln-Ehrenfeld station.

The railway line was opened on 1 April 1899 after years of dispute over the precise course of the line. The section from Grevenbroich to Pulheim had actually been completed six months earlier. Pulheim station is on the south-western edge of the old town with the tracks running southeast–northwest. Until 2007, the building had housed a local dispatcher; the route is now controlled from Duisburg.

== Station building ==
The two-storey four-storey station building is similar to the Prussian standard type used at many stations, such as the neighbouring Stommeln station, but the freight shed is directly attached here, or Rommerskirchen station. While on the ground floor there were administrative rooms of the dispatcher and a ticket office, railway accommodation was located on the upper floor. A one-storey maintenance room and a goods shed built of bricks were added. It is noteworthy that the roof surfaces supported by purlins project only slightly over the wall surfaces at Pulheim station, and that elements, such as cornices and arches, appear in recess in the uniform wall built in brick.

The station building, which is on the side towards the city, was completed in 1898 and was given heritage protection on 16 June 1992. Today it contains a residence house and a kiosk.

== Precinct ==
Extensive construction measures, which were completed in 2007 after ten years of work, have converted the layout from an island platform to two outer platforms. The southern part of the railway precinct is now covered by a car park.

In various renovations carried out by Deutsche Bahn, most recently in the 1990s, the loading track was removed, waiting rooms built of bricks were erected on both platforms and a station subway with stairs was built under the tracks.

== Services ==
The station is served by RE8 services hourly. On working days, it is also served by RB27 services, which together provide a service every half-hour to Rommerskirchen (or Mönchengladbach in the peak) and to Cologne and Koblenz.

Line	Line name	Route	Frequency
RE 8	Rhein-Erft-Express	Mönchengladbach – Rheydt-Odenkirchen – Grevenbroich – Rommerskirchen – Pulheim – Cologne – Cologne/Bonn Airport – Bonn-Beuel – Bad Honnef (Rhein) – Linz (Rhein) – Neuwied – Koblenz-Ehrenbreitstein – Koblenz	Hourly
RB 27	Rhein-Erft-Bahn	(Mönchengladbach – Rheydt-Odenkirchen – Grevenbroich –) Rommerskirchen – Pulheim – Cologne – Porz – Bonn-Beuel – Bad Honnef (Rhein) – Linz (Rhein) – Neuwied – Koblenz Stadtmitte – Koblenz	Hourly
