= Richard Glücks =

German SS officer (1889–1945)

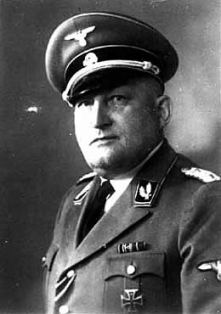
- Born: 22 April 1889; Odenkirchen, Germany
- Died: 10 May 1945 (aged 56); Flensburg, Germany
- Military career
- Allegiance: German Empire; Weimar Republic; Nazi Germany
- Branch: Schutzstaffel
- Service years: 1915–1945
- Rank: SS-Gruppenführer
- Service number: NSDAP #214,855; SS #58,706
- Unit: SS-Totenkopfverbände
- Conflicts: World War I World War II
- Other work: One of the primary organisers of The Holocaust.

Richard Glücks (German: [ˈʁɪçaʁt ˈɡlʏks]; 22 April 1889 – 10 May 1945) was a high-ranking German SS functionary during the Nazi era. From November 1939 until the end of World War II, he commanded the Concentration Camps Inspectorate, later integrated into the SS Main Economic and Administrative Office as "Amt D". Reporting first to Theodor Eicke, then to SS chief Heinrich Himmler and finally to Oswald Pohl, he became Inspector of Concentration Camps. He retained this position despite Himmler, in whose presence Glücks would panic, having little confidence in him. Glücks was responsible for the forced labour of camp inmates and was the supervisor for the medical practices in the camps, ranging from Nazi human experimentation to the implementation of the "Final Solution", in particular the mass murder of inmates with Zyklon B gas. After Germany capitulated, Glücks committed suicide by swallowing a potassium cyanide capsule.

== Early life ==
Glücks was born 1889, in Odenkirchen in the Rhineland. Having completed gymnasium in Düsseldorf, he worked in his father's business, a fire insurance agency. In 1909, Glücks joined the army for one year as a volunteer, serving in the artillery. In 1913, he was in England, and later moved to Argentina as a trader. When World War I broke out, Glücks returned to Germany under a false identity on a Norwegian ship in January 1915 and joined the army again. During the war, he eventually became the commander of an artillery unit and was awarded the Iron Cross I and II. Glücks fought at the Battle of Verdun and the Battle of the Somme. After the war, he became a liaison officer between the German forces and the Military Inter-Allied Commission of Control, the allied body for controlling the restrictions placed upon Germany in the Treaty of Versailles regarding re-armament and strength of their armed forces. Until 1924, he stayed in that position, before joining the staff of the 6th Prussian Division. He also served in the Freikorps.

== Rise under the Nazi regime ==
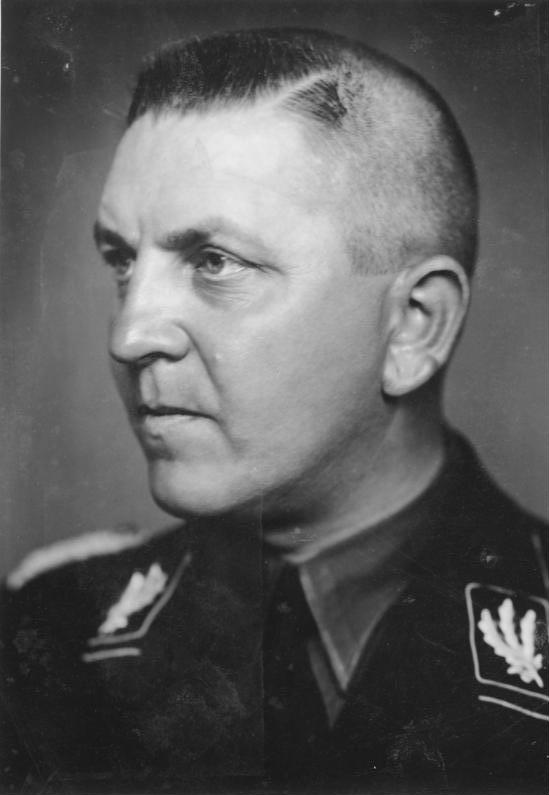
Concentration Camp Inspector Theodor Eicke, to whom Glücks was chief of staff.

In 1930, Glücks joined the NSDAP and two years later the SS.

From 6 September 1933 to 20 June 1935, Glücks was a member of the staff of the SS-Group "West" and rose to the rank of an SS-Sturmbannführer. Historian Nikolaus Wachsmann claims that while lacking in charisma, Glücks possessed an "abundance of ideological commitment".

On 1 April 1936, Glücks became the chief of staff to Theodor Eicke, who was then Concentration Camps Inspector and head of the SS-Wachverbände.

== Concentration Camps Inspector ==
When Eicke became field commander of the SS Division Totenkopf during the summer of 1939, Glücks was promoted by Himmler on 15 November 1939 as Eicke's successor to the post of Concentration Camps Inspector. In contrast with the warm relation between Himmler and the older Eicke, Glücks only rarely met with Himmler, who promoted him not for his leadership competencies but for his ability to "provide the administrative continuity" with Eicke's policies. Less a reflection of Glücks' energy and aptitude, his rise in power was more about Eicke's ineffectual managerial skills. Auschwitz commandant Rudolf Hoess noted that Glücks had an "almost unbelievable fear" of Himmler and went to pieces when he had to deal with him. Glücks made few changes once taking over, leaving the organisational structure intact as Eicke had set it up; the same uncompromising rigidity was carried out at the camps—there was no rehabilitation and no effort to exploit the working potential of inmates. Because Glücks never served inside a concentration camp, some senior camp members were suspicious and considered him nothing more than a desk-side bureaucrat. In terms of his leadership style, he preferred men of action and allowed them some autonomy in operating their respective camps. Glücks has been termed "unimaginative, lacking in energy if not lazy," and even "unperceptive," which may account to some extent for his hands-off approach.

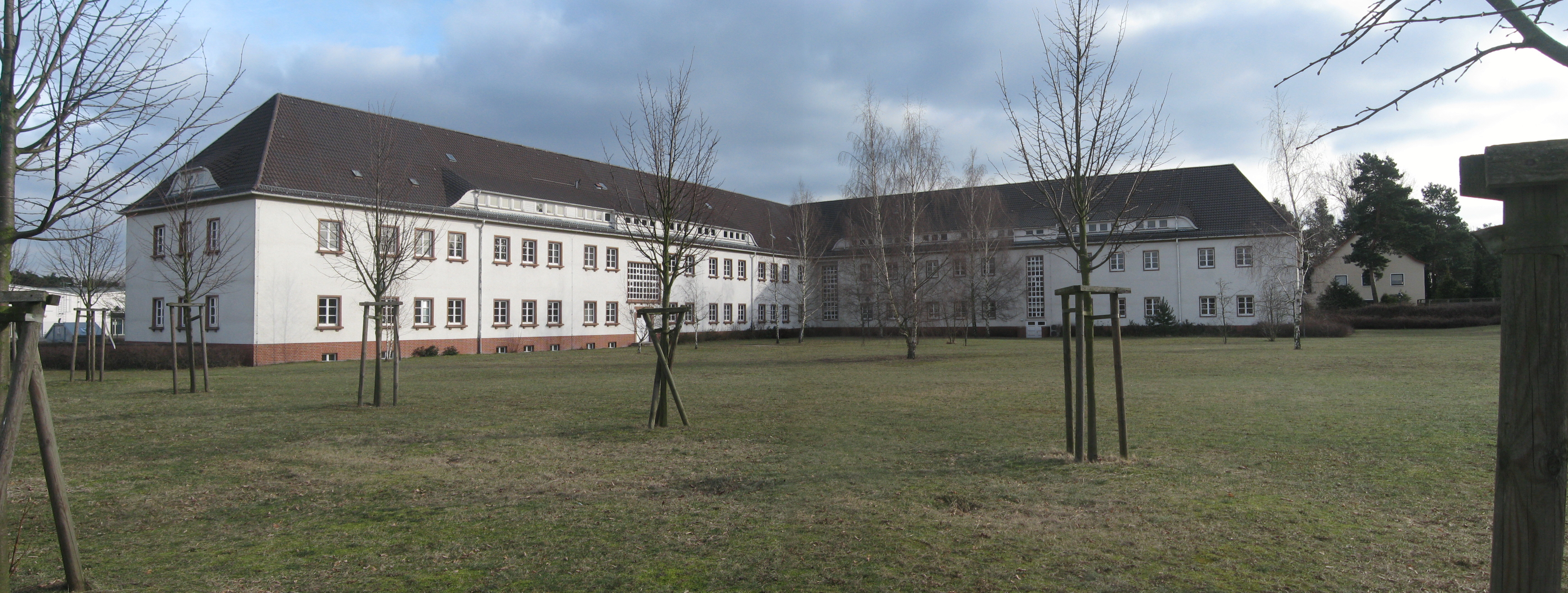
The T-building in Sachsenhausen concentration camp, home of the Concentration Camps Inspectorate from 1938

Glücks' responsibilities at first mainly covered the use of concentration camp inmates for forced labour. In this phase, he urged camp commandants to lower the death rate in the camps as it went counter to the economic objectives his department was to fulfil. Other orders of his were to ask for the inmates to be made to work continuously. On 21 February 1940, it was Glücks who recommended Auschwitz, a former Austrian cavalry barracks, as a suitable site for a new concentration camp to Himmler and Reinhard Heydrich. On 1 March 1941, Glücks accompanied Himmler and several chief directors of I.G. Farben on a visit to Auschwitz. It was decided that the camp would be expanded to accommodate up to 30,000 prisoners, an additional camp capable of housing 100,000 POWs would be established at nearby Birkenau and that a factory would be constructed in proximity with the camp prisoners placed at I.G. Farben's disposal.

On 20 April 1941, Glücks was promoted to the rank of SS-Brigadeführer; in November 1943, he was made SS-Gruppenführer and a Generalleutnant of the Waffen-SS. Just a few days after the Wannsee Conference in January 1942, Himmler ordered Glücks to prepare the camps for the immediate arrival of 100,000 Jewish men and 50,000 women being evacuated from the Reich as labourers in lieu of the diminishing availability of Russian prisoners. In February 1942, the CCI became Amt D of the SS Main Economic and Administrative Office under SS-Obergruppenführer Pohl. By March 1942, Glücks was routinely receiving direct instructions from the head engineer and SS General Hans Kammler, to meet the productivity demands of SS engineers.

From 1942 on, he was increasingly involved in the implementation of the "Final Solution", along with his new direct superior Pohl. To oversee the coordination of camp related activities, which varied from the medical concerns of personnel and prisoners, the status of construction projects and the progress of extermination operations, Glücks attended weekly meetings chaired by Pohl. Glücks never attempted to outshine his superior and was quite aware of his subordination to Pohl.

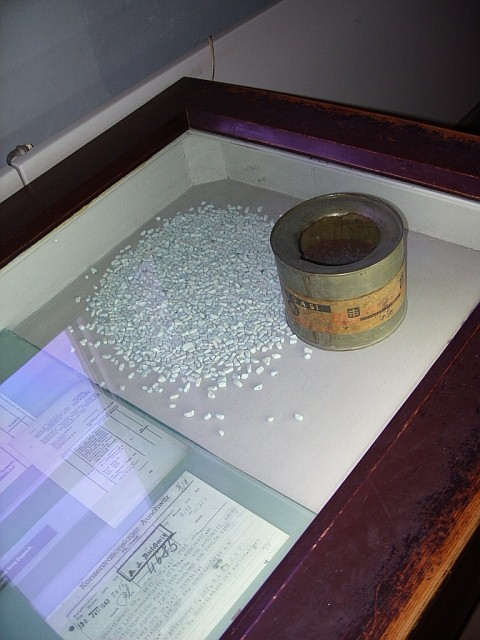
A can of Zyklon B with adsorbent granules and original signed documents detailing ordering of Zyklon B as "materials for Jewish resettlement" (on display at Auschwitz-Birkenau State Museum)

In July 1942, he participated in a planning meeting with Himmler on the topic of medical experiments on camp inmates. From several visits to the camps at Auschwitz, Glücks was well aware of the mass murders and other atrocities committed there. Correspondingly, Hoess routinely informed Glücks on the status of the extermination activities. During one of his inspection-tour visits to Auschwitz in 1943, Glücks complained about the unfavourable location of the crematoria, since all types of people would be able to "gaze" at the structures. Responding to this observation, Hoess ordered a row of trees planted between Crematoria I and II. When visits from high officials from the Reich or the Nazi Party took place, the administration was instructed by Glücks to avoid showing the crematoria to them; if questions arose about smoke coming from the chimneys, the installation personnel were to tell the visitors that corpses were being burned as a result of epidemics.

Some time in December 1942, after discovering 70,000 out of 136,000 incoming prisoners had died almost as fast as they arrived, he issued a directive to the camp doctors: "The best camp doctor in a concentration camp is that doctor who holds the work capacity among inmates at its highest possible level ... Toward this end it is necessary that the camp doctors take a personal interest and appear on location at work sites."

Before the death marches of early 1945 started, Glücks reiterated a July 1944 directive to camp commanders that during "emergency situations," they were to follow the instructions of the regional HSSPF (Höherer SS- und Polizeiführer) commanders. Between 250,000 and 400,000 additional people died as a result of these death marches.

Glücks was "the RSHA man responsible for the entire network of concentration camps" and his authority extended to the largest and most infamous of them all, Auschwitz. Nearly all the important matters concerning the concentration camps were "decided directly between the Inspector of Concentration Camps and the Reichsführer-SS." In January 1945, Glücks was decorated for his contributions to the Reich in managing the fifteen largest camps and the five-hundred satellite camps which employed upwards of 40,000 members of the SS. Glücks' role in the Holocaust "cannot be over-emphasized" as he, together with Pohl, oversaw the entire Nazi camp system and the persecution network it represented.

== Death ==
When the SS Main Economic and Administrative Office premises in Berlin were destroyed by Allied bombing on 16 April 1945, the office was moved to Born auf dem Darß in Pomerania on the Baltic Sea. Owing to the advances of the Red Army forces, Glücks and his wife fled to Flensburg.

After the capitulation of Germany, he is believed to have committed suicide on 10 May 1945 by swallowing a capsule of potassium cyanide at the Mürwik naval base in Flensburg-Mürwik, although the lack of official records or photos gave rise to speculation about his ultimate fate.

== Fictional references ==
- In the 1972 thriller novel The Odessa File (and subdequent movie) set in 1963 Glücks is still alive and head of the ODESSA (an organisation dedicated to protecting members of the SS from prosecution for war crimes and the destruction of the state of Israel).
- Glücks appears as a minor character in the Jonathan Glazer film The Zone of Interest (2023).

== See also ==
- List SS-Gruppenführer
- List of SS personnel
- Pohl Trial
