= Rheydt-Odenkirchen station =

Railway station in Germany

Rheydt Odenkirchen
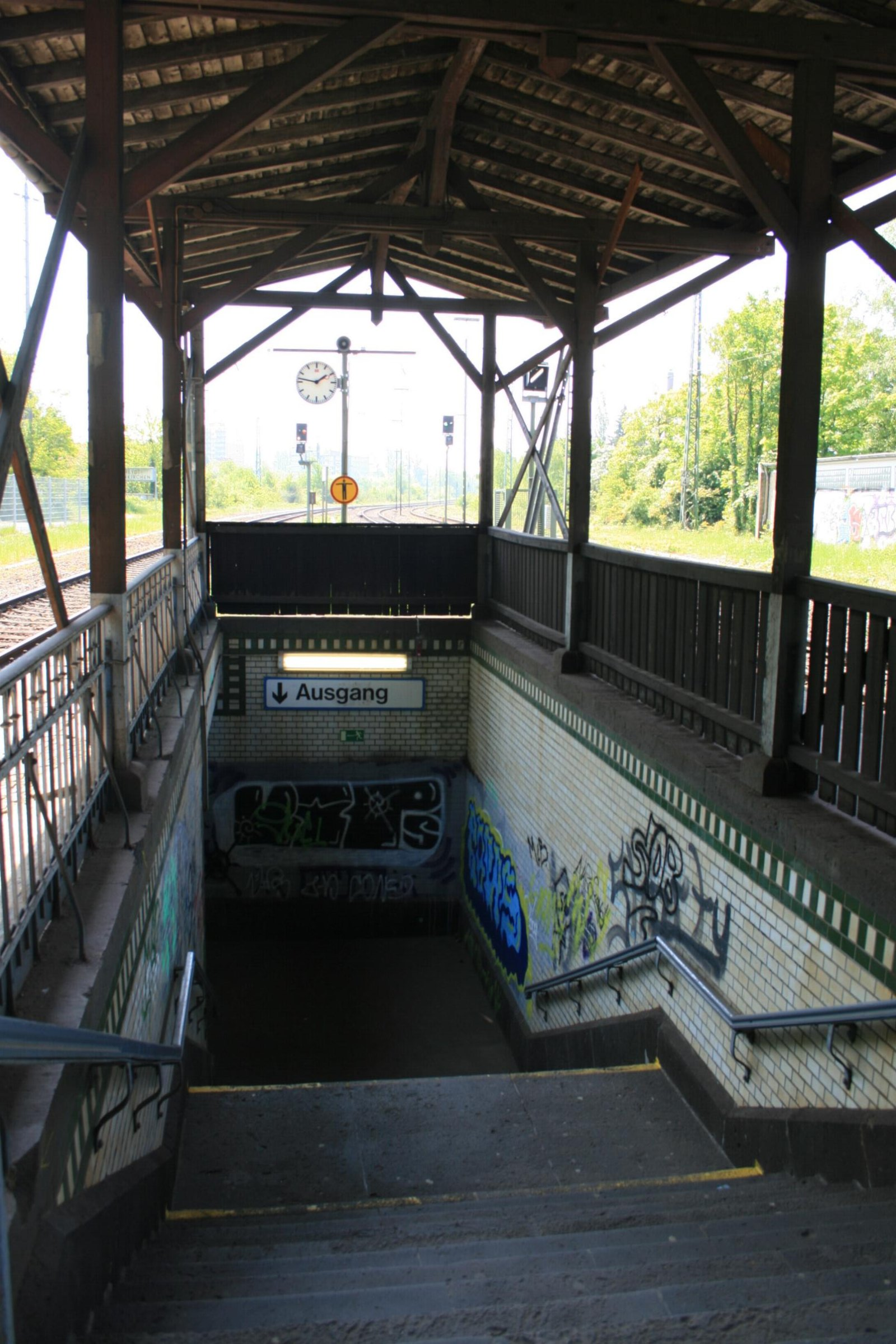
- Platform canopy over platform subway

General information
- Location: Korbleiche 2a, Odenkirchen, Mönchengladbach, NRW; Germany
- Coordinates: 51°08′17″N 6°26′47″E
- Lines: Mönchengladbach–Stolberg km 6.9; Rheydt–Köln-Ehrenfeld km 46.4
- Platforms: 2

Construction
- Accessible: Yes

Other information
- Station code: 5261
- DS100 code: KRYO
- IBNR: 8005073
- Category: 6
- Fare zone: VRR: 506; VRS: 1500 (VRR transitional tariff)
- Website: www.bahnhof.de

History
- Opened: 1 January 1870
- Former names: Odenkirchen

Services
Preceding station	DB Regio NRW	Following station
Rheydt Hbf towards Mönchengladbach Hbf	RE 8	Hochneukirch towards Koblenz Hbf
Rheydt Hbf towards Mönchengladbach Hbf	RB 27	Hochneukirch towards Koblenz Hbf
Location

Rheydt-Odenkirchen is a station in the Mönchengladbach suburb of Odenkirchen in the German state of North Rhine-Westphalia.

== History ==
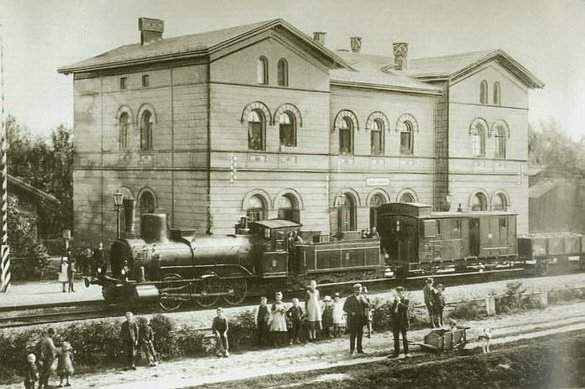
Odenkirchen station in 1874

The station was opened under the name of Odenkirchen in February 1870 at line kilometre 6.9 on the original line from Mönchengladbach. Between 1905 and 1945 there was a single-track connection to Rheydt freight yard. In 1908, a parallel route was built to Rheydt Hauptbahnhof, which is now part of the Cologne–Mönchengladbach railway. On 1 August 1929, Odenkirchen was merged with Rheydt, München-Gladbach, Giesenkirchen and Schelsen to form the new city of Gladbach-Rheydt. This city was dissolved again in 1933, but Odenkirchen, Giesenkirchen and Schelsen stayed with Rheydt and the station was renamed Rheydt-Odenkirchen in 1962. This name was not changed with the reincorporation of Rheydt into Mönchengladbach (its new name) on 1 January 1975.

Since 11 October 2004, the wooden canopy on platform 2 and the underpass between platforms 1 and 2 have been under heritage protection. The entrance building was demolished in the spring of 2012 and it was replaced by parking spaces.

== Infrastructure ==
=== Platform and tracks ===
Today, Odenkirchen station has an island platform with two edges. They are each 200 m long and 38 cm high. In February 2016, the Verkehrsverbund Rhein-Ruhr announced that the platform would be raised to 76 cm by 2023 at the latest, and the station facilities would be modernised as part of the Modernisierungsoffensive 3 (modernisation campaign, MOF 3)).

=== Platform canopy ===
The platform canopy with underpass was built in 1912/13. It was included as item K 086 in the heritage list of the city of Mönchengladbach on 23 January 2004.

Odenkirchen station is located west of the street of Kohrbleiche. The about 80 m long and about 7.5 m wide platform canopy is located on the island platform between tracks 6 and 7. It consists of a series of 18 legged pairs of columns, which are stiffened by construction with struts, purlins and rafters. The columns stand on pedestals (predominantly made from basalt). The wooden beams of the canopy originally were originally painted dark red and the upper side of the roof was painted white. The roofs are strongly weathered.

The canopy covers the entrance to the pedestrian subway, where white-glazed tile façades with a green frieze at the top of the walls are preserved. There are also basalt blocks, handrails and iron balustrades with oval decorative elements between the vertical struts and horizontal bands.

The western side of the staircase and the southern side of the stairway have been replaced by a wooden covering instead of the metal railings. The historic roofing of the underpass directly in front of the station building was also preserved until December 2003, but it was later dismantled.

== Services ==
The station is served by RE8 services hourly. During the peak hour on working days, it is also served by RB27 services, which together provide a service every half-hour to Mönchengladbach and Cologne and Koblenz.

Line	Line name	Route	Frequency
RE 8	Rhein-Erft-Express	Mönchengladbach – Rheydt-Odenkirchen – Grevenbroich – Rommerskirchen – Cologne – Cologne/Bonn Airport – Bonn-Beuel – Bad Honnef (Rhein) – Linz (Rhein) – Neuwied – Koblenz-Ehrenbreitstein – Koblenz	Hourly
RB 27	Rhein-Erft-Bahn	(Mönchengladbach – Rheydt-Odenkirchen – Grevenbroich –) Rommerskirchen – Cologne – Porz – Bonn-Beuel – Bad Honnef (Rhein) – Linz (Rhein) – Neuwied – Koblenz Stadtmitte – Koblenz	Hourly
