= Peter Bamm =

German writer

- Born: Curt Emmrich; 20 October 1897; Hochneukirch, Germany
- Died: 30 March 1975 (aged 77); Zollikon, Switzerland
- Occupations: Writer, journalist, physician
- Writing career
- Language: German
- Genres: Essay, travel writing, biography, journalism
- Notable works: Die unsichtbare Flagge * Alexander oder die Verwandlung der Welt
- Notable awards: Commander's Cross of the Order of Merit of the Federal Republic of Germany

Peter Bamm (a pen name; his real name was Curt Emmrich; 20 October 1897 in Hochneukirch, now part of Jüchen, Germany – 30 March 1975 in Zollikon, Switzerland) was a German writer.

Peter Bamm volunteered for military service in World War I, after which he studied medicine and sinology in Munich, Göttingen and Freiburg im Breisgau. As a ship's doctor he travelled the world a great deal before eventually settling in Berlin-Wedding.

During World War II he served as a military doctor on the Russian Front, and later described his experiences in the book Die Unsichtbare Flagge (The Invisible Flag). After the war he travelled for study purposes between 1952 and 1957 in the Near and Middle East, after which he wrote as a journalist and feature writer for a number of Berlin newspapers.

He is buried in the Stöcken Cemetery in Hanover.

== Works ==
Peter Bamm published many journalistic pieces, many of them extremely witty and ironic. He also wrote scientific and medical essays, culture-historical travel books and an autobiography.

- Ex ovo ("Out of the Egg") (essays about medicine), 1948
- Die unsichtbare Flagge ("The Invisible Flag") (account of his war experiences), 1952
- Frühe Stätten der Christenheit ("Early Sites of Christianity") (travel book), 1955
- Wiege unserer Welt ("Cradle of Our World"), 1958 (ed.)
- Welten des Glaubens ("Worlds of Faith"), 1959
- Frühe Stätten der Christenheit ("The Kingdoms of Christ: From the Days of the Apostles to the Middle Ages"), 1959
- An den Küsten des Lichts ("On the Coasts of Light") (travel book), 1961
- Alexander oder die Verwandlung der Welt ("Alexander, or The Transformation of the World") (biography), 1965
- Alexander der Große. Ein königliches Leben ("Alexander the Great. A Royal Life"), 1968
- Anarchie mit Liebe ("Anarchy with Love") (collection of essays)
- Eines Menschen Zeit ("Time of a Human Being") (autobiography), 1972
- Am Rande der Schöpfung ("On the Edge of Creation") (essays and articles), 1974
