= Willibert Kremer =

German footballer and manager (1939–2021)

Personal information
- Date of birth: 15 October 1939
- Place of birth: Hochneukirch, Rhineland, Prussia, Germany
- Date of death: 24 December 2021 (aged 82)
- Height: 1.70 m (5 ft 7 in)
- Positions: Striker; midfielder

Senior career*
Years	Team	Apps	(Gls)
1961–1962	Borussia Mönchengladbach	14	(1)
1962–1964	Viktoria Köln	26	(4)
1964–1966	Hertha BSC	28	(4)
1966–1971	MSV Duisburg	91	(6)

Managerial career
- 1973–1976: MSV Duisburg
- 1976–1981: Bayer Leverkusen
- 1982: 1860 Munich
- 1982–1985: Fortuna Düsseldorf
- 1985–1986: Eintracht Braunschweig
- 1989–1992: MSV Duisburg
- 1992–1993: Tennis Borussia Berlin
- 1994–1995: Tennis Borussia Berlin
- * Club domestic league appearances and goals

Willibert Kremer (15 October 1939 – 24 December 2021) was a German football coach and player.

== Honours ==
=== As a coach ===
- DFB-Pokal finalist: 1974–75
