= Odenkirk =

Odenkirk is an anglicized variant of the German locational surname Odenkirchen or from the Dutch locational surname Oudekerk which literally means “old church”. Notable people with the surname include:

- Bill Odenkirk (born 1965), American comedy writer
- Bob Odenkirk (born 1962), American actor, comedian, writer, director and producer
