= Mönchengladbach–Stolberg railway =

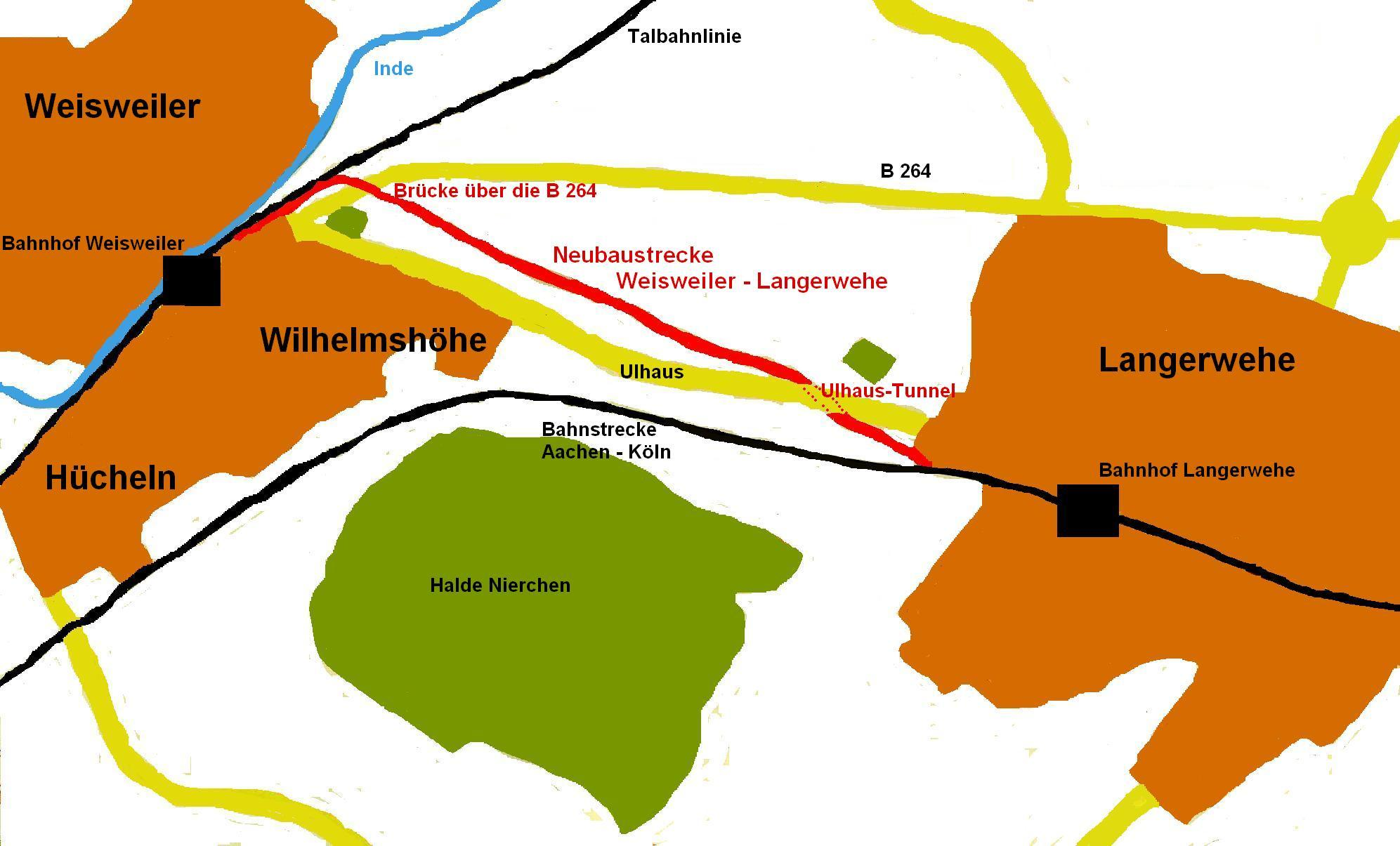
- Eschweiler-Weisweiler–Langerwehe connecting line

Overview
- Line number: 2521 (Mönchengladbach–Hochneukirch); 2571 (Hochneukirch–Stolberg); 9307 (Weisweiler–Langerwehe)
- Locale: North Rhine-Westphalia, Germany

Service
- Route number: 482

Technical
- Line length: 57.7 km (35.9 mi)
- Number of tracks: 2: Odenkirchen–Hochneukirch
- Track gauge: 1,435 mm (4 ft 8 1/2 in) standard gauge

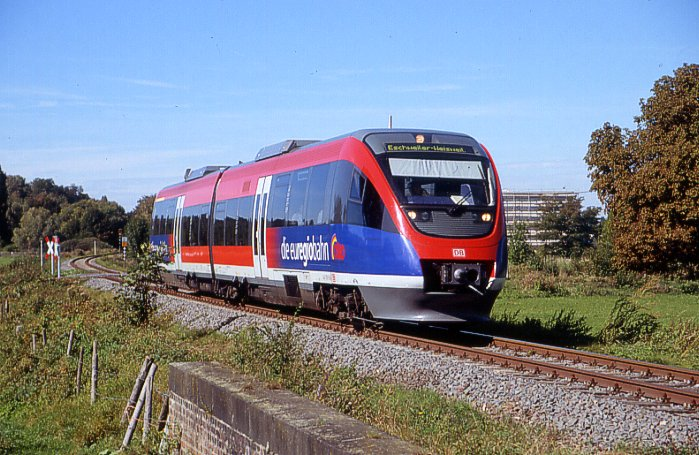
Euregiobahn in Eschweiler-Nothberg

The Mönchengladbach–Stolberg railway was opened by the Bergisch-Märkische Railway Company (German: Bergisch-Märkische Eisenbahn-Gesellschaft, BME) and built in sections between 1870 and 1875.

The only scheduled traffic on it now are passenger services operated as part of the Euregiobahn concept (which is aimed at improving regional rail passenger services in Aachen and southern Limburg) and freight operation to railway sidings on the southern part of the line, known as the Eschweiler Valley Railway (Eschweiler Talbahn) or Inde Valley Railway (Indetalbahn), as well as regional trains operated between Mönchengladbach Hauptbahnhof and Cologne on the short section of the line between Rheydt-Odenkirchen and Hochneukirch, which is now considered to be part of the Cologne–Mönchengladbach line. Occasional freight trains run between Mönchengladbach Hauptbahnhof and Rheydt-Geneicken. The northern sections of the line from Hochneukirch to Frenz and from Rheydt-Geneicken to Rheydt-Odenkirchen are shut down and largely dismantled.

== History ==
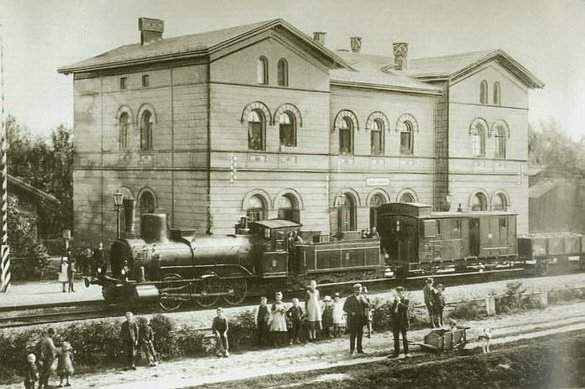
Odenkirchen station in 1874

On 1 February 1870 the Bergisch-Märkische Railway Company opened the first part of the line between Mönchengladbach and Odenkirchen.

The concession for the construction and operation of the extension of the line to Hochneukirch, Jülich, Inden and Weisweiler to Eschweiler-Aue, with a total length of 48.77 km, was granted to the BME on 23 September 1870. This section was put into operation three years later on 1 October 1873.

Another section to Stolberg followed in 1875. Stolberg BME station was located only a few hundred metres south of the Stolberg RhE station on the Cologne–Aachen line, built by the Rhenish Railway Company (Rheinische Eisenbahn-Gesellschaft, RhE). The station is now called Stolberg (Rheinland) Hauptbahnhof.

At the end of that year, a connection line to was built to the Stolberg AIE station of the Aachen Industrial Railway (Aachener Industriebahn AG) was put into operation, but soon after the nationalisation of the (nominally) private Prussian railway companies at the end of the 19th century, it was closed.

When the line between Mönchengladbach and Stolberg was nationalised, it came under the Royal Railway Division at Cologne of the East bank of the Rhine (Königlichen Eisenbahndirection zu Cöln rechtsrheinisch) from 1 April 1883, like the other railway lines in the region (despite being west of the Rhine), which then integrated the individual lines. The connecting line that was still located in area of Stolberg RHE station was connected to Eschweiler-Aue on 15 October 1884.

The Prussian state railways, introduced the first direct passenger trains from Stolberg to Mönchengladbach. In 1920 the company became part of the Deutsche Reichsbahn.

=== Post-war period ===
After the turmoil of World War II, operations were resumed in the summer of 1945 and operations were taken over in 1949 by Deutsche Bundesbahn. In the 1950s a freight link was opened from Frenz station to Weisweiler power station. This eventually became the most important freight customer for the line.

Until the closure of the business in the early 1970s, brown coal briquettes were transported from Rheinbraun briquette factory in Weisweiler to Stolberg. This traffic was hauled by class 50 steam locomotives based in Stolberg depot until 1975.

From the 1950s steam-hauled passenger services were replaced by railbuses of classes VT 95 and VT 98. In recent years, passenger train services were operated with battery railcars of class 515.

=== Decline ===
During the rise of car ownership, passenger traffic fell sharply in the 1970s. Deutsche Bundesbahn operated its own buses and these increasingly diverted traffic from the railway on the route. Poor connections between the DB operated buses to the trains–especially at Hochneukirch station–further discouraged potential passengers, so that from 1976 buses gradually replaced railway services on the Hochneukirch–Jülich section during the evening hours, after midday on Saturdays and on Sundays. Anyway, the whole line was threatened in the medium term by its impending interruption by the expansions of two open-cut mines at Inden and Garzweiler.

So on 1 June 1980, passenger services were closed between Hochneukirch and Jülich and freight traffic was closed between Ameln and Jülich on 15 July 1980. Freight traffic was closed between Ameln and Hochneukirch on 1 June 1984.

On 31 May 1981, the stations of Eschweiler-Röhe and Eschweiler-Aue were closed. On 22 May 1983, the remaining section of the Valley Railway was closed for all passenger traffic. At the same time freight operations were closed between Frenz and Julich.

The connection between Rheydt-Odenkirchen and Rheydt Hauptbahnhof opened in 1908 meant that the two-track line via Geneicken opened in 1870 became secondary to the line between Mönchengladbach Hauptbahnhof and Rheydt station. This section, which was also used by trains between Mönchengladbach and Cologne and was still electrified in 1968, was finally closed in May 1985 and dismantled between Odenkirchen and Geneicken. The former stations on this section are now served by buses of the Niederrheinische Versorgung und Verkehr (Lower Rhine Supply and Transport). A hiking trail was built on part of the route. The Geneicken station building was bought in 1988 by the city of Mönchengladbach and now houses a restaurant and community space.

== Current operation ==
The line is currently used for freight trains serving the Weisweiler power station. In addition, travel between Mönchengladbach Central Station and Rheydt-Geneicken is used by occasional freight trains running to the railway siding of the Areva-Schorch company in Geneicken station, carrying heavy transformers. The Rheydt-Ordenkirchen–Hochneukirch section is still regularly used by freight and regional trains between Cologne and Mönchengladbach.

At the initiative of the Aachener Verkehrsverbund (Aachen Transport Association), on 11 September 2004 passenger services were reintroduced on the Stolberg (Rheinl) Hbf–Eschweiler-Weisweiler section of the line to create a better link between the inner cities of Aachen, Eschweiler and Stolberg, the three largest cities in the urban area.

=== Eschweiler-Weisweiler Langerwehe line ===
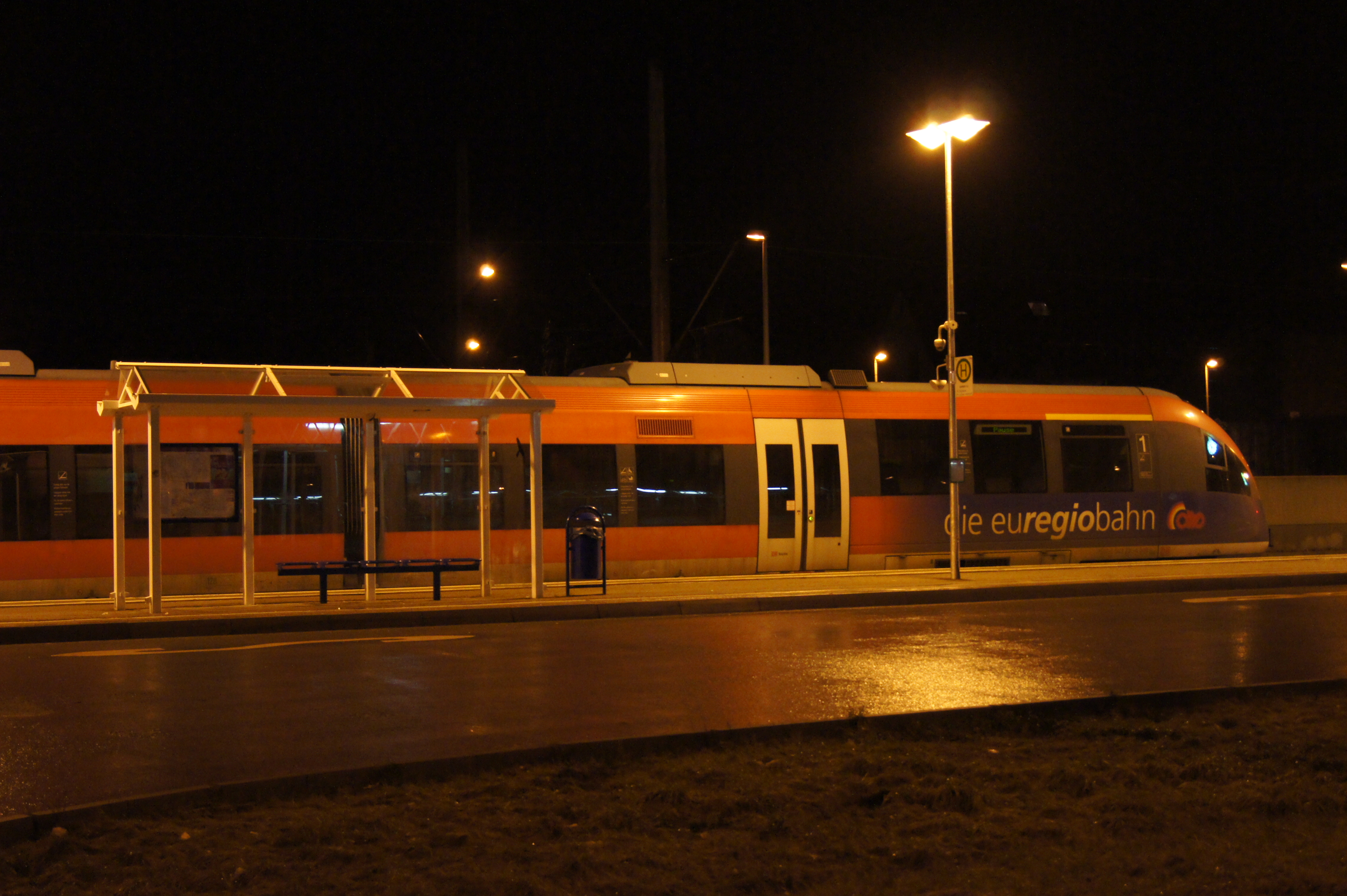
euregiobahn platform in Langerwehe

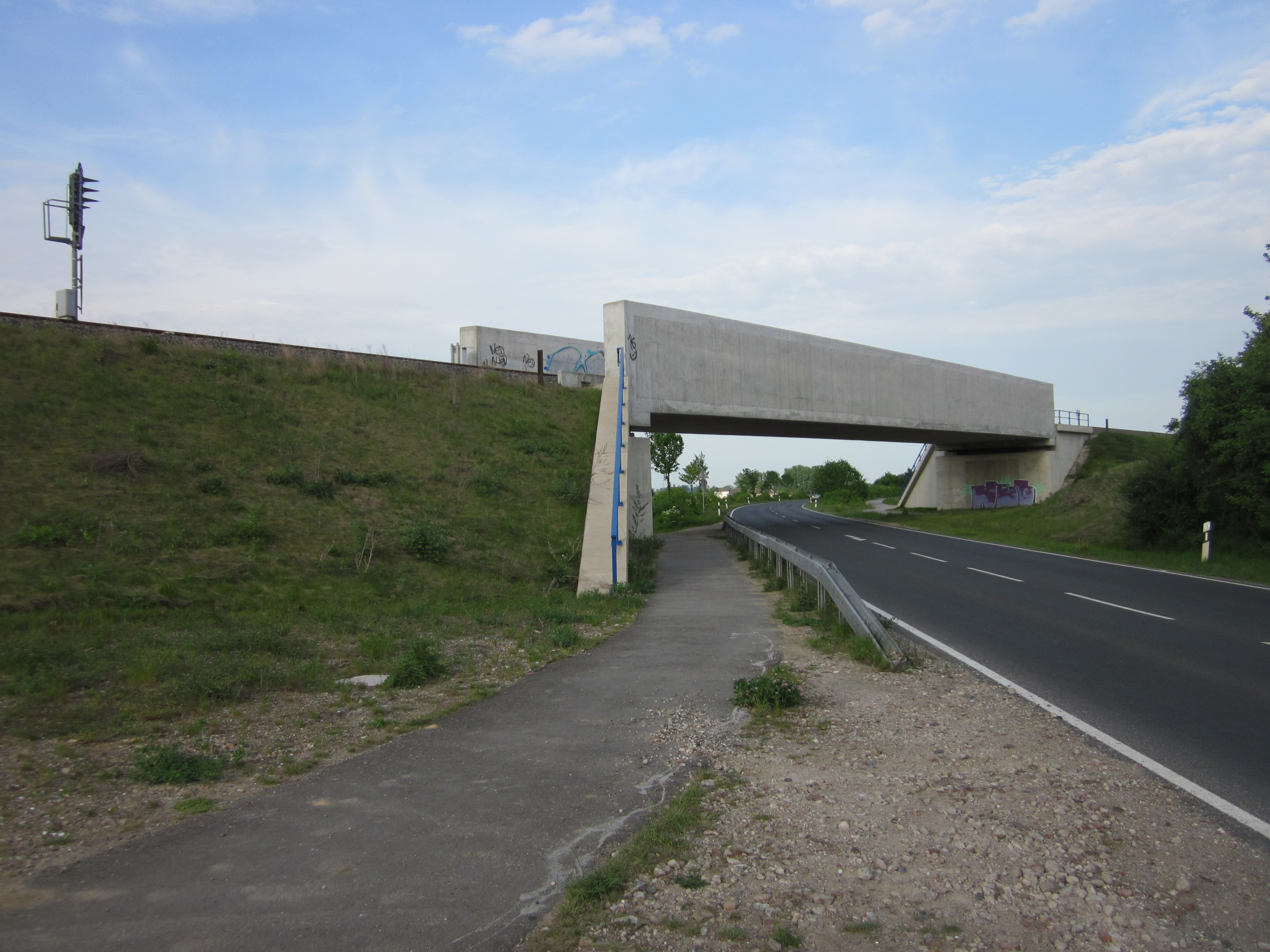
Rail bridge over B 264 looking towards Langerwehe

The Eschweiler-Weisweiler Langerwehe line is a 2.4 km long rail link, in the Eschweiler district of Weisweiler, connecting Eschweiler-Weisweiler station and Langerwehe station in the neighbouring community of Langerwehe. The line is maintained by EUREGIO Verkehrsschienennetz and services are operated by Euregiobahn.

The Eschweiler-Weisweiler–Langerwehe was planned and built as a new line with the intention of extending Euregio services beyond Langerwehe to create a connection at Düren with the Julich-Heimbach railway (also known as the Rur Valley Railway, Rurtalbahn). The construction period lasted from June 2007 to June 2009 and the total cost amounted to approximately €18 million.

For this purpose, a new line was built that included a single-track overpass over federal highway 264 and the single-track, 285 m long Ulhaus tunnel under the Langerwehe arterial road, which ends immediately before Langerwehe station. Its official opening was on 10 June 2009 and operations started on 14 June 2009.

Associated with the building of the new line, a second track was restored at Eschweiler-Weisweiler to allow trains to cross at the station.

On 14 June 2009, Euregiobahn services commenced from Eschweiler Tal station to Langerwehe, continuing hourly to Düren from December 2009.
