= Ansgar Heveling =

German politician

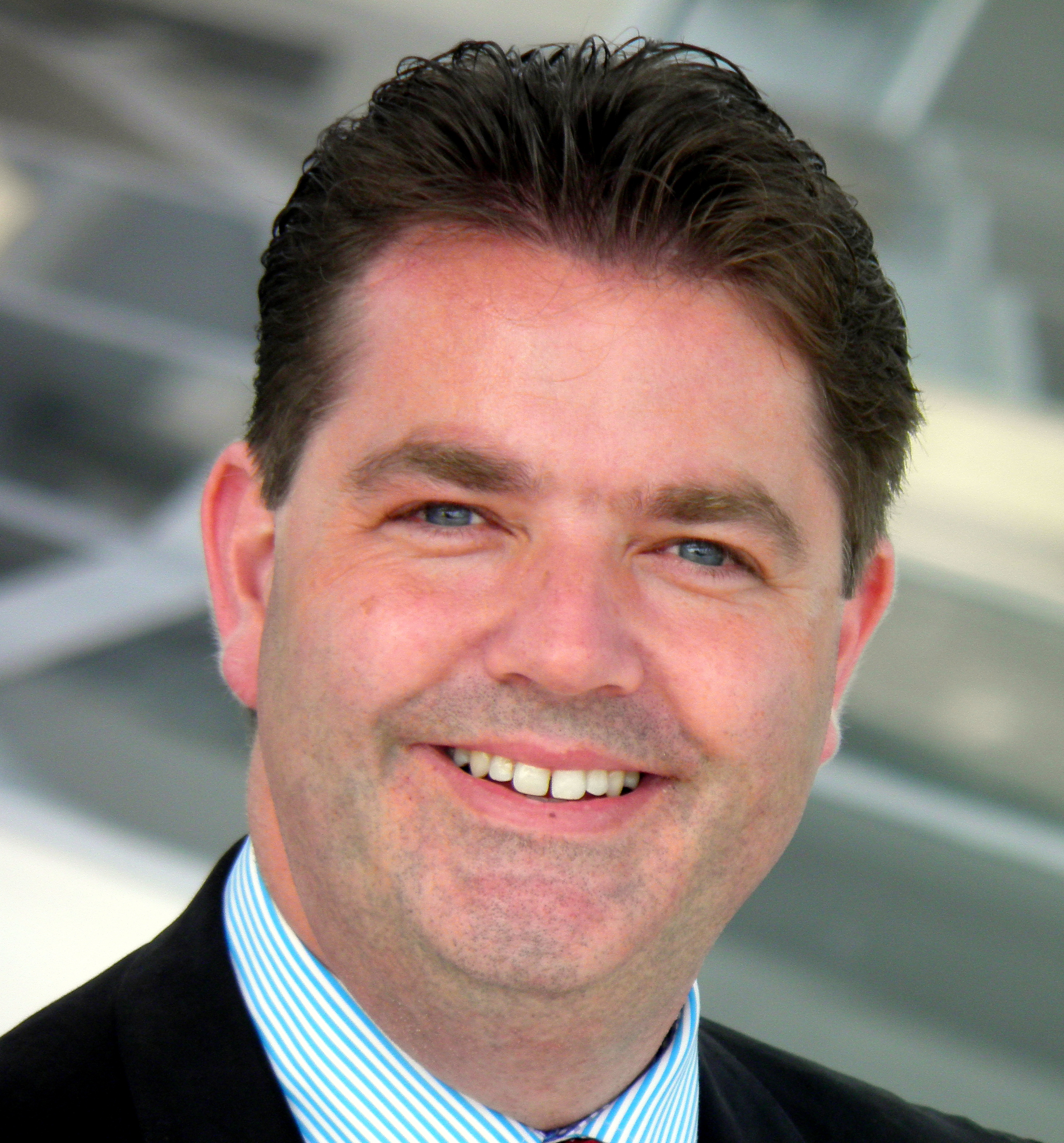
- Heveling in 2012

Member of the Bundestag
- In office 2009–2026

Personal details
- Born: Ansgar Guido Karl Johannes Heveling; 3 July 1972 (age 54) Rheydt, West Germany (now Germany)
- Party: CDU
- Children: 1
- Education: University of Bonn; German University of Administrative Sciences, Speyer

Ansgar Guido Karl Johannes Heveling (born 3 July 1972) is a German lawyer and politician of the Christian Democratic Union (CDU) who has been serving as president of the Federal Court of Audit since 2026.

From 2009 to 2026, Heveling served as a member of the Bundestag, representing the Krefeld I – Neuss II district.

== Early career ==
From 2005 until 2009, Heveling served as deputy chief of staff to North Rhine-Westphalia's State Minister of Finance Helmut Linssen (CDU) in the government of Minister-President Jürgen Rüttgers (CDU, Kabinett Rüttgers).

== Political career ==
Heveling first became a member of the Bundestag in the 2009 German federal election, representing Krefeld. He ran for the Bundestag federal elections in 2009, 2013, 2017, 2021 and 2025 and was elected every time in his constituency (de) near Neuss (North Rhine-Westphalia).

In parliament, Heveling was a member of the Committee on Legal Affairs and Consumer Protection; the Committee on the Scrutiny of Elections, Immunity and the Rules of Procedure; and the Committee on the Election of Judges (Wahlausschuss), which is in charge of appointing judges to the Federal Constitutional Court of Germany. From 2009 until 2013, he was also a member of the Subcommittee on European Affairs. He serves as his parliamentary group's rapporteur on copyright and criminal law.

In the negotiations to form a Grand Coalition of the Christian Democrats (CDU together with the Bavarian CSU) and the SPD following the 2013 federal elections, Heveling was part of the CDU/CSU delegation in the working group on cultural and media affairs, led by Michael Kretschmer and Klaus Wowereit.

From 2018, Heveling was part of a cross-party working group on a reform of Germany’s electoral system, chaired by Wolfgang Schäuble. In 2022, he was a member of the Commission for the Reform of the Electoral Law and the Modernization of Parliamentary Work, co-chaired by Johannes Fechner and Nina Warken.

Heveling was Chairman of the Internal Affairs Committee of the 18th German Bundestag (2015-2017). He served as representative of the CDU/CSU parliamentary group in the Culture Committee. In addition, he was part of the Enquete Commission on the Internet and Digital Society and was a member of the Legal Affairs Committee of the German Bundestag. In 2018, Heveling became legal advisor to the CDU/CSU parliamentary group.

In the 20th German Bundestag, Heveling was a full member of the Election Committee, the Election Review Committee, the Legal Affairs Committee and the Committee for Election Review, Immunity and Rules of Procedure. He also was a deputy member of the Committee for Culture and Media.

Heveling is a member of the non-partisan Europa-Union Deutschland, which advocates for a federal Europe and the European unification process.

== Political positions ==
Heveling was one of 226 Members of the Bundestag who voted in June 2017 against the introduction of same-sex marriage in Germany.

== See also ==
- List of members of the 17th Bundestag
- List of members of the 18th Bundestag
- List of members of the 19th Bundestag
- List of members of the 20th Bundestag
- List of members of the 21st Bundestag
