= Otto Fricke =

German lawyer and politician (born 1965)

- Fricke in 2017

Member of the Bundestag
- In office 2017–2025
- In office 2002–2013

Personal details
- Born: 21 November 1965 (age 60) Krefeld, North Rhine-Westphalia, West Germany
- Party: FDP
- Education: University of Freiburg
- Occupation: Lawyer

Otto Fricke (born 21 November 1965 in Krefeld, North Rhine-Westphalia) is a German lawyer and politician of the Free Democratic Party (FDP) who served as a member of the Bundestag from 2002 to 2013 and again from 2017 to 2025.

== Early life and education ==
After graduating from high school in 1985 at the Gymnasium Fabritianum in Krefeld-Uerdingen, Fricke completed his military service in the German Air Force from 1985 to 1986. From 1986 to 1992 he studied law at the University of Freiburg. After his legal clerkship, he passed his second state examination in law in Düsseldorf in 1995. He was admitted to the bar in 1995.

From 1996 to 2002, Fricke worked as parliamentary advisor for legal policy and parliamentary law for the FDP parliamentary group in the Bundestag.

== Political career ==
Fricke has been a member of the FDP since 1989. From 2002 to 2013 he was a member of the German Bundestag, into which he always entered via the North Rhine-Westphalia state list. In the Bundestag he was chairman of the Budget Committee from 2005 to 2009. On 26 October 2009, Fricke was elected by the FDP parliamentary group in the Bundestag as one of four parliamentary managing directors. Due to his party's failure to reach the five-percent hurdle in the 2013 federal election, he lost his seat in the Bundestag.

In the 2017 Bundestag elections, Fricke ran for election in the Bundestag constituency 110 (Krefeld I – Neuss II) and entered the Bundestag via the North Rhine-Westphalia state list (list position 7). In parliament, he served on the Budget Committee again. He was also an alternate member of the Committee on the Election of Judges (Wahlausschuss), which is in charge of appointing judges to the Federal Constitutional Court of Germany.

In the negotiations to form a so-called traffic light coalition of the Social Democrats (SPD), the Green Party and the FDP following the 2021 federal elections, Fricke led his party's delegation in the working group on cultural affairs and media; his co-chairs from the other parties were Carsten Brosda and Claudia Roth.

== Other activities ==
- Leo Baeck Foundation, Member of the Board of Trustees
- Otto Benecke Foundation, Member of the Board of Trustees
- World Vision Deutschland, Member of the Board of Trustees

== Political positions ==
Along with Karl Lauterbach, Swen Schulz, Katrin Helling-Plahr and Petra Sitte, Fricke was one of the authors of a cross-party initiative in 2021 to liberalize the legal framework for assisted suicide in Germany.
