= Jüchen =

- Municipality
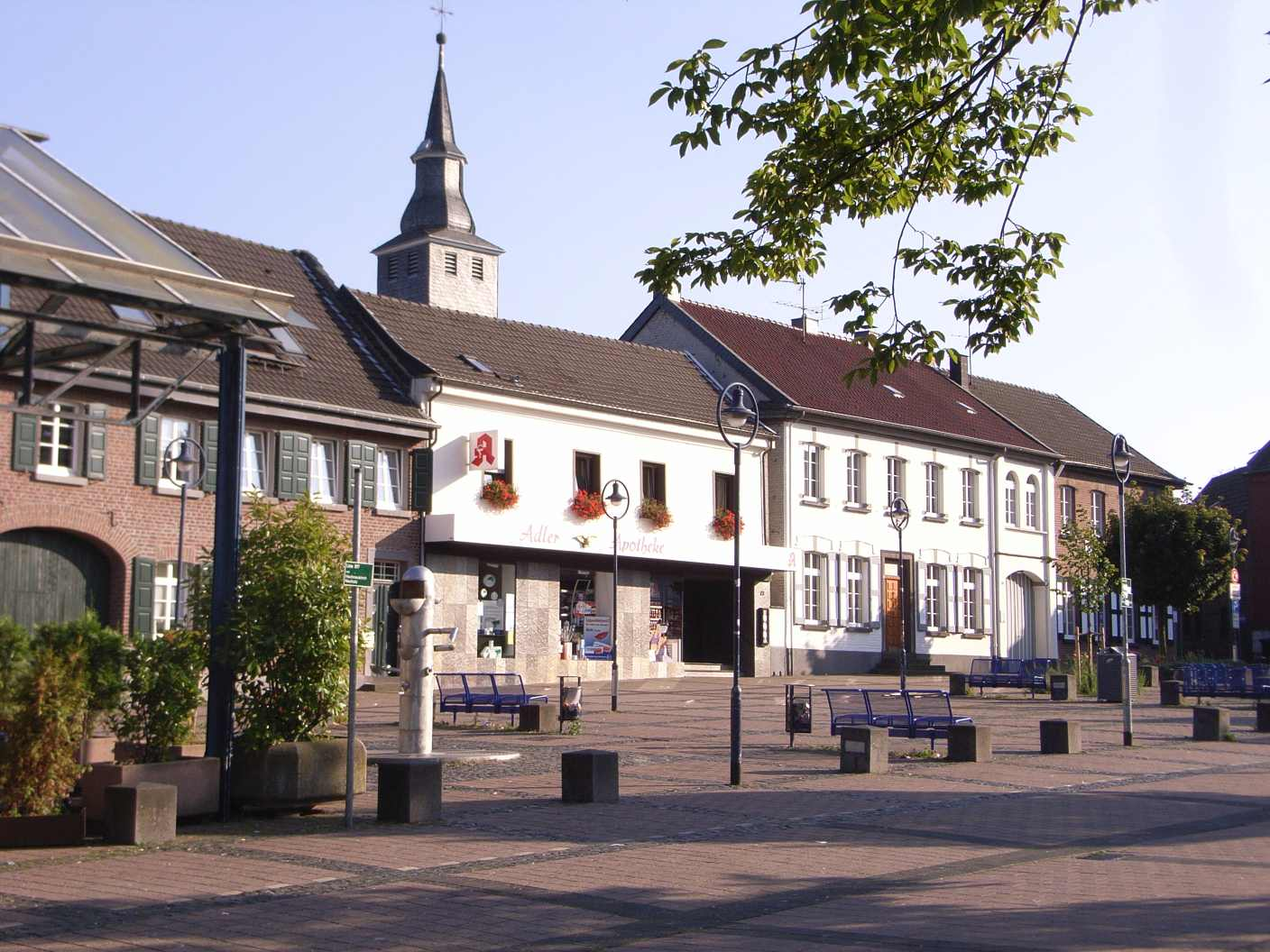
- Town square

- Coat of arms

- Location of Jüchen within Neuss district
- Interactive map of Jüchen
- Location within Germany Location within North Rhine-Westphalia
- Coordinates: 51°06′04″N 06°30′06″E
- Country: Germany
- State: North Rhine-Westphalia
- Admin. region: Düsseldorf
- District: Neuss
- Subdivisions: 30

Government
  - Mayor (2020–25): Harald Zillikens (CDU)

Area
  - Total: 71.87 km^{2} (27.75 sq mi)
- Elevation: 81 m (266 ft)

Population (2025-12-31)
  - Total: 23,901
  - Density: 332.6/km^{2} (861.3/sq mi)
- Time zone: UTC+01:00 (CET)
  - Summer (DST): UTC+02:00 (CEST)
- Postal codes: 41363
- Dialling codes: 02164, 02165, 02166, 02181, 02182
- Vehicle registration: NE
- Website: www.juechen.de

Jüchen (German pronunciation: [ˈjʏçn̩]) is a municipality in the Rhein-Kreis Neuss, in North Rhine-Westphalia, Germany.

The municipality of Jüchen consists of 17 villages and several hamlets. The most important villages are Jüchen itself (6600 inhabitants) and Hochneukirch (5400 inhabitants) in the west. Other villages among others are Gierath, Bedburdyk, Otzenrath, Garzweiler, Holz and Aldenhoven.

Jüchen is located between the towns of Rheydt (to the north-east, 9 km away) and Grevenbroich (to the south-west, 8 km away). The state capital Düsseldorf is 28 km away.

The municipality is located on the A61 and A46 motorways. There are two railway stations (Jüchen and Hochneukirch) on the Mönchengladbach-Cologne line.

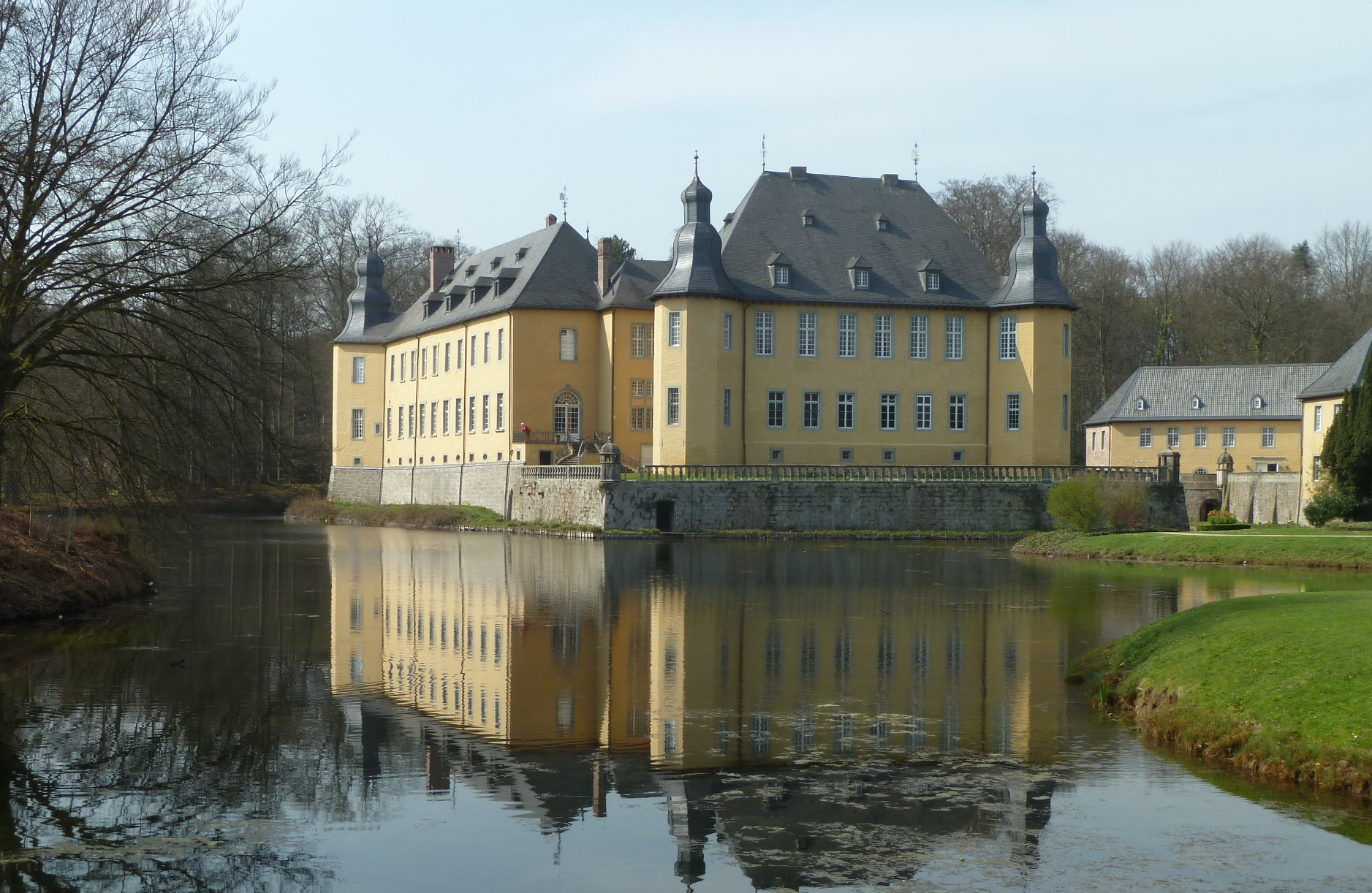
Schloss Dyck

The Garzweiler surface mine is located to the south of Jüchen. Brown coal is mined above ground there. The European distribution centre of 3M is located on the A46.

In the north of the municipality is the moated castle of Dyck, with a park that is over 200 years old.

== Population ==
Historical population

Year	Pop.	±% p.a.
1965	18,733	—
1970	19,666	+0.98%
1975	20,285	+0.62%
1980	20,883	+0.58%
1985	20,539	−0.33%
1990	21,007	+0.45%
1995	22,216	+1.13%

Year	Pop.	±% p.a.
2000	22,710	+0.44%
2005	22,793	+0.07%
2010	22,648	−0.13%
2015	23,260	+0.53%
2020	23,516	+0.22%
2025	23,901	+0.33%

Source: Landesdatabank Nordrhein-Westfalen

== Mayor ==
Harald Zillikens (born 1959) (CDU) was elected mayor in 2009 and reelected in 2015 and 2020. He was the successor of Margarete Kranz (CDU).

== Twin towns – sister cities ==
Jüchen is twinned with:

- Leers, France

== Notable people ==
- Peter Bamm, actually Curt Emmrich, (1897–1975), writer
- Willibert Kremer (born 1939), football player and manager
- Annette Schavan (born 1955), politician (CDU), 2005-2013 Federal Minister for Education and Research
- Willy Wimmer (born 1943), politician (CDU)
