= Giesenkirchen =

District in Mönchengladbach, Germany

Coordinates: 51.158783°N 6.492233°E

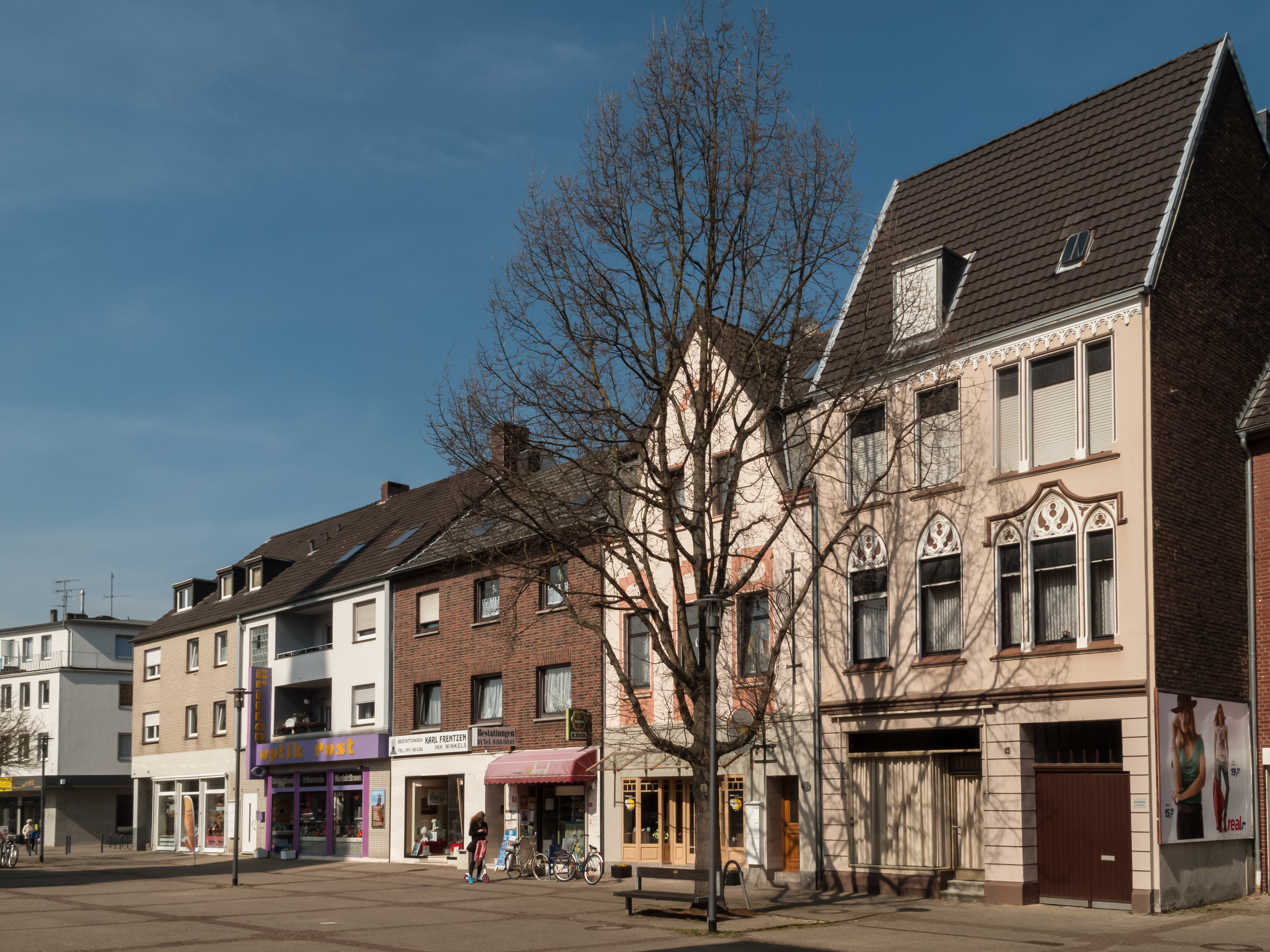
Giesenkirchen, view to a street: Konstantinplatz

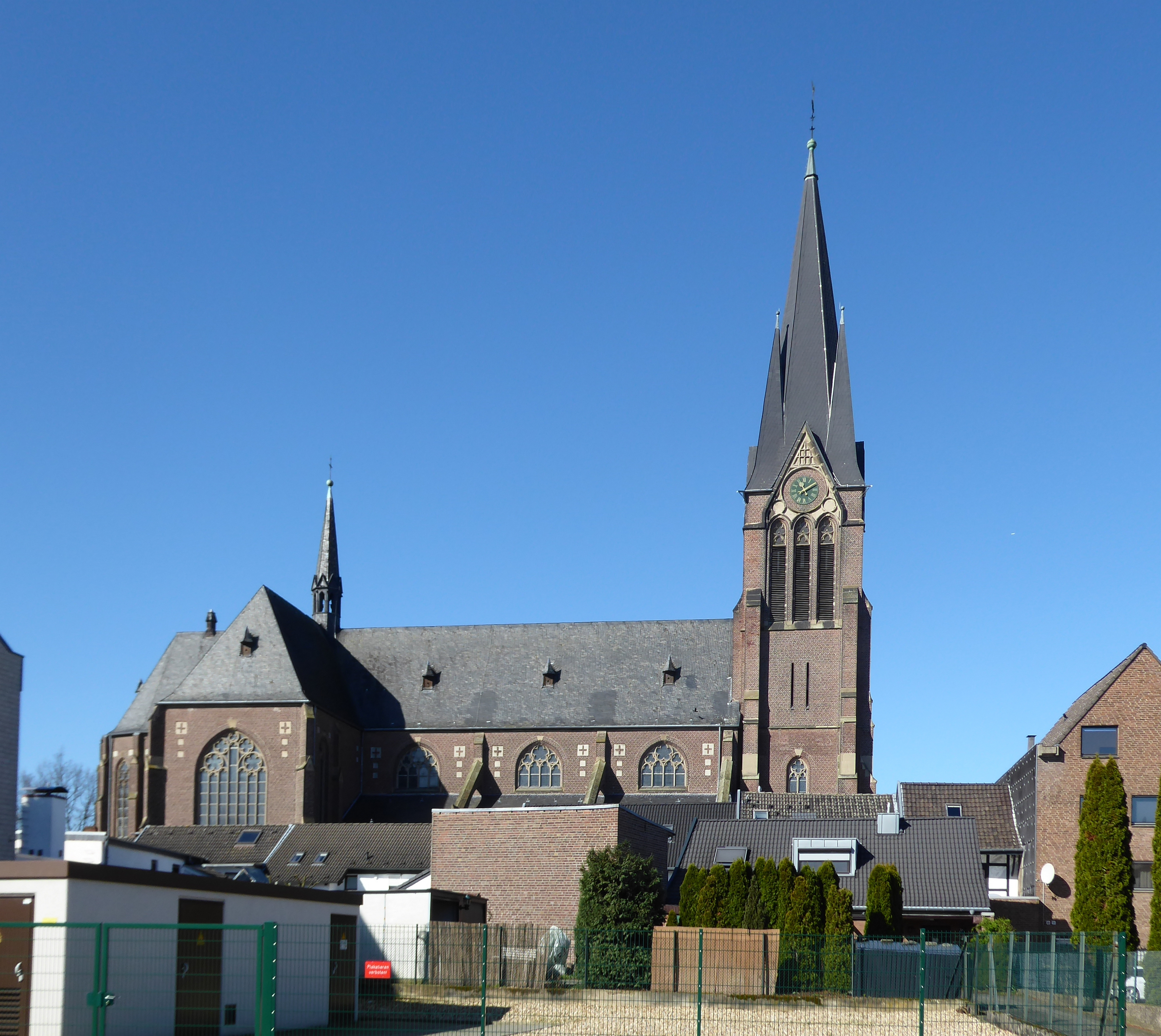
Giesenkirchen, St Gereon's Church

Giesenkirchen is a district in the city of Mönchengladbach in the eastern part of the Lower Rhine region, Germany. Up to 22 October 2009 it was a separate borough of Mönchengladbach. Previously it had been part of Rheydt, which was suburbanized with Mönchengladbach in 1975. On 30 June 2007, Giesenkirchen had 15,853 inhabitants. Of these, 9,130 lived in the district of Giesenkirchen-Mitte, 4,431 in Giesenkirchen-Nord and 2,292 in Schelsen.

== History ==
The name Giesenkirchen was first recorded in 1150, in a deed now held in the historical archives of Cologne. This deed mentions the donation of a newly cleared plot of land, the so-called Neubruchzehnt, made by the provost of St. Gereon in Cologne. The land was gifted to the church of Giesenkirchen under the condition that future small repairs to the roof and sacristy of the church would be paid for by the parishioners.

Until the start of the French occupation in October 1794, Giesenkirchen belonged to the Electorate of Cologne. Under French rule, the territorial boundaries were abolished.

== Politics ==
In the election for District Council in September 2004, the CDUreached 43.3% (6 seats), the SPD 25.4% (3 seats), the Free Democratic Party (FDP) 4.7% (1 seat), The Greens 8.3% (1 seat) and the FWG 16.1% (2 seats) of the votes. For District Frank Boss (CDU) was elected.

As of 2009 the Council Members were Giesenkirchen North: Horst-Peter Vennen (SPD), Giesenkirchen-South: Ralf Kremer (CDU). From 2004 to 2009, the CDU in Giesenkirchen lost over 50% of their votes.

In 2000, Hans-Willi Körfges (SPD), a native of Giesenkirchen, became a member of the Landtag of North Rhine-Westphalia.

== Schools ==
The first school was a Catholic parish school whose origin is unknown. It is documented that in 1571 "uff Remigii" became the master. In 1809 on the south side of the church, the congregation built a school building with a classroom. With the introduction of compulsory education in 1825 a second classroom was added.

On 19 October 1868 the school was inaugurated as Meerkamp and approved for teaching. An extension was created in 1898. The school reached its final form with the construction of a new building with four classrooms, teaching materials and teachers' lounge room in 1912.

For the Protestant students from Schelsen, in 1846 a private school was opened. The cost was covered by voluntary contributions and a grant from Gustav-Adolf-Verein. Because of the low number of students it was dissolved in 1945.

A public Protestant elementary school began in 1947 in the building of the Catholic elementary school. In 1959 they moved into a free-standing building on Fries Road. A new school building was for the Protestant Elementary School in the years 1965/1966, prepared by the city at Rheydt Asternweg. In 1968, the existing school system was divided into an elementary school and secondary school.

Giesenkirchen emerged at the beginning of 1968 as a Catholic primary school. A Protestant primary school was set up in the building Friesenstraße. At the beginning of the school year 1969/1970 the school was converted into a Primary School. Due to low student numbers, the Catholic elementary school at Bauerstraße was dissolved in 1969.
