= Willy Wimmer =

German politician

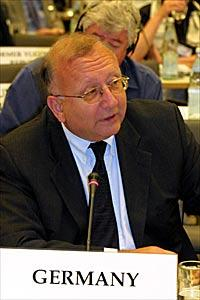

Vice President of the OSCE
- In office 1985–1992

Parliamentary State Secretary
- In office 1985–1992

Member of the Bundestag
- In office 1977–2009

Member of Mönchengladbach City Council
- In office 1969–1980

Personal details
- Born: May 18, 1943 (age 82) Mönchengladbach, Germany
- Party: Christian Democratic Union of Germany

Willy Wimmer (born 18 May 1943) is a German politician belonging to the Christian Democratic Union of Germany (CDU). He was a member of the Bundestag from 1976 to 2009.

== Life and politics ==
Wimmer was born 1943 in the German town of Mönchengladbach and studied law at the University of Cologne.

Wimmer entered the CDU in 1959 and served on the city council in his home town Mönchengladbach from 1969 to 1980.

Wimmer was elected as a 'Direktkandidat' (direct candidate) to the Bundestag in 1977 for the first time.

From 1985 to 1992 Wimmer was 'Parlamentarischer Staatssekretär' (parliamentary state secretary), a parliament-elected bureaucratic post in the Ministry of Defence.

In 1994, Wimmer was elected vice president of the Organization for Security and Co-operation in Europe.
