= Cologne–Mönchengladbach railway =

Railway line in Germany

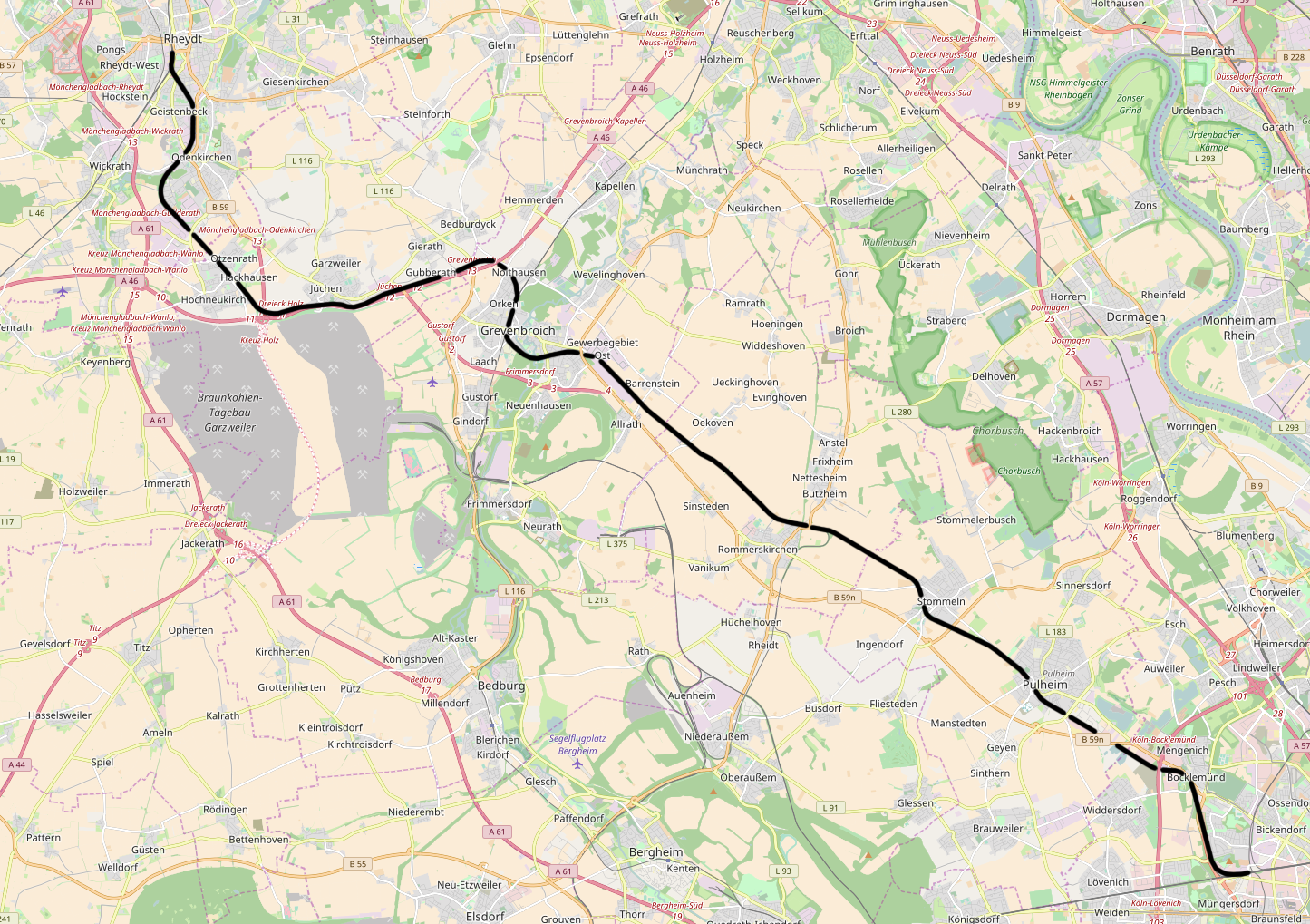

Overview
- Line number: 2611 (Rheydt–Cologne-Ehrenfeld Gbf); 2612 (Cologne-Ehrenfeld Westkopf); 2613 (Cologne-Ehrenfeld Gbf–Pbf)
- Locale: North Rhine-Westphalia, Germany
- Termini: Rheydt Hbf; Köln-Ehrenfeld

Service
- Route number: 465

Technical
- Line length: 49.4 km (30.7 mi)
- Track gauge: 1,435 mm (4 ft 8 1/2 in) standard gauge
- Electrification: 15 kV/16.7 Hz AC overhead catenary
- Operating speed: 120 km/h (74.6 mph) (maximum)

The Rheydt-Cologne railway is a mostly double-track electrified railway in the German state of North Rhine-Westphalia between Rheydt and Cologne-Ehrenfeld. Only the section between Rheydt Hauptbahnhof and Rheydt-Odenkirchen is single track.

== History ==
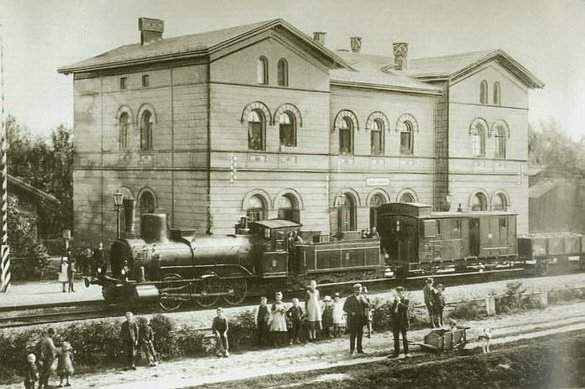
A steam train in Odenkirchen station in 1874

The first part of the line was built as part of the Mönchengladbach–Stolberg railway, which was built in stages between 1870 and 1875 by the Bergisch-Märkische Railway Company (German: Bergisch-Märkische Eisenbahn-Gesellschaft) from the current Mönchengladbach Hauptbahnhof (central station) via Geneicken, Mülfort, Odenkirchen and Hochneukirch and continuing to Jülich, Eschweiler and Stolberg. In 1889, a connection was built from Hochneukirch station, which was located on this line, to the Erft Railway near Grevenbroich station. The direct link from Grevenbroich to Köln-Ehrenfeld station was opened in 1899. The direct link between Odenkirchen and Rheydt Hauptbahnhof was finally opened in 1908. This meant that the 1870 line through Geneicken, which ran to Mönchengladbach Hauptbahnhof parallel with the line through Rheydt Hauptbahnhof and which had already been duplicated, was sidelined. This section of line, which was electrified in 1968, initially continued to be used for trains from Mönchengladbach to Cologne, but it was finally closed in May 1985 and dismantled between Odenkirchen and Geneicken.

== Operations ==
The line is served by Regional-Express service RE 8 (Rhein-Erft-Express), operating with class 425 electric multiple units, and Regionalbahn service RB 27 (Rhein-Erft-Bahn) operating with a class 143 electric locomotive and three double-deck coaches. Each service operates hourly.

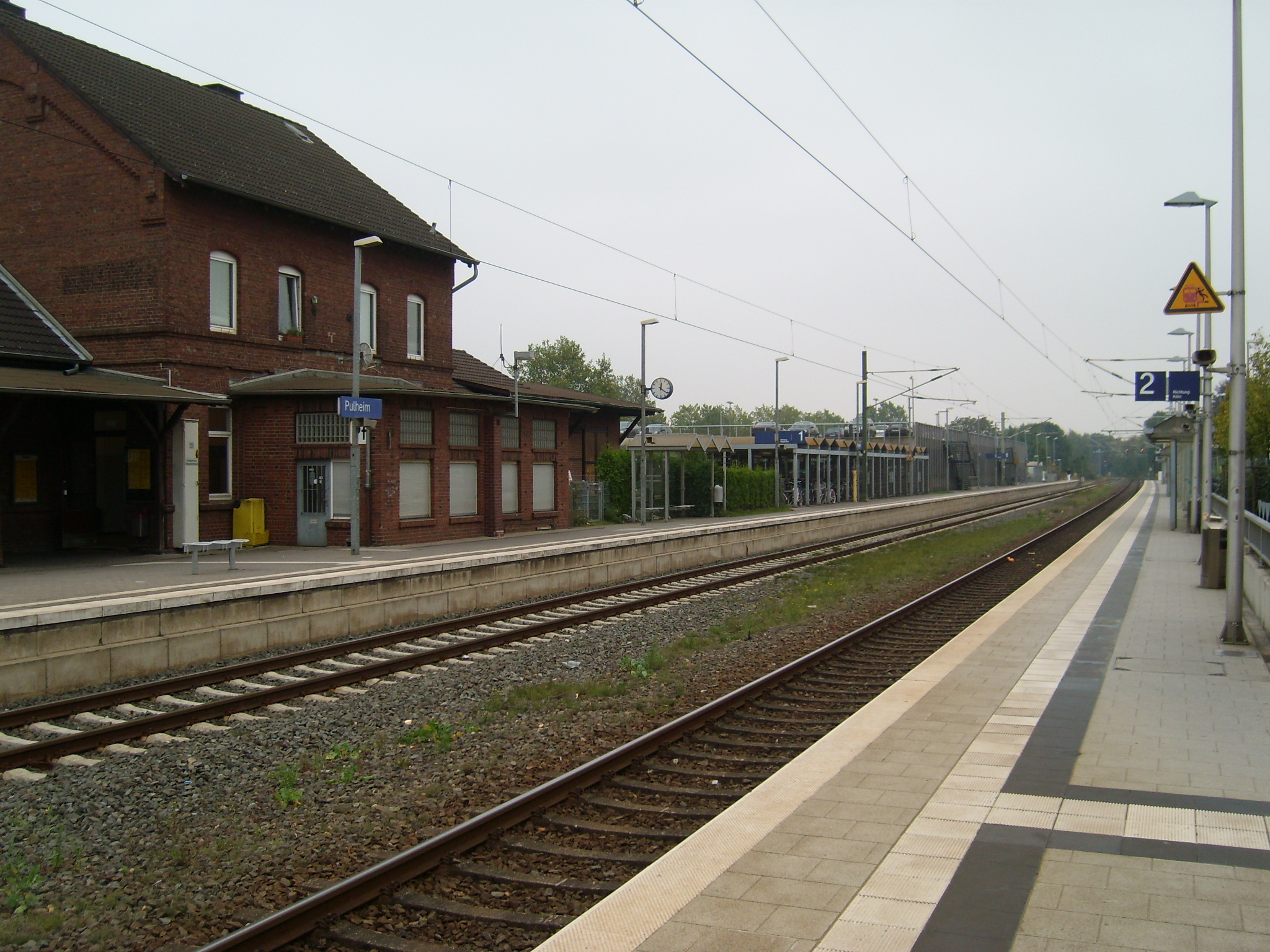
Pulheim

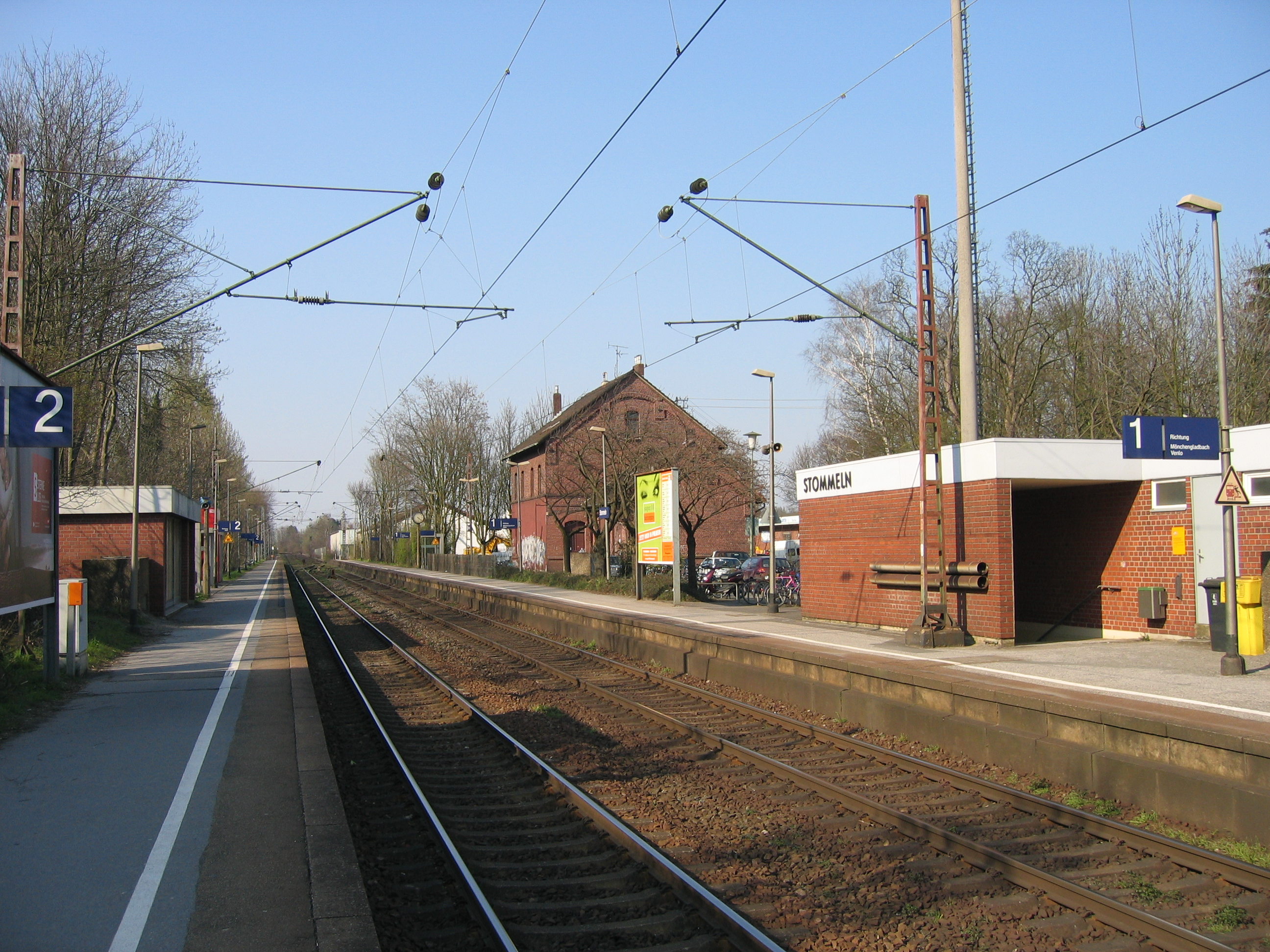
Stommeln

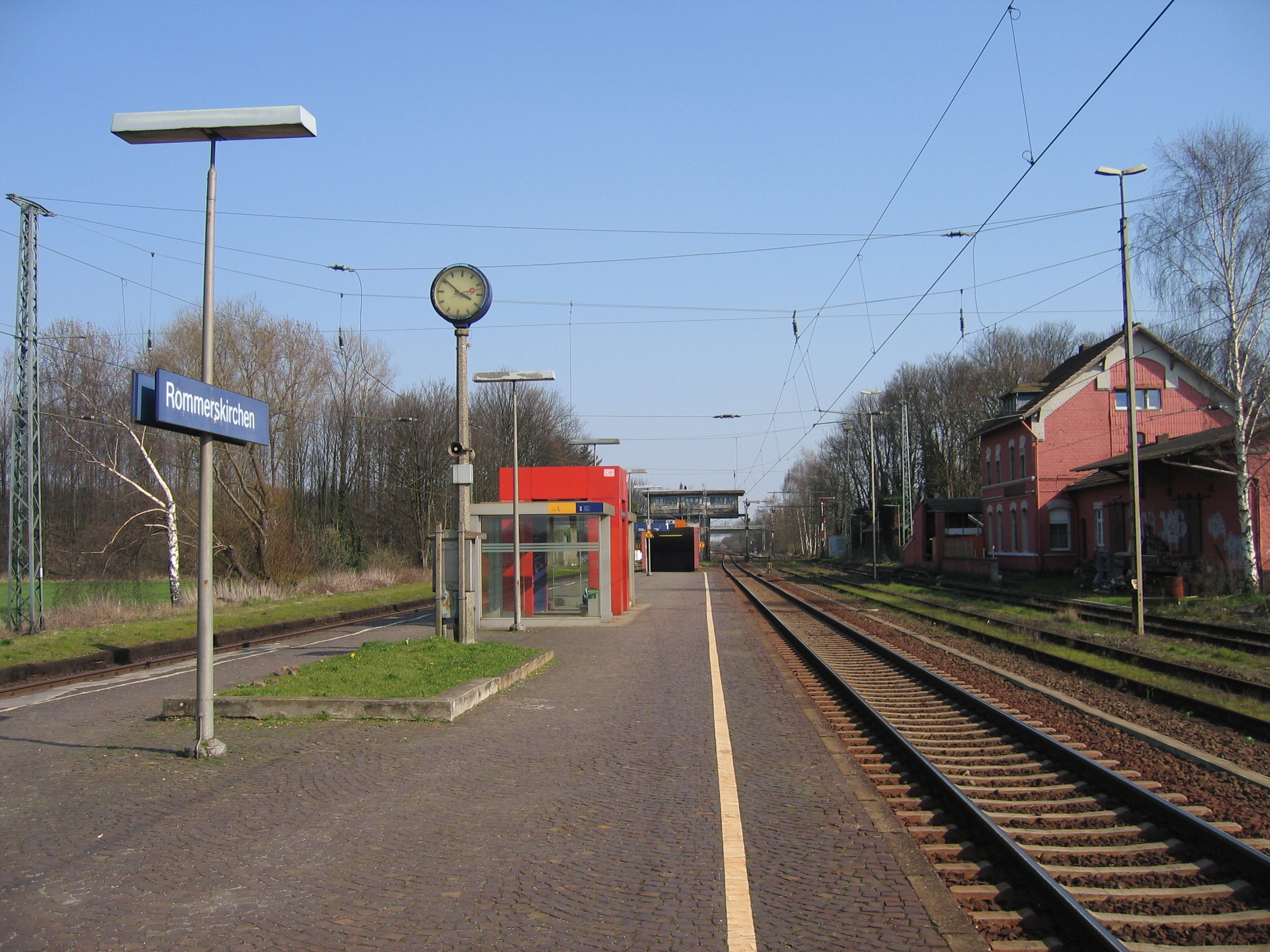
Rommerskirchen
