= Odenkirchen =

Part of Mönchengladbach, Germany

Coordinates: 51°07′N 6°27′E

Odenkirchen is a former town in Germany, presently part of the city Mönchengladbach. It is situated on the river Niers, 21 miles by rail south-west of Düsseldorf. It has a railway station (Rheydt-Odenkirchen), on the line from Mönchengladbach to Grevenbroich and Cologne. Pop. (2000) 19,993.

Odenkirchen castle was the seat of the lords of Odenkirchen from the 12th century. From 1794 to 1814, Odenkirchen was part of the French Roer département, from 1815 to 1918 part of the Kingdom of Prussia (Province of Jülich-Cleves-Berg, Rhine Province). It was given city rights in 1856. In 1929, it was incorporated into Gladbach-Rheydt, since 1975 part of Mönchengladbach. Odenkirchen remained a separate district within Mönchengladbach until 2009, when it was merged into the larger Mönchengladbach Süd city district.

The name Odenkirchen may derive from the Low German for either "wooden church" or "old church". Alternatively it may be from the given name Odo. or Odin/Oden. Odenkirchen was in use as a locational surname from at least the 18th century (anglicized as Odenkirk in the United States from the early 19th century) and as Odekerken in Dutch.
