= Hattenheim station =

Railway station in Eltville, Germany

Hattenheim
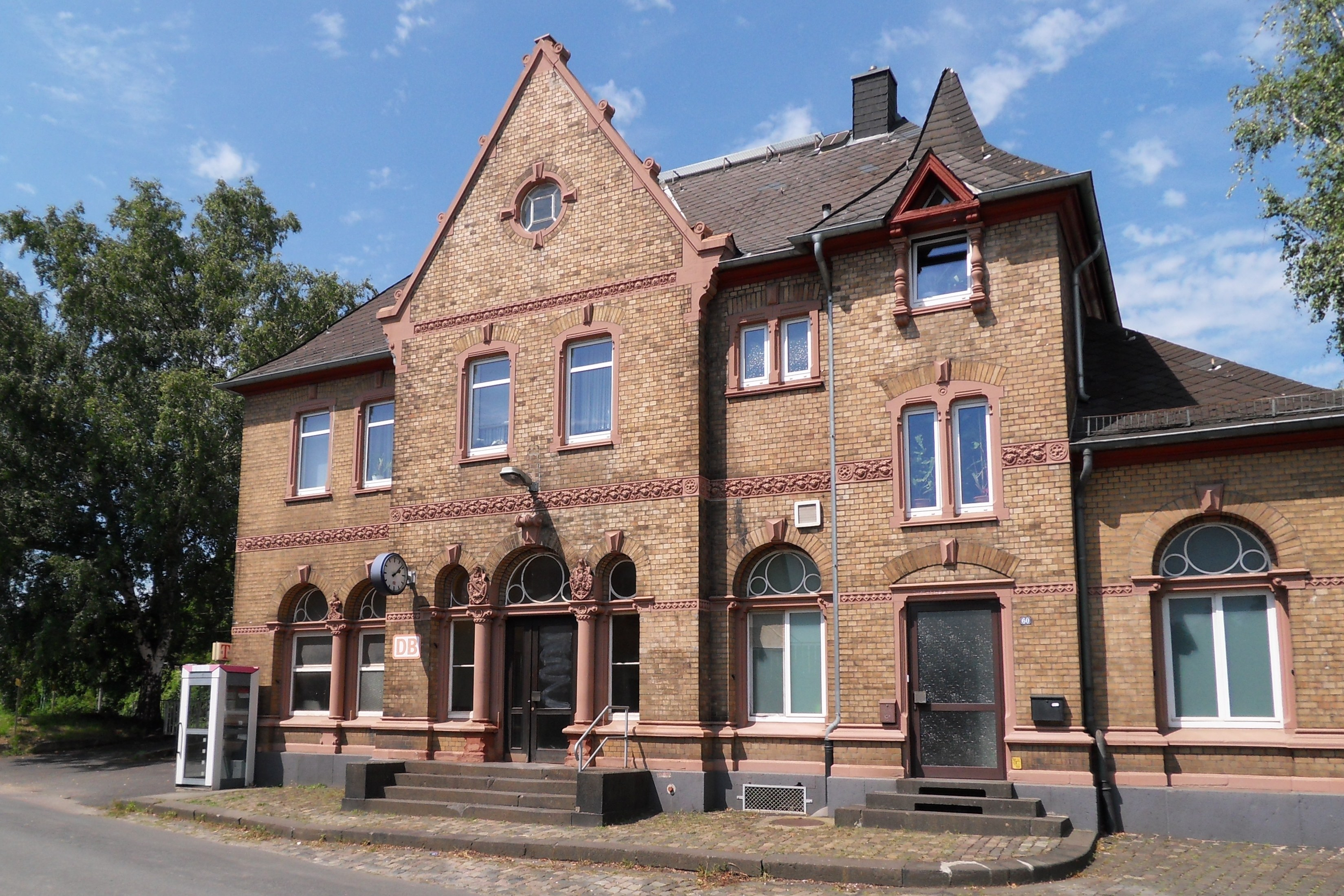
- Entrance building

General information
- Location: Hauptstr. 60, Hattenheim, Hesse; Germany
- Coordinates: 50°00′49″N 8°03′25″E
- Line: East Rhine Railway (km 53.89) (KBS 466)
- Platforms: 3

Construction
- Accessible: Yes
- Architect: Paul Rowald
- Architectural style: Gothic Revival and Renaissance Revival

Other information
- Station code: 2588
- DS100 code: FHAT
- IBNR: 8002635
- Category: 6
- Fare zone: : 6494
- Website: www.bahnhof.de

History
- Opened: 1885

Services
Preceding station	VIAS	Following station
Oestrich-Winkel towards Neuwied	RB 10	Erbach (Rheingau) towards Frankfurt (Main) Hbf
Location

Hattenheim is a station in the town of Hattenheim in the German state of Rhineland-Palatinate on the East Rhine Railway.

== History ==
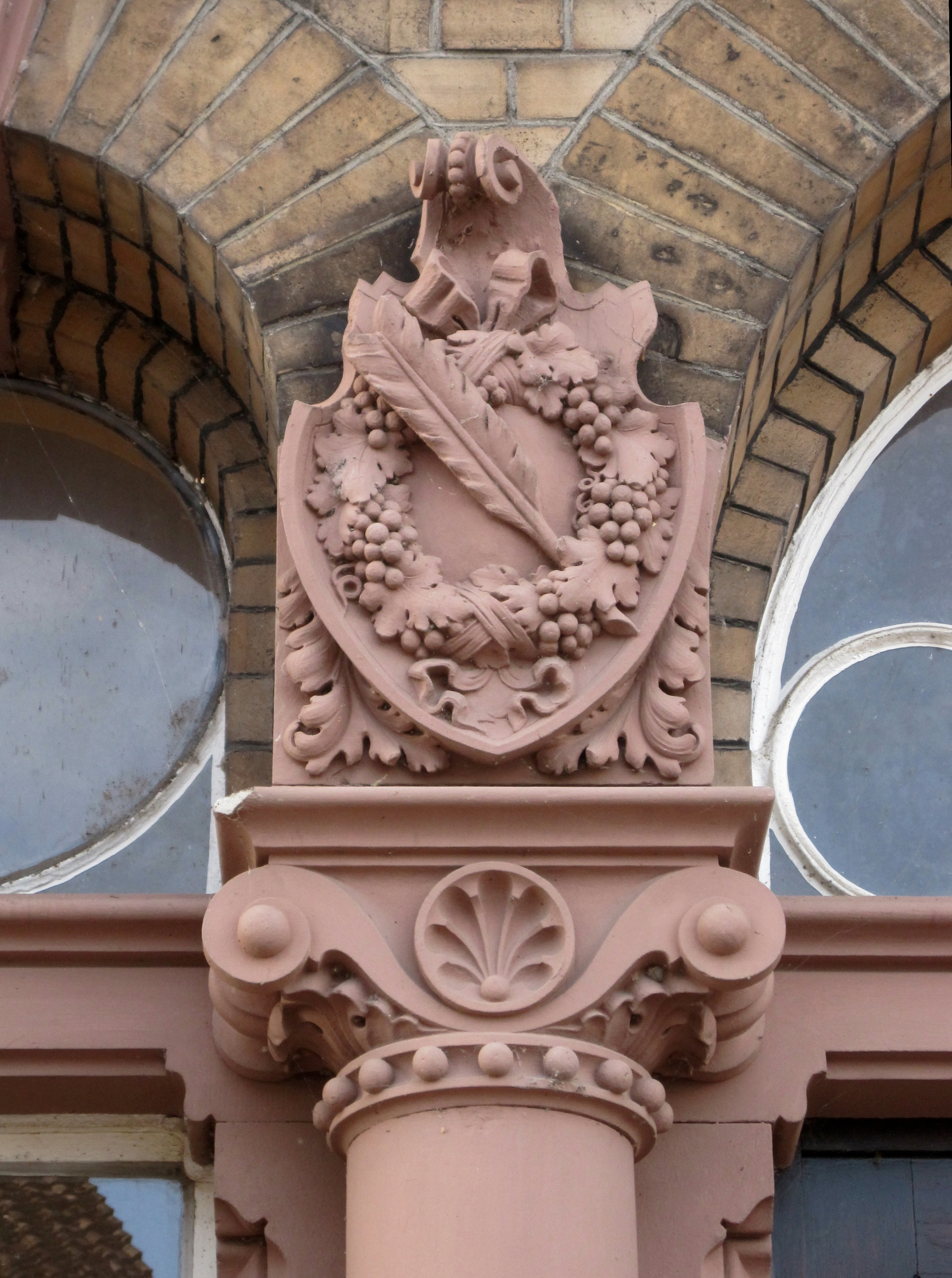
Hattenheim coat of arms

The Hattenheim station entrance building was built in 1884-85, replacing a building built for the Nassau Rhine Railway (Nassauische Rheinbahn), which was opened on 11 August 1856 from Wiesbaden to Rüdesheim and later extended to Oberlahnstein. The two-storey building was probably designed by the architect Paul Rowald. The building had a waiting room on the ground floor as well as various function rooms; on the second floor there was an apartment for the station master.

The almost symmetrical brickwork in the styles of Gothic Revival and Renaissance Revival consists of a protruding Avant-corps with a Rundbogenstil portal and an impost, which is flanked by two pillars. The end of the columns is formed by two sandstone coats of arms: one with the Prussian eagle, the other with the coat of arms of Hattenheim, but the martyr palm of the church patron Vincent of Saragossa is incorrectly represented as a feather. The arch windows of the ground floor have circular mullions and enclosing stones. A terracotta frieze with wine rack reliefs surrounds the whole building. An annex that was completed around 1900 extended the building to the east. Another entrance building of this type, probably also designed by Rowald, can be found in Geisenheim.

At the time of National Socialism, trains arrived on platform 4 with extra carriages with children to be "dealt with" under the euthanasia program. These were transferred to the "Children's Department" (Kinderfachabteilung) of the nearby Landesheilanstand Eichberg (Eichberg mental hospital, now Vitos Rheingau, near Eberbach Abbey) to be used for "scientific purposes" and mostly murdered. Adult patients also came to the Eichberg hospital via Hattenheim station, where they were either killed or transferred to the Hadamar Euthanasia Centre.

== Operations ==
The railway station has a platform next to the entrance building for traffic towards Wiesbaden and Frankfurt and an island platform for tracks 2 and 3. Track 2 is used for traffic towards Koblenz and Neuwied, while the disused track 3 was formerly used for overtaking operations. Track 4 was formerly used for freight, but was demolished in 2015.

=== Regional traffic ===
Hattenheim station is located in the network of the Rhein-Main-Verkehrsverbund (RMV). The station is served every hour by Regionalbahn service RB 10 (RheingauLinie). In the peak hour an extra service reduces intervals to every half hour.

Line	Line name	Route	Frequency
RB 10	RheingauLinie	Neuwied – Koblenz – Rüdesheim – Hattenheim – Eltville – Wiesbaden – Frankfurt (Main)	Hourly

The station is served by bus route 181 of 'Omnibusverkehr Rhein-Nahe, running towards Hallgarten or Geisenheim.

=== Freight traffic ===
The old freight shed and the freight track (track 4) were demolished in 2014.

=== Signal box ===
Signal box Hattenheim Hf was located in the station building. It used a relay interlocking of class Dr S2, which was put into operation in 1954. The signal box was taken out of operation on 3 October 2014 at 3:30 am to be replaced by an electronic interlocking.
