= Eltville station =

Railway station in Eltville, Germany

Eltville
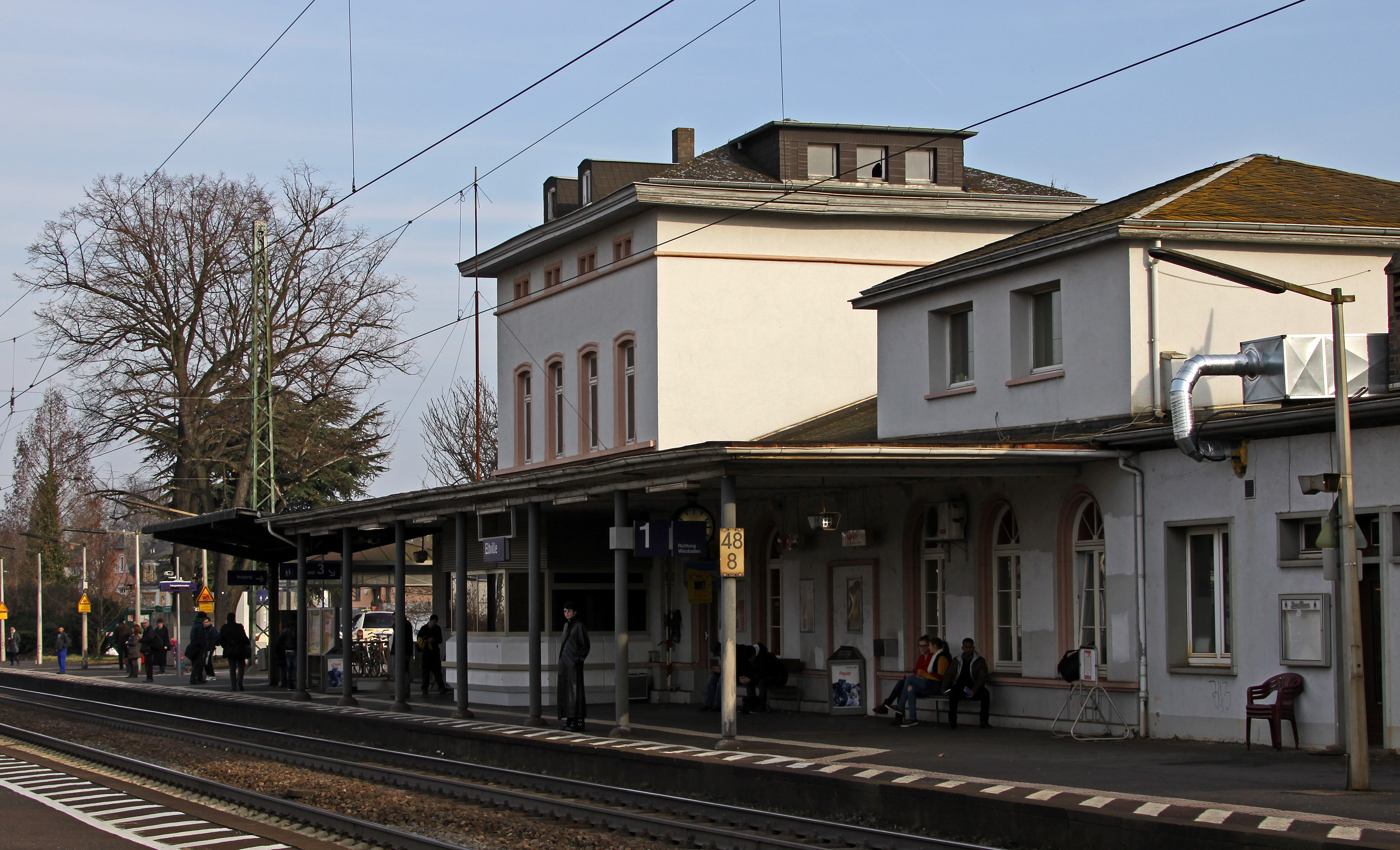

General information
- Location: Wilhelmstr. 14, Eltville, Hesse; Germany
- Coordinates: 50°01′39″N 8°07′18″E
- Lines: East Rhine Railway (48.8 km); Eltville–Schlangenbad Light Railway (closed)
- Platforms: 3

Construction
- Accessible: No (except platform 1)

Other information
- Station code: 1572
- DS100 code: FELT
- IBNR: 8001763
- Category: 5
- Fare zone: : 6455
- Website: www.bahnhof.de

History
- Opened: 11 August 1856; 170 years ago

Services
Preceding station	VIAS	Following station
Eltville-Erbach towards Neuwied	RB 10	Niederwalluf towards Frankfurt (Main) Hbf
Location

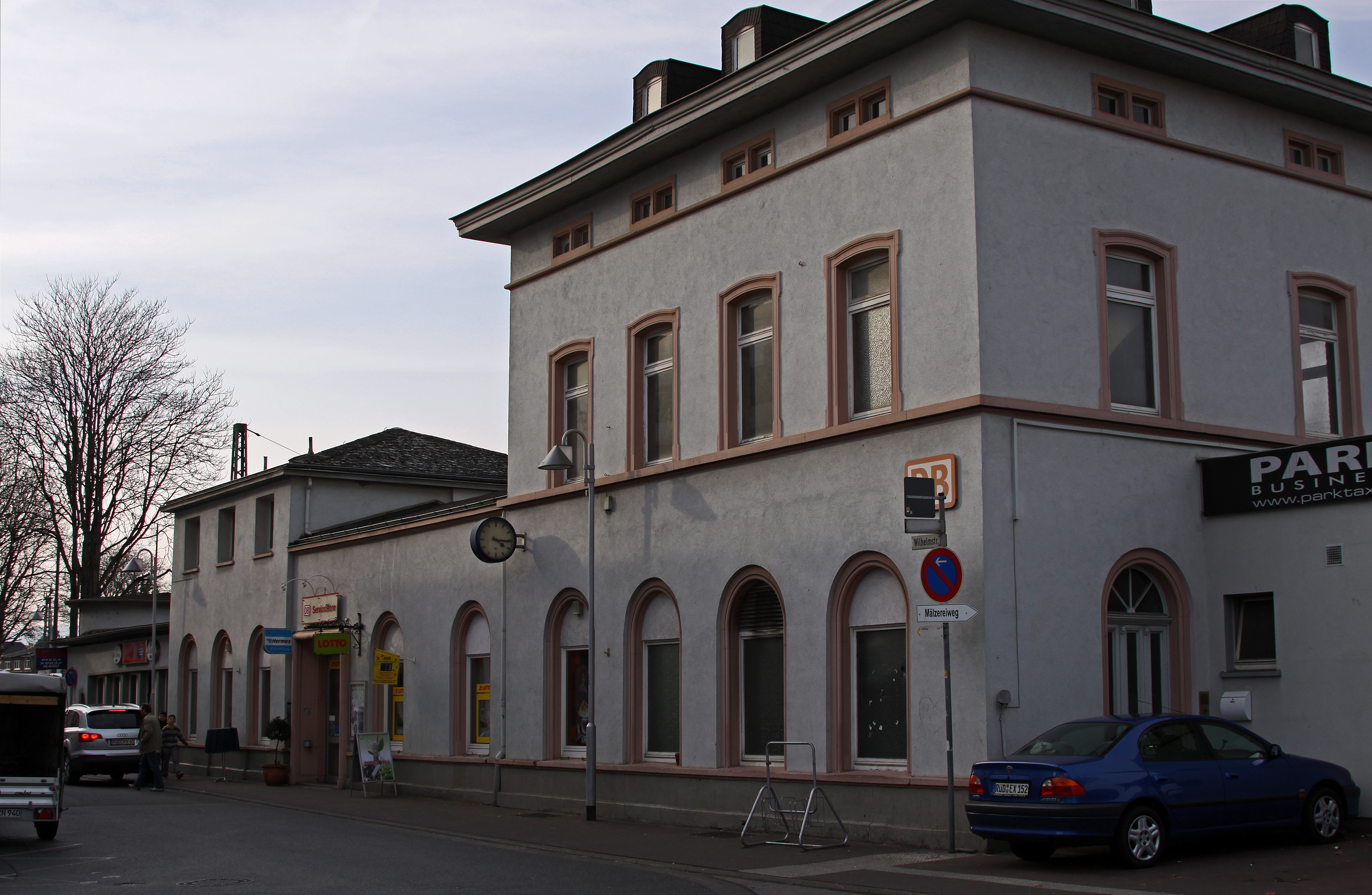
Eltville station

Eltville station is the railway station of Eltville in the Rheingau in the German state of Hesse, on the East Rhine Railway from Wiesbaden to Koblenz. It is classified by Deutsche Bahn as a category 5 station.

== History ==
The station was opened on 11 August 1856 with the opening of the Wiesbaden–Rudesheim section of the Nassau Rhine Railway, operated by the Nassau State Railway. The station building was initially only an open hall.

The Eltville–Schlangenbad Light Railway was opened as the Eltviller Kleinbahn (Eltville light railway) on 1 July 1895. This ran from the station forecourt through the vineyards and the winery village of Neudorf (now called Martinsthal), past the high grounds of Rauenthal in the Taunus up to the spa town of Schlangenbad, which had been known for two centuries. On 1 December 1922, the light railway was closed due to declining passenger numbers. It had been taken over by the Allgemeine Deutsche Eisenbahn-Betriebs-GmbH (General German Light Railway Company) and its operating company, the Allgemeinen Deutschen Eisenbahn-Betriebs-GmbH (General German Railways Operating Company, ADEG) in 1915.

== Infrastructure ==
The reception building is a two-storey stucco building with a hipped roof, with lower annexes at both ends.

Eltville station is the only station between Rüdesheim and Wiesbaden Central Station that still has a third track. This is occasionally used to allow overtaking. Eltville station has a “home” platform (platform 1), which is barrier-free for the disabled, and an island platform for tracks 2 and 3, which can only be reached by stairs from an underpass. Track 1 is used by trains towards Wiesbaden and Frankfurt and track 2 is used by services towards Rudesheim, Kaub, Koblenz and Neuwied. Points and signals at the station are controlled by a push button interlocking installed in 1954.

In the station forecourt there is a bus stop served by regular services of Omnibusverkehr Rhein-Nahe (the local Deutsche Bahn-owned bus company) to Rudesheim and Wiesbaden, to Kiedrich and Eberbach Abbey or to Martinsthal, Rauenthal and Schlangenbad. Also located at the station is a taxistand. There is a commuter car parking area on the other side of the Weinhohle underpass, which is within walking distance along the Mälzereiweg path.

== Rail services ==
The station has not been served by long-distance passenger services for years.

Fares at Eltville are set by the Rhein-Main-Verkehrsverbund (Rhine-Main Transport Association, RMV). Eltville station is served by Regionalbahn line RB 10. Since the introduction of the 2010/2011 timetable on 12 December 2010, this route has been operated by the low-floor FLIRT electric multiple units operated by VIAS as the RheingauLinie, serving Eltville station every hour and in some cases during peak hour, every half hour.

Line	Line name	Route	Frequency
RB 10	RheingauLinie	Neuwied – Koblenz Stadtmitte – Koblenz Hbf – Rüdesheim (Rhein) – Eltville – Wiesbaden Hbf – Frankfurt (Main) Hbf	Hourly (+ an additional service in the peak)

=== Freight ===
Freight operations at the station were closed at the end of the 20th century. The freight tracks are largely in place, but have been cut off from the rail network. The former freight shed was on the other side of track 4, which was formerly used for freight traffic.
