= Frankfurt Hauptbahnhof murder =

2019 murder in Frankfurt, Germany

On 29 July 2019, a man murdered an eight-year-old boy in Frankfurt Hauptbahnhof, Germany.

== Attack ==
On 29 July 2019, Habte Araya deliberately pushed an eight-year-old boy, Leo, and his mother, onto railway tracks. This happened on platform 7 of Frankfurt Hauptbahnhof, the main train station in Frankfurt, in the German state of Hesse, as an Intercity Express passenger train entered the station. The mother rolled herself off the tracks, avoiding the train; Leo was killed instantly when he was hit by the same train. Araya also tried to push a woman in her late seventies onto the tracks. All three victims were strangers to Araya, who was chased and apprehended by onlookers.

== Perpetrator ==
At the time he carried out the attack, Araya was a 40 year-old married father-of-three from Eritrea. He was a refugee living in Switzerland who had been granted asylum there in 2009. He was on the run from Swiss police, who sought him for the false imprisonment of his wife and their three children earlier in July 2019.

== Reaction ==
The attack was widely covered by German media and also reported by the media in some other countries. It triggered a debate about immigration and crime, along with calls for increased security at train stations and Germany's international borders.

== Legal proceedings ==
Araya was tried in August 2020, with the proceedings to decide whether it was manslaughter or murder. On 28 August, the attack was ruled to be murder and attempted murder. On the same day, he was sentenced to be detained for life; due to his acute paranoid schizophrenia, he was ruled not criminally responsible and sent to a psychiatric hospital.
