= Unkel station =

Railway station in Unkel, Germany

Unkel
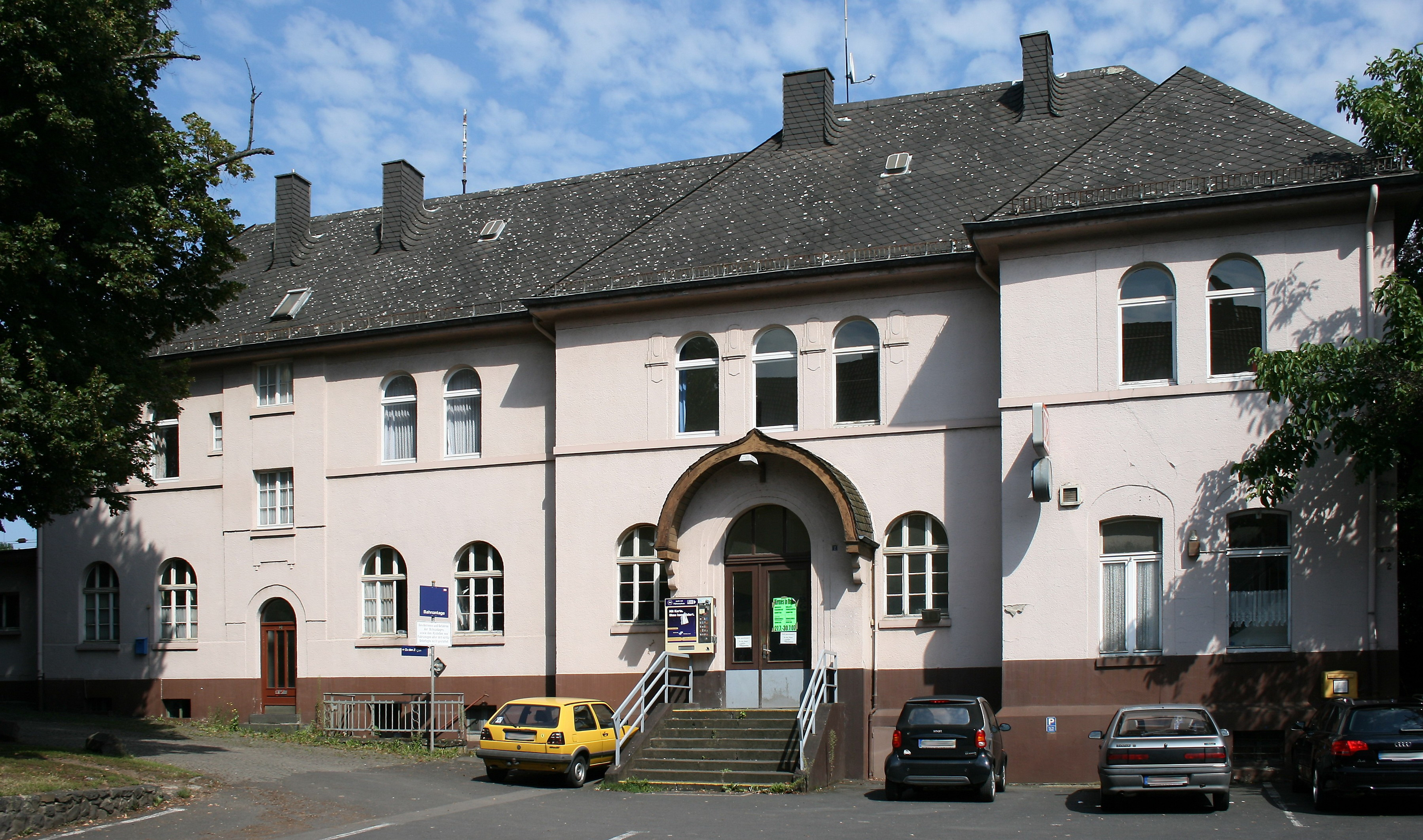
- Former Unkel station building

General information
- Location: Siebebgebirgsstr. 2, Unkel, Rhineland-Palatinate; Germany
- Coordinates: 50°36′13.2″N 7°13′10.2″E
- Lines: East Rhine Railway (KBS 465)
- Platforms: 3

Construction
- Accessible: No

Other information
- Station code: 6334
- DS100 code: KUN
- IBNR: 8005970
- Category: 5
- Fare zone: VRM: 227; VRS: 2967 (VRM transitional tariff)
- Website: www.bahnhof.de

History
- Opened: 1870

Services
Preceding station	DB Regio NRW	Following station
Bad Honnef (Rhein) towards Mönchengladbach Hbf	RE 8	Linz (Rhein) towards Koblenz Hbf
Bad Honnef (Rhein) towards Mönchengladbach Hbf	RB 27	Erpel (Rhein) towards Koblenz Hbf
Location

Unkel station is on the East Rhine Railway (German: Rechte Rheinstrecke) and is the only station in the town of Unkel in the German state of Rhineland-Palatinate. It was built in 1870. The station has three platform tracks on two platforms. The regional rail services are organised by the Verkehrsverbund Rhein-Mosel (Rhine-Moselle transport association, VRM) and the Verkehrsverbund Rhein-Sieg (Rhine-Sieg transport association, VRS). The station is classified by Deutsche Bahn as a category 5 station.

== History ==
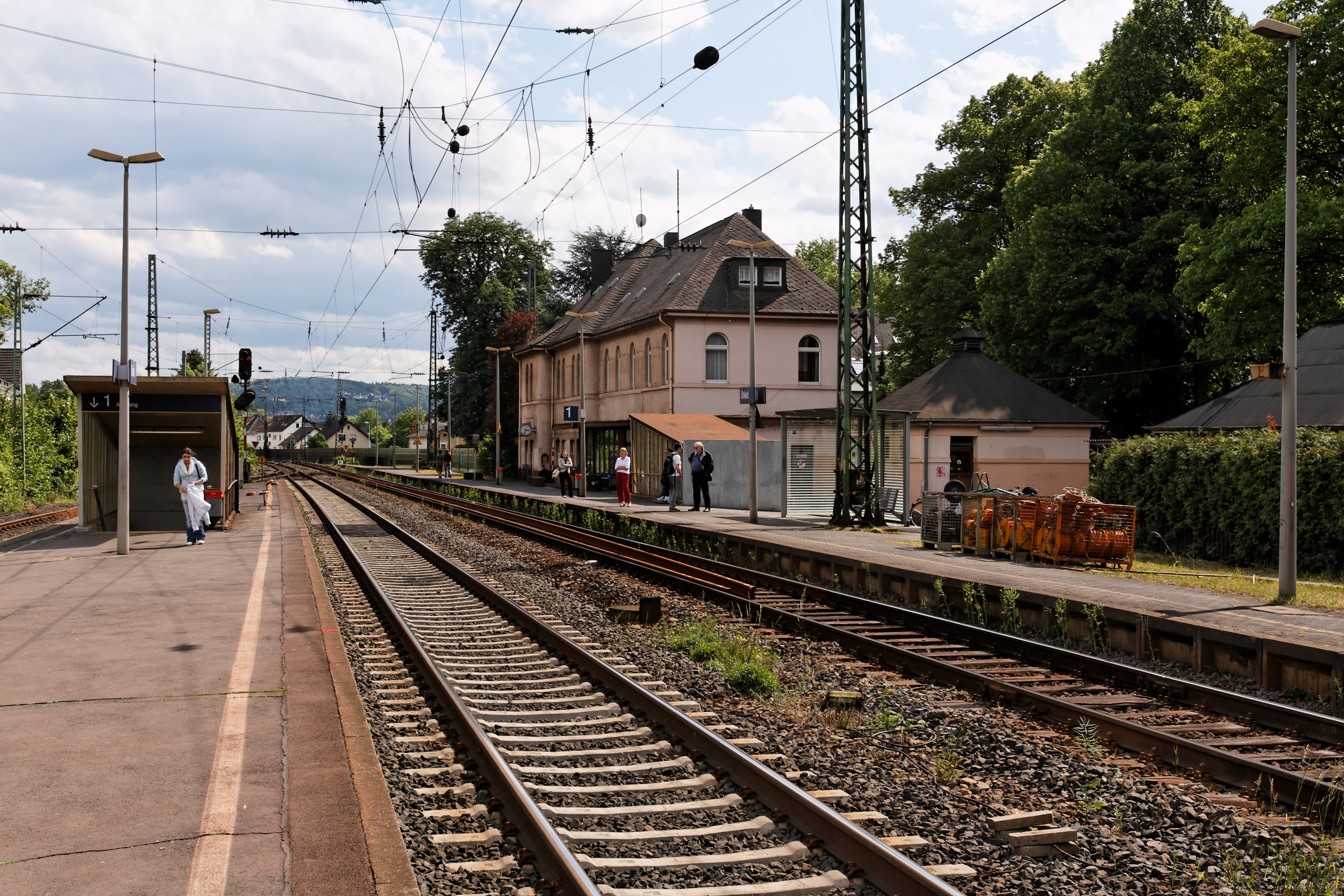
Unkel station with the former station building

After the West Rhine Railway was completed in 1858, the Rhenish Railway Company (Rheinische Eisenbahn-Gesellschaft) began construction of the East Rhine line from Beuel to Neuwied. There was some discussion of the need for stations between Honnef and Linz. Erpel, Rheinbreitbach and Unkel each wanted its own station. The railway company originally did want to build a station. After protests from the mayor and the district administrator stations were built, first at Unkel and later at Erpel.

In the summer of 2006, the station building was closed after the station bar was abandoned. Weather-protected seating was built on the platform on the line to Koblenz as a replacement for the closed waiting room.

== Services ==
The station is served by RE8 services hourly. On working days, it is also served by RB27 services, which together provide a service every half-hour to Cologne and Rommerskirchen and to Koblenz.

Line	Service	Route	Frequency
RE 8	Rhein-Erft-Express	Mönchengladbach – Rheydt – Cologne – Porz (Rhein) – Troisdorf – Bonn-Beuel – Unkel – Linz (Rhein) - Neuwied - Koblenz Stadtmitte - Koblenz	Hourly
RB 27	Rhein-Erft-Bahn	Mönchengladbach – Rheydt – Cologne – Köln/Bonn Flughafen – Troisdorf – Bonn-Beuel – Unkel – Linz (Rhein) - Neuwied - Koblenz-Ehrenbreitstein -Koblenz	Hourly
