= Fernbahntunnel Frankfurt am Main =

Expansion of Frankfurt Central Station in Germany

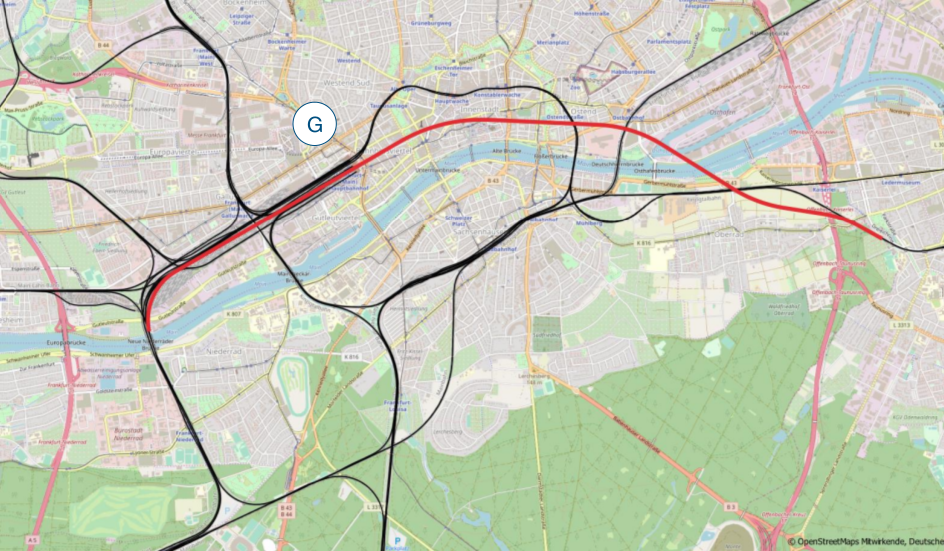

Fernbahntunnel Frankfurt am Main (German for Long-distance railway tunnel Frankfurt am Main) is a proposed expansion of Frankfurt central station. The project was added to the Federal Transport Infrastructure Plan 2030 (Bundesverkehrswegeplan 2030) in 2018 and is supposed to deliver long-term relief to the above-ground terminus, a major bottleneck in Germany's passenger rail network.

The tunnel will connect the two main approaches to Frankfurt Hauptbahnhof without requiring trains to reverse: to/from Frankfurt Stadion station, where the lines from Cologne and Mannheim are merging, and to/from Hanau Hauptbahnhof, where the lines from Aschaffenburg and Fulda are merging.
