= East Rhine Railway =

Railway line in Germany

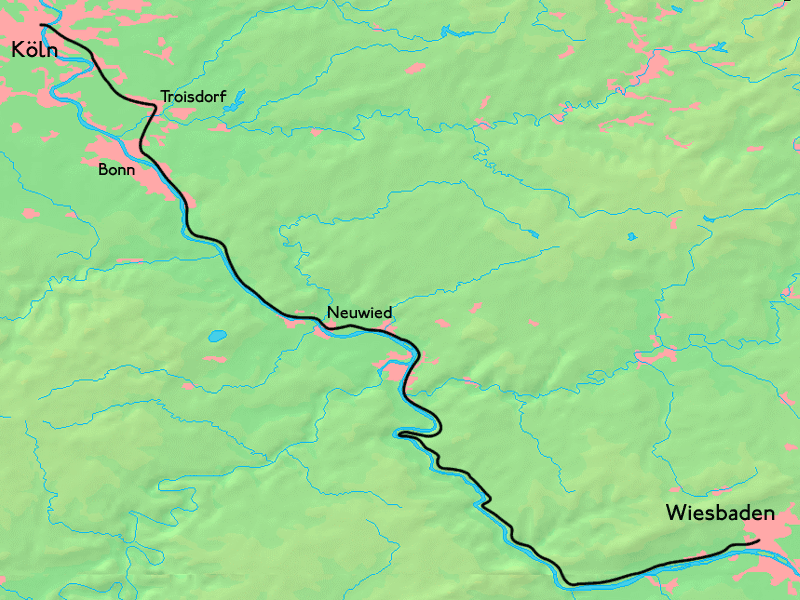

Overview
- Native name: Rechte Rheinstrecke
- Line number: 2324 (Köln-Kalk Nord–Koblenz); 507 (Koblenz–Wiesbaden)
- Locale: North Rhine-Westphalia, Rhineland-Palatinate, Hesse, Germany
- Termini: Cologne; Wiesbaden

Service
- Route number: 465 (Köln–Koblenz); 466 (Koblenz–Wiesbaden)

Technical
- Line length: 179 km (111 mi)
- Num of tracks: 2
- Track gauge: 1,435 mm (4 ft 8 1/2 in) standard gauge
- Electrification: 15 kV/16.7 Hz AC; Overhead catenary
- Operating speed: 140 km/h (87 mph) (maximum)

The East Rhine Railway (German: Rechte Rheinstrecke, literally 'right (of the) Rhine railway') is a major, double-track, electrified railway line, running along the right bank of the Rhine from Cologne to Wiesbaden. The 179-kilometer (111.2 mi)-long line forms two Deutsche Bahn routes. Route 465 extends from Cologne to Koblenz, via Troisdorf, Bonn-Beuel, Unkel, and Neuwied. From Koblenz, Route 466 extends to Wiesbaden, via Rüdesheim am Rhein. Together with the Taunus railway (Route 645.1), the line is used by Stadt-Express line SE-10 of the Rhine-Main Transport Association, which runs from Frankfurt to Koblenz and Neuwied.

With the Cologne-Frankfurt high-speed railway and the Sieg Railway, the East Rhine Railway forms a six-track line between Cologne-Porz and Troisdorf. It includes two tunnels between Rüdesheim and Niederlahnstein, including the well-known Loreley Tunnel near Sankt Goarshausen.

== History ==
Soon after the opening of the first railways in the region, a line on the right bank of the Rhine began to be discussed. In 1844 the Mayor of Deutz suggested building a line from Deutz via Rüdesheim to Wiesbaden. In 1852, the town of Neuwied also began to press strongly for the building of a railway. However, others, particularly Prussia, had substantial reservations. There were military objections to a railway line along the Rhine (the extension of the West Rhine railway past Rolandseck was similarly delayed). In particular, the Prussian military objected that the suggested route would pass close to the Ehrenbreitstein Fortress, part of the Koblenz Fortress system. Therefore, in 1853 the Prussian War Ministry declared itself against the line.

=== Building of the southern section ===
For the Duchy of Nassau such considerations had less weight than the economic advantages. Therefore, it gave the Wiesbaden Railway Company (Wiesbadener Eisenbahngesellschaft) a concession to build the East Rhine line on Nassau national territory. On 11 August 1856, the first section of the Nassau Rhine Railway (Nassauische Rheinbahn) was opened from Wiesbaden to Rüdesheim. Because of the difficult nature of the construction, the Nassau government took over construction in 1858, establishing the Nassau State Railway in 1861. As a result, the line was not extended to Oberlahnstein until 22 February 1862 and Niederlahnstein until 3 June 1864. From 1862 to 1900 the Bingerbrück–Rüdesheim train ferry operated between Bingerbrück and Rüdesheim, connecting the East Rhine lines and the Nahe Valley Railway.

The construction of the Sieg Railway from Deutz to Giessen (which started in 1859) enabled Nassau to negotiate with Prussia over the continuation of the line, since the planned Sieg line passed through the Dillenburg district, which was part of Nassau. Finally in 1860 an agreement between both states was concluded, which allowed Prussia to build the Sieg line. In return Prussia agreed to build the Pfaffendorf Bridge, which connected the line near Niederlahnstein with the West Rhine Railway (Linke Rheinstrecke) in Koblenz finished the year before. The bridge was inaugurated on 3 June 1864. A continuation of the East Rhine line through Prussia was not possible for the time being, because the concession that the Rhenish Railway had received for the West Rhine line had specified that no concession would be given for a railway on the right bank of the Rhine before 1876.

=== Building of the northern section ===
As a result of the Austro-Prussian War of 1866, Nassau became part of Prussia, changing the situation in the Rhine completely. The Rhenish Railway Company (Rheinische Eisenbahn-Gesellschaft) now had an interest in completing the East Rhine line, and soon received a concession for it. On 27 October 1869, the extension of the line was opened from Niederlahnstein to Neuwied.

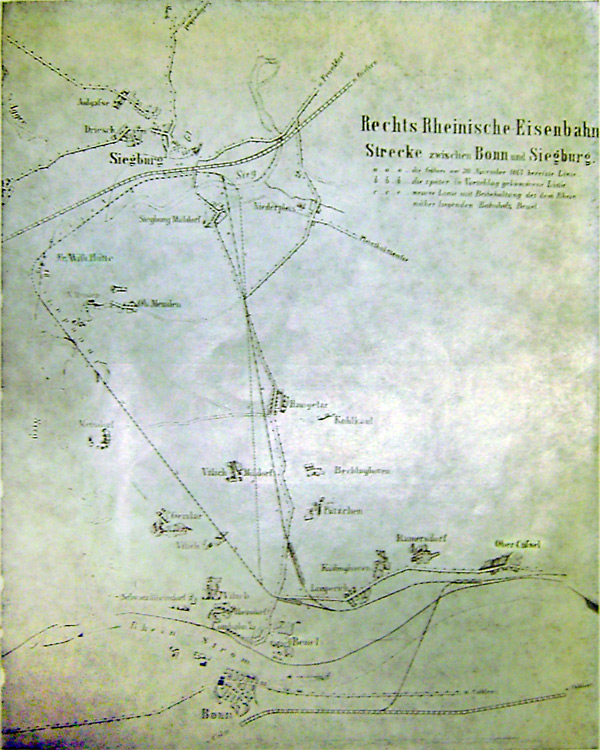
Planning options considered for the East Rhine line between Beuel and Siegburg. The curved route via Friedrich-Wilhelms-Hütte was built.

The route of the northern end was contentious. The concession referred to a line between Siegburg and Niederlahnstein and under the original plans the line should have turned at Beuel on the Rhine to Siegburg. Later the line should have been extended via the Agger River valley to Overath and then via Witten to Bochum, or alternatively Essen. These plans were, however, viewed critically in Cologne, since it would have involved the construction of a major traffic axis through the Bergisches Land near Cologne. Gustav von Mevissen, president of the Rhenish Railway, preferred a route via Troisdorf and Opladen to Essen.

Emil Langen, board member of the Rhenish Railway and director of Friedrich-Wilhelms Ironworks in Troisdorf (now the location of the suburb and station of Troisdorf-Friedrich-Wilhelms-Hütte), finally implemented a change in the planned route north of Beuel. The new route went northeast from Beuel, crossing the Sieg river at Menden (now part of Sankt Augustin). A station would be built at the Friedrich-Wilhelms works and the line would then turn southeast to parallel the Sieg Railway to Siegburg.

On July 11, 1870 the section of line was opened from Neuwied to Oberkassel, where the Bonn–Oberkassel train ferry provided a connection between the West Rhine and East Rhine lines. In addition, the line from Friedrich-Wilhelms-Hütte to Siegburg had already been completed; the complete opening of the line only awaited the completion of the Sieg bridge. During the Franco-Prussian War, the line was of great strategic importance as a supply route. As a result, the building of the Sieg bridge was accelerated with extra workers, starting in the late summer of 1870. The whole route was opened on March 1, 1871. At the same time a branch was opened from Friedrich-Wilhelms-Hütte to Troisdorf and the line to Cologne, which would later become the main line.

=== Later changes ===
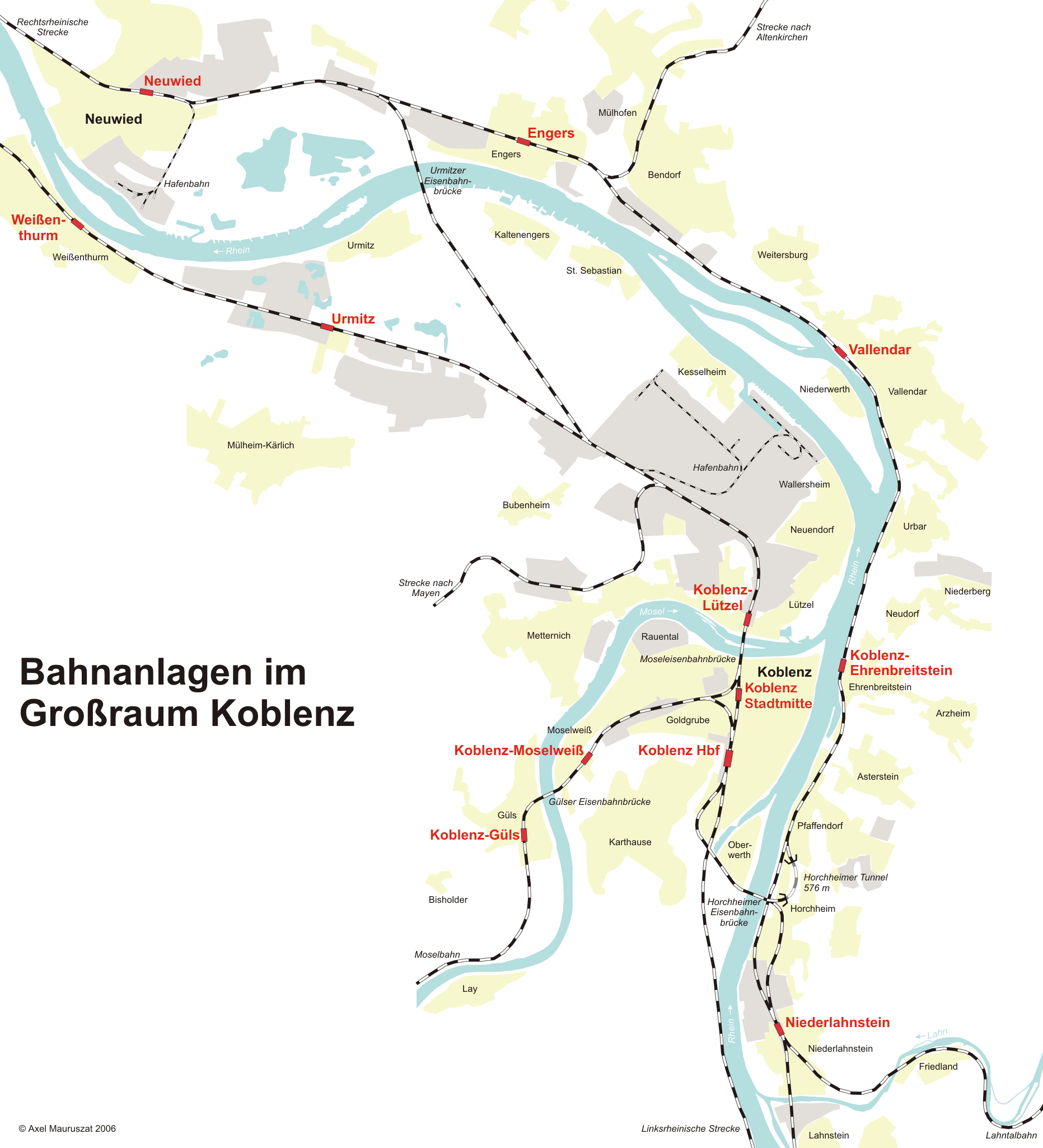
Map of railway lines in the Koblenz area

In 1878/79, the Horchheim rail bridge was built south of Koblenz, creating a further connection between the West Rhine and East Rhine lines.

During World War I, three Rhine crossings were built using very similar building methods:

- From 1913 to 1915, the Hindenburg Bridge was built between Rüdesheim am Rhein and Bingen-Kempten, connecting to the West Rhine line and the Nahe Valley Railway (Nahetalbahn).
- From 1916 to 1918, the Neuwied–Koblenz line, including the Kronprinz-Wilhelm Bridge was built between Urmitz and Neuwied-Engers.
- From 1916 to 1919, the Ludendorff Bridge was built between Erpel and Remagen, connecting the East Rhine railway with the West Rhine line and the strategically important Ahr Valley Railway (Ahrtalbahn). It became famous as the "Remagen Bridge" in the last days of World War II.

All three bridges were destroyed in World War II. Only the Kronprinz-Wilhelm Bridge was rebuilt, as the Urmitz railway bridge, in 1954.

In 1961, during the electrification of the line, new single-line tunnels were built parallel to the existing double-line Loreley and Rossstein tunnels. The old tunnels were then converted to single-line operations and electrified.

With the opening of the Cologne-Frankfurt high-speed rail line at the end of 2002, Troisdorf station was completely rebuilt and the connections from the East Rhine railway towards Siegburg were removed.

== Operations ==
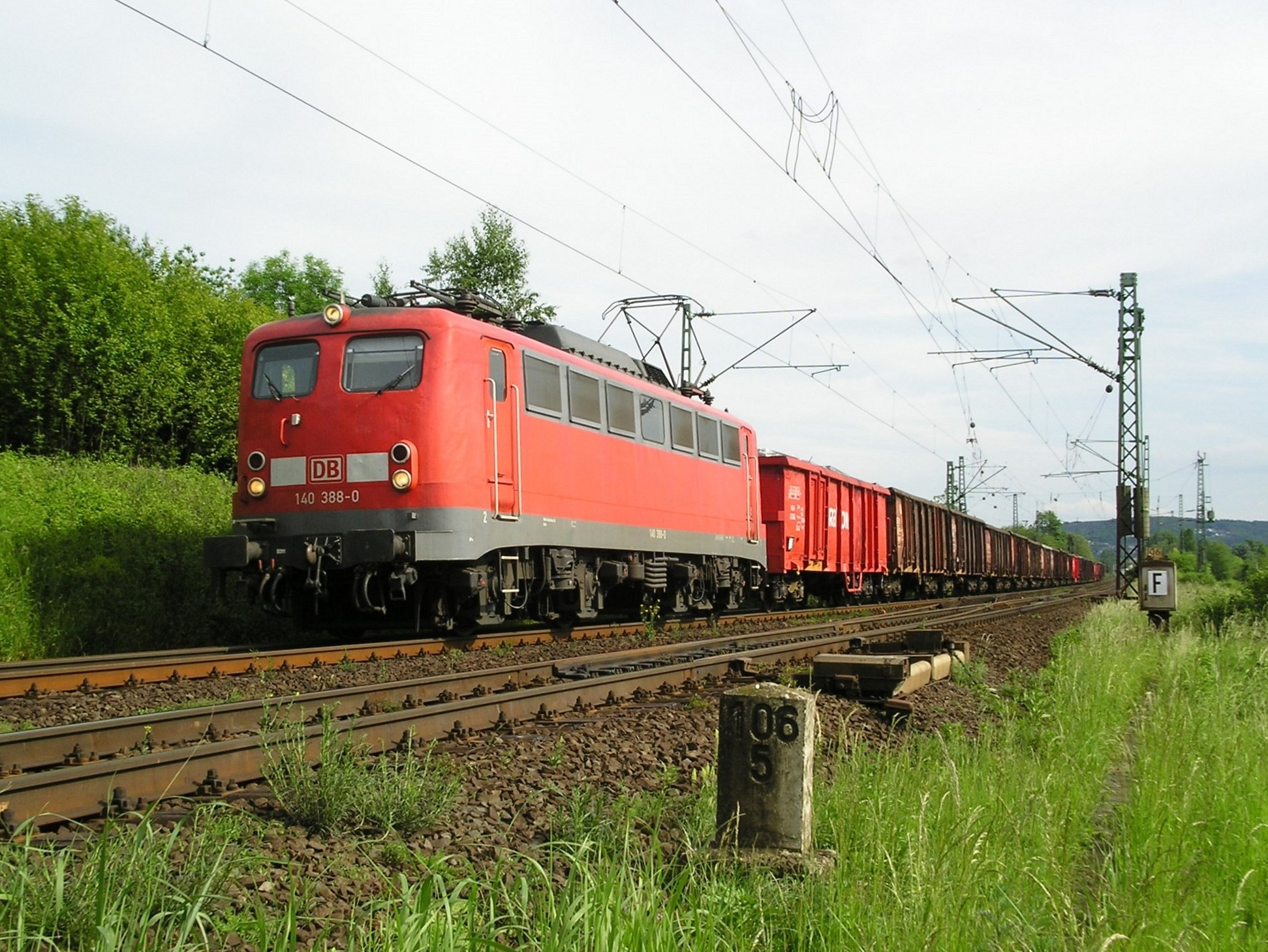
Freight train north of Unkel

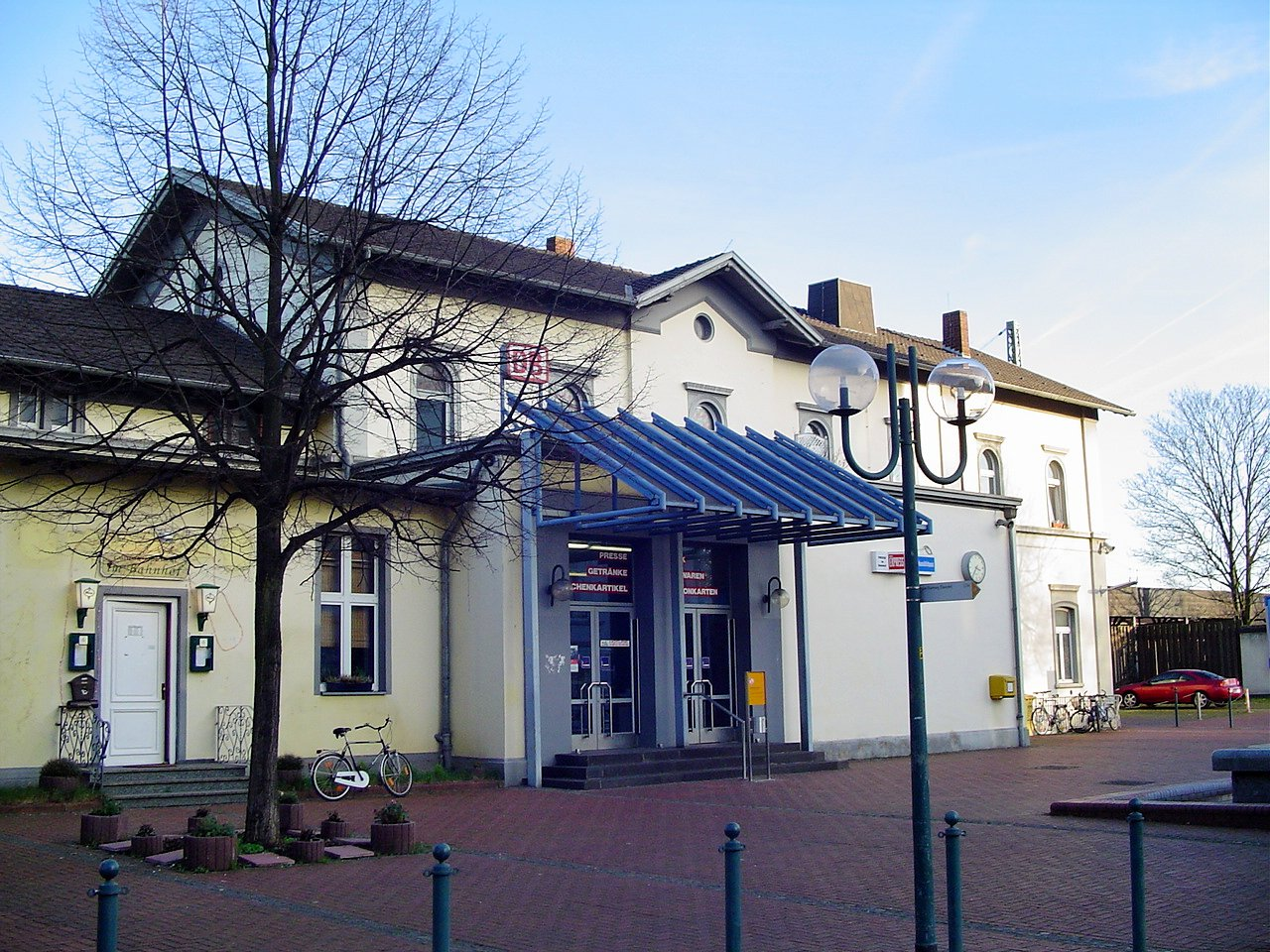
Bonn-Beuel station

The line is heavily congested and gives priority to long-distance freight trains. Long distance passenger trains in the Rhine Valley use the West Rhine line and the Cologne-Frankfurt high-speed line. When there are line closures on the left side, the long-distance trains are diverted to the East Rhine route. In that case the stop for Bonn is replaced with Bonn-Beuel.

Passenger services on the line are provided by RegionalBahn and Regional-Express trains. According to Deutsche Bahn timetables, the East Rhine route is KBS 465 (Cologne-Koblenz) and KBS 466 (Koblenz-Wiesbaden). The KBS 465 added a section from Cologne to Mönchengladbach a few years ago. All passenger trains start or finish at the Koblenz main station. Trains from there in the direction of Wiesbaden cross on the Horchheimer Bridge (south of Koblenz). Trains travelling in the direction of Cologne cross the Urmitz Railway Bridge (north of Koblenz), or travel via Vallendar over the Horchheimer Bridge.

Generally Regional-Express trains operate every two hours between the Frankfurt and Wiesbaden main train stations and Koblenz. RegionalBahn trains operate every two hours between the Wiesbaden main station and Koblenz.

Regional-Express trains operate every hour between Mönchengladbach main station and Koblenz, via Cologne Central Station and Vallendar, using the Horchheim bridge. RegionalBahn trains operate every hour between Mönchengladbach Hbf, Cologne Hbf and Koblenz, via the Urmitz Railway Bridge.

The northern section is also served hourly by the Rhein-Erft-Express (RE 8) and the Rhein-Erft-Bahn (RB 27) lines. The RE-8 serves the Cologne/Bonn Airport station and extends south of Koblenz on the Horchheimer Bridge. It uses Series-425 electric locomotives and a maximum speed of 140 km/h. The RB 27 operates between Porz and Koblenz, crossing from the north via the Urmitz Bridge. It operates non-stop from Koblenz to Cochem twice daily. The RB-27 uses Series-143 electric locomotives and three double-decker carriages with a maximum speed of 120 km/h. From Moenchengladbach to Rommerskirchen, the tariffs of the Verkehrsverbund Rhein-Ruhr (VRR) apply; from Grevenbroich to Neuwied, those of the Verkehrsverbund Rhein-Sieg (VRS); and from Unkel to Koblenz, the tariffs of the Verkehrsverbund Rhein-Mosel (VRM).

Until 2010, the southern section was served by the Loreley-Bahn (RB 10) and the Loreley-Express (RE 10) services, using electric class 143 or 110 locomotives and 4-5 coaches every one or two hours. In 2007, the operation of services on the section from the Koblenz–Frankfurt section was tendered by the Rhein-Main-Verkehrsverbund (Rhine-Main Transport Association, RMV) and the Zweckverband Schienenpersonennahverkehr Rheinland-Pfalz Nord (Association for Passenger Rail Transport of Rhineland-Palatinate North). On 12 December 2010, VIAS GmbH took over operations of the service, now called the RheingauLinie (originally numbered SE 10, but called RB 10 again from December 2016). Between Koblenz, Lahnstein and Wiesbaden trains now stop at every station, but between Wiesbaden and Frankfurt Central Station there now only two stops. Similarly, between Neuwied and Koblenz Central Station there were initially no stations. Since its completion in April 2011, Koblenz Stadtmitte station has also been served. The services run every hour, sometimes even every half-hour. VIAS GmbH uses new Stadler FLIRT sets for the service. Because of the renewal of track on the line in 2010 and the good acceleration of the FLIRT sets, the travel time is only slightly longer than that of the former RE 10 service, which did not stop at each station.

Between Koblenz and Kaub, tariffs of the Verkehrsverbund Rhein-Mosel apply and between Lorchhausen and Wiesbaden/Frankfurt, the tariffs of the Rhein-Main-Verkehrsverbund (RMV).

== Current developments ==
=== Track reconstruction/electronic interlockings ===
Deutsche Bahn AG planned further closures on the line. Unkel, Rheinbrohl, Rüdesheim, Hattenheim and Oestrich-Winkel stations would be largely abandoned in connection with the installation of electronic interlockings on the line. A simulation and an operational test in the course of the Netz 21 (network 21) strategy had shown at the end of 1998 that with new, fast rolling stock for regional services and alternating stops, the top speed on the Wiesbaden–Neuwied section could be raised from 50 to 80 km/h and that several overtaking loops, 67 sets of points and 10 km of track could be dispensed with.

The dismantling was carried out without Federal Railway Authority (Eisenbahn-Bundesamt, EBA) approval. The line is already at 93% capacity, with an extreme mix of different types of trains with considerably differing top speeds, including scheduled passenger services, which is already subject a high level of delays. The EBA has also asked DB Netz to provide more overtaking tracks in the stations of Niederdollendorf, Unkel, Rheinbrohl, Bad Hönningen, Hattenheim and Oestrich-Winkel, some of which were illegally withdrawn from railway operations.

On 3 October 2014, the signal boxes in Schierstein, Niederwalluf, Eltville, Hattenheim and Geisenheim were taken out of service at 5:30 am CET and signalling has since been controlled by the operations centre in Frankfurt and, if necessary, via the under operations centre (Unterzentrale, UZ) in Oberlahnstein. The signal box in Oestrich-Winkel will remain for at least two more years (until ca. 2017), the signal box in Rüdesheim is to be permanently preserved as a so-called Inselstellwerk (island signal box).

In 2026, intensive renovation works on the East Rhine railway are expected to be completed, due.to the plans of the reactivation of the Engers-Au railway upto Siershahn, theres a need to consteuct a turnout again to connect the East Rhine railway to the Engers-Au railway in Engers, since on the former turnout a noise barrier has been consteucted. In November 2026, it was announced that, following the completion of the renovation work on the East Rhine railway, no turnout will initially be installed at Engers station to reconnect the two lines to another. However, provisions will be made within the new electronic signalbox German: elektronisches Stellwerk, short: (ESTW), to allow for a future connection between the two lines at Engers station. Consequently, a new turnout will now need to be installed somewhat further to the north. In addition, the overhead contact lines and signal cables will require adjustments.

=== S-Bahn line between Troisdorf and Bonn–Oberkassel ===
In order to link Bonn to Cologne and the Cologne Bonn Airport, the S-Bahn line that connects Cologne with Troisdorf is being extended along the East Rhine Railway to Bonn-Oberkassel. The first plans for this line were made in the 1990s as part of the planning approval procedure for the Cologne-Frankfurt high-speed railway. In addition to the existing stations on the Right Rhine line, new stations are planned in Bonn-Ramersdorf and Bonn-Vilich. The latter is to be established as a two-level station with a link with the Siebengebirgsbahn, a section of the Bonn Stadtbahn. The construction costs for the 13 km-long line is (as of December 2014) up to €502 to be mainly borne by the federal Government. The state of NRW is contributing €47.5 million to these costs.

According to Deutsche Bahn’s plans, construction is to begin in early 2017. Since the trains of the East Rhine railway are planned to run on schedule during the construction period, a construction period of twelve years is estimated. The route is due to be finished at the end of 2028. On the section between Troisdorf and Bonn-Beuel, S-Bahn services are planned to commence at the end of 2026.

=== New stations ===
The construction of new stations is planned in Bendorf (at the Rheinstraße level crossing) and in Koblenz-Horchheim (at the Alte Heerstraße overbridge). The construction costs are estimated at €1.5 million in Bendorf and €1 million in Horchheim.

== External links (in German) ==
NRWbahnarchiv von André Joost:

- Description of Line 2324: (Cologne-Kalk North ↔) Troisdorf ↔ Koblenz-Ehrenbreitstein
- Description of the former Line 10: Siegburg/Bonn ↔ Friedrich-Wilhelms-Hütte

www.eisenbahntunnel-portal.de:

- Line 2324, Photos of Tunnel Portals
- Line 3507, Photos of Tunnel Portals
- Former Line 3009, Photos of Tunnel Portals
