= Frankfurt (Main) Hauptbahnhof =

Busiest railway station in Hesse, Germany

Frankfurt am Main Hbf
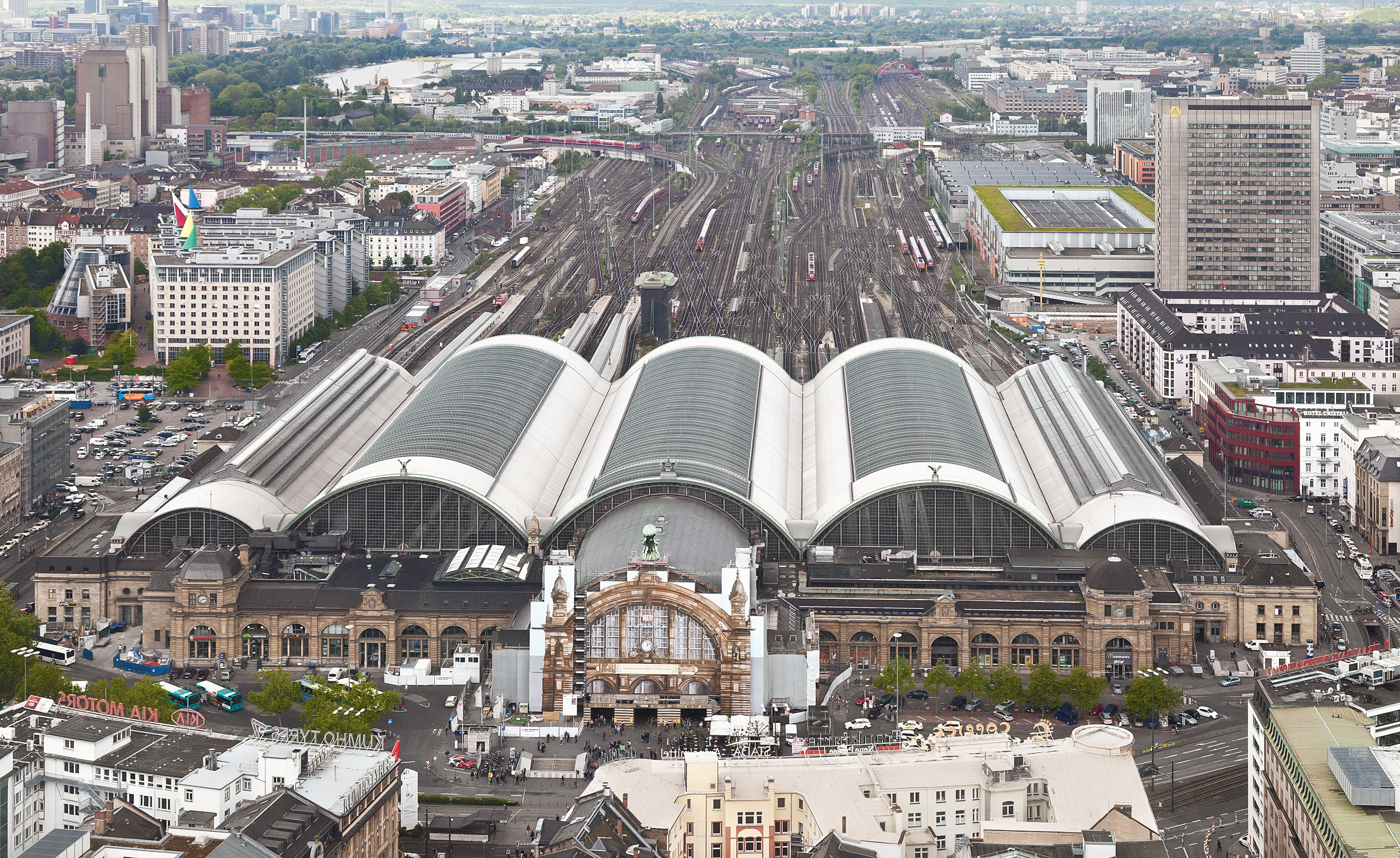

General information
- Location: Frankfurt, Hesse; Germany
- Coordinates: 50°6′25″N 8°39′45″E
- Owner: DB InfraGO
- Lines: Cologne–Frankfurt high-speed; Main–Weser Railway; Frankfurt–Göttingen railway; Frankfurt–Hanau; Taunus Railway; Main Railway; Main-Neckar Railway; Underground: Main-Lahn Railway; Homburg Railway
- Platforms: 24 mainline (26 tracks on one level); 4 S-Bahn (Tiefbahnhof); 4 U-Bahn (3 for passengers); 3× 2 Tram
- Connections: Frankfurt (Main) Hauptbahnhof underground

Construction
- Accessible: Yes
- Architect: Hermann Eggert and Johann Wilhelm Schwedler
- Architectural style: Renaissance revival (facade); Neoclassicism (extensions)

Other information
- Station code: 1866
- DS100 code: FF
- Category: 1
- Fare zone: : 5001
- Website: www.bahnhof.de

History
- Opened: 18 August 1888; 138 years ago

Passengers
- 493,000 daily
Services
Preceding station	DB Fernverkehr	Following station
Frankfurt Airport Terminus	ICE 4 reverses out	Hannover Hbf towards Kiel Hbf
Mannheim Hbf towards München Hbf	ICE 11 reverses out	Fulda towards Berlin Gesundbrunnen
Mannheim Hbf towards Brig, Chur or Interlaken Ost	ICE 12 reverses out	Hanau Hbf towards Berlin Ostbahnhof
Terminus	ICE 15	Fulda towards Berlin Hbf
Kassel-Wilhelmshöhe towards Hamburg Hbf	ICE/ECE 20 reverses out	Mannheim Hbf towards Basel SBB
Kassel-Wilhelmshöhe towards Hamburg Hbf or Kiel Hbf	ICE 22 reverses out	Mannheim Hbf towards Stuttgart Hbf
Gießen towards Westerland (Sylt)	ICE 24	Terminus
Darmstadt Hbf towards Karlsruhe Hbf	ICE 26 reverses out	Gießen towards Bremen Hbf
Terminus	IC 34	Frankfurt West towards Dortmund Hbf or Münster Hbf
Frankfurt Airport towards Dortmund Hbf or Essen Hbf	ICE 41 reverses out	Aschaffenburg Hbf towards München Hbf
Terminus	ICE 49	Frankfurt Airport towards Köln Hbf
Fulda towards Dresden Hbf	ICE 50 reverses out	Frankfurt Airport towards Wiesbaden Hbf
Terminus	ICE 62	Darmstadt Hbf towards Graz Hbf
Terminus	ICE 78	Frankfurt Airport towards Amsterdam Centraal
Terminus	ICE 79	Frankfurt Airport towards Brussels-South
Terminus	ICE/TGV 82	Mannheim Hbf towards Paris Est
Terminus	ICE/TGV 84	Mannheim Hbf towards Marseille
Terminus	ECE 85	Mannheim Hbf towards Milano Centrale
Terminus	IC 87	Darmstadt Hbf towards Singen (Hohentwiel)
Terminus	ICE 89	Darmstadt Hbf One-way operation
Frankfurt Airport towards Dortmund Hbf	ICE 91 reverses out	Würzburg Hbf towards Wien Hbf
Preceding station	ÖBB	Following station
Terminus	Railjet Express	Darmstadt Hbf towards Vienna Airport
Preceding station	DB Regio Bayern	Following station
Terminus	RE 54	Frankfurt Süd towards Bamberg
Terminus	RE 55	Frankfurt Süd towards Würzburg Hbf
Preceding station	DB Regio Mitte	Following station
Terminus	RE 2 Südwest-Express	Frankfurt-Niederrad towards Koblenz Hbf
Terminus	RE 4	Frankfurt-Höchst towards Karlsruhe Hbf
Terminus	RE 14 Südwest-Express	Frankfurt-Höchst towards Mannheim Hbf
Terminus	RE 20	Frankfurt-Höchst towards Limburg (Lahn)
Terminus	RE 30	Friedberg (Hess) towards Kassel Hbf
Terminus	RE 50	Frankfurt Süd towards Bebra
Terminus	RE 60	Langen (Hess) towards Mannheim Hbf
Terminus	RE 70	Frankfurt-Niederrad towards Mannheim Hbf
Terminus	RB 22	Frankfurt-Höchst towards Limburg (Lahn)
Terminus	RB 34	Frankfurt (Main) West towards Glauburg-Stockheim
Terminus	RB 51	Frankfurt Süd towards Wächtersbach
Terminus	RB 61	Neu-Isenburg towards Dieburg
Terminus	RB 67	Langen (Hess) towards Mannheim Hbf or Hockenheim
Terminus	RB 68	Langen (Hess) towards Wiesloch-Walldorf
Preceding station	Start	Following station
Terminus	RB 12	Frankfurt-Höchst towards Königstein (Taunus)
Preceding station	Hessische Landesbahn	Following station
Terminus	RB 40	Frankfurt (Main) West towards Dillenburg
Terminus	RB 41	Frankfurt (Main) West towards Marburg (Lahn) or Treysa
Terminus	RB 58	Frankfurt Süd towards Laufach
Preceding station	VIAS	Following station
Terminus	RE 85	Frankfurt (Main) Süd towards Groß-Umstadt-Wiebelsbach
Terminus	RB 10	Frankfurt-Höchst towards Neuwied
Terminus	RB 82	Darmstadt Nord towards Eberbach
Preceding station	Vlexx	Following station
Terminus	RE 3	Frankfurt-Niederrad towards Saarbrücken Hbf
Preceding station	Rhine-Main S-Bahn	Following station
Terminus	S7 (Rhine-Main S-Bahn)	Frankfurt-Niederrad towards Riedstadt-Goddelau
Location

Frankfurt (Main) Hauptbahnhof (in short as Frankfurt (Main) Hbf, in English Frankfurt Central Station) is the busiest train station in the German state of Hesse and the second busiest train station in Germany behind Hamburg Hauptbahnhof. Due to its location near the middle of Germany and usage as a transport hub for long and short distance travelling, Deutsche Bahn refers to it as the most important station in Germany.

== Name ==
The affix "Main" comes from the city's full name, Frankfurt am Main ("Frankfurt on the River Main") and is needed to distinguish it from Frankfurt (Oder) on the River Oder in Brandenburg, which has its own railway station.

== History ==
=== Initial situation ===
Station sign – Frankfurt – International Trade Fair City

Before the current Hauptbahnhof was built on the Galgenfeld (gallows field), the three western stations, the termini of the Taunus Railway (Taunusbahn), the Main–Weser Railway (Main-Weser-Bahn) and the Main-Neckar Railway (Main-Neckar-Bahn) were located on the outskirts of the city, the Gallusanlage, the area of today's Bahnhofsviertel ("station district").

=== Plans ===
Due to the increased volume of travellers at the end of the 19th century, the capacity of the three western railway stations became increasingly inadequate, but changes were made more difficult by the territorial affiliations of the states surrounding the Free City of Frankfurt. After the annexation of Frankfurt, Nassau and Hesse-Kassel by Prussia in 1866, these obstacles were largely removed, so that planning for a central station was taken seriously. The inadequacy of the situation became apparent particularly during the Franco-Prussian War of 1870/71, when troop movements were noticeably hampered by the scattered stations. Like the three western stations before it, the new station was to be built as a terminal station. First, a large station with 34 platform tracks was planned. Because of the huge dimensions, however, a variant with "only" 18 platform tracks was used. Mail and goods handling was to take place under the station hall, local traffic was to be handled outside, which was realised by the main freight yard built later. The town council, which only got a say in 1875, also wanted the railway facilities relocated from the Anlagenring (the ring of roads and parklands on the demolished walls surrounding the inner city) to the former gallows field. A new district with Kaiserstraße as the main axis was to be created on the area of the track fields of the Western stations that would become available after railway operations ceased. This option also had the great advantage that operations could be carried out largely undisturbed during the construction phase, since the new station hardly affected the old lines.

From 1880, the Bauakademie (Prussian Building Academy) held a competition involving all the major architects to design a "monument that challenged the highest artistic standards". In 1881, the winner of this architectural competition was that of the agricultural inspector and university master builder Hermann Eggert from Strasbourg in Alsace, from among the 55 designs submitted. He was commissioned with the planning and construction of the entrance building. The Berlin architect Johann Wilhelm Schwedler, who specialised in steel construction, scored second place. He became the designer of the three new station halls made of iron with a 28-metre (91 ft 10 in)-high barrel vault, each of which had three platforms with six tracks.

=== Realisation ===
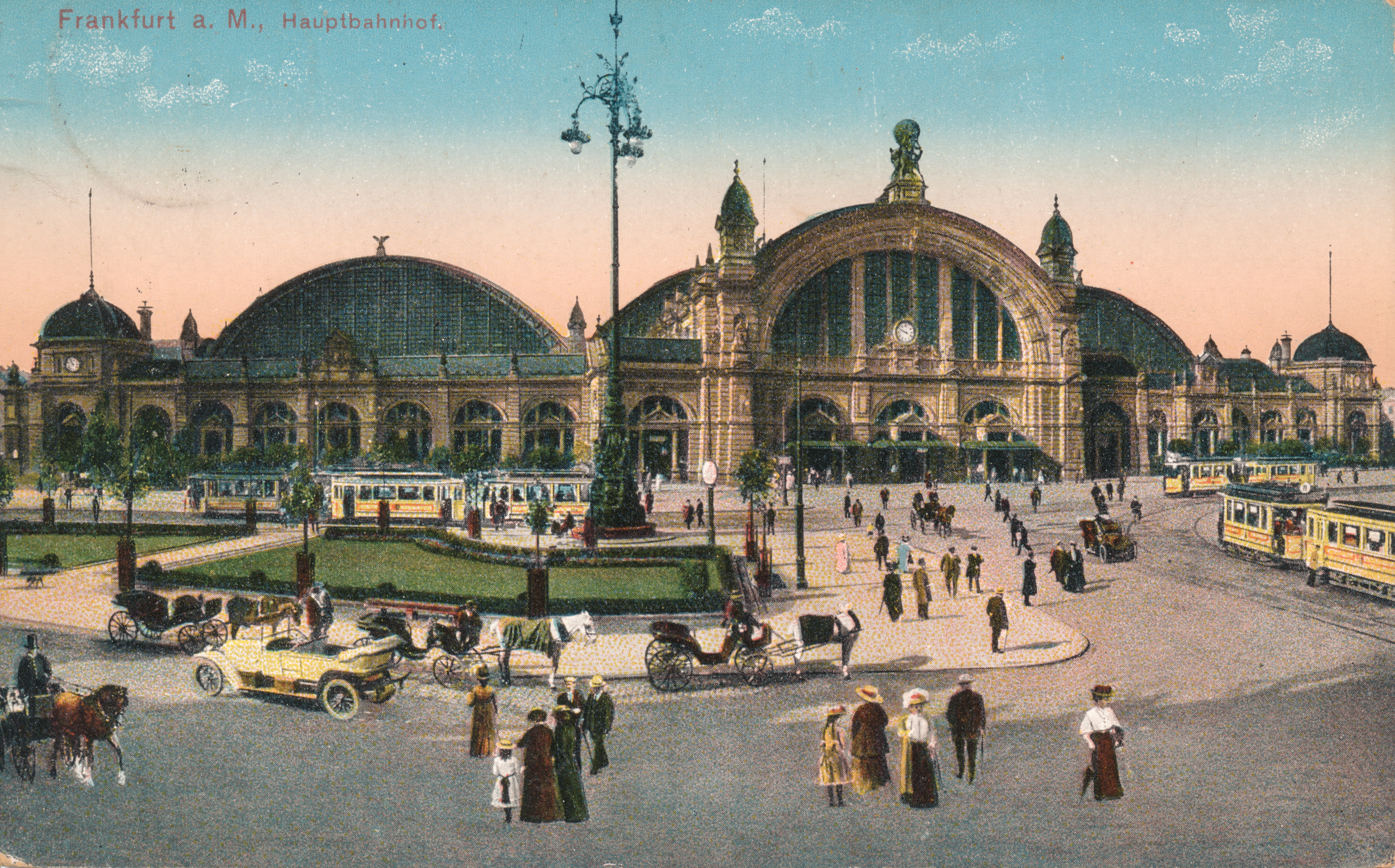
A postcard image of the Hauptbahnhof, c. 1912

On 18 August 1888, after five years of construction, the Centralbahnhof Frankfurt (Frankfurt Central Station) was inaugurated. In the next few years, the station district developed to the east of the entrance building and was fully developed by around 1900. Frankfurt Hauptbahnhof was the largest station in Europe until Leipzig Hauptbahnhof was built in 1915.

=== Railway operations ===
The station was designed for regular services. The entry and exit tracks of each line lay next to each other.

On the evening of the opening day, a train was unable to stop in time and ran over the buffer stop. The locomotive and the pavement of the transverse platform were damaged. This was the beginning of a whole series of such incidents, which caused some ridicule in the press. The "highlight" was the "sweeping" crossing of the locomotive of the Ostend-Wien-Express on 6 December 1901. The locomotive and tender only came to a stop near the first and second class waiting room.

Many engine drivers therefore drove very carefully into the station and came to a stop some distance from the buffer stops. This in turn meant that the last carriages of the trains came to a stop away from the platforms, which the management did not like either. The engine drivers were warned to "drive as close as possible to the buffer stops".

=== Extensions and conversions ===
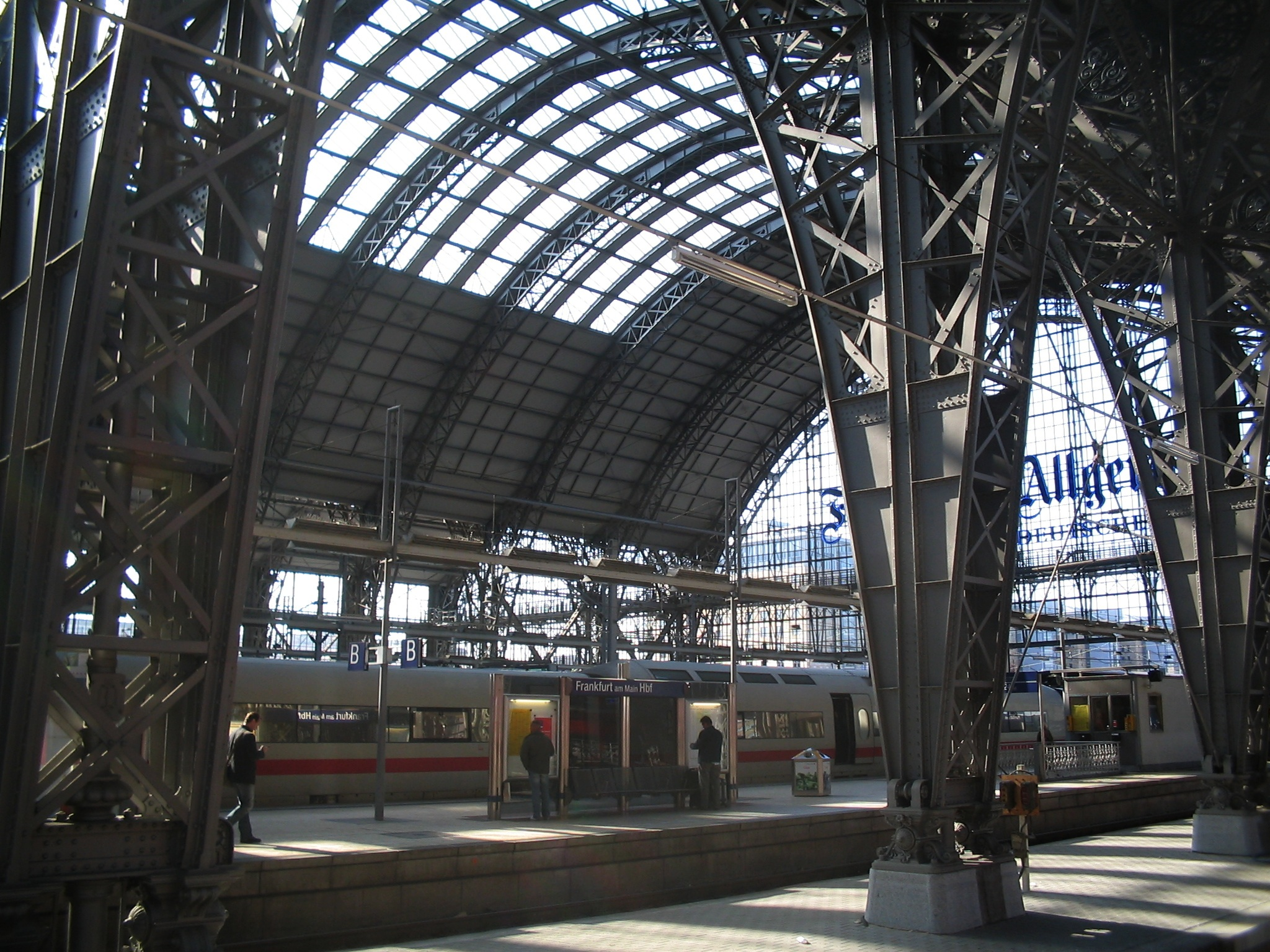
View through the platform hall of the station

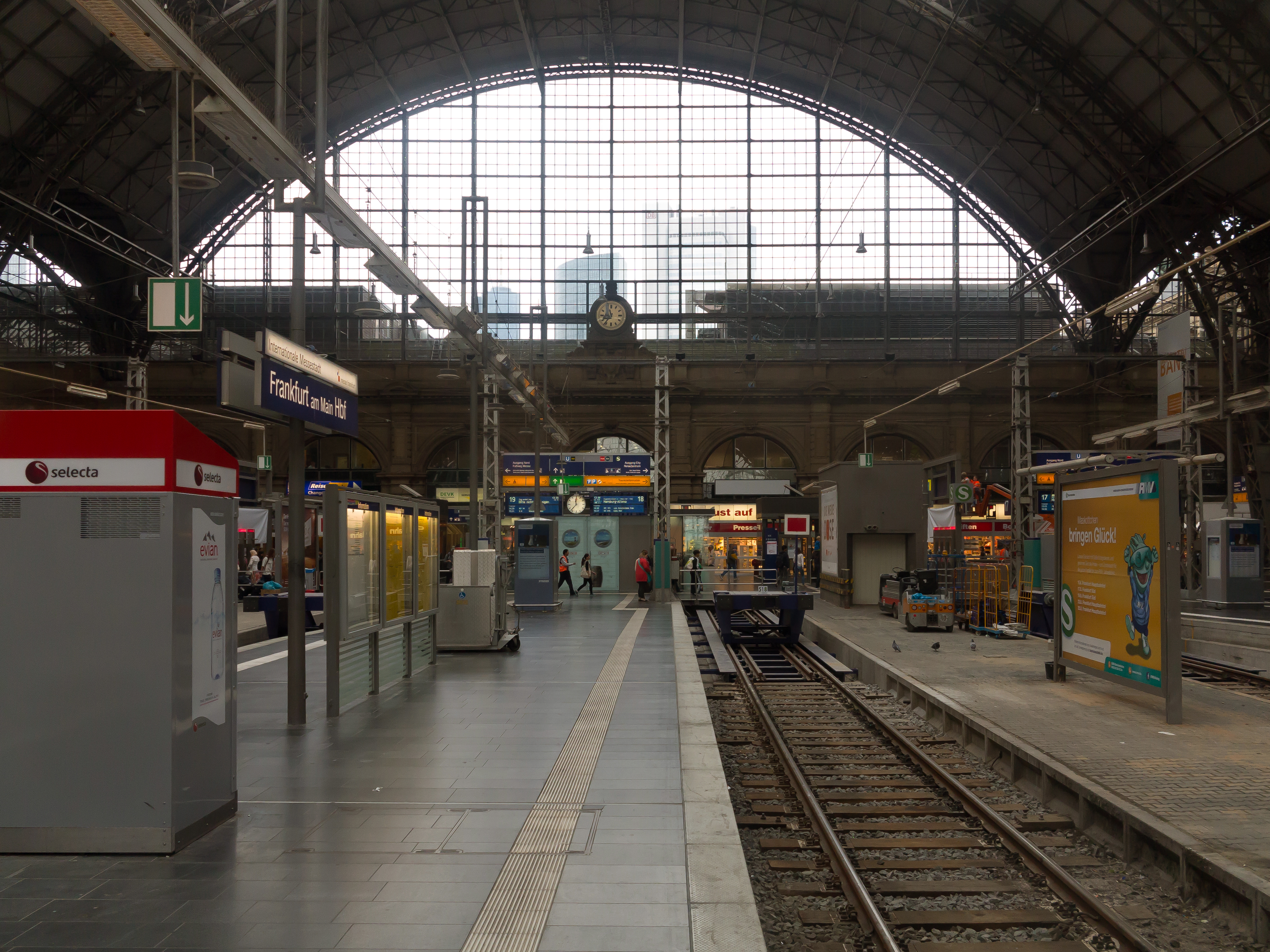
Railway station platform 18

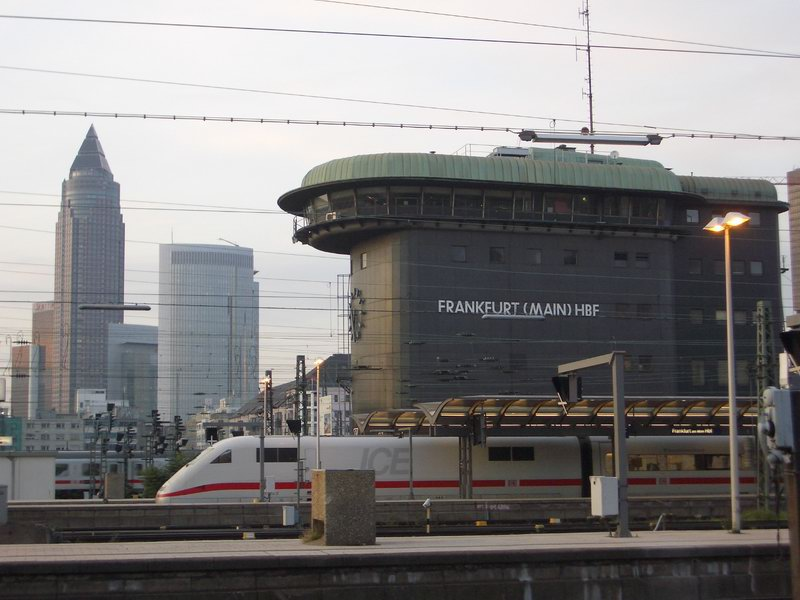
The 1957 signal box

In 1924 the building was extended with two outer halls in Neoclassical style. The number of tracks increased to 25 (tracks 1 to 24 and 1a). Reliefs with motifs of the Wandervogel movement were installed at the southern entrance.

During the Second World War, the station was the target of Allied air raids, for instance on 11 December 1944, when almost 1000 tons of multi-purpose bombs were dropped on the station. However, it had already been damaged by air raids on Frankfurt am Main. Above all, the glazing of the platform halls was destroyed. In order to protect the passengers from rain, the former glass surfaces were partly closed with wood, a temporary solution that remained in place for almost 60 years. Offices that did not necessarily have to be on site for operational purposes were outsourced, the lost and found office for example to the Frankfurt-Höchst station.

The station was fully electrified in 1956.

A 22 meter high signal box tower was built between 1955 and 1957. In 1957, what was then the largest and most modern track signal box in Europe (with a train number signalling system) was put into operation. 16 operators controlled the 15,000 relay system. The building erected near tracks 9 and 10 is now a listed building.

Also in 1957, nine steam shunting locomotives were replaced by seven diesel shunting locomotives. In the early 1960s, Germany's largest express freight handling facility was set up under the station. 15 million pieces of luggage and express goods alone were handled annually in these years. The facilities also included a supply centre for the station and the dining cars, with its own confectionery, large bakery and butcher's shop. Two railway post offices were also part of the extensive facilities, as were 70 freight lifts.

As a result of growing inner-city traffic congestion, the idea of an inner-city connecting railway was taken up again in the 1960s, despite the fact that it was not economically justifiable.

The construction of the underground railway systems began in 1971 with the B-Tunnel of the Frankfurt U-Bahn in the central city. A large shopping arcade (B level) was created as a distribution level, from which two four-track stations each—an underground station (C level) and an S-Bahn station (D level)—and a three-storey underground car park (part of which can also be used as a fallout shelter), is accessed through numerous corridors and stairs. These were the first public escalators in the city at the time. The tram stop on the square in front of the station, Am Hauptbahnhof, could formerly only be reached from the escalator opened in 1978 on the B level. There is now a pedestrian crossing at street level.

The underground stations were built using "cut and cover" construction: for the construction of the S-Bahn station below the long-distance train hall, the north wing of the entrance building was removed from 12 January 1972 and later rebuilt using the original facade cladding. The underground stations began operating in 1978.

At the same time, a two-storey air raid shelter was built to offer railway employees protection in an emergency. All telephone operations could be handled from this bunker. It was also possible to operate the loudspeaker system. Even though stocks such as canned food are no longer stored today, the technical systems (air filter systems, power generators) are still fully operational.

In the early 1970s, the platform ticket requirement was abolished and the platform barriers were dismantled.

The two platforms on tracks 6 to 9 were widened, raised and lengthened for the introduction of ICE operations in June 1991. The space for the widening was gained by demolishing the baggage platforms, which were no longer used.

From 2002 to 2006, the listed roofs of the five platform halls were completely renewed during operation, taking into account heritage preservation issues. A total of around 60,000 square metres (650,000 sq ft) of roof and wall cladding, including around 30,000 square metres (320,000 sq ft) of glass, were renewed and 5,000 tons of steel replaced. A special routine was developed as an assembly concept for this basic repair. At a height of ten meters, an assembly and transport platform was drawn in over the length of the roof for the duration of the construction work. Tower cranes were installed in the central area of this platform. Some loads of up to 150 tons per support were lowered to the basement and foundations were built there. All work steps were integrated in the routine in such a way that the platforms were moved by one field (9.3-metre (30 ft 6 in)) per hall every two weeks. Since then, screw connections instead of rivets have served as the means of fastening, although a specially developed rivet head screw was approved in individual cases by the Federal Railway Authority. The refurbishment of the station roof has allowed significantly more daylight to enter. The trusses that support the roof were painted light gray as in the original condition and therefore appear lighter. The decorative rosettes in the gussets are now painted dark blue and are more easily seen. The entire construction process took place almost unnoticed ten metres above the heads of the travellers.

An incident occurred shortly after work began. During welding work, part of the roof of the northern part of the station building caught fire. The "North Ventilation Centre" was almost completely destroyed and had to be replaced. Since air continued to be sucked in during the fire, dirt and damage also occurred inside the building, especially on level B.

A total of €117m was invested in the roof renovation. 80 percent of the costs were borne by the federal government. The facade was renovated in 2013.

Other parts of the interior design of the station and entrance halls as well as the underground station were also modernised. In the meantime, liquid-crystal displays have replaced the old split-flap displays on the platforms. As in Wiesbaden Hauptbahnhof, seven cubic glass and steel pavilions have replaced the previous buildings on the transverse platform. In mid-2006, cubic and transparent lifts were also installed to connect the S-Bahn platforms to the U-Bahn and to the side platform of the train shed.

Due to the frequent theft of luggage trolleys, which caused annual damage of up to €30,000, a security system was installed in the station to prevent the luggage trolleys from being removed from the railway premises. When crossing a red mark, the front wheel locked. This system was originally developed for shopping carts and adapted accordingly. The rental of luggage trolleys was later discontinued, and in view of the increased number of passengers, there was no longer any room for safe operation.

Planning began in 1998, and implementation at the end of 2001, of a computer-based interlocking of the SIMIS C type, the four-stage commissioning of which was completed on 27 November 2005. It replaces the track control signal box from 1957, which handled a total of around 20 million trains and 100 million shunting trips. The "Fpf" signal box located between tracks 9 and 10 was considered the largest and most modern signal box in Europe at the time it was commissioned. Since 27 March 1986, circuit changes at the signal box had been prohibited due to age-related signs of wear, the stress on the system and the insulation of the interior wiring. The new signal box is divided into two sub-centres (north and south) and was the largest two-storey signal box building in Germany when it was commissioned.

The entry and exit speeds were increased from 30 km/h (18.6 mph) to 40 to 60 km/h (24.9 to 37.3 mph) and new running options were created with additional points. A platform changeover was introduced on all access routes, and 13 platform tracks of the main station were also divided into two sections (with train detection signals). The system comprises a total of 845 control units, including 340 switches and track closures as well as 67 main signals. The interlocking is now remotely operated from the operations centre in Frankfurt by six dispatchers and a node dispatcher. €132m was spent on the signal box.

The new interlocking laid the foundation for numerous extensions and conversions of the tracks of the station and the lines leading to it, in order to better utilise the station platform tracks in the future and to increase their capacity.

The wayfinding system was renewed in November 2005 in preparation for the 2006 World Cup. Replacing of the partly outdated signage made a quick and easy orientation within the station possible.

Finishing in 2007, the floors and the cladding of the stairs, which had not been renewed for decades, were uniformly covered with black granite from China. Following this, a redesign of the station forecourt, the B level and the S-Bahn station is planned.

From July to September 2010, platform 12/13 was removed and rebuilt. The platform cover was separated from the substructure with concrete saws, demolished in sections and rebuilt in prefabricated concrete sections. The new platform was given the same granite flooring as the transverse platform and the main platforms. The part outside the hall will be provided with a new, 130-metre (426 ft 6 in)-long platform roof. Overall, the platform renovation cost €8.5m.

In October 2020, the conversion of the B level and the entrance hall began, which will be completely redesigned within eight years. The federal government, DB, the city and the Frankfurt public transport company (Verkehrsgesellschaft Frankfurt) are investing a total of €375m. By the end of 2024, the entrance hall is to be renovated first, followed by the forecourt.

=== Other upgrades ===
The capacity of some access routes is considered to be exhausted. Several lines (e.g. ICE 13 and RB 58) can no longer be routed via the station. For reasons of acceleration, only four platform tracks (tracks 6 to 9) are normally used for long-distance trains on the north-south axis.

In order to mitigate a number of traffic disadvantages of terminal stations in general and the Frankfurt railway junction in particular, ideas and suggestions have been discussed again and again since the Frankfurt Hauptbahnhof was commissioned to mitigate the disadvantages or to relocate the station as a whole. These proposals were discarded due to technical problems and lack of economic viability.

Various options for underground through stations were discussed in the 1980s and 1990s. The Frankfurt 21 concept that emerged from this provided for the conversion of the station into a twelve-track through station. The project presented in 1996 was shelved in 2001 due to a lack of funding. The RheinMain plus project was then pursued.

Deutsche Bahn is planning to separate long-distance and regional traffic from the direction of Mannheim, Mainz and the Cologne–Frankfurt high-speed rail line. Almost all long-distance traffic is to be concentrated on the south side of the station, on platforms 1 to 8, and conflicts between routes are to be reduced. Part of the regional traffic is to be relocated to the north side. Among other things, the construction of a connecting curve known as the Kraftwerkskurve ("power station curve") from Frankfurt South to platform tracks 1 to 3 and the installation of additional sets of points in the apron of the station are planned by 2030. From June 2017 to November 2021, the Homburger embankment was upgraded in two ways. According to an estimate in 2017, the 800-metre-long upgrade would cost €131m, but the costs ultimately amounted to around €180m. The costs were funded by the federal government. Operationally, the line is to be referred to as "Ffm Hbf–Mainzer Landstraße".

By 2019, access from level B and the station forecourt are to be remodelled at a cost of €175m. Between the beginning of 2016 and the beginning of 2019, more than 1,000 square metres of new retail space are to be built for €134.5m. The city is contributing €27.5m. Previously unused basements are to be used for this purpose. On 21 December 2015, Deutsche Bahn and the city of Frankfurt signed a contract to modernise the underground distribution level and to create additional access points. Work was scheduled to begin in the fourth quarter of 2016 and be completed in mid-2020. The city of Frankfurt is contributing €27.5m to the construction costs of €135m.

The planned Frankfurt am Main long-distance railway tunnel is to run from the Offenbach city limits or from the Frankfurt East station to the Niederräd Main bridge. It is intended to relieve the Hauptbahnhof and turn it into an underground through station for many long-distance lines. The project is included as an "urgent need" of the Federal Transport Infrastructure Plan 2030. The results of the feasibility study were presented to the public on 28 June 2021. The construction period is estimated at 10 years after the completion of planning. Construction is expected to start in the 2030s and operations would start in the 2040s. The construction costs are estimated at €3.6b. The upgrade of the node is one of 13 infrastructure projects of the proposed German clock-face timetable (Deutschlandtakt) that, according to the coalition agreement of the red-green-yellow federal government presented in November 2021, are to be "accelerated" and implemented "with high political priority".

== Architecture ==
=== Superstructure ===
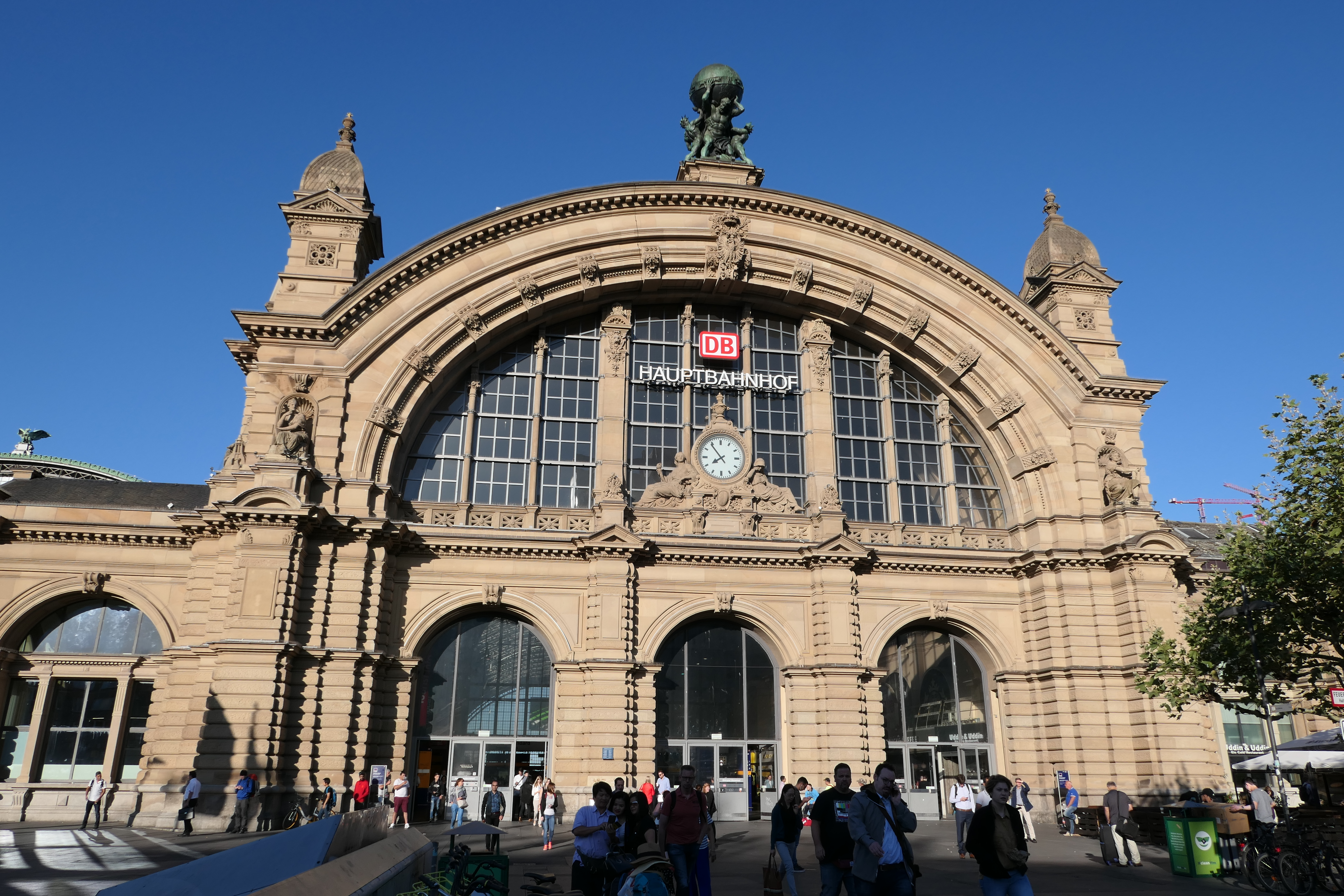
Façade

Inside and outside Frankfurt (Main) Hauptbahnhof in 2014

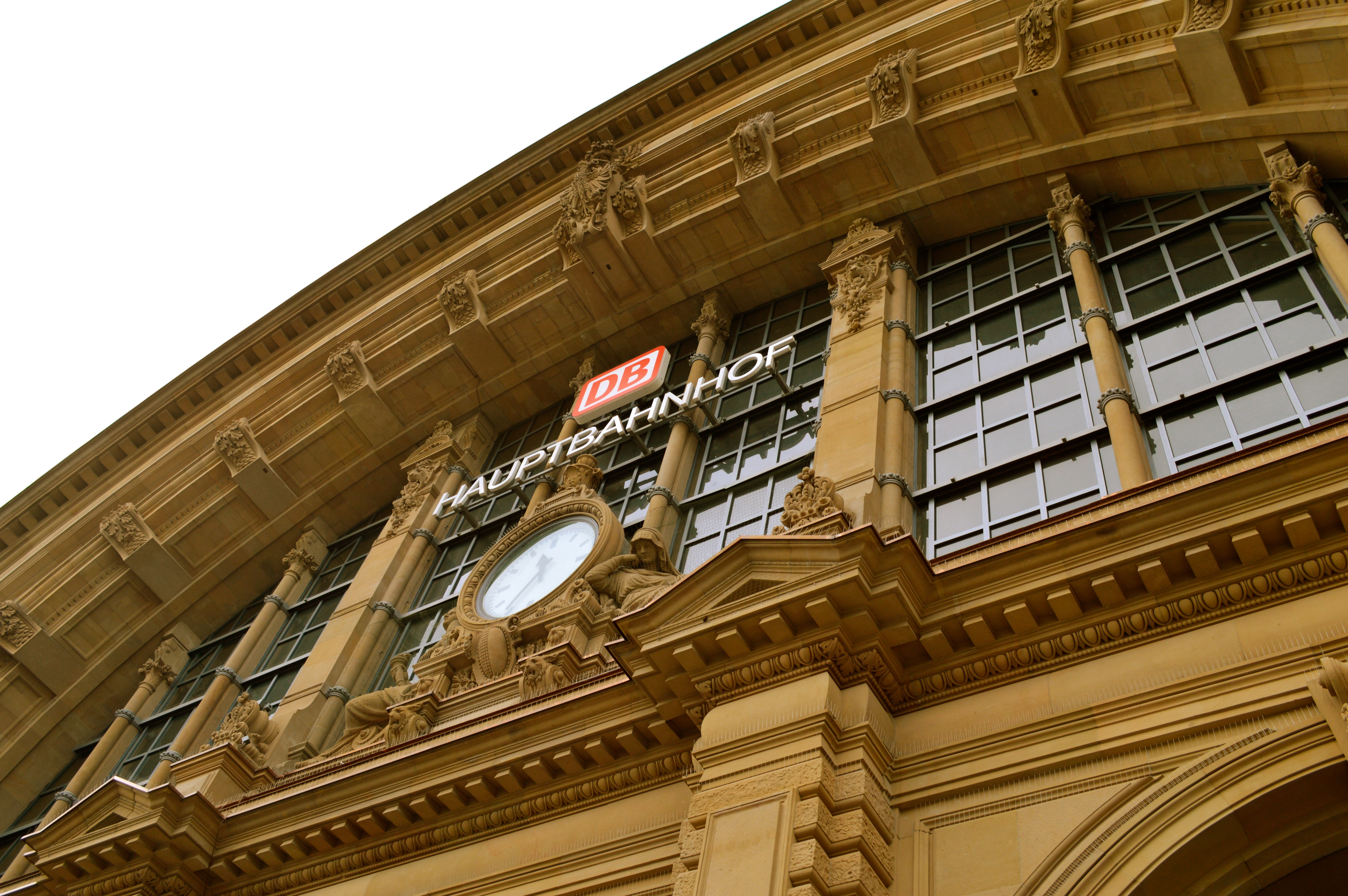
Architectural detail on the front of Frankfurt Am Main Hauptbahnhof

The above-ground part of Frankfurt Hauptbahnhof is divided into the entrance building and the train shed. The entrance building faces on to the street side to the east and thus opens up the terminal station towards the Bahnhofsviertel (station district). The façade of the older building, in front of the three central train sheds, was designed in a Renaissance Revival style, the extensions of the entrance building from 1924, in front of the two outer halls, is in the neoclassical style. The building is 270 metres (885 ft 10 in) wide. The centre of the entrance building is the main reception hall, the street-side entrance of which consists of three doorways divided by two large pillars. Above the centre there is a decorated clock with allegories of day and night and the Deutsche Bahn logo with the word "Hauptbahnhof". The division into three bays is also continued in the roof area, where large glass surfaces let in daylight. The division of the train shed into three parts corresponded to the original use by three railway companies: the Taunus-Eisenbahn, the Prussian state railways and the Hessian Ludwigsbahn. There is a tower on each side of the facade. In the middle of the roof there is a 6.3-metre (20 ft 8 in)-high bronze group of figures by the Braunschweig sculptor Gustav Herold: Atlas, who carries the globe on his shoulders, accompanied by symbolic figures for steam and electricity. There are also figures representing trade and agriculture and the iron industry and shipping.

West of the entrance building is the train shed. It consists of five steel and glass halls that cover the platforms over a length of 186 metres (610 ft 3 in). The three larger halls are 56 metres (183 ft 9 in) wide and 28 metres (91 ft 10 in) high, the two outer small halls are 31 metres (101 ft 8 in) wide and 20 metres (65 ft 7 in) high. The transverse platform, which allows access to the 24 above-ground mainline tracks in the train shed, extends across the entire width of the halls, only the outer track 1a can only be reached indirectly via the platform on track 1. The platforms, which are at right angles to the transverse platform, are also connected by an underpass (transverse tunnel) connected to the west. Outside the platform halls, the platforms continue with canopies from different eras.

== Operational usage ==
The station's terminal layout has posed some unique problems ever since the late 20th century, since all trains have to change directions and reverse out of the station to continue on to their destination. This causes long turn-around times and places the passengers in the opposite direction of where they had been sitting. There have been several attempts to change this. The last project, called Frankfurt 21, was to put the whole station underground, connect it with tunnels also to the east, and so avoid the disadvantages of the terminal layout. This would be financed by selling the air rights over the area now used for tracks as building ground for a skyscraper, but this soon proved unrealistic, and the project was abandoned.

Frankfurt is the third-busiest railway station outside Japan and the second-busiest in Germany after Hamburg Hauptbahnhof.

=== Long-distance services ===
As for long-distance traffic, the station profits greatly from its location in the heart of Europe; 13 of the 24 ICE lines call at the station, as well as 2 of the 3 ICE Sprinter lines. To ease the strain on the Hauptbahnhof, some ICE lines now call at Frankfurt Airport station or at Frankfurt (Main) Süd instead of Hauptbahnhof. In the 2026 timetable, the following long-distance services stop at the station:

Line	Route	Interval
ICE 4 ICE-Sprinter	Hamburg-Altona – Hamburg Dammtor – Hamburg – Hannover – Frankfurt – Frankfurt Airport	one train pair
ICE 11	Berlin Gesundbrunnen – Berlin – Leipzig – Erfurt – Frankfurt – Mannheim – Stuttgart – Augsburg – Munich	every two hours
ICE 12	Berlin Ost – Wolfsburg – Braunschweig – Kassel-Wilhelmshöhe – Frankfurt – Mannheim – Karlsruhe – Freiburg – Basel (– Interlaken Ost)	every two hours
ICE 13	Berlin Ost – Braunschweig – Kassel-Wilhelmshöhe – Frankfurt – Frankfurt Airport	every two hours
ICE 15; ICE-Sprinter	Berlin – Halle – Erfurt – Frankfurt	every two hours
ICE 16; ICE-Sprinter	Berlin – Frankfurt (– Mannheim – Kaiserslautern – Saarbrücken)	at least two train pairs
ICE/ECE 20	Hamburg – Hannover – Kassel-Wilhelmshöhe – Frankfurt – Mannheim – Karlsruhe – Freiburg – Basel – Zürich (– Chur)	every two hours
ICE 22	(Kiel –) Hamburg – Hannover – Kassel-Wilhelmshöhe – Frankfurt – Frankfurt Airport – Mannheim – Stuttgart	every two hours
ICE 24	Westerland (Sylt) – Hamburg – Hanover – Kassel-Wilhelmshöhe – Gießen – Frankfurt	one train pair
ICE 26	Bremen – Hannover – Kassel-Wilhelmshöhe – Gießen – Frankfurt – Darmstadt – Heidelberg – Karlsruhe	every four hours
IC 34	(Münster – Hamm –) Dortmund – Siegen – Siegen – Wetzlar – Bad Nauheim – Frankfurt	some trains
ICE 41	(Dortmund –) Essen – Duisburg – Düsseldorf – Köln Messe/Deutz – Frankfurt Airport – Frankfurt – Aschaffenburg – Würzburg – Nuremberg – Munich	hourly
ICE 49	(Dortmund – Hagen – Wuppertal – Solingen –) Cologne – Siegburg/Bonn – Montabaur – Limburg Süd – Frankfurt Airport – Frankfurt	individual trains (peak hours only)
ICE 50	Dresden – Leipzig – Erfurt – Eisenach – Fulda – Frankfurt – Frankfurt Airport – Wiesbaden	every two hours
ICE 62	Frankfurt – Darmstadt – Heidelberg – Stuttgart – Augsburg – Munich – Salzburg – Villach – Klagenfurt – Graz	2 train pairs
ICE 78	Amsterdam – Arnhem – Duisburg – Düsseldorf – Cologne – Frankfurt Airport – Frankfurt	every two hours
ICE 79	Bruxelles-Midi/Brussel-Zuid – Liège-Guillemins – Aachen – Cologne – Frankfurt Airport – Frankfurt	every two hours
ICE/TGV 82 (ICE/TGV)	Frankfurt – Mannheim (– Kaiserslautern – Saarbrücken) or Karlsruhe – Strasbourg – Paris Est	every two hours
ICE/TGV 84 (TGV)	Frankfurt – Mannheim – Karlsruhe – Baden-Baden – Strasbourg – Mulhouse-Ville – Belfort-Montbéliard – Besançon Franche-Comté – Chalon-sur-Saône – Lyon-Part-Dieu – Avignon – Aix-en-Provence – Marseille-Saint-Charles	one train pair
ECE 85	Frankfurt – Mannheim – Karlsruhe – Baden-Baden – Freiburg – Basel – Olten – Lucerne – Arth-Goldau – Bellinzona – Lugano – Chiasso – Como – Monza – Milan	one train pair
IC 87	Frankfurt – Heidelberg – Stuttgart – Singen – Zürich	individual trains
ICE 91	Dortmund (– Essen – Duisburg – Düsseldorf) or (– Hagen – Wuppertal – Solingen) – Cologne – Bonn – Koblenz – Mainz – Frankfurt Airport – Frankfurt – Würzburg – Nuremberg – Regensburg – Passau – Linz – Vienna	every two hours
RJ 63/66	Frankfurt – Munich – Salzburg – Linz – Vienna – Budapest	on Fri/Sat and Sat/Sun only

=== Local services ===
With regard to regional traffic, Frankfurt Hbf is the main hub in the RMV network, offering connections to Koblenz, Limburg, Kassel, Nidda, Stockheim, Siegen, Fulda, Gießen, Aschaffenburg, Würzburg, Mannheim, Heidelberg, Dieburg, Eberbach, Worms and Saarbrücken with fifteen regional lines calling at the main station. In the 2026 timetable, the following long-distance services stop at the station:

Line	Route	Interval
RE 2	Frankfurt – Frankfurt Airport – Rüsselsheim – Mainz – Bingen (Rhein) – Koblenz	120 min (extra trains to the peak)
RE 3	Frankfurt – Frankfurt Airport – Rüsselsheim – Mainz – Bingen – Koblenz/Bad Kreuznach – Saarbrücken	120 min (extra trains to the peak)
RE 4	Frankfurt – Frankfurt-Höchst – Mainz – Worms – Ludwigshafen – Germersheim – Karlsruhe	120 min
RE 5	Frankfurt – Frankfurt (Main) Süd – Hanau – Fulda – Bebra	Some trains
RE 9	Frankfurt – Frankfurt-Höchst – Mainz-Kastel – Wiesbaden-Biebrich – Wiesbaden-Schierstein – Niederwalluf – Eltville	60 min (only in peak)
RE 13	Frankfurt – Frankfurt Airport – Rüsselsheim – Mainz – Alzey	Some trains in peak
RE 14	Frankfurt – Frankfurt-Höchst – Mainz – Worms – Ludwigshafen Mitte – Mannheim	120 min
RE 20	Frankfurt – Frankfurt-Höchst – Niedernhausen (Taunus) – Limburg (Lahn)	60 min (only in peak)
RE 30	Frankfurt – Friedberg (Hess) – Gießen – Marburg (Lahn) – Treysa – Wabern (Bz Kassel) – Kassel	120 min
RE 50	Frankfurt – Frankfurt South – Offenbach – Hanau – Fulda	60 min (only in peak)
RE 54	Frankfurt – Maintal – Hanau – Aschaffenburg – Würzburg – Bamberg	120 min (with gaps to the peak)
RE 55	Frankfurt – Offenbach – Hanau – Aschaffenburg – Würzburg/– Bamberg	120 min (Frankfurt–Würzburg; additional trains in the peak); individual trains in the peak (Würzburg–Bamberg)
RE 60	Frankfurt – Darmstadt – Bensheim – Weinheim (Bergstr) – Mannheim	60/120 min
RE 70	Frankfurt – Groß Gerau-Dornberg – Riedstadt-Goddelau – Gernsheim – Biblis – Mannheim	60 min
RE 85	Frankfurt – Offenbach – Hanau – Babenhausen – Groß-Umstadt Wiebelsbach (– Erbach (Odenw))	60 min (Frankfurt–Babenhausen); 120 min (Babenhausen–Erbach)
RE 98	Frankfurt – Friedberg – Gießen – Marburg – Treysa – Wabern – Kassel	Some trains between Frankfurt and Gießen in the peak
RE 99	Frankfurt – Friedberg – Gießen – Wetzlar – Dillenburg – Haiger – Siegen	Some trains between Frankfurt and Gießen in the peak
RB 10	Frankfurt – Frankfurt-Höchst – Wiesbaden – Rüdesheim (Rhein) – Koblenz – Neuwied	60 min
RB 12	Frankfurt – Frankfurt-Höchst – Kelkheim – Königstein (Taunus)	30 min
RB 15	Frankfurt – Bad Homburg – Friedrichsdorf – Wehrheim – Neu-Anspach – Usingen – Grävenwiesbach – Brandoberndorf	60 min (only in peak)
RB 22	Frankfurt – Frankfurt-Höchst – Niedernhausen (Taunus) – Limburg (Lahn)	30/60 min
RB 34	Frankfurt – Bad Vilbel – Niederdorfelden – Nidderau – Altenstadt (Hess) – Glauburg-Stockheim	30/60 min
RB 40	Frankfurt – Friedberg (Hess) – Butzbach – Gießen – Wetzlar – Herborn (Dillkr) – Dillenburg	40/80 min
RB 41	Frankfurt – Friedberg (Hess) – Butzbach – Gießen – Marburg (Lahn) – Cölbe – Kirchhain (Bz Kassel) – Stadtallendorf – Neustadt – Treysa	60 min
RB 48	Frankfurt– Friedberg (Hess) – Beienheim – Reichelsheim (Wetterau) – Nidda	some trains in peak
RB 51	Frankfurt – Offenbach (Main) Hbf – Hanau – Langenselbold – Gelnhausen – Wächtersbach (– Bad Soden-Salmünster)	60 min
RB 58	Rüsselsheim Opelwerk – Frankfurt Airport – Frankfurt – Frankfurt South – Frankfurt East – Maintal Ost – Hanau – Aschaffenburg – Laufach	60 min in peak
RB 61	Frankfurt – Dreieich-Buchschlag – Rödermark-Ober Roden – Dieburg	60 min
RB 67	Frankfurt – Darmstadt – Bensheim – Heppenheim (Bergstr) – Weinheim (Bergstr) – Mannheim	60 min
RB 68	Frankfurt – Darmstadt – Bensheim – Heppenheim – Weinheim (Bergstr) – Heidelberg	60 min
RB 82	Frankfurt – Darmstadt Nord – Reinheim (Odenw) – Groß-Umstadt Wiebelsbach – Erbach (– Eberbach)	60 min

The subterranean S-Bahn station is the most important station in the S-Bahn Rhein-Main network, used by all Frankfurt S-Bahn lines, except line S 7, which terminates at the surface station.

Line	Route
S7 (Rhine-Main S-Bahn)	Frankfurt (Main) Hbf – Walldorf (Hess) – Mörfelden – Groß Gerau-Dornberg – Riedstadt-Goddelau

In brief
Total number of tracks:	120
Number of passenger tracks above ground:	25 main tracks, 2 branch); 3 tram stops (2 tracks each)
Below ground:	4 S-Bahn tracks, 4 U-Bahn tracks (3 in use)
Daily trains: (excluding Stadtbahn & tramway)	342 long-distance 290 regional
Passengers (daily):	460,000

=== Other services ===
Tram connections are offered by TraffiQ, with tram lines 11 and 12 (station Hauptbahnhof/Münchener Straße), 14, 16, 17, 20, 21 and the Ebbelwei-Expreß. The lines U4 and U5 call at the subterranean Stadtbahn stop.

Preceding station	Frankfurt U-Bahn	Following station
Festhalle/Messe towards Bockenheimer Warte	U4	Willy-Brandt-Platz towards Enkheim
Terminus	U5	Willy-Brandt-Platz towards Preungesheim

== Future expansion ==
Construction of a railway tunnel with four platforms below the existing station was proposed in 2018 under the project name Fernbahntunnel Frankfurt am Main (Long-distance railway tunnel Frankfurt am Main). As being listed as "urgent need" in the Federal Infrastructure Plan 2030, government funding for the scheme was secured. A study to determine feasibility of construction is expected to be completed by early 2021.

== Crime ==
In 2019, the Federal Police recorded 4,787 crimes at Frankfurt Hauptbahnhof, more than at any other German train station. This included the murder of an eight-year-old boy on 29 July.

== See also ==
- Rail transport in Germany
