= Rüdesheim (Rhein) station =

Railway station in Rüdesheim am Rhein, Germany

Rüdesheim (Rhein)
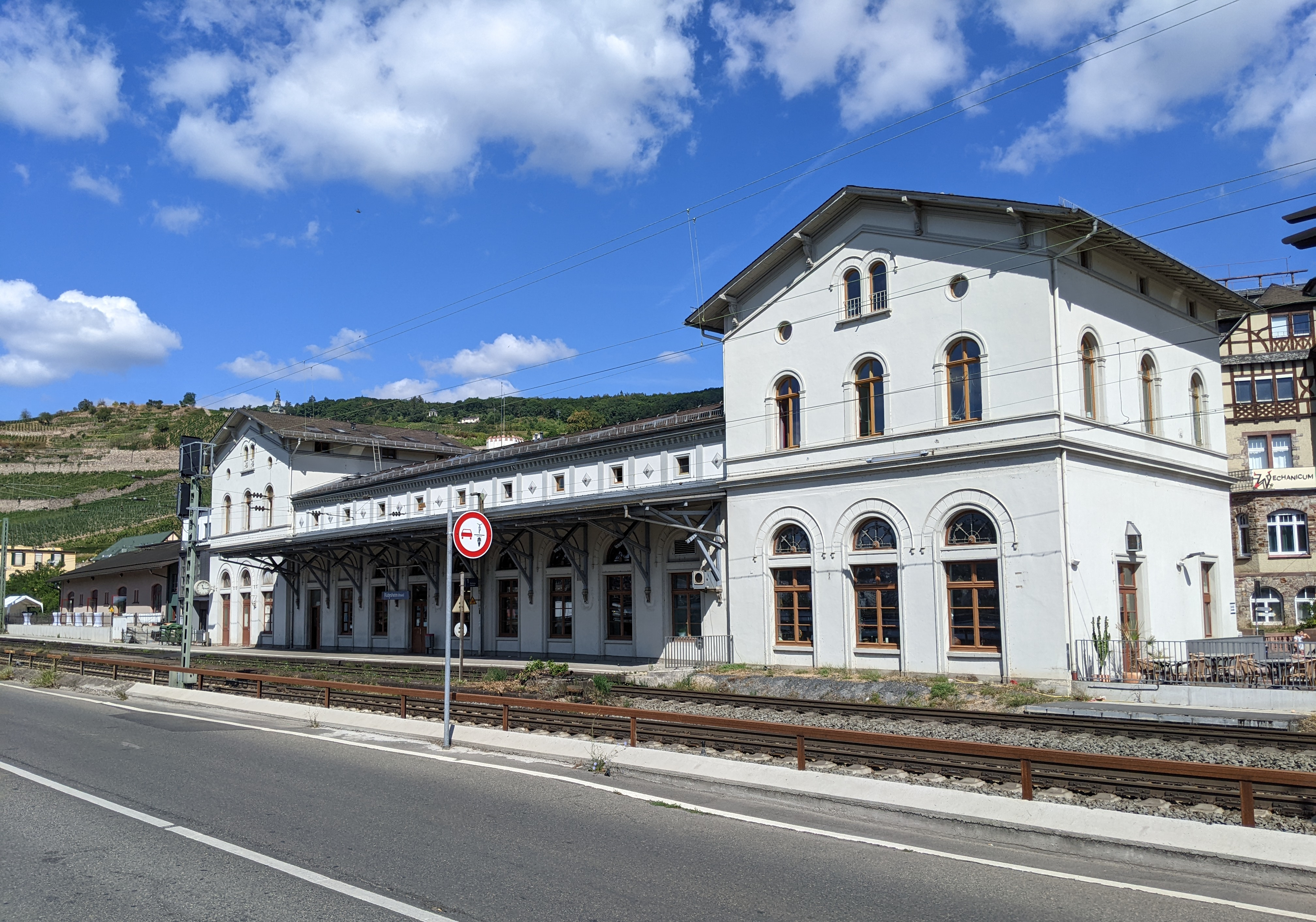

General information
- Location: Am Rottland 1, Rüdesheim am Rhein, Hesse; Germany
- Coordinates: 49°58′37″N 7°54′56″E
- Owner: DB Netz
- Operator: DB Station&Service
- Lines: East Rhine Railway (65.3 km) (KBS 466); Hindenburg Bridge (30.3 km) (1915-1945)
- Platforms: 3

Construction
- Accessible: No
- Architect: Heinrich Velde
- Architectural style: Neoclassical

Other information
- Station code: 5416
- DS100 code: FRDH
- IBNR: 8005213
- Category: 5
- Fare zone: : 6325
- Website: www.bahnhof.de

History
- Opened: 11 August 1856

Services
Preceding station	VIAS	Following station
Assmannshausen towards Neuwied	RB 10	Geisenheim towards Frankfurt (Main) Hbf
Location
- Location within Hesse

Rüdesheim (Rhein) station is in the town of Rüdesheim am Rhein in the German state of Hesse on the East Rhine Railway (German: Rechte Rheinstrecke). It is on the western edge of the town, separated from the Rhine only by federal highway B 42. The entrance building is a double storey stucco building in a neoclassical style. It is now one of the cultural monuments listed in the UNESCO World Heritage Site of the Upper Middle Rhine Valley. The station is classified by Deutsche Bahn as a category 5 station.

== History ==
=== Construction ===
The station was designed by the architect Heinrich Velde of Diez and built in the years 1854–1856, and was opened on 11 August 1856 as the first terminus of the Nassau Rhine Railway (Nassauische Rheinbahn) from Wiesbaden to Rüdesheim. On 22 February 1862, the line was extended to Oberlahnstein and it became a through station.

The entrance building is built in a single style that was prevalent at the time with the entrance hall and function rooms on the ground floor and the stationmaster's accommodation on the first floor above. The stucco facade with a simple series of windows is built in the style of neoclassical architecture that was used for Prussian government buildings. Apart from Rüdesheim, the only buildings built purely in form of this architecture left in the Middle Rhine Valley are at the stations of Oberwesel and Bacharach on the West Rhine Railway.

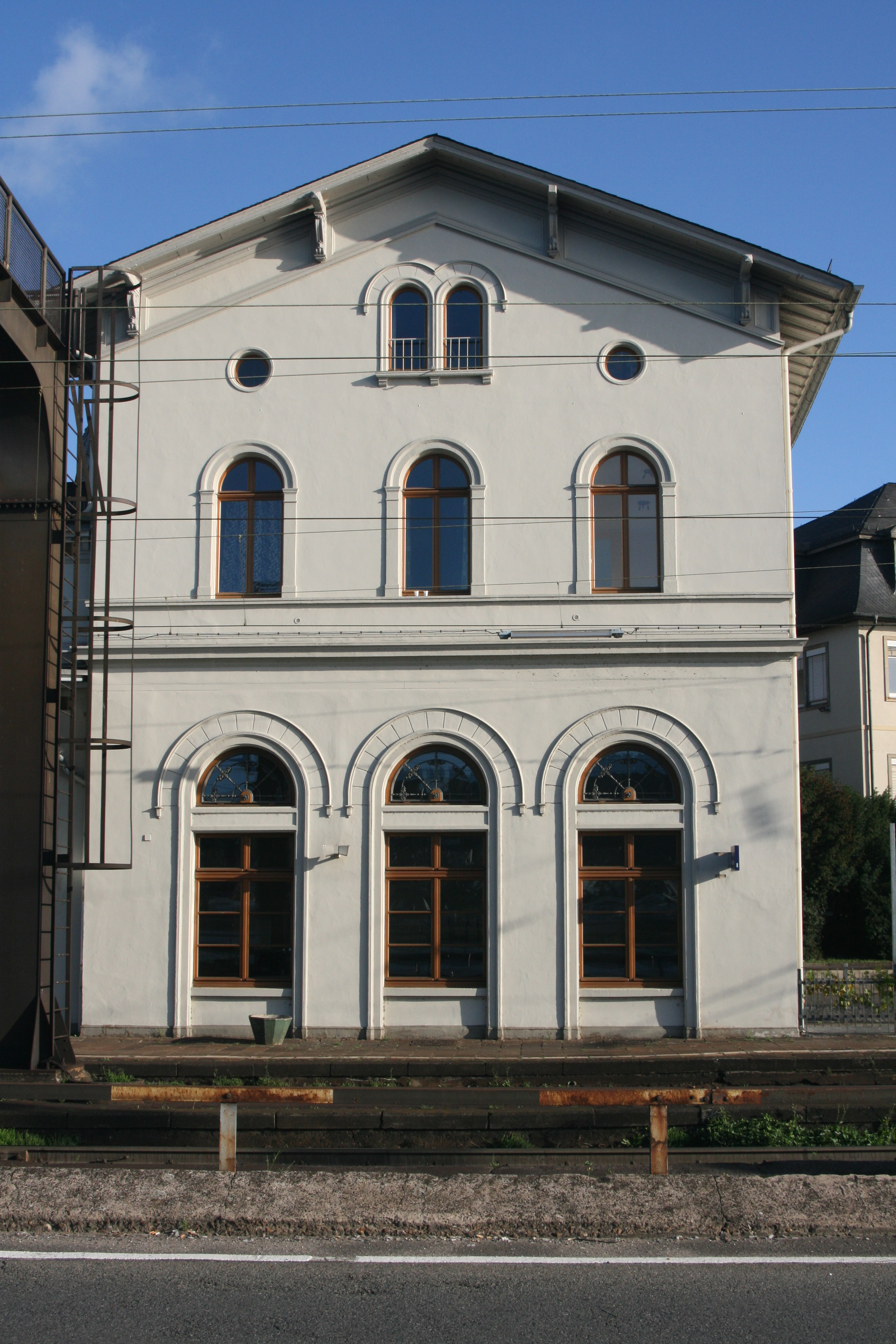
Rüdesheim station

=== Current situation ===
In 2002, the very rundown station buildings were acquired by the Heil brothers of Rüdesheim and completely renovated and refurbished. In addition to the entrance building, the complex includes a freight shed and an office building, all of which are heritage listed. In 2007, its private owners were given a Hessian heritage prize for its exemplary restoration. The station has been restored as the representative entrance building in the city of Rüdesheim, as it was originally built.

By 2028, a new, fully accessible station is to be built about one kilometre east of the current station. After completion, the existing platform facilities at the current station will be dismantled, while the listed entrance building will be preserved.

== Rail services ==
Rüdesheim (Rhein) station is served by the Regionalbahn service RB 10 (RheingauLinie) of the Rhein-Main-Verkehrsverbund (Rhine-Main Transport Association, RMV) operated hourly and, during peak hours, every half-hour.

Line	Line name	Route	Frequency
RB 10	RheingauLinie	Neuwied – Koblenz Stadtmitte – Koblenz Hbf – Rüdesheim – Wiesbaden – Frankfurt (Main)	Hourly
