= Koblenz railway station =

Koblenz railway station may refer to one of several railway stations:

- In the German city of Koblenz
  - Koblenz Hauptbahnhof
  - Koblenz Stadtmitte station
  - Koblenz-Lützel station
  - Koblenz-Ehrenbreitstein station
- In the Swiss town of Koblenz
  - Koblenz railway station (Switzerland)
  - Koblenz Dorf railway station
