= Koblenz-Lützel station =

Railway station in Koblenz, Germany

Koblenz Lützel
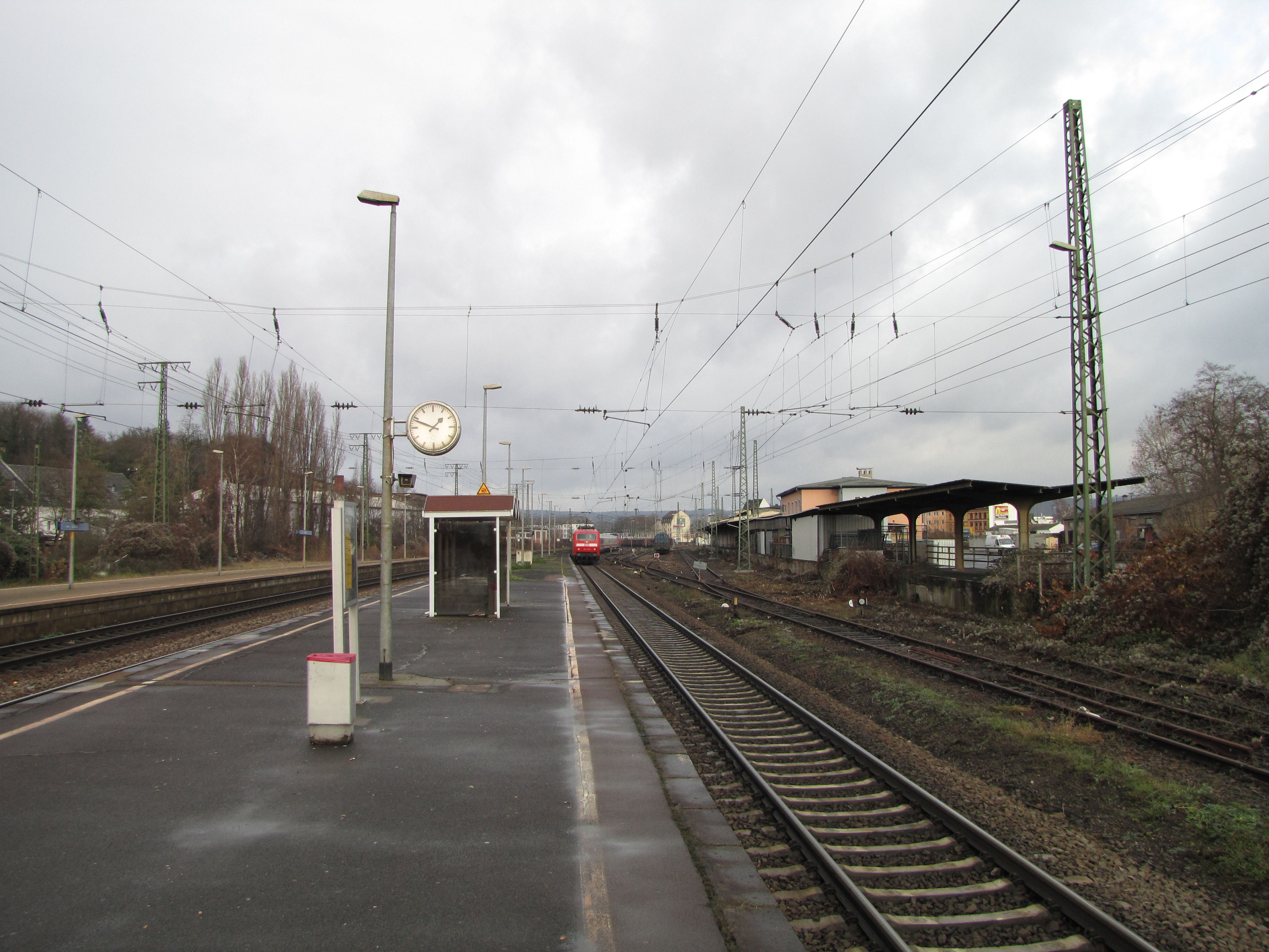

General information
- Location: Am Güterbahnhof 1, Koblenz, Rhineland-Palatinate; Germany
- Coordinates: 50°22′4″N 7°35′30″E
- Owner: Deutsche Bahn
- Operator: DB Netz; DB Station&Service
- Lines: West Rhine Railway (89.4 km) (KBS 470); Neuwied–Koblenz (12.7 km) (KBS 466); Koblenz-Lützel–Mayen Ost (closed)
- Platforms: 4

Construction
- Accessible: No

Other information
- Station code: 3301
- DS100 code: KKOL; KKOLM (Bft Koblenz-Lützel Mitte); KKOLN (Bft Koblenz-Lützel Nord)
- IBNR: 8003352
- Category: 5
- Fare zone: VRM: 193
- Website: www.bahnhof.de

History
- Opened: 1858

Services
Preceding station	DB Regio NRW	Following station
Urmitz Rheinbrücke towards Mönchengladbach Hbf	RE 8	Koblenz-Stadtmitte towards Koblenz Hbf
Preceding station	Trans Regio	Following station
Urmitz towards Köln Messe/Deutz	RB 26	Koblenz-Stadtmitte towards Mainz Hbf
Location
- Location within Rhineland-Palatinate Location within Germany Location within Europe

Koblenz-Lützel station is the oldest still-operating station in the city of Koblenz in the German state of Rhineland-Palatinate. It was built at the same time as the Koblenz Rhenish station (German: Rheinischer Bahnhof), which was abandoned in 1902 with the opening of the Koblenz Central Station (Hautptbahnhof) and destroyed in World War II.

The station is located in the Koblenz suburb of Lützel, near the Moselle river and the Moselle railway bridge. It includes a passenger station and a freight yard. There was also a freight wagon repair shop, which is now closed and is now the site of the DB Museum, Koblenz.

The now dismantled Koblenz-Lützel–Mayen Ost railway branched off the West Rhine Railway (the left bank line, German: Linke Rheinstrecke) in Koblenz-Lützel from 1904 to 2003. The Neuwied–Koblenz railway was built to connect the East Rhine Railway (the right bank line, Rechte Rheinstrecke) to the left bank line and the Moselle line, which is important for freight traffic, at Koblenz-Lützel station.

Koblenz has had three stations in two kilometres on the left bank line with Koblenz-Lützel station, Koblenz Central Station and Koblenz City Centre Station (Koblenz Stadtmitte), completed of in 2011.

== History ==
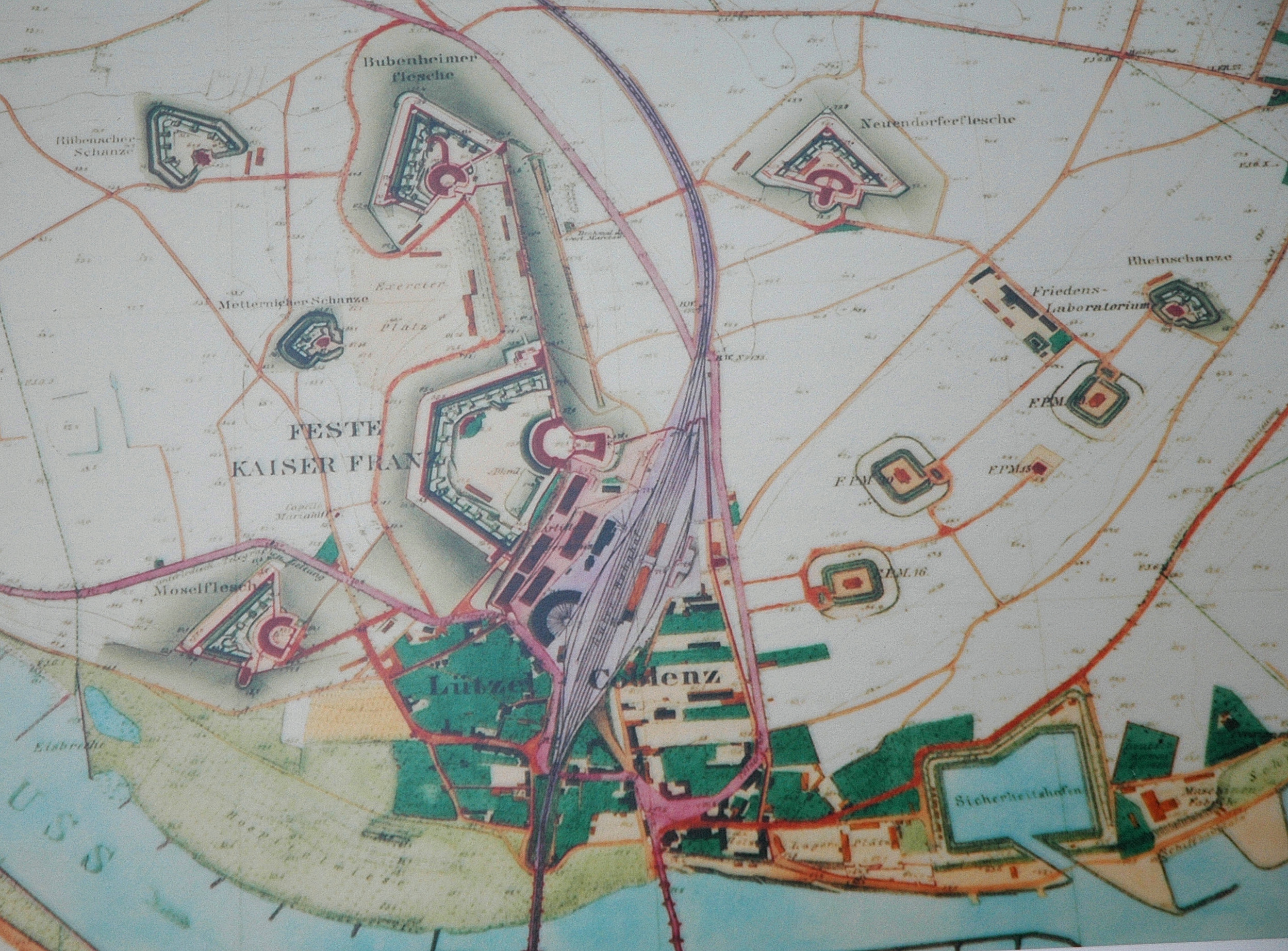
The station within the fortifications of the Kaiser Franz fortress in the 1880s

In 1858, the Bonn–Koblenz section of the West Rhine Railway was completed. The location of the Koblenz station presented difficulties. Two sites had been seriously discussed. One was on the north bank of the Moselle and the other was in the Moselweiser Feld. A decree of the Prince Regent William in April 1858 finally led to the separation of the passenger station and the freight yard. Thus the Rhenish station was built near the current City Centre Station and the Rhenish freight yard was built outside the city limits of Koblenz on the north bank of the Moselle below the Kaiser Franz fortress, where the current Koblenz-Lützel station is located.

Construction began shortly after the announcement of the royal decree in May 1858 and the freight yard was opened in November of that year. The provisional station building was opened in 1859 and the permanent station was probably opened the following year. The entire station area was extensively protected in 1864–66 by crenellated walls. The Moselle railway bridge connected the freight yard to the passenger station on the other bank of the Moselle. The rise of the economically important district of Lützel was the direct result of the construction of the station. In 1889, most of the workforce was employed in the rail system. Company settlements were mainly established between Neuendorferstraße and the freight yard.

In 1900, construction of the Koblenz-Lützel–Mayen Ost railway started and it was opened in 1904. In 1905 the freight yard was expanded and the Koblenz-Lützel railway workshop (Bahnbetriebswerk Koblenz-Lützel) was built. Freight wagons were repaired in a shed that still exists and freight locomotives were parked in the adjacent roundhouse with twin turntables.

In 1918, the Prussian state railways opened the Crown Prince William bridge (Kronprinz-Wilhelm-Brücke), completing the Neuwied–Koblenz railway. This provided a link to north of Koblenz between the left and right bank lines in addition to the Horchheim Railway Bridge in southern Koblenz.

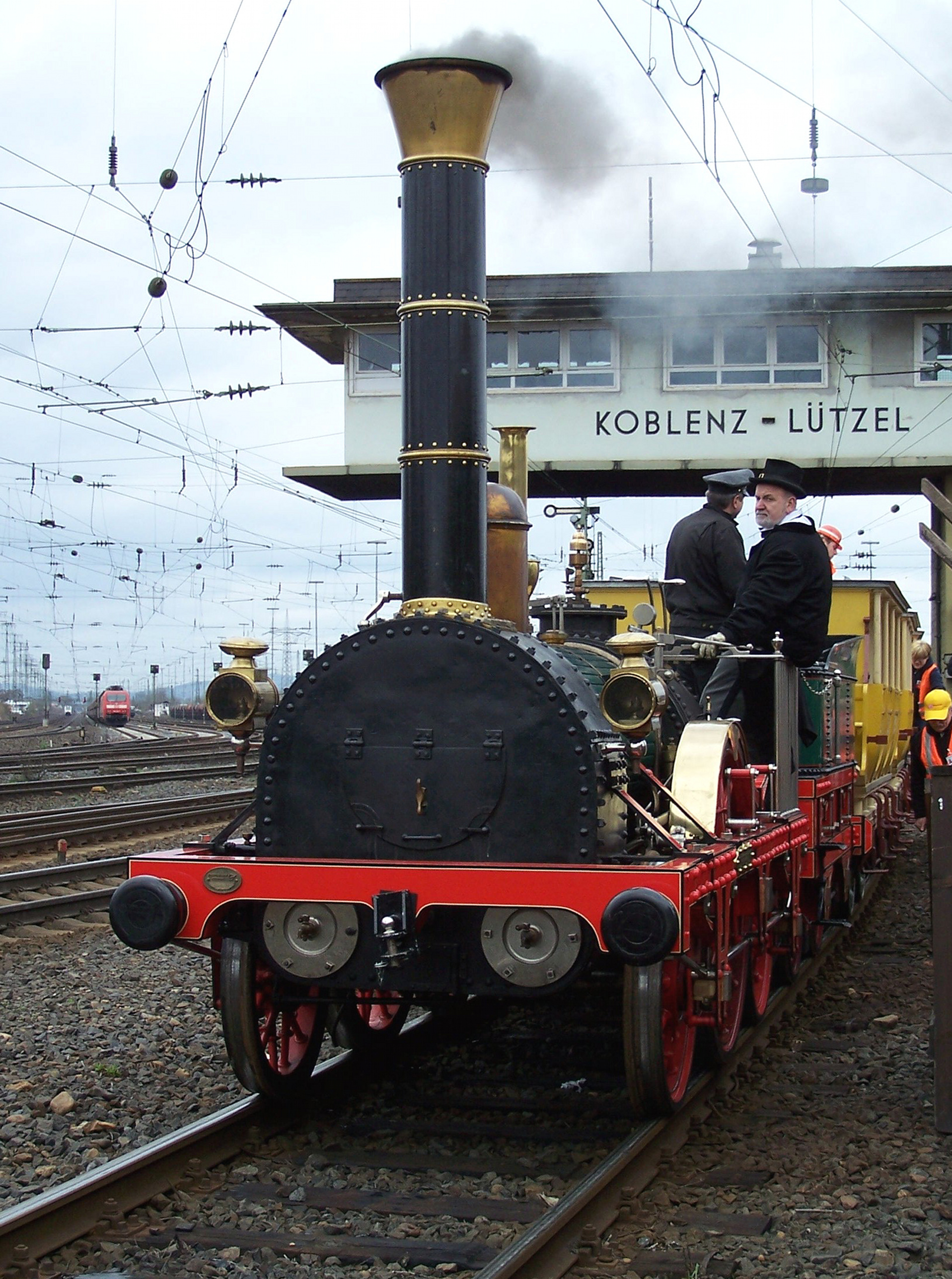
Replica of the first steam locomotive in Germany, the Adler, in the DB Museum

In the Third Reich the first large-scale deportations from the metropolitan area of Koblenz were carried out through the freight yard. In 1942, 870 Jews were deported from Lützel to Cologne and from there dispatched to labour and concentration camps. Lützel station was destroyed during air raids in 1944. German troops destroyed all the bridges in Koblenz during their retreat in 1945, including the Crown Prince William and the Moselle (Lützel) railway bridges, which were very important for the station. In the same year the Lützel railway bridge was temporarily repaired by the Americans. Koblenz-Lützel station was also rebuilt. It was not until 1954 that the Urmitz railway bridge was rebuilt with a single track, replacing the Prince William bridge. On 22 September 1962, the double-track, electrified and upgraded Neuwied–Koblenz railway was opened to traffic.

In 1968, the railway workshop was abandoned and dismantled in several stages. Since the early 1980s, the roundhouse and other parts of the train depot have been demolished.

Freight wagons were repaired in the hall of the wagon depot until 1995. In 2001, the DB Museum, Koblenz, a remote site of the Nuremberg Transport Museum, transferred an exhibition of old locomotives and trains to this hall and at the station tracks. The Koblenz-Lützel–Mayen Ost railway was closed in 2003 and partially dismantled.

== Passenger services ==
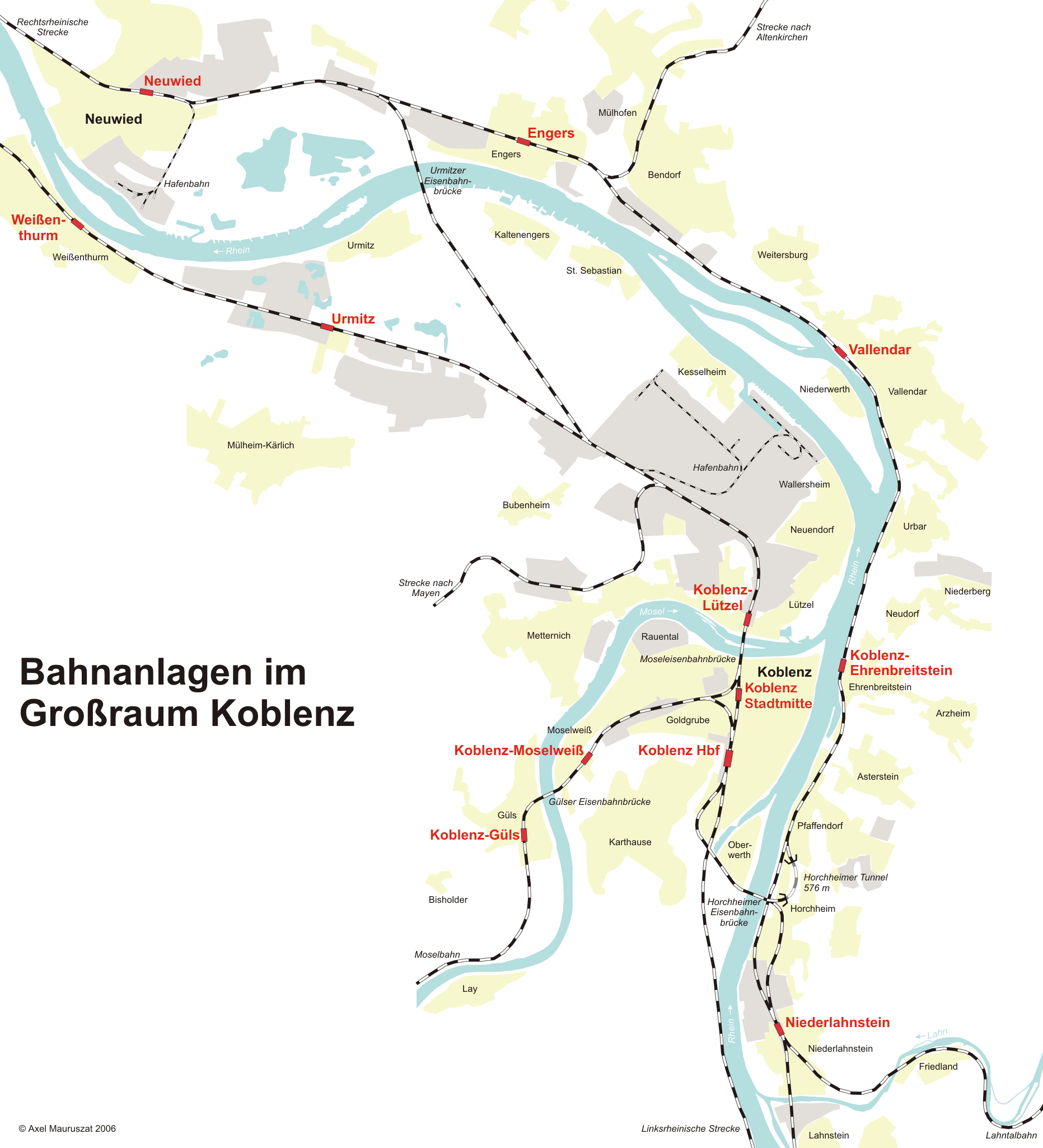
Map of railways in greater Koblenz

Koblenz-Lützel station has two 76 cm high central platforms, which can be accessed only by stairs, so the station is not accessible for the disabled. Access to the platforms is from the east side of Am Güterbahnhof, a dead-end and run-down street.

The eastern platform is located on the West Rhine line and is served by MittelrheinBahn (RB 26) services, all other services on the left bank line pass through without stopping. The western platform is located on the Neuwied–Koblenz railway and is served by the Rhein-Erft-Bahn (RB 27); however, the extended RheingauLinie (RB 10) runs between Koblenz City Centre Station and Neuwied without stopping.

Line	Timetable no	Route	Operator	Frequency
RE 8 Rhein-Erft-Express	465 East Rhine Railway	Mönchengladbach – Cologne – Porz – Troisdorf – Bonn-Beuel – Bad Honnef – Neuwied – Koblenz-Lützel – Koblenz	DB Regio NRW	Hourly
RB 26 MittelrheinBahn	470 West Rhine Railway	Köln Messe/Deutz – Cologne Hbf – Bonn – Koblenz-Lützel – Koblenz – Mainz	trans regio	Hourly

Near Koblenz-Lützel station there are also bus stops of the Koblenzer Elektrizitätswerk und Verkehrs-AG (Koblenz electric supply and transport company, the municipal utility). These are, however, on Schüllerplatz or Mayener Straße on the western side of the station, which makes changing transport mode more difficult.

=== Freight yard ===
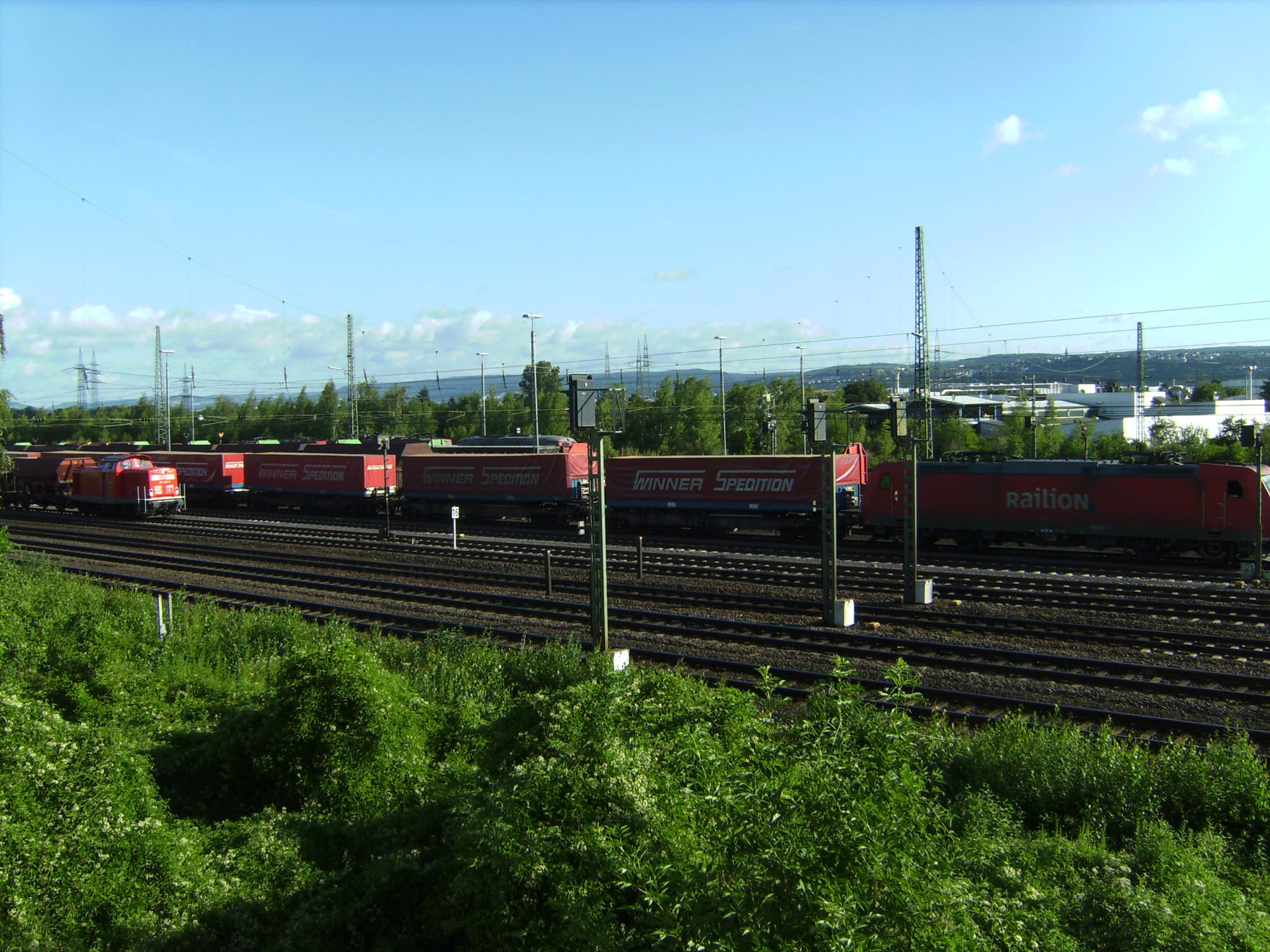
Koblenz-Lützel freight yard

The Koblenz-Lützel freight yard, now part of a tri-modal Koblenz freight distribution centre, was built in 1858. It now consists of four loading tracks and a variety of sidings, now partly used by the DB Museum in Koblenz. There is also at the freight depot a connection to the Rhine port railway, which has 10 km of track connecting Koblenz-Lützel freight yard and the Rhine port and thus connects the waterways of the Rhine and the Moselle to the Deutsche Bahn network.
