= Engers station =

Railway station in Neuwied, Germany

Engers
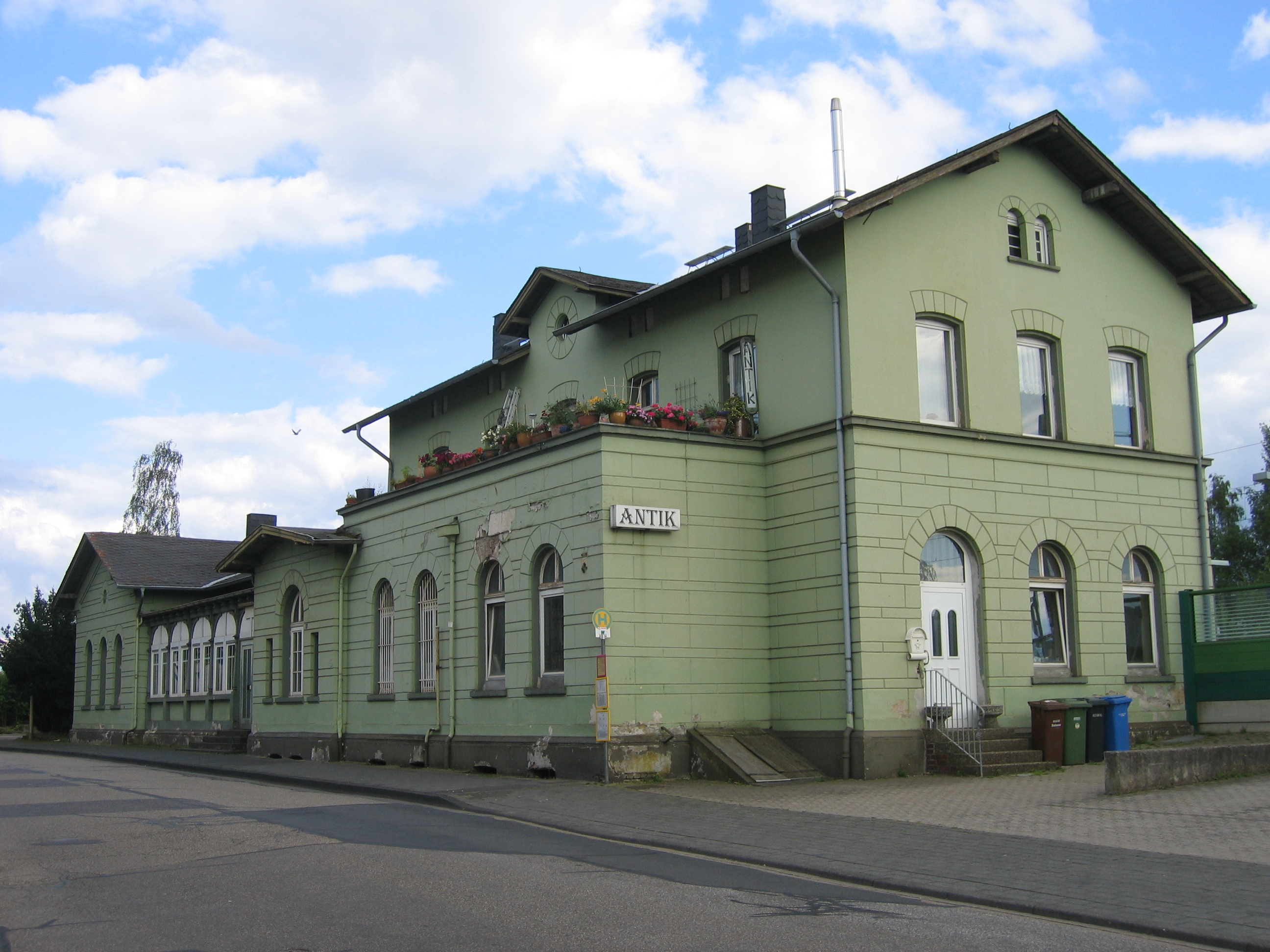
- Engers station

General information
- Location: Mühlhofenstr. 31, Engers, Rhineland-Palatinate; Germany
- Coordinates: 50°25′34″N 7°32′48″E
- Lines: East Rhine Railway (KBS 465); Engers–Au
- Platforms: 2

Construction
- Accessible: No

Other information
- Station code: 2120
- DS100 code: KENR
- IBNR: 8000094
- Category: 5
- Fare zone: VRM: 204; VRS: 2970 (VRM transitional tariff)
- Website: www.bahnhof.de

History
- Opened: 1869

Services
Preceding station	DB Regio NRW	Following station
Neuwied towards Mönchengladbach Hbf	RB 27	Vallendar towards Koblenz Hbf
Location

Engers station is a through station and a former railway junction in the district of Engers in the town of Neuwied in the German state of Rhineland-Palatinate. It is on the East Rhine Railway (German: Rechte Rheinstrecke, Right Rhine line) and was formerly also the beginning of a line to Au (Sieg) and had a large freight yard.

== History ==
The station was built in the 1860s simultaneously with the Right Rhine line from Cologne to Wiesbaden. Its commissioning took place on 27 October 1869, when the Right Rhine line was extended from Niederlahnstein to Neuwied.

Initially, Engers station played only a minor transport role and only had a couple of railway employees. But this changed over the next two decades, initially with the completion of the Right Rhine line and finally in May 1884 with the completion of the Engers–Au railway to the Westerwald. The station thus became a rail transport hub, which also meant that a train depot with a roundhouse was built at the station.

In the late 19th century and well into the 20th century, a major freight yard was developed next to the passenger station, which eventually had a hump for assembling trains, as well as facilities for loading raw materials (including clay and pumice) and agricultural products. In 1912, Engers station, which was then part of the Prussian state railways, sold approximately 150,000 tickets. The track work as well as the hump and the loading facilities still exist for the most part, but are no longer connected to the railway.

In the Second World War, Engers station and the related workshops, together with large parts of the Rhine line, were badly damaged by Allied artillery bombardments in March 1945. The rail service was resumed in August of that year. However, the station increasingly lost its former importance in the postwar period. In 1954 most of the freight and passenger trains on the Right Rhine line diverted over the line to the newly rebuilt Urmitz railway bridge and the freight yard in Engers was abandoned in the 1970s. Finally, the station lost its importance as a junction in 1989 with the closure of the line to the Westerwald.

Due to the plans of the reactivation of the Engers-Au railway upto Siershahn, theres a need to consteuct a turnout again to connect the East Rhine railway to the Engers-Au railway in Engers, since on the former turnout a noise barrier has been consteucted. In November 2026, it was announced that, following the completion of the renovation work on the East Rhine railway, no turnout will initially be installed at Engers station to reconnect the two lines to another. However, provisions will be made within the new electronic signalbox German: elektronisches Stellwerk, short: (ESTW), to allow for a future connection between the two lines at Engers station. Consequently, a new turnout will now need to be installed somewhat further to the north. In addition, the overhead contact lines and signal cables will require adjustments.

== Current operations ==
The old station building still exists, but is no longer used as such, because it has been sold into private ownership. Two platforms are used for passenger operations and are linked by a pedestrian underpass. It is served hourly by the Rhein-Erft-Bahn from Koblenz via Cologne to Mönchengladbach. The station is also served by three bus routes of the Verkehrsverbund Rhein-Mosel (Rhine-Moselle transport association, VRM).

Line	Service	Route	Frequency
RB 27	Rhein-Erft-Bahn	Mönchengladbach – Rheydt – Cologne – Köln/Bonn Flughafen – Troisdorf – Bonn-Beuel – Linz (Rhein) - Neuwied - Engers – Koblenz	Hourly
