= Engers =

Human settlement in Germany

Coordinates: 50°25′47″N 7°34′13″E

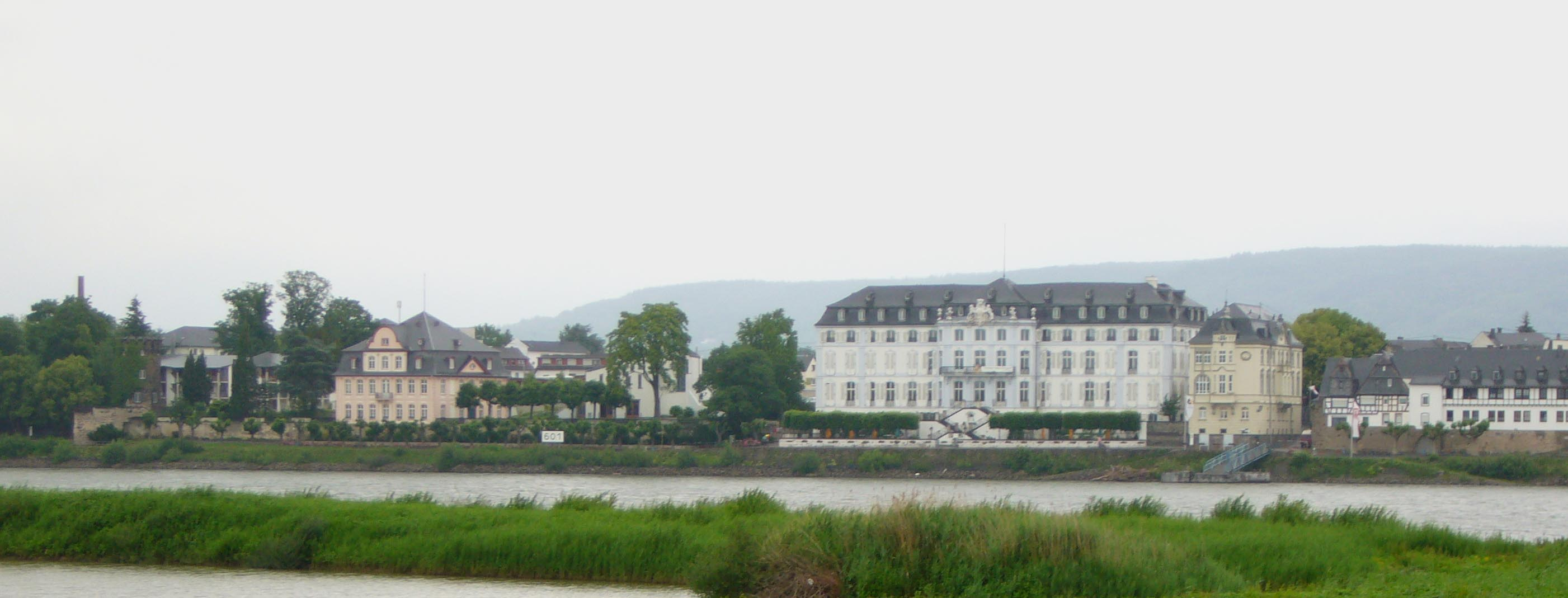
Engers, as seen from the Rhine

former coat of arms

Engers is a district of Neuwied on the right banks of the river Rhine in Germany located next to Koblenz in Rhineland-Palatinate.

Engers has 5,367 inhabitants. It is highwater-endangered by its direct contact with the river Rhine.

== City history ==
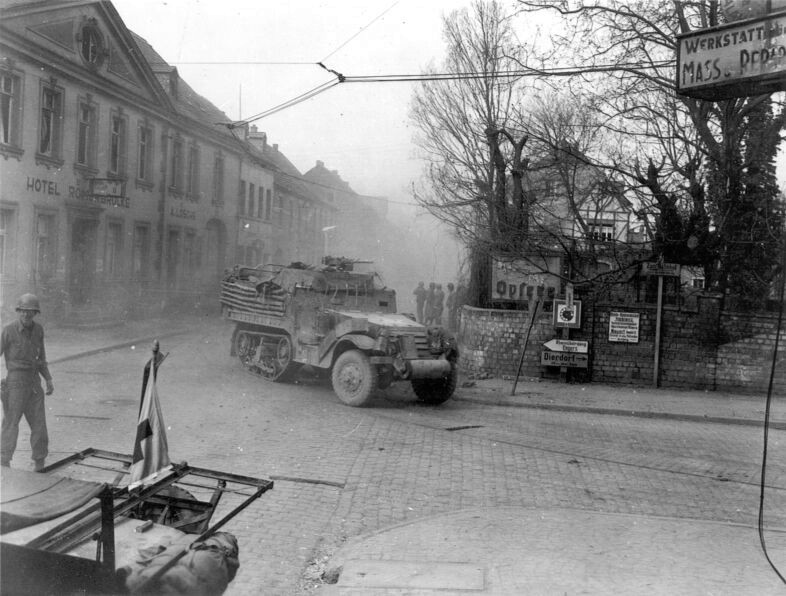
9th Armored Division halftracks advance through Engers March 27, 1945

- The eldest evidences for settlements reach back to 800 - 600BC. A cemetery of the Iron Age was discovered nearby Engers.
- An important historic event was the military activity under Julius Caesar in 55 BC at the town Urmitz with the goal to punish the Germanic Sicambris.
- Around 400 AC a Roman castellum was built. Its ruins can still be seen today.
- In 1357, Engers received market rights by German imperator Charles IV.
- In 1412, Engers received river tax rights, but they were soon given back to Koblenz because of the adverse position of the Rhine-banks at Engers.
- In 1662, the pestilence killed nearly all families of Engers except six of them. Families from the nearby village Reil relocated to Engers afterwards, thus Engers started expanding again.
- In 1938, under the Nazi regime Jewish families were banished from Engers.
- In 1945, the German army destroyed the Engers-Urmitz bridge (formerly named Kronprinz-Wilhelm-Brücke), ignoring fleeing comrads and civilians still crossing the bridge.
- Until 1970, Engers was an independent minor city, but in this year it was forced to become in-municipated as a district of Neuwied. With this act, Engers lost its independence and its city-status.
- In 1995, the Ensemble Villa Musica trust of the Engers-chateau opened its own academy of music. In 2003, the state's academy of music of Mainz, the Hochschule für Musik Mainz, was temporarily relocated to Engers.

== Tourist attractions ==
A well known tourist attractions in the region of Neuwied and Koblenz is Schloss Engers. It was built around 1760 by Archbishop Johann Philipp von Walderdorff, as a summer-residence and hunting lodge. Today it is a popular touristic attraction for its music-events and touristic guidings.

The old city hall (built around 1642) and the princely inn "Schloss-Schenke" (built 1621) are placed directly in front of the Engers chateau.

== Transport ==
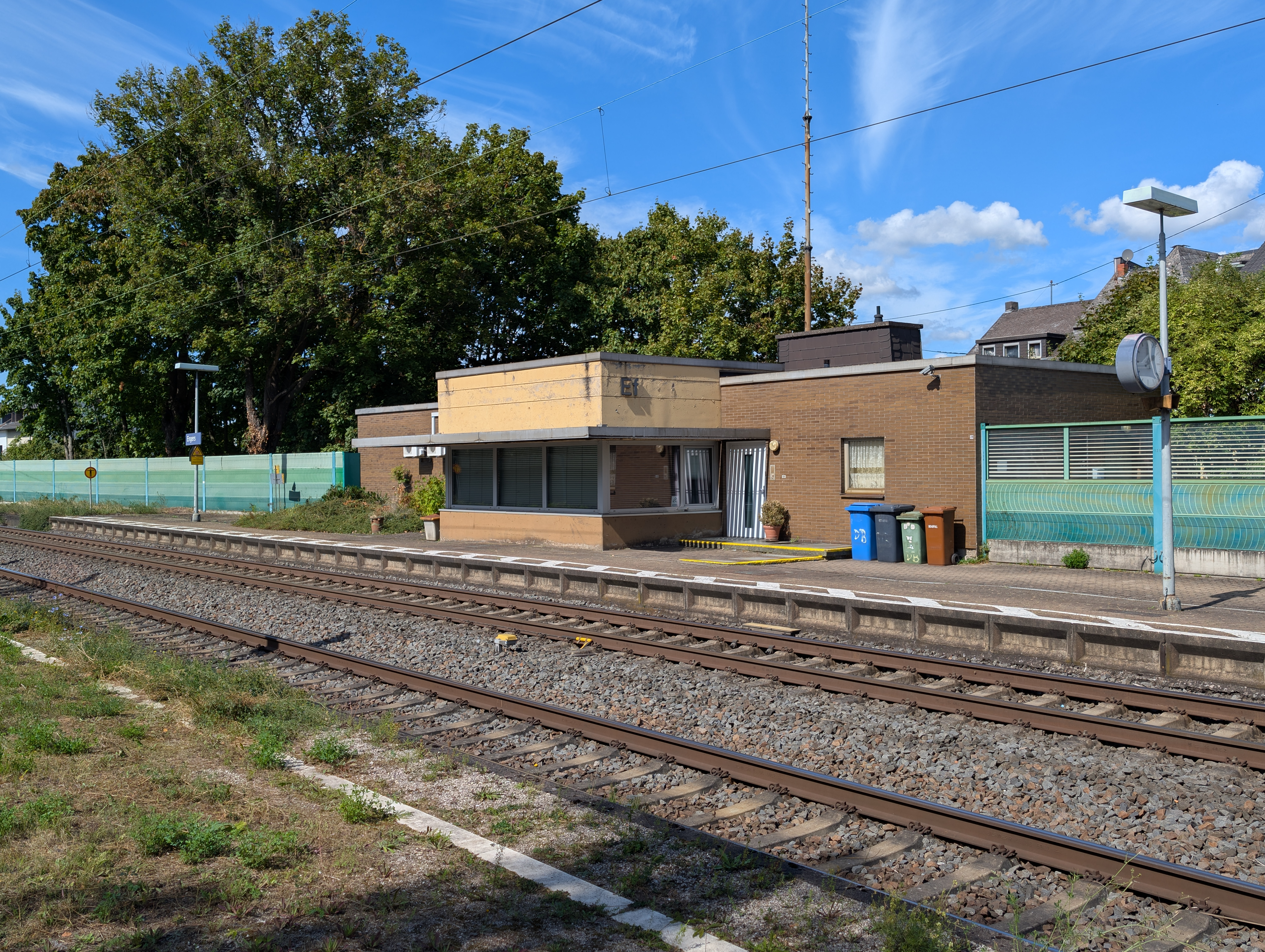
Engers station

Engers station was built 1869 as an importance junction for passenger and freight transport on the East Rhine Railway between Koblenz and Cologne as well as on the Engers–Au railway, which is currently out of service.

== Miscellaneous ==
Nocturnal guided walkings through the town are conducted twice a month. Their invention was a surprising success.

It's an old tradition of hikers using the trail Thuringia—Rhine to throw little stones from Thuringia into the Rhine at the Engers banks.

== Literature ==
- Arbeitskreis 650 Jahre Stadtrechte Engers (Editor): Engers. Der Ort. Seine Geschichte. Geiger-Verlag, Horb am Neckar 2007, ISBN 978-3-86595-186-1.
