= Koblenz Stadtmitte station =

Railway station in Koblenz, Germany

Koblenz Stadtmitte
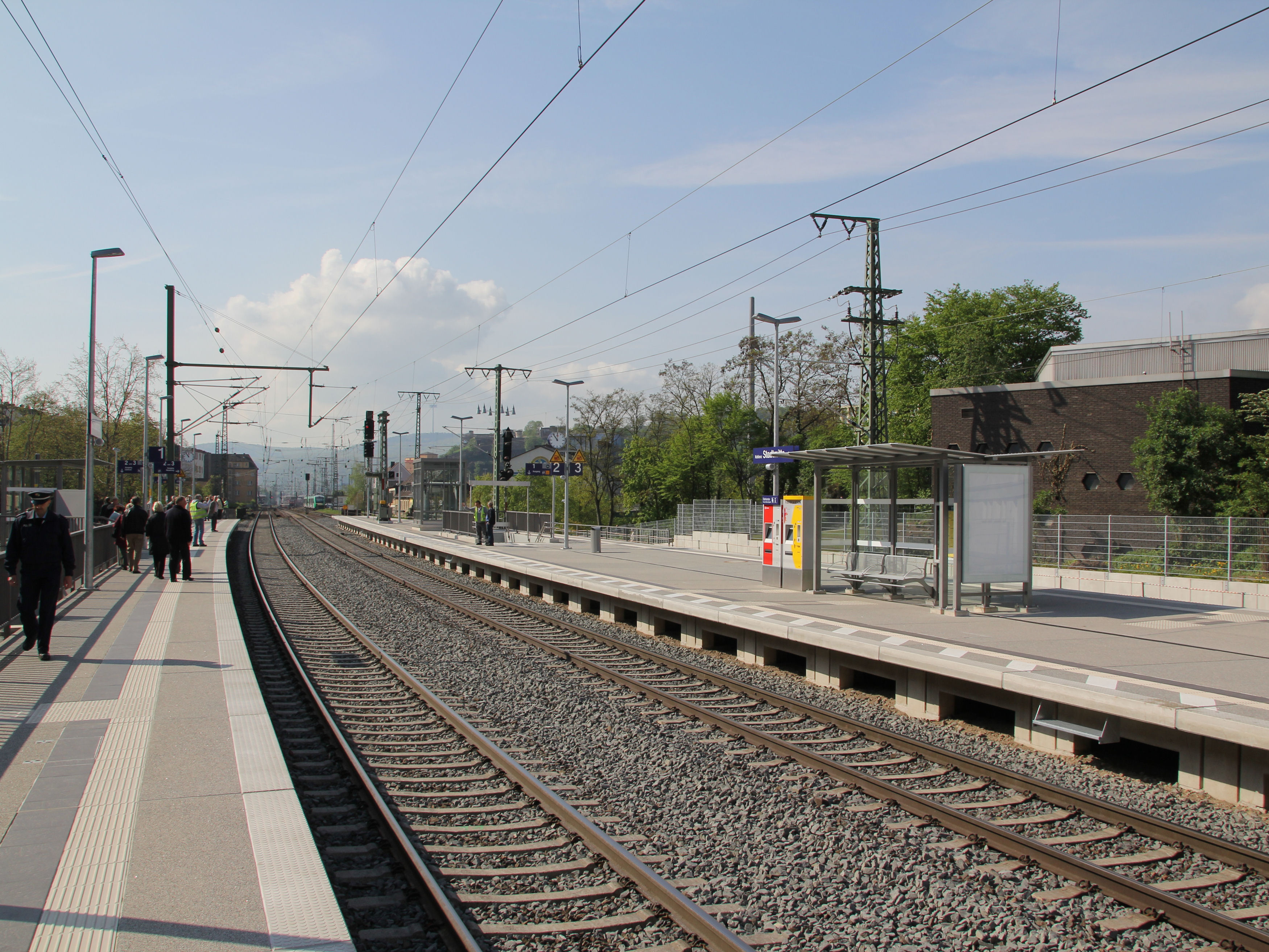
- Station platforms

General information
- Location: Pastor-Metzdorf-Weg, Koblenz, Rhineland-Palatinate; Germany
- Coordinates: 50°21′27″N 7°35′24″E
- Lines: West Rhine Railway; Neuwied–Koblenz railway
- Platforms: 3

Construction
- Accessible: Yes

Other information
- Station code: 8258
- DS100 code: KKSM
- IBNR: 8003341
- Category: 4
- Fare zone: VRM: 101
- Website: www.bahnhof.de

History
- Opened: 14 April 2011
Services
Preceding station	DB Regio Mitte	Following station
Urmitz towards Limburg (Lahn)	RB 23	Koblenz Hbf towards Mayen Ost
Preceding station	DB Regio NRW	Following station
Koblenz-Lützel towards Mönchengladbach Hbf	RE 8	Koblenz Hbf Terminus
Preceding station	National Express Germany	Following station
Andernach towards Wesel	RE 5 (Rhein-Express)	Koblenz Hbf Terminus
Preceding station	Trans Regio	Following station
Koblenz-Lützel towards Köln Messe/Deutz	RB 26	Koblenz Hbf towards Mainz Hbf
Preceding station	VIAS	Following station
Neuwied Terminus	RB 10	Koblenz Hbf towards Frankfurt (Main) Hbf
Location
- Location within Rhineland-Palatinate

Koblenz Stadtmitte station (German: Haltepunkt Koblenz Stadtmitte, freely translated as "Koblenz City Centre station") was opened on 14 April 2011 on the West Rhine Railway (German: Linke Rheinstrecke) in central Koblenz in the German state of Rhineland Palatinate. The main purpose of this station is to improve public transport access to central Koblenz because it is more convenient than Koblenz Hauptbahnhof (main station). In addition, it played an essential role as the station serving the Federal Horticultural Show 2011 in Koblenz.

== Location ==
Koblenz Stadtmitte is classified as a Haltepunkt, which means a station that is not a rail junction and has no sets of points. It is centrally located in the Koblenz city centre, right behind the Löhr-Center shopping centre, and near the pedestrian zone. There is also a bus station in the same shopping centre near the station, with a direct bus connection to almost every district of Koblenz.

In the second half of the 19th century there had been an earlier station near the modern station on today's Fischelstraße. It was called the Rhenish station (Rheinischer Bahnhof, after the Rhenish Railway Company, its builder) and was on the West Rhine Railway, running from Cologne to Bingerbrück. In 1902, it was replaced by the current Koblenz Hauptbahnhof.

== History ==
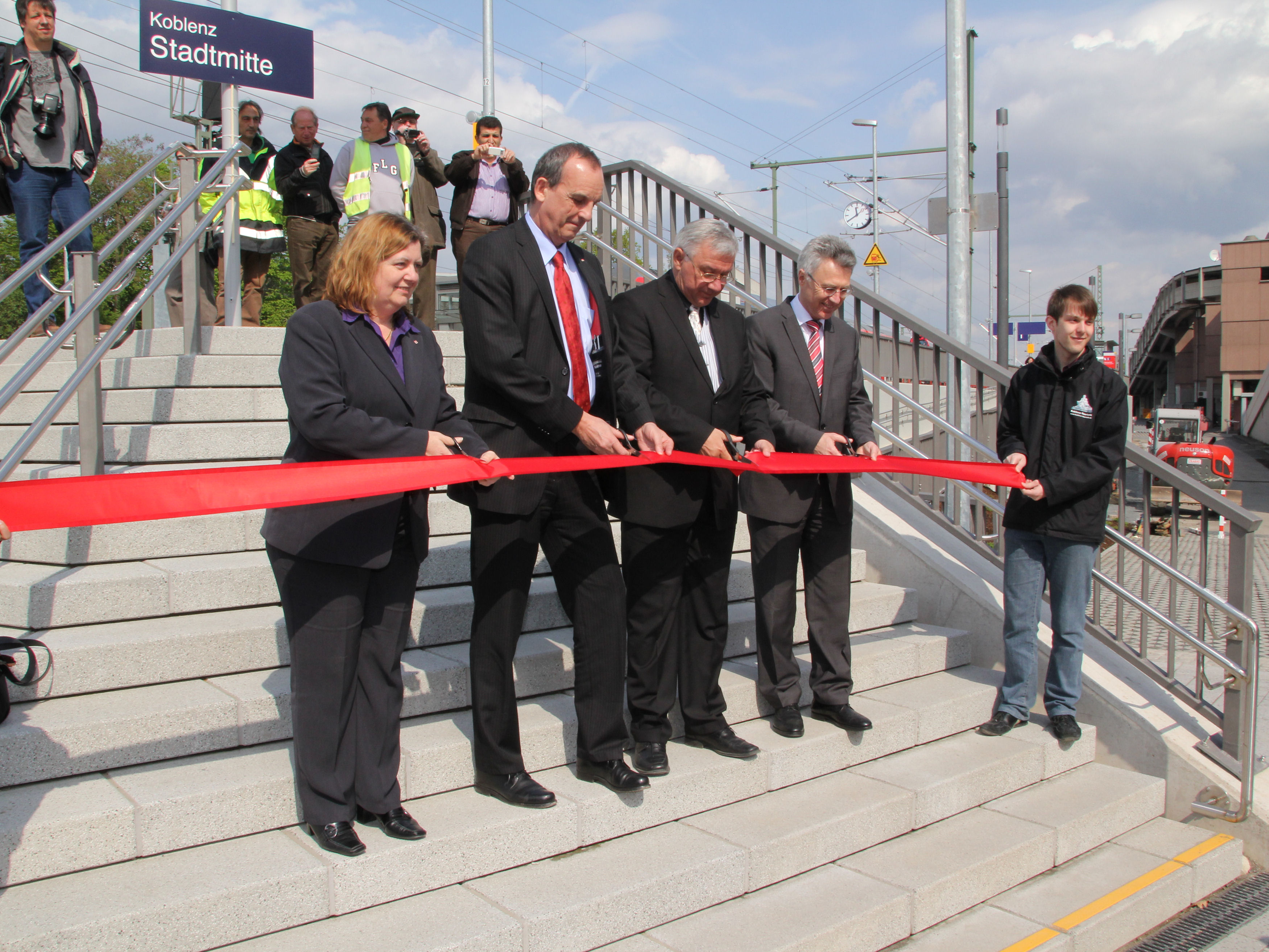
Opening of the station by Mayor Joachim Hofmann-Göttig on 14 April 2011

Already in the 1930s there were proposals for a station near the centre of the city. However, these were not pursued. This idea was raised again in the late 1970s and plans were developed. Despite considerable debate a decision to build the station was not taken until 2005. A major factor in this decision was the selection of Koblenz as the site for the Federal Horticultural Show 2011. Preliminary work began in January 2008. Before the start of work on the station, the westernmost of the three tracks had to be moved about five metres to the west for a length of about 300 metres to make room for the platform. Subsequently, construction started on a central platform for tracks 2 and 3 and an outside platform for track 1. On 14 April 2011, a day before the start of the Federal Horticultural Show, operations started at the station.

In 2005, it was estimated that the station would cost €9.1 million, but it ended up costing about €18.5 million. The state of Rhineland-Palatinate provided about €9.1 million of this.

== Services ==
Koblenz Stadtmitte has three platform tracks, consisting of a side platform on track 1 and a central platform between tracks 2 and 3. The platforms are designed for trains with a length of 180 metres. Access to the platforms is barrier-free and the platforms have a height of 76 cm to provide barrier-free access to trains. The station is served by four services. It is served by Regional-Express line 5 services, running between Koblenz and Emmerich, and Regionalbahn 26 services, running between Koblenz and Cologne-Deutz. These two services use tracks 1 and 2. Track 3 is used by RB 10 services in both directions between Neuwied and Frankfurt am Main. RB 27 services also stop on track 3 in both directions, running on the right bank route (East Rhine Railway) through Neuwied between Koblenz and Cologne.

Line	KBS	Route	Operator	Frequency
RE 5 Rhein-Express	470 Left Rhine line	Emmerich – Wesel – Duisburg – Düsseldorf – Cologne – Bonn – Remagen – Andernach – Koblenz Stadtmitte – Koblenz Hbf	National Express	60 min
RE 8 Rhein-Erft-Express	465 Right Rhine line	Mönchengladbach – Köln – Porz (Rhein) – Troisdorf – Bonn-Beuel – Neuwied – Koblenz Stadtmitte – Koblenz Hbf	DB Regio NRW	60 min
RB 10 RheingauLinie	466 Right Rhine line	Neuwied – Koblenz Stadtmitte – Koblenz Hbf – Rüdesheim am Rhein – Wiesbaden – Frankfurt am Main	VIAS	60 min
RB 23 Lahn-Eifel-Bahn	478/470/625 Eifelquer Railway/Left Rhine line/Lahntal railway	Mayen – Mendig – Andernach – Koblenz Stadtmitte – Koblenz – Niederlahnstein – Bad Ems – Diez – Limburg	DB Regio Mitte	60 min
RB 26 MittelRheinBahn	470 Left Rhine line	Köln – Bonn – Remagen – Andernach – Koblenz Stadtmitte – Koblenz Hbf	trans regio	60 min

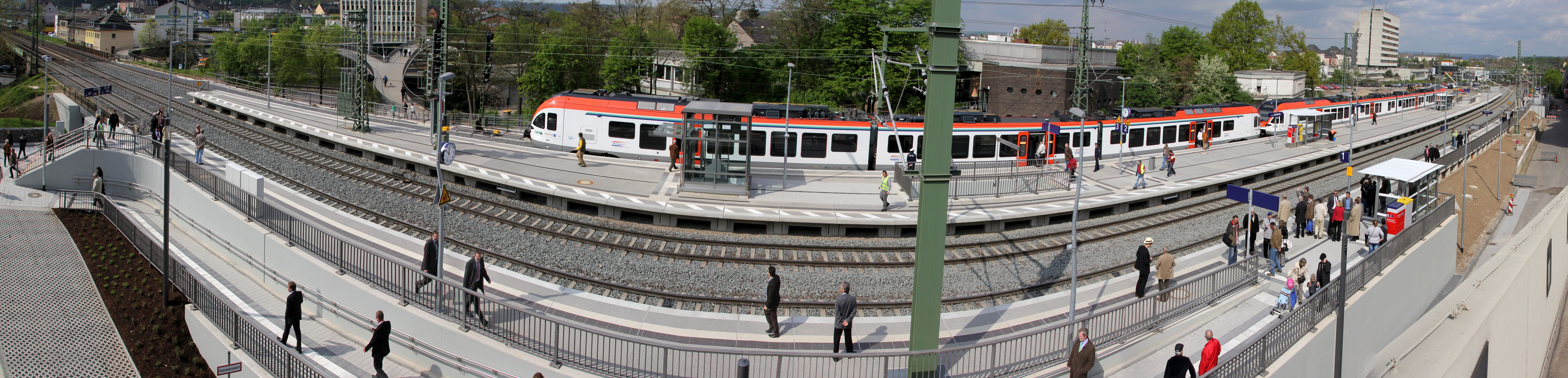
Panorama of Koblenz Stadtmitte station
