= DB Museum, Koblenz =

Railway museum in Germany

Coordinates: 50°22′40″N 7°35′31″E

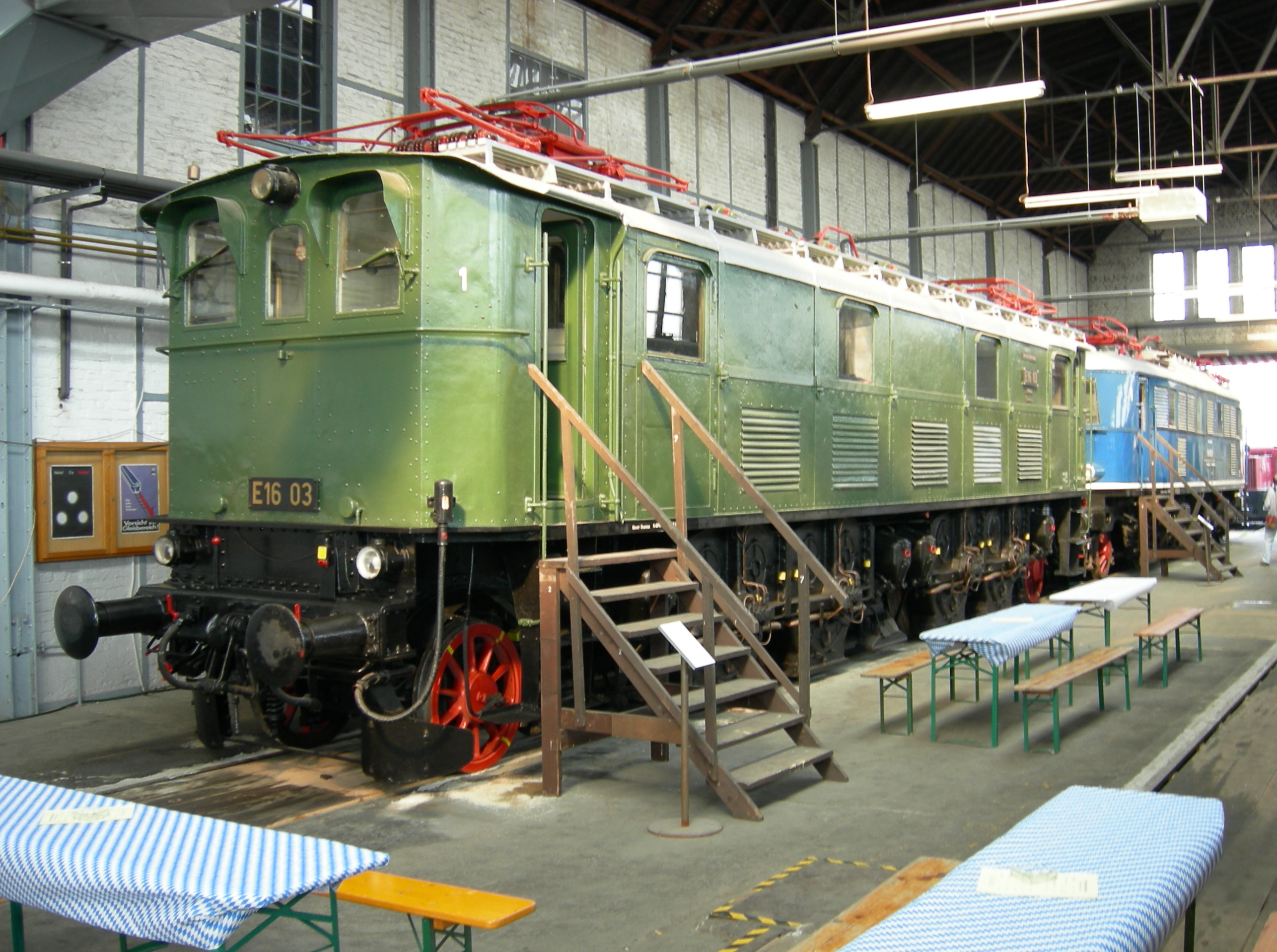
DRG Class E 16

The DB Museum in Koblenz was opened on 21 April 2001 as the first remote site of the Nuremberg Transport Museum. It is run by volunteer workers as part of the Stiftung Bahn-Sozialwerk (BSW), a kind of railway workers social service organisation, and has its origins in a BSW's 'Group for the Preservation of Historical Railway Vehicles' at Koblenz.

== Emergence ==
The DB Museum, Koblenz, is housed in the former goods wagon repair shop (Ausbesserungswerk) in the Koblenz district of Lützel. The site was built in 1905 as part of the rebuilding and expansion of Lützel goods station into the Koblenz-Lützel locomotive depot (Bahnbetriebswerk).

Originally the facility included a large roundhouse with two turntables, where the goods locomotives were stabled, as well as a wagon shed in which goods wagons were repaired until 1995. Today it accommodates the vehicles belonging to the DB Museum at Koblenz. The old Bahnbetriebswerk was dismantled bit by bit up to the early 1980s.

== Exhibits ==
Various exhibits are displayed on the open part of the site. The museum's collection of vehicles includes more than 20 locomotives and wagons. The central themes of the exhibitions are electric trains and travelling by rail. In addition to the exhibits of actual vehicles, these themes are expanded by means of photographs, pictures and models in the museum rooms.

== Other facilities ==
Books, model railway items and other gifts with a railway theme may be found in the small shop at the entrance.

A model railway, built in modular (Nordmodul) fashion, recalls the atmosphere of the steam age in the post-war years. Outside in the open air, a 110 m^{2} LGB garden railway layout is being constructed.
