= Neuwied–Koblenz railway =

Railway line in Germany

Coordinates: 50°21′40″N 7°35′25″E

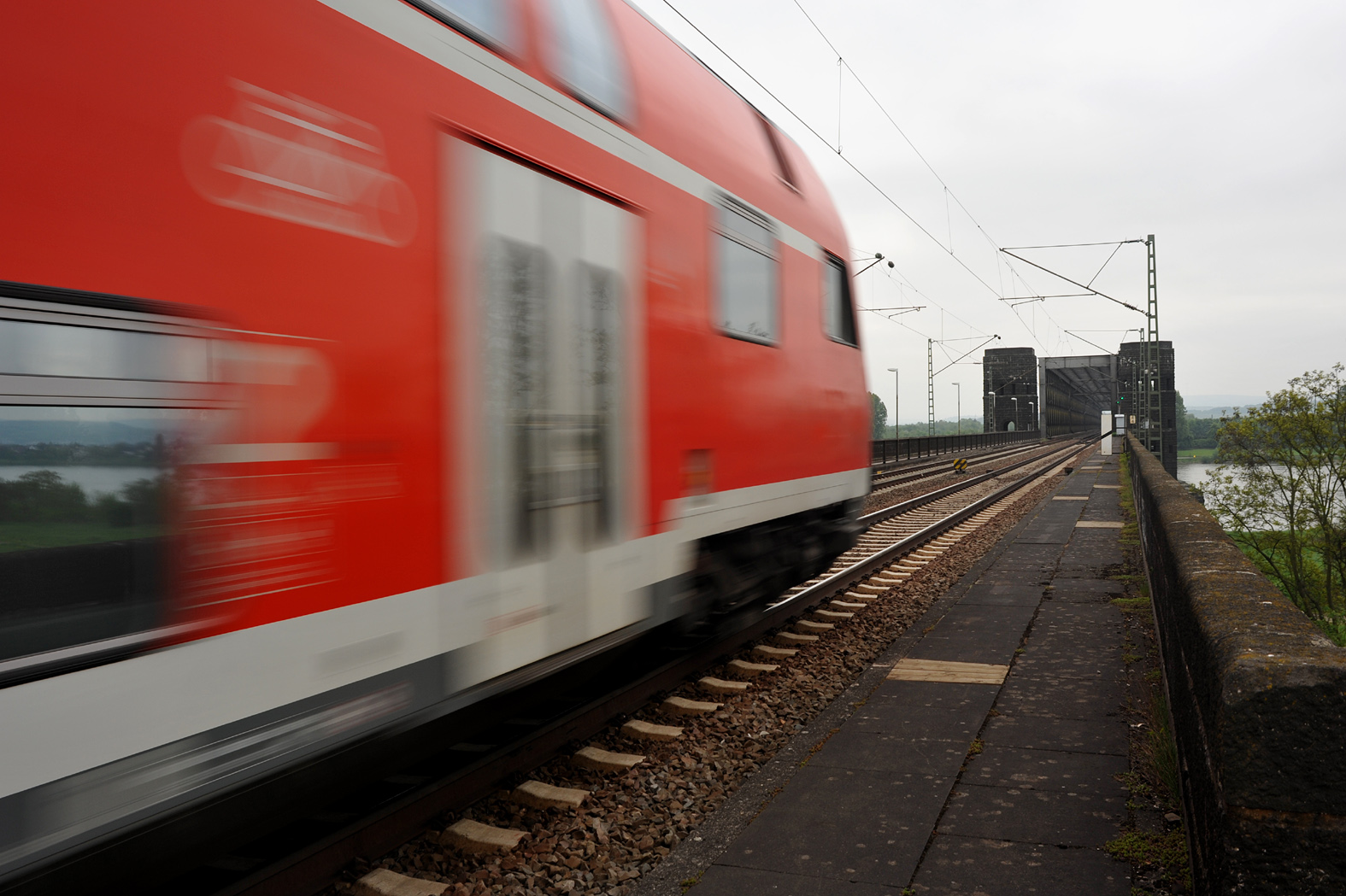
- Regionalbahn train to Koblenz next to Urmitz Rheinbrücke stop

Overview
- Line number: 3011 (Neuwied–Koblenz Mosel); 3012 (Koblenz-Lützel–Koblenz); 3014 (Kesselheim–Koblenz-Lützel Nord)
- Locale: Rhineland-Palatinate, Germany

Service
- Route number: 465 (MG–C–)Neuwied–Koblenz; 466 Neuwied–Koblenz(–WI)

Technical
- Line length: 14.2 km (8.8 mi)
- Num of tracks: 2 (Neuwied–Koblenz Mosel)
- Track gauge: 1,435 mm (4 ft 8 1/2 in) standard gauge
- Electrification: 15 kV/16.7 Hz AC overhead
- Operating speed: 140 km/h (87 mph)

The Koblenz–Neuwied railway is a two-track, electrified main line railway in the German state of Rhineland-Palatinate. It connects the Neuwied station on the Right (east) Rhine line to the major railway junction at Koblenz Hauptbahnhof (central station) and to the Left (west) Rhine and Moselle lines.

== History ==
The railway line and the Crown Prince William Bridge were built during the First World War, for military and strategic reasons, by the Prussian state railways and opened on 15 August 1918. Also built at the same time were the Ludendorff Bridge at Remagen, together with a connection to the Ahr Valley Railway and the Hindenburg Bridge at Rudesheim, together with a connection to the Nahe Valley Railway.

On 15 September 1935, Urmitz Rheinbrücke halt was opened. The line was put out of service on 9 March 1945, late in the Second World War, by the demolition of the line by German pioneers and reconstruction was not completed until 1954. Just two years later, the bridge was damaged by fire, with repairs lasting until May 1957.

On 22 September 1962, the bridge became fully functional again, with two tracks, upgraded and electrified with overhead wire. For a better connection to the Brexbach Valley Railway and the Westerwald, a single track curve was built connecting to the right bank line running south towards Engers station but it was never put into operation.

In 1987, the Urmitz Rheinbrücke halt was closed. After the renovation of the bridge in 2005, the halt was reopened on 28 May 2006.

== Route ==
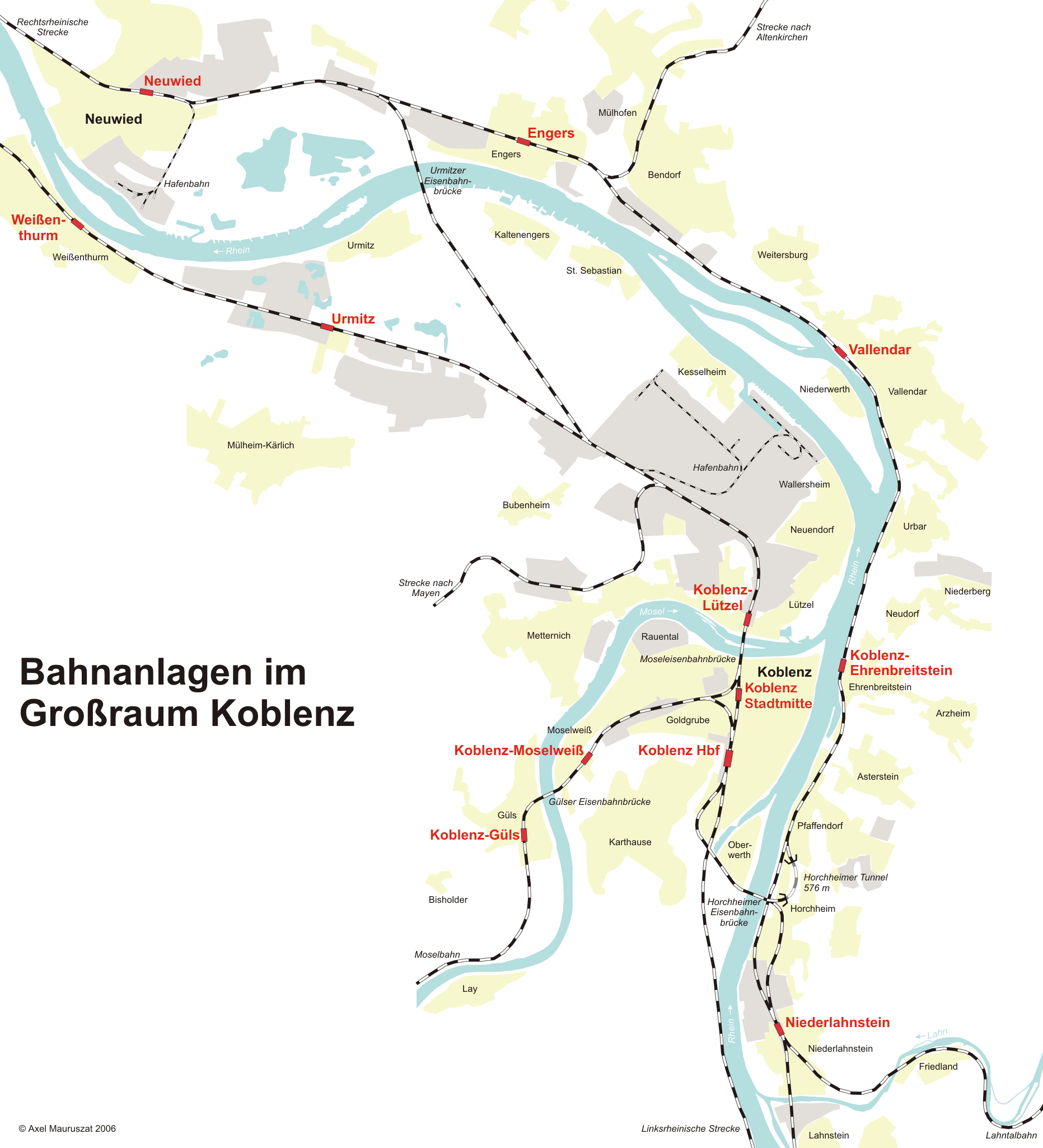
Map

The line branches from the Right Rhine line in Neuwied station on the approach from the north as a two track line; the branch is a flying junction. The current crossover at Neuwied Rheinbrücke was formerly the location of the junction to the connecting line to Engers station and the Brexbach Valley Railway.

Urmitz Rheinbrücke halt is immediately west of the end of the Urmitz railway bridge. The line then runs on an embankment through the Neuwied Basin and crosses the A 48 autobahn.

At Kesselheim junction, a single track line branches off to run on the eastern side of the line and continues on the eastern side of the Left Rhine line, which it merges with in the Koblenz north industrial area in Koblenz-Bubenheim. In the northern track field of Koblenz-Lützel station, there is a connection to the port railway of Koblenz Rhine port.

The line crosses the Left Rhine line for the first time and runs through the northern track field of Koblenz-Lützel station to the west and parallel with the Left Rhine line and continues through Koblenz-Lützel station and over the Moselle railway bridge, which was widened to accommodate four tracks in 1927.

At the location of the former Koblenz station of the Rhenish Railway, the line branches. Two tracks run on a large curve to the right to the former Koblenz Moselle freight yard and one track continues to run parallel with the Left Rhine line through Koblenz-Stadtmitte station to Koblenz Hauptbahnhof.

== Operations ==
The only passenger services on the line, until December 2010, was one local train line. This runs hourly between Cologne Hauptbahnhof and Koblenz Hauptbahnhof, some starting at Rommerskirchen station or Mönchengladbach Hauptbahnhof, and leaves the Right Rhine line at Neuwied station.

The first stop on the line is at Urmitz Rheinbrücke halt, where the line has already reached the left (western) bank of the Rhine. RE 8 Rhein-Erft-Express stops at the western platforms of Koblenz-Lützel and Koblenz Stadtmitte stations.

Since the timetable change on 12 December 2010, the Regionalbahn RB 10 service (RheingauLinie) is also operated hourly by the VIAS company. The service previously ran from Frankfurt via Wiesbaden and Rüdesheim am Rhein to Koblenz and it is now extended to Neuwied. Its only stop between Koblenz and Neuwied is at Koblenz-Stadtmitte.

The whole line is located in the area of the transport association Verkehrsverbund Rhein-Mosel (VRM).
