= Urmitz =

- Municipality
- Coat of arms

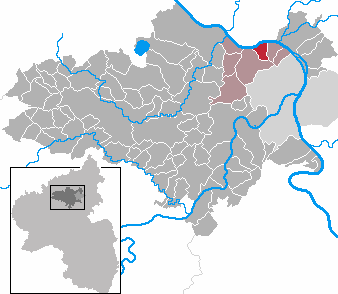
- Location of Urmitz within Mayen-Koblenz district
- Interactive map of Urmitz
- Location within Germany Location within Rhineland-Palatinate
- Coordinates: 50°24′51″N 7°31′11″E
- Country: Germany
- State: Rhineland-Palatinate
- District: Mayen-Koblenz
- Municipal assoc.: Weißenthurm

Government
  - Mayor (2019–24): Norbert Bahl

Area
  - Total: 3.77 km^{2} (1.46 sq mi)
- Elevation: 66 m (217 ft)

Population (2025-12-31)
  - Total: 3,339
  - Density: 886/km^{2} (2,290/sq mi)
- Time zone: UTC+01:00 (CET)
  - Summer (DST): UTC+02:00 (CEST)
- Postal codes: 56220
- Dialling codes: 02630
- Vehicle registration: MYK
- Website: urmitz.de

Urmitz (German pronunciation: [ˈʊʁmɪt͡s]) is a municipality in the district of Mayen-Koblenz in Rhineland-Palatinate, western Germany. In the 4th millennium BC it contained one of the largest fortified settlements of the time. This archaeological site has since been destroyed by modern construction.

== Local council ==
The local council has 20 members.

The elections in 2014 showed the following results.

Election	SPD	CDU	Total
2014	12	8	20 seats
2009	12	8	20 seats
2004	12	8	20 seats

== Transport ==
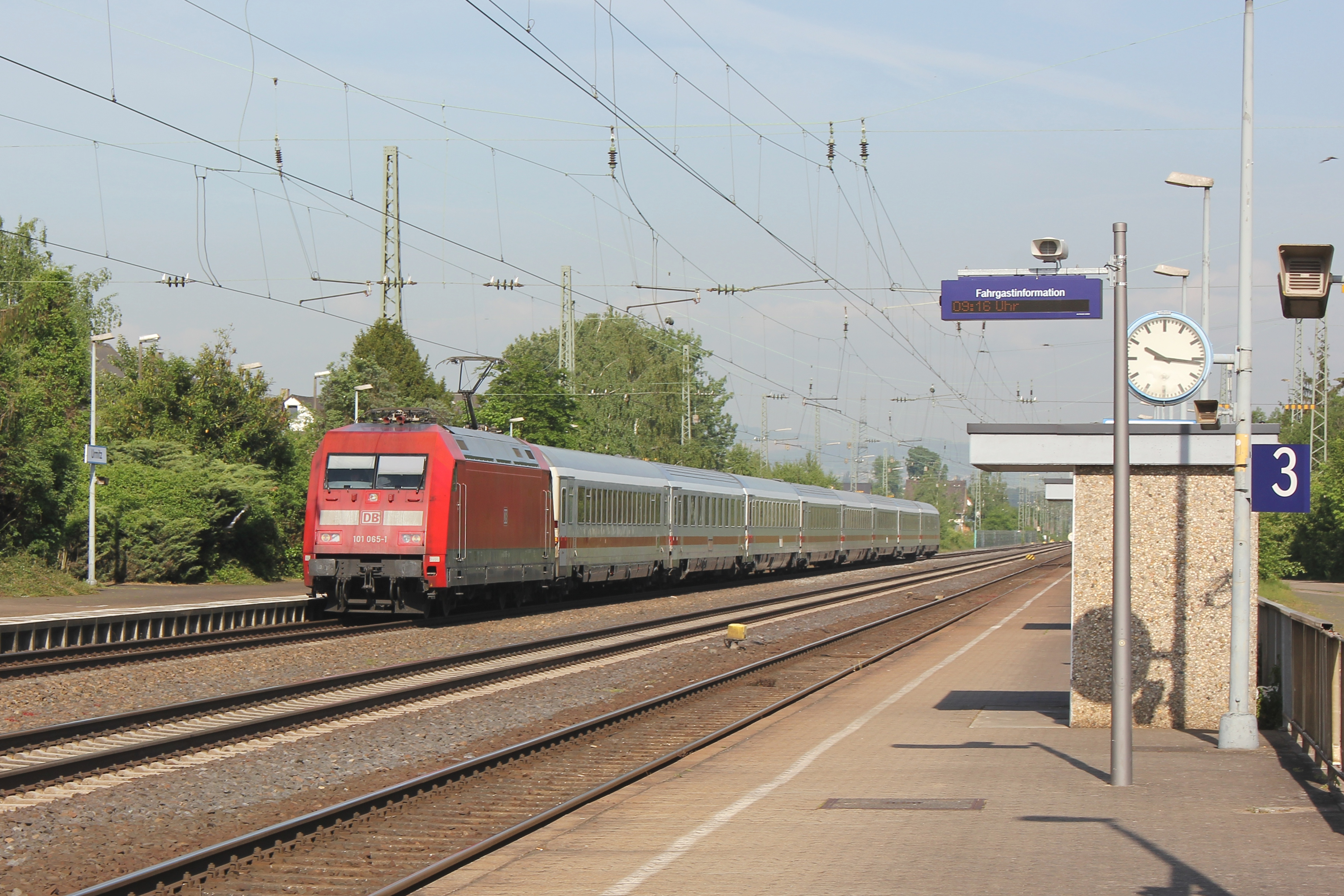
Mülheim-Kärlich station

Mülheim-Kärlich (Formerly:Urmitz train station) is served by lines RB23 (Lahn-Eifel-Bahn, Limburg - Diez - Bad Ems - Koblenz - Andernach - Mayen) as well as RB26 (Mainz - Bingen - Koblenz - Bonn - Cologne)
