= Nordhofen =

- Municipality
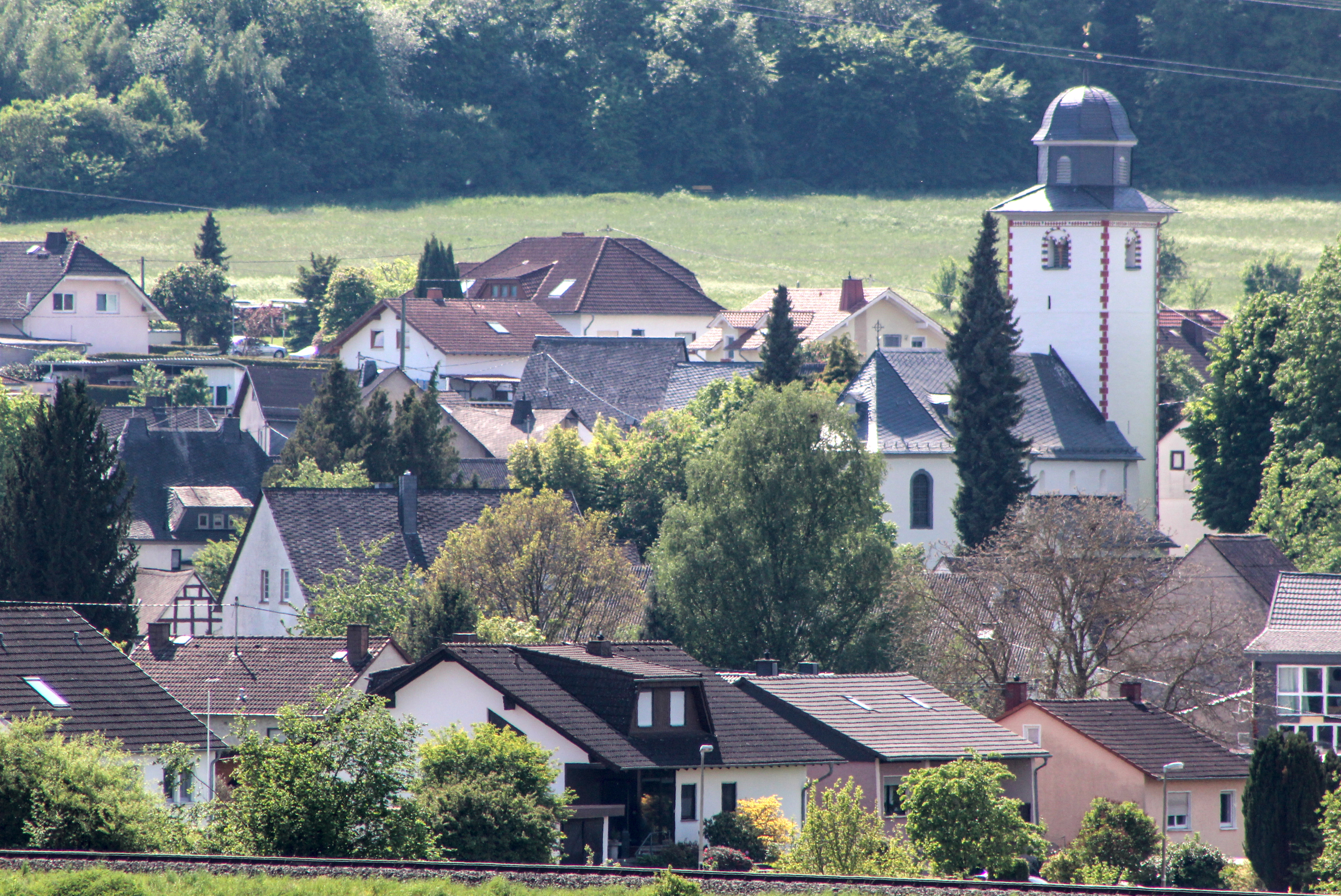

- Coat of arms

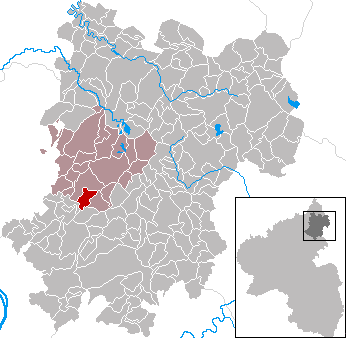
- Location of Nordhofen within Westerwaldkreis district
- Interactive map of Nordhofen
- Location within Germany Location within Rhineland-Palatinate
- Coordinates: 50°31′7″N 7°45′12″E
- Country: Germany
- State: Rhineland-Palatinate
- District: Westerwaldkreis
- Municipal assoc.: Selters (Westerwald)

Government
  - Mayor (2019–today): Dominik John

Area
  - Total: 3.86 km^{2} (1.49 sq mi)
- Elevation: 269 m (883 ft)

Population (2025-12-31)
  - Total: 525
  - Density: 136/km^{2} (352/sq mi)
- Time zone: UTC+01:00 (CET)
  - Summer (DST): UTC+02:00 (CEST)
- Postal codes: 56242
- Dialling codes: 02626
- Vehicle registration: WW

Nordhofen is an Ortsgemeinde – a community belonging to a Verbandsgemeinde – in the Westerwaldkreis in Rhineland-Palatinate, Germany.

== Geography ==
The recognized tourist community of Nordhofen lies on the abandoned stretch of the Westerwaldbahn (railway) between Siershahn and Altenkirchen in the heart of a mountainous landscape wooded with beeches and spruces. The community belongs to the Verbandsgemeinde of Selters, a kind of collective municipality. Its seat is in the like-named town.

== History ==
In 1259, Nordhofen had its first documentary mention. In 1357, Emperor Karl IV granted Count Wilhelm of Wied the right to expand Nordhofen into a town. He received the right “to be allowed to build with stones, put together, lay out and make into a walled town the village and its layout with moats, walls, towers, oriels, gates, and other things as he can and likes to do, without anyone’s hindering or speaking against it”. Owing to the absence of the natural conditions for a town location, the town of Nordhofen could not be properly developed. Hence, in 1653, Emperor Ferdinand III transferred the town rights from Nordhofen to the more favourable location of the new settlement of Neuwied at the request of the then Count Friedrich of Wied. In 1972, in the course of municipal restructuring, the Verbandsgemeinde of Selters was founded, to which Nordhofen belongs.

=== Religion ===
To the Evangelical parish belong the communities of Nordhofen, Mogendorf, Vielbach and Quirnbach. Until 1851, Selters and the surrounding villages also belonged to the parish.

== Politics ==
The municipal council is made up of 12 council members, as well as the honorary and presiding mayor (Ortsbürgermeister), who were elected in a majority vote in a municipal election in 2019. In the local elections 2024, Dominic John was confirmed in his office as presiding mayor.

== Economy and infrastructure ==
=== Transport ===
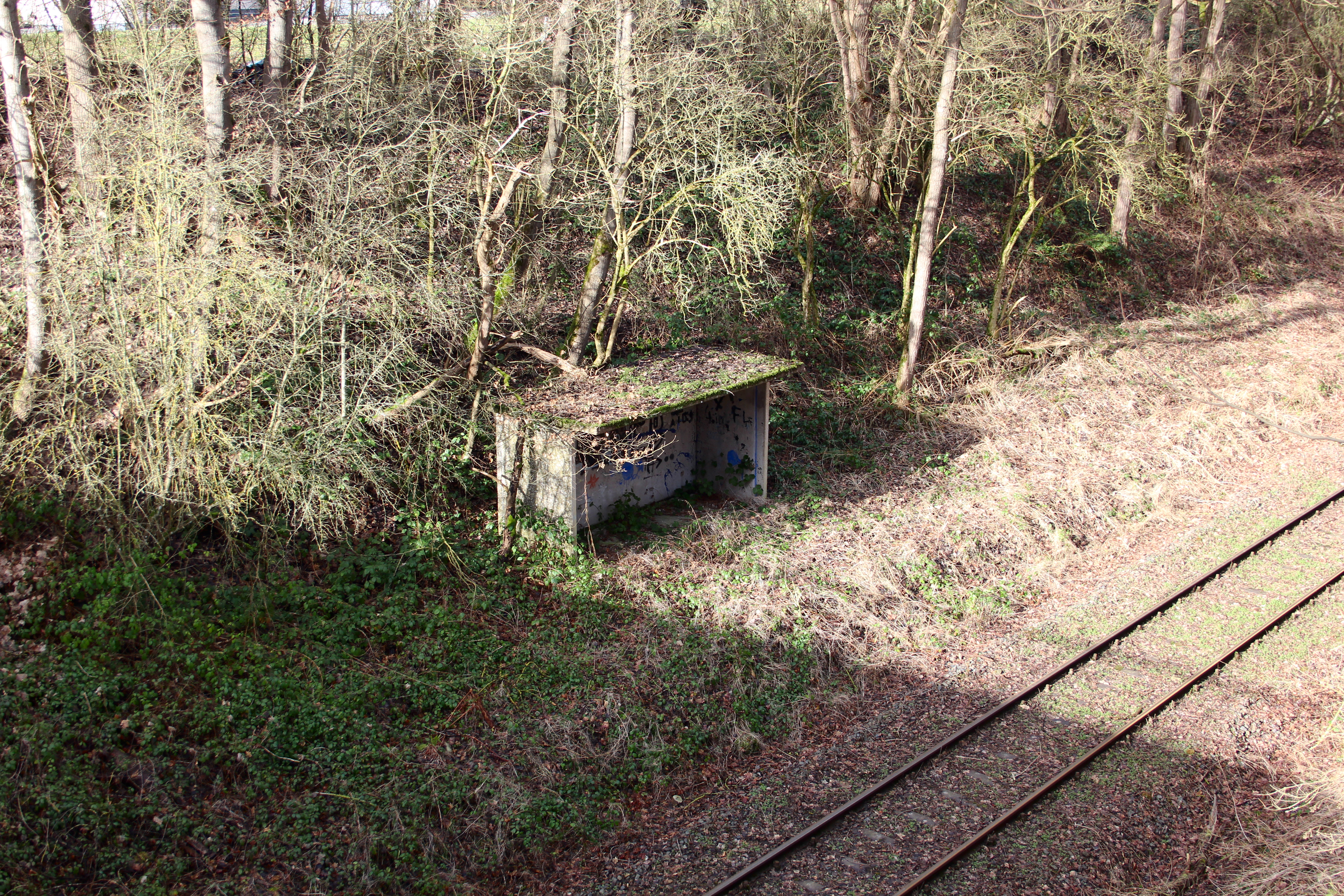
The Nordhofen train stop (without passenger transport)

Nordhofen is served by the local bus lines 420 and 424. The nearest Autobahn interchange is Mogendorf on the A 3 (Cologne–Frankfurt). Nordhofen used to have a stop at the Engers-Au railway, but currently it is out of service, nowadays the nearest train station is Siershahn at the Lower Westerwald Railway (RB29). Nordhofen is served by local busses. It is located on the area of the transport association Verkehrsverbund Rhein-Mosel (VRM) zone number 435. The nearest InterCityExpress stop is the railway station at Montabaur on the Cologne-Frankfurt high-speed rail line.

=== Clubs ===
Over the last few decades, a lively club life has developed. There are 4 community clubs: the volunteer fire brigade, Harmonie Nordhofen e.V. , the game and sport club (Spiel- und Sportverein; SSV) and the fruitgrowing and gardening club.
