= Goddert =

- Municipality
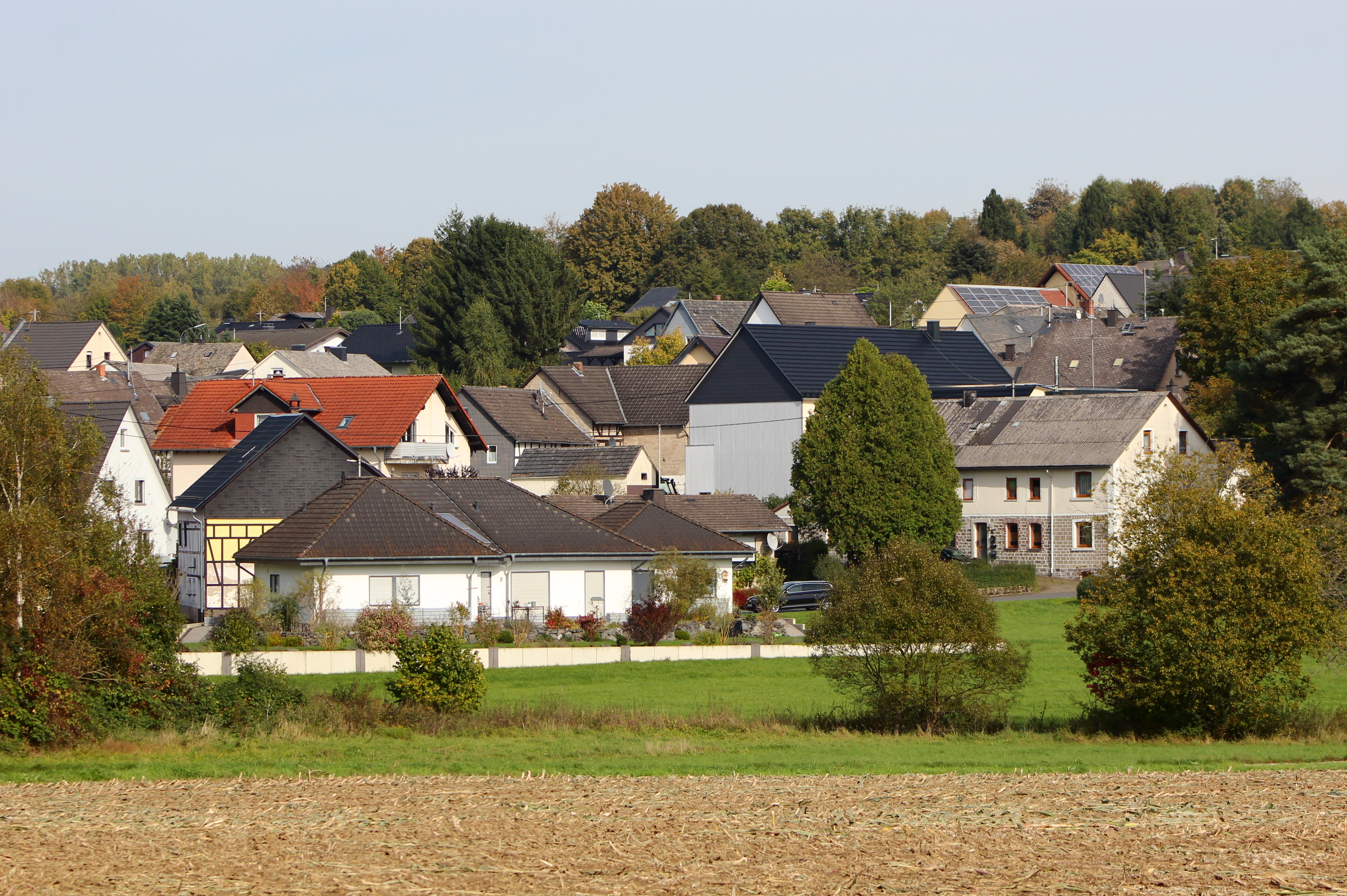

- Coat of arms

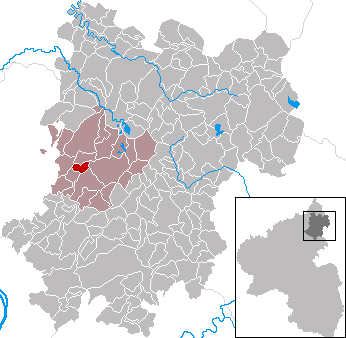
- Location of Goddert within Westerwaldkreis district
- Interactive map of Goddert
- Location within Germany Location within Rhineland-Palatinate
- Coordinates: 50°32′57″N 7°44′49″E
- Country: Germany
- State: Rhineland-Palatinate
- District: Westerwaldkreis
- Municipal assoc.: Selters (Westerwald)

Government
  - Mayor (2019–24): Peter Aller

Area
  - Total: 2.39 km^{2} (0.92 sq mi)
- Elevation: 270 m (890 ft)

Population (2025-12-31)
  - Total: 426
  - Density: 178/km^{2} (462/sq mi)
- Time zone: UTC+01:00 (CET)
  - Summer (DST): UTC+02:00 (CEST)
- Postal codes: 56244
- Dialling codes: 02626
- Vehicle registration: WW
- Website: www.selters-ww.de

Goddert is an Ortsgemeinde (a community belonging to a Verbandsgemeinde) in the Westerwaldkreis in Rhineland-Palatinate, Germany. It belongs to the Verbandsgemeinde of Selters, a kind of collective municipality. Its seat is in the like-named town.

== Geography ==
The rural residential community of Goddert lies three km (1.9 mi) north of Selters in the centre of the Westerwald.

== History ==
In 1476, Goddert had its first documentary mention under the names Gonderode und Goderoth. In 1972, in the course of municipal restructuring, the Verbandsgemeinde of Selters, to which Goddert belongs, was founded.

== Politics ==
The municipal council is made up of eight council members, as well as the honorary and presiding mayor (Ortsbürgermeister), who were elected in a municipal election on 7 June 2009.

Seat apportionment at community council:

	WG Kohlenberg	Grüne	Total
2004	7	1	8 seats

== Economy and infrastructure ==
Northwest of the community runs Bundesstraße 413 leading from Bendorf to Hachenburg. The nearest Autobahn interchange is Mogendorf on the A 3 (Cologne–Frankfurt). Goddert is located at the Engers–Au railway, although it is only in service for fright trains. The nearest train stations are Siershahn and Altenkirchen, the nearest InterCityExpress stop is the railway station at Montabaur on the Cologne-Frankfurt high-speed rail line.
