= Schenkelberg =

- Municipality
- Coat of arms

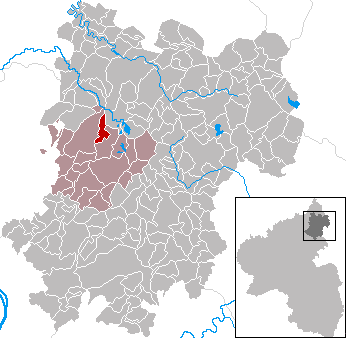
- Location of Schenkelberg within Westerwaldkreis district
- Interactive map of Schenkelberg
- Location within Germany Location within Rhineland-Palatinate
- Coordinates: 50°35′1″N 7°46′58″E
- Country: Germany
- State: Rhineland-Palatinate
- District: Westerwaldkreis
- Municipal assoc.: Selters (Westerwald)

Government
  - Mayor (2019–24): Carolin Bruns

Area
  - Total: 3.52 km^{2} (1.36 sq mi)
- Elevation: 395 m (1,296 ft)

Population (2025-12-31)
  - Total: 629
  - Density: 179/km^{2} (463/sq mi)
- Time zone: UTC+01:00 (CET)
  - Summer (DST): UTC+02:00 (CEST)
- Postal codes: 56244
- Dialling codes: 02626
- Vehicle registration: WW
- Website: www.gemeinde-schenkelberg.de

Schenkelberg is an Ortsgemeinde – a community belonging to a Verbandsgemeinde – in the Westerwaldkreis in Rhineland-Palatinate, Germany.

== Geography ==
Schenkelberg lies 3 km from Herschbach and 7 km from Selters. Right nearby is found the Westerwald Lake Plateau, a popular holiday and recreation area. The local area offers many hiking and cycling paths. The community belongs to the Verbandsgemeinde of Selters, a kind of collective municipality. Its seat is in the like-named town.

== History ==
In 1219, Schenkelberg had its first documentary mention, and after several slight spelling changes has borne the same name since 1624 that it still bears today.

== Politics ==
The municipal council is made up of 12 council members, as well as the honorary and presiding mayor (Ortsbürgermeister), who were elected in a municipal election on 13 June 2004.

Sitzverteilung im gewählten Gemeinderat:

	WG Bösch	WG Böckling	Total
2004	8	4	12 seats

== Economy and infrastructure ==
The community lies west of Bundesstraße 8, leading from Limburg an der Lahn to Siegburg. The nearest Autobahn interchange is Mogendorf on the A 3 (Cologne–Frankfurt). The nearest InterCityExpress stop is the railway station at Montabaur on the Cologne-Frankfurt high-speed rail line.
