= Wölferlingen =

- Municipality
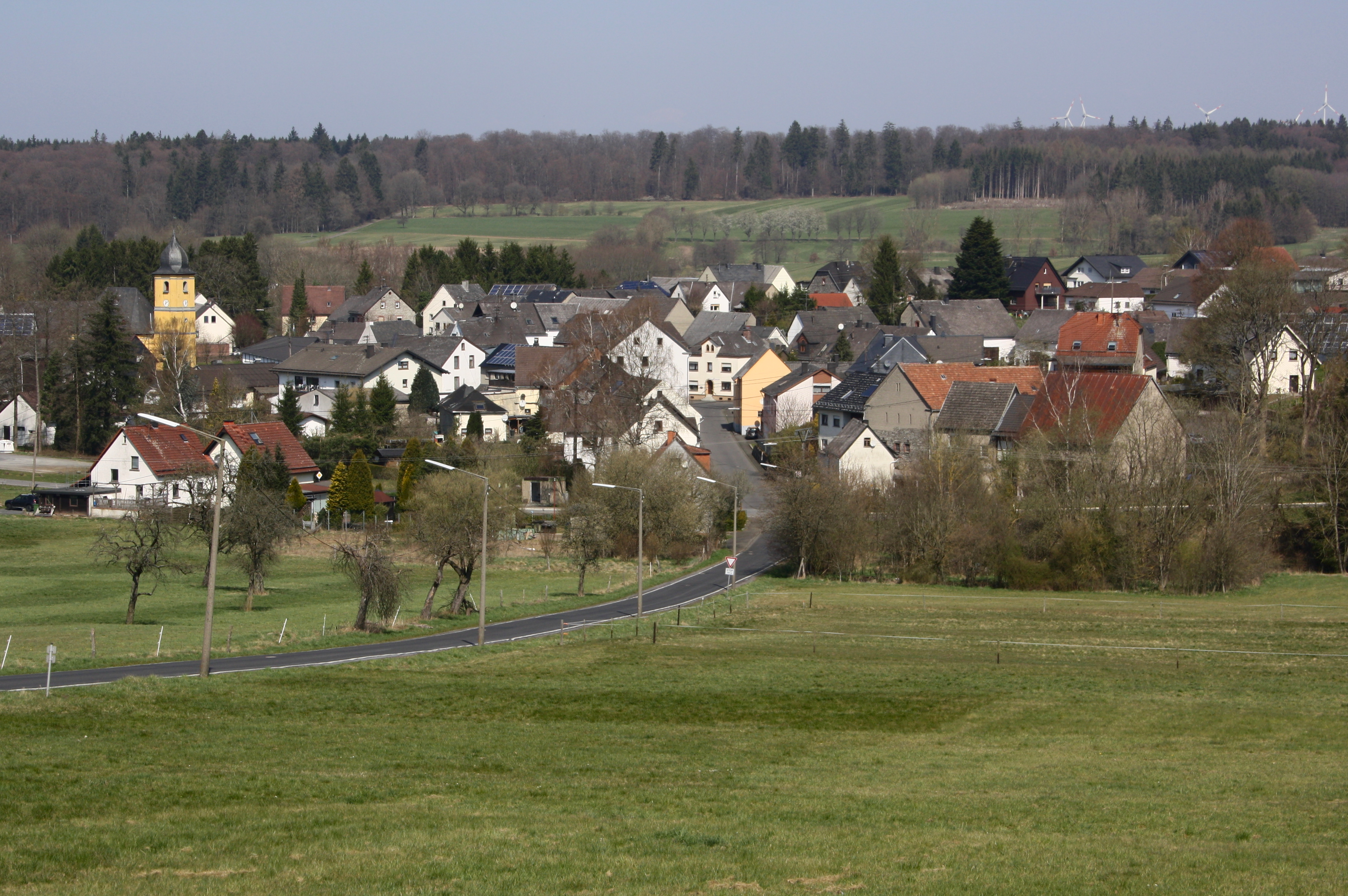

- Coat of arms

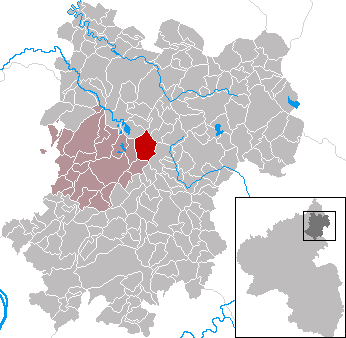
- Location of Wölferlingen within Westerwaldkreis district
- Interactive map of Wölferlingen
- Location within Germany Location within Rhineland-Palatinate
- Coordinates: 50°33′52″N 7°51′4″E
- Country: Germany
- State: Rhineland-Palatinate
- District: Westerwaldkreis
- Municipal assoc.: Selters (Westerwald)

Government
  - Mayor (2019–24): Christoph Simon

Area
  - Total: 8.23 km^{2} (3.18 sq mi)
- Elevation: 400 m (1,300 ft)

Population (2025-12-31)
  - Total: 464
  - Density: 56.4/km^{2} (146/sq mi)
- Time zone: UTC+01:00 (CET)
  - Summer (DST): UTC+02:00 (CEST)
- Postal codes: 56244
- Dialling codes: 02666
- Vehicle registration: WW
- Website: www.vg-selters.de

Wölferlingen is an Ortsgemeinde – a community belonging to a Verbandsgemeinde – in the Westerwaldkreis in Rhineland-Palatinate, Germany.

== Geography ==
=== Location ===
Wölferlingen lies 8 km northeast of Selters on the Westerwald Lake Plateau, a popular holiday and recreation area offering many hiking and cycling paths. The Wölferlinger Weiher (a 1.02-ha pond) is a protected natural area and is known for its rare bird and plant species. Wölferlingen belongs to the Verbandsgemeinde of Selters, a kind of collective municipality. Its seat is in the like-named town.

=== Constituent communities ===
The community has one outlying centre called Düringen.

== History ==
In 1349, Wölferlingen had its first documentary mention as Wulferinc. In 1359 it was called Wolfferingin, then later Wölfringen, Wolffryngen or Wulffringen, and since 1622 Wölferlingen. In 1399, a chapel was built on the spot where the church now stands, allowing Wölferlingen to mark two round-numbered birthdays in 1999. While Wölferlingen was formerly an agricultural community, it has nowadays developed into an almost purely residential community. Now, there is still one full-time farmer and there are agricultural side-businesses. Nevertheless, the 800-ha municipal area – 305 ha of which is wooded – is still fully worked by these farmers. There is hardly any unused land. The forest was once the community's main income earner, but this has now changed. In the long term, the community fathers are happy if the break-even point is reached in the forest.

Today the community forest's importance stands in the foreground as a surety for keeping the air clean. The forest is used as water storage for the local people, an attraction for tourism, and as a common cultural resource.

== Politics ==
The municipal council is made up of 13 council members, including the extraofficial mayor (Bürgermeister), who were elected in a majority vote in a municipal election on 13 June 2004.

== Economy and infrastructure ==
The community lies east of Bundesstraße 8, leading from Limburg an der Lahn to Siegburg. The nearest Autobahn interchange is Mogendorf on the A 3 (Cologne–Frankfurt). The nearest InterCityExpress stop is the railway station at Montabaur on the Cologne-Frankfurt high-speed rail line.
