= Ellenhausen =

- Municipality
- Coat of arms

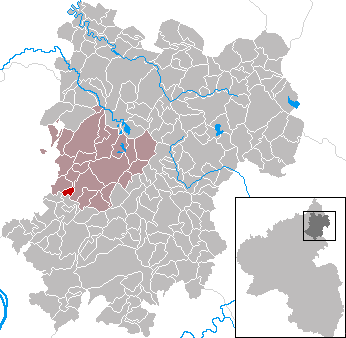
- Location of Ellenhausen within Westerwaldkreis district
- Interactive map of Ellenhausen
- Location within Germany Location within Rhineland-Palatinate
- Coordinates: 50°30′59″N 7°43′31″E
- Country: Germany
- State: Rhineland-Palatinate
- District: Westerwaldkreis
- Municipal assoc.: Selters (Westerwald)

Government
  - Mayor (2019–24): Heinz Müller

Area
  - Total: 1.90 km^{2} (0.73 sq mi)
- Elevation: 225 m (738 ft)

Population (2025-12-31)
  - Total: 304
  - Density: 160/km^{2} (414/sq mi)
- Time zone: UTC+01:00 (CET)
  - Summer (DST): UTC+02:00 (CEST)
- Postal codes: 56242
- Dialling codes: 02626
- Vehicle registration: WW
- Website: www.selters-ww.de

Ellenhausen is an Ortsgemeinde – a municipality belonging to a Verbandsgemeinde – in the Westerwaldkreis in Rhineland-Palatinate, Germany. The municipality belongs to the Verbandsgemeinde of Selters, a kind of collective municipality.

== Geography ==
Ellenhausen lies 3 km (2 mi) southwest of Selters (Westerwald) on the Saynbach in the middle of a broad land covered by woods and meadowland.

== History ==
In 1100, Ellenhausen had its first documentary mention. The name's spelling changed over the centuries from Elkinhusin to Helchinhusin to Ellenhausen. In 1972, in the course of administrative reforms, the Verbandsgemeinde of Selters was founded.

== Politics ==
The municipal council is made up of 8 council members, including the honorary and presiding mayor (Ortsbürgermeister), who were elected in a majority vote in a municipal election on 7 June 2009.

== Economy and infrastructure ==
The nearest Autobahn interchange is Mogendorf on the A 3 (Cologne–Frankfurt). The nearest InterCityExpress stop is the railway station at Montabaur on the Cologne-Frankfurt high-speed rail line.
