= Freilingen =

- Municipality
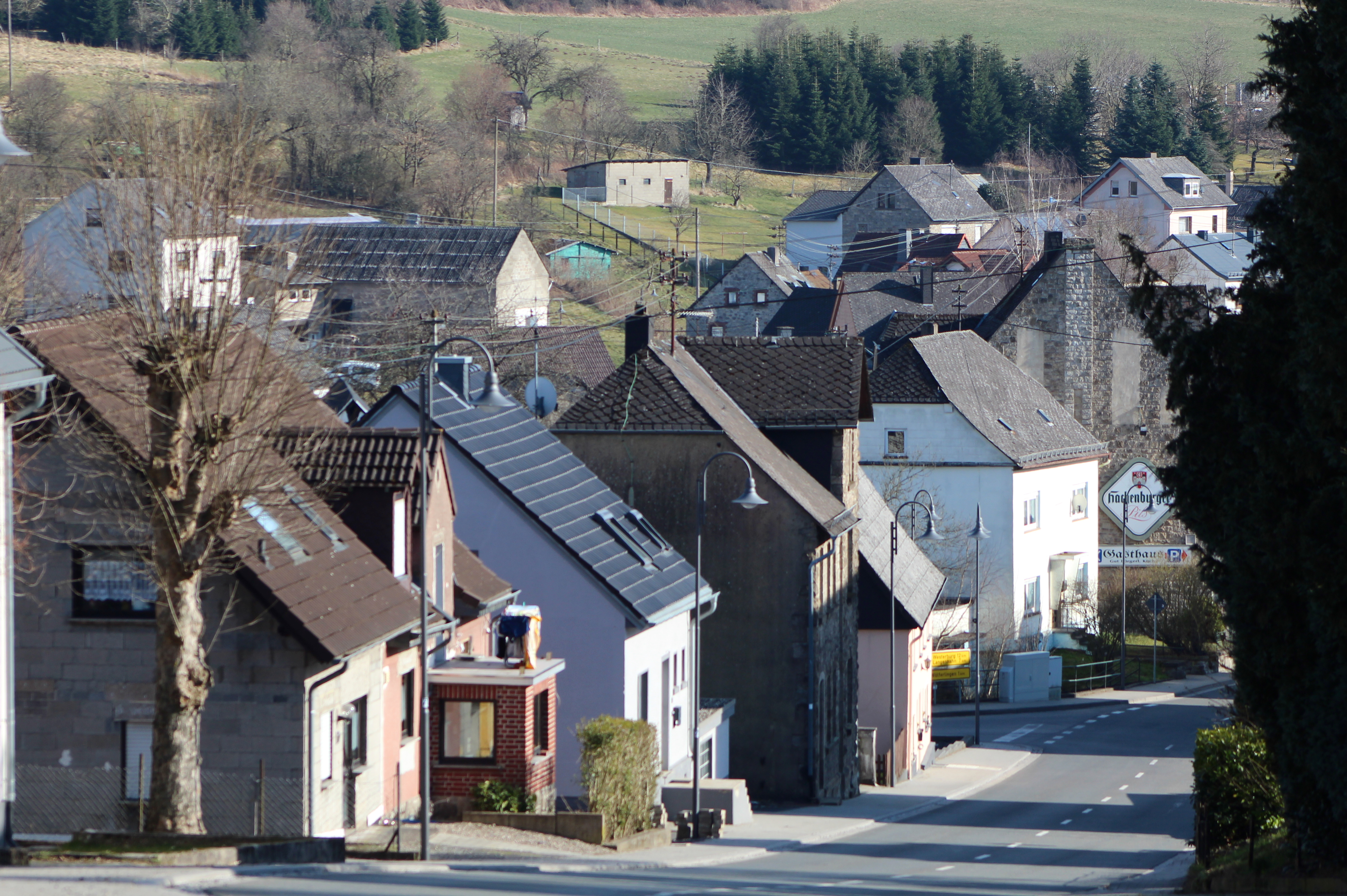

- Coat of arms

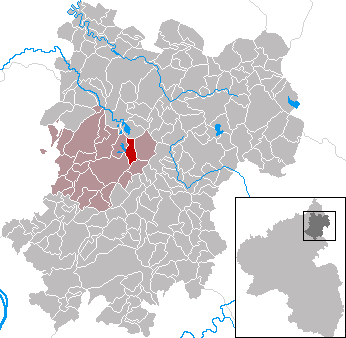
- Location of Freilingen within Westerwaldkreis district
- Interactive map of Freilingen
- Location within Germany Location within Rhineland-Palatinate
- Coordinates: 50°33′39″N 7°50′13″E
- Country: Germany
- State: Rhineland-Palatinate
- District: Westerwaldkreis
- Municipal assoc.: Selters (Westerwald)

Government
  - Mayor (2019–24): Thomas Kloft

Area
  - Total: 3.67 km^{2} (1.42 sq mi)
- Elevation: 385 m (1,263 ft)

Population (2025-12-31)
  - Total: 724
  - Density: 197/km^{2} (511/sq mi)
- Time zone: UTC+01:00 (CET)
  - Summer (DST): UTC+02:00 (CEST)
- Postal codes: 56244
- Dialling codes: 02666
- Vehicle registration: WW
- Website: www.freilingen.de

Freilingen is an Ortsgemeinde – a municipality belonging to a Verbandsgemeinde – in the Westerwaldkreis in Rhineland-Palatinate, Germany. The municipality belongs to the Verbandsgemeinde of Selters, a kind of collective municipality.

== Geography ==
Freilingen lies 7 km from Selters on the Westerwald Lake Plateau, a popular holiday and recreation area. The locality offers many hiking and cycling trails. The Freilinger Weiher (lake), the so-called Postweiher, is open to bathing in summer.

== History ==
In 1034, Freilingen had its first documentary mention as Vriligoim. In 1972, in the course of municipal restructuring, the Verbandsgemeinde of Selters was founded.

== Politics ==
The municipal council is made up of 12 council members, as well as the honorary and presiding mayor (Ortsbürgermeister), who were elected in a majority vote in a municipal election on 7 June 2009.

== Economy and infrastructure ==
Freilingen is located in the area of the transport association Verkehrsverbund Rhein-Mosel (VRM), zone 434 and connected to local bus line 431. The municipality lies right on Bundesstraße 8 leading from Limburg an der Lahn to Siegburg. The nearest Autobahn interchange is Mogendorf on the A 3 (Cologne–Frankfurt). The nearest InterCityExpress stop is the railway station at Montabaur on the Cologne-Frankfurt high-speed rail line.
