= Maxsain =

- Municipality
- Coat of arms

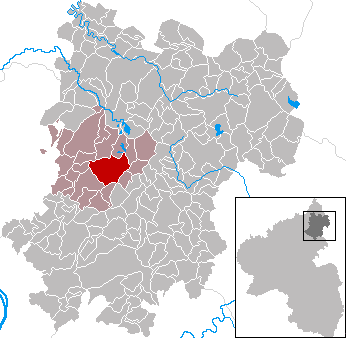
- Location of Maxsain within Westerwaldkreis district
- Interactive map of Maxsain
- Location within Germany Location within Rhineland-Palatinate
- Coordinates: 50°32′45″N 7°47′17″E
- Country: Germany
- State: Rhineland-Palatinate
- District: Westerwaldkreis
- Municipal assoc.: Selters (Westerwald)
- Subdivisions: 2

Government
  - Mayor (2019–24): Willi Löcher

Area
  - Total: 13.51 km^{2} (5.22 sq mi)
- Elevation: 275 m (902 ft)

Population (2025-12-31)
  - Total: 971
  - Density: 71.9/km^{2} (186/sq mi)
- Time zone: UTC+01:00 (CET)
  - Summer (DST): UTC+02:00 (CEST)
- Postal codes: 56244
- Dialling codes: 02626
- Vehicle registration: WW

Maxsain is an Ortsgemeinde – a community belonging to a Verbandsgemeinde – in the Westerwaldkreis in Rhineland-Palatinate, Germany.

== Geography ==
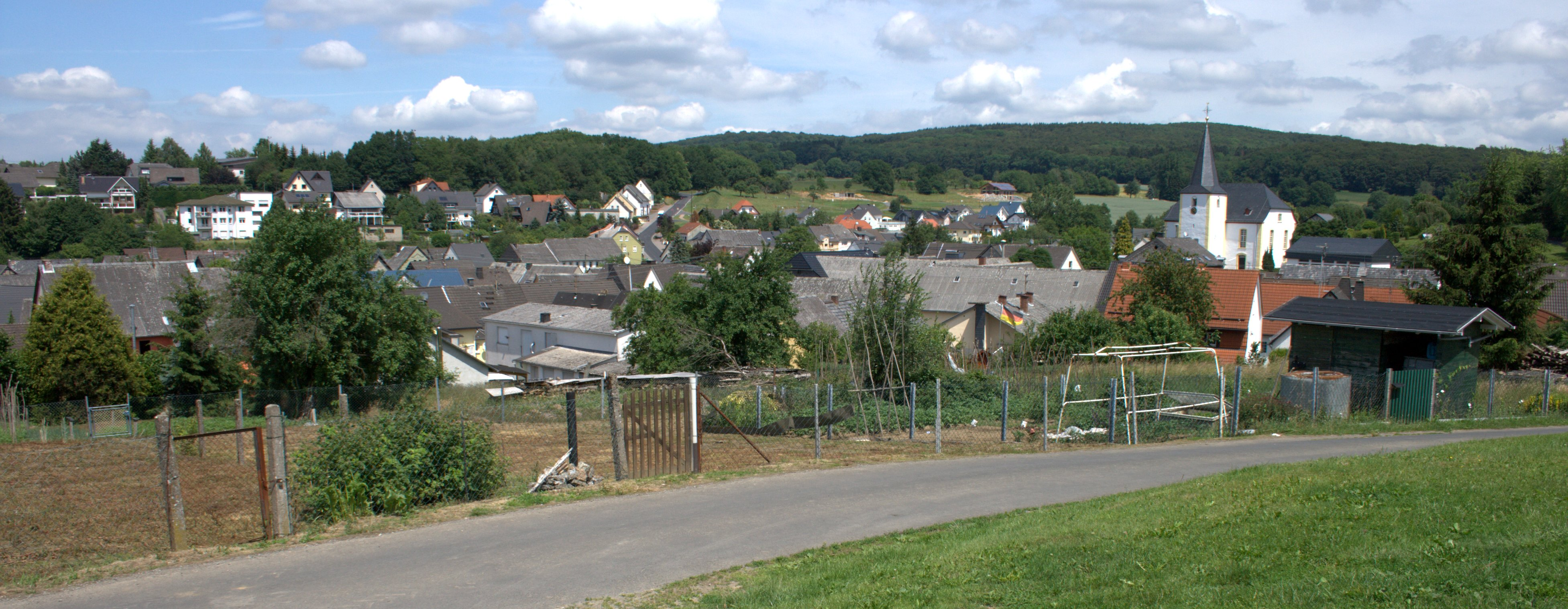
Maxsain

=== Location ===
The community lies between the district seat of Montabaur und Hachenburg. It lies on a brook, the Saynbach, which is joined in the middle of the village by its tributary the Steinchesbach. The nearest town is Selters, 3 km away. The community is part of the Verbandsgemeinde of Selters, a kind of collective municipality.

=== Constituent communities ===
The community of Maxsain consists of the centres of Maxsain and Zürbach, which lies some 3 km to the east of the main centre and has about 60 inhabitants. The centre was amalgamated into the community of Maxsain with administrative reform in 1974. Worth seeing are the Evangelical church and the Backes community house in the village centre.

== History ==
In 1194, Maxsain had its first documentary mention. The name's spelling changed over the centuries from Machseine to Maxeine and then Makeseyne. In 1972, in the course of municipal restructuring, the Verbandsgemeinde of Selters was founded, to which Maxsain belongs.

== Politics ==
The municipal council is made up of 16 council members, as well as the honorary and presiding mayor (Ortsbürgermeister), who were elected in a majority vote in a municipal election on 13 June 2004.

== Music ==
No longer imaginable is the community without the "Maxsainer Blaskapelle e.V.", founded in 1985. The club, with its roughly 40 musicians and wind orchestra is a fixture in the community and moreover, it furthers musical ability among the community's children and youth with its youth orchestra, flute groups and musical early education. Besides engagements within Maxsain, such as at the traditional kermis, the Maxsainer Blaskapelle is now more often to be heard at great shooting festivals, in kermis parades and at concerts. Among the yearly highlights is a collective concert performed together with music clubs from Sessenhausen and Helferskirchen, which is always held on the first Saturday in November. The overall musical leadership has lain since 2005 in Christoph Zirfas's hands.

== Economy and infrastructure ==
=== Transport ===
The community lies west of Bundesstraße 8, leading from Limburg an der Lahn to Siegburg. The nearest Autobahn interchange is Mogendorf on the A 3 (Cologne–Frankfurt). The nearest railway station is Siershahn on the Unterwesterwaldbahn (railway), which runs to Limburg. The nearest InterCityExpress stop is the railway station at Montabaur on the Cologne-Frankfurt high-speed rail line.

=== Public institutions ===
There is a campground with an outdoor swimming pool within Maxsain's municipal area.
