= Ewighausen =

- Municipality
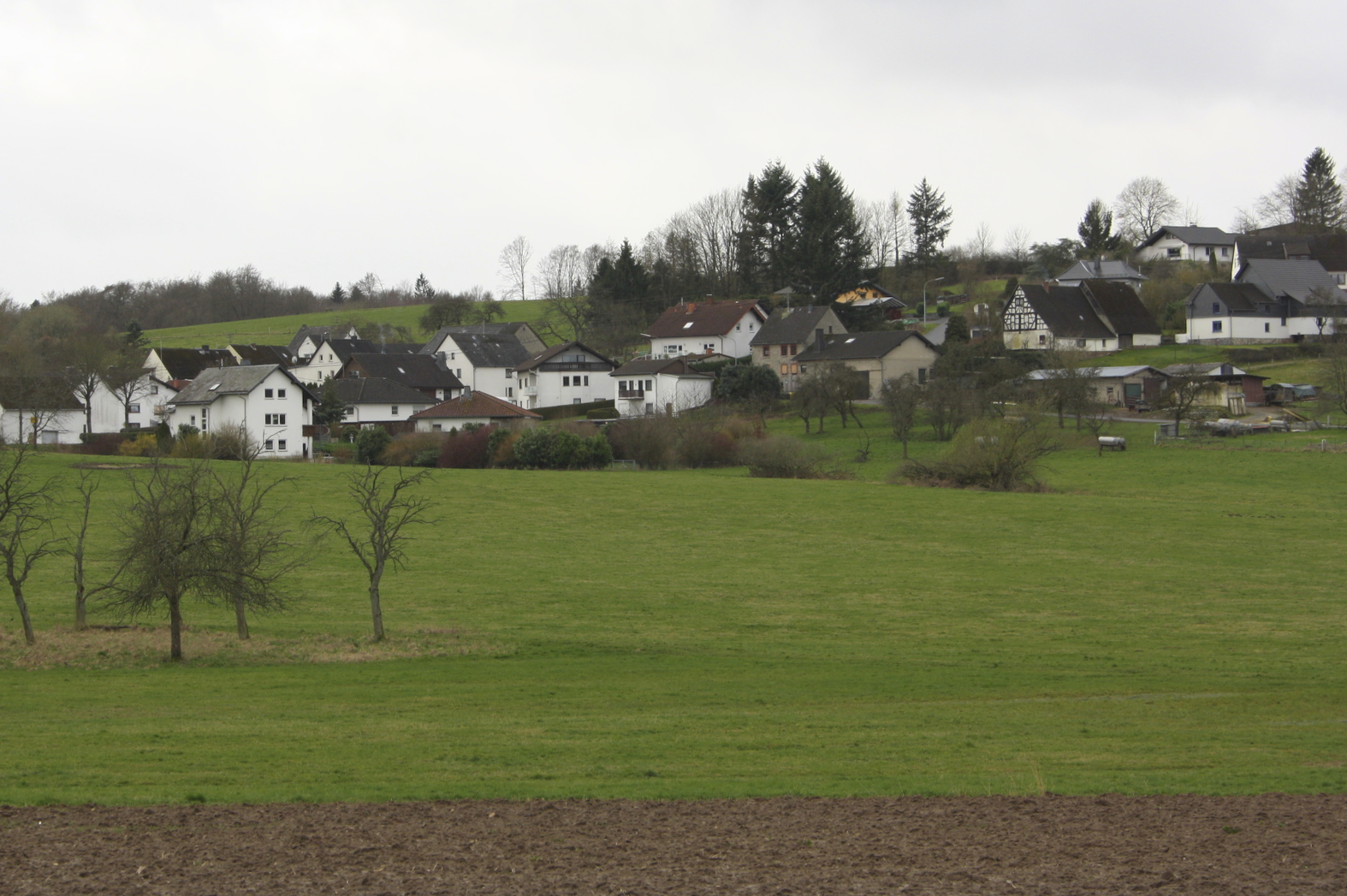

- Coat of arms

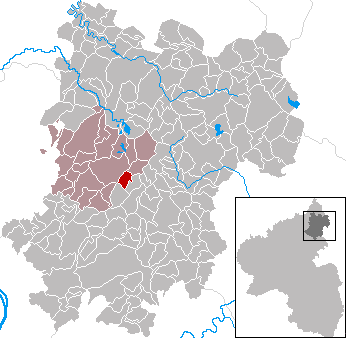
- Location of Ewighausen within Westerwaldkreis district
- Interactive map of Ewighausen
- Location within Germany Location within Rhineland-Palatinate
- Coordinates: 50°32′06″N 7°49′40″E
- Country: Germany
- State: Rhineland-Palatinate
- District: Westerwaldkreis
- Municipal assoc.: Selters (Westerwald)

Government
  - Mayor (2020–24): Andres Höver

Area
  - Total: 2.55 km^{2} (0.98 sq mi)
- Elevation: 395 m (1,296 ft)

Population (2025-12-31)
  - Total: 234
  - Density: 91.8/km^{2} (238/sq mi)
- Time zone: UTC+01:00 (CET)
  - Summer (DST): UTC+02:00 (CEST)
- Postal codes: 56244
- Dialling codes: 02666
- Vehicle registration: WW
- Website: www.selters-ww.de

Ewighausen is an Ortsgemeinde – a municipality belonging to a Verbandsgemeinde – in the Westerwaldkreis in Rhineland-Palatinate, Germany. The municipality belongs to the Verbandsgemeinde of Selters, a kind of collective municipality.

== Geography ==
The municipality lies 5 km east of Selters in the Westerwald on Landesstraße L 303 between the Westerwald Lake District and the Kannenbäckerland.

== History ==
In 1397, Ewighausen had its first documentary mention. The name's spelling has changed over the centuries from Ebichusin to Ebeckusen und Ewighusen and then into Ewighausen. In 1972, in the course of municipal restructuring, the Verbandsgemeinde of Selters was founded.

== Politics ==
The municipal council is made up of 6 council members, including the honorary and presiding mayor (Ortsbürgermeister), who were elected in a majority vote in a municipal election on 7 June 2009.

== Economy and infrastructure ==
The municipality lies west of Bundesstraße 8 leading from Limburg an der Lahn to Siegburg. The nearest Autobahn interchange is Mogendorf on the A 3 (Cologne–Frankfurt). The nearest InterCityExpress stop is the railway station at Montabaur on the Cologne-Frankfurt high-speed rail line.
