= Vielbach =

- Municipality
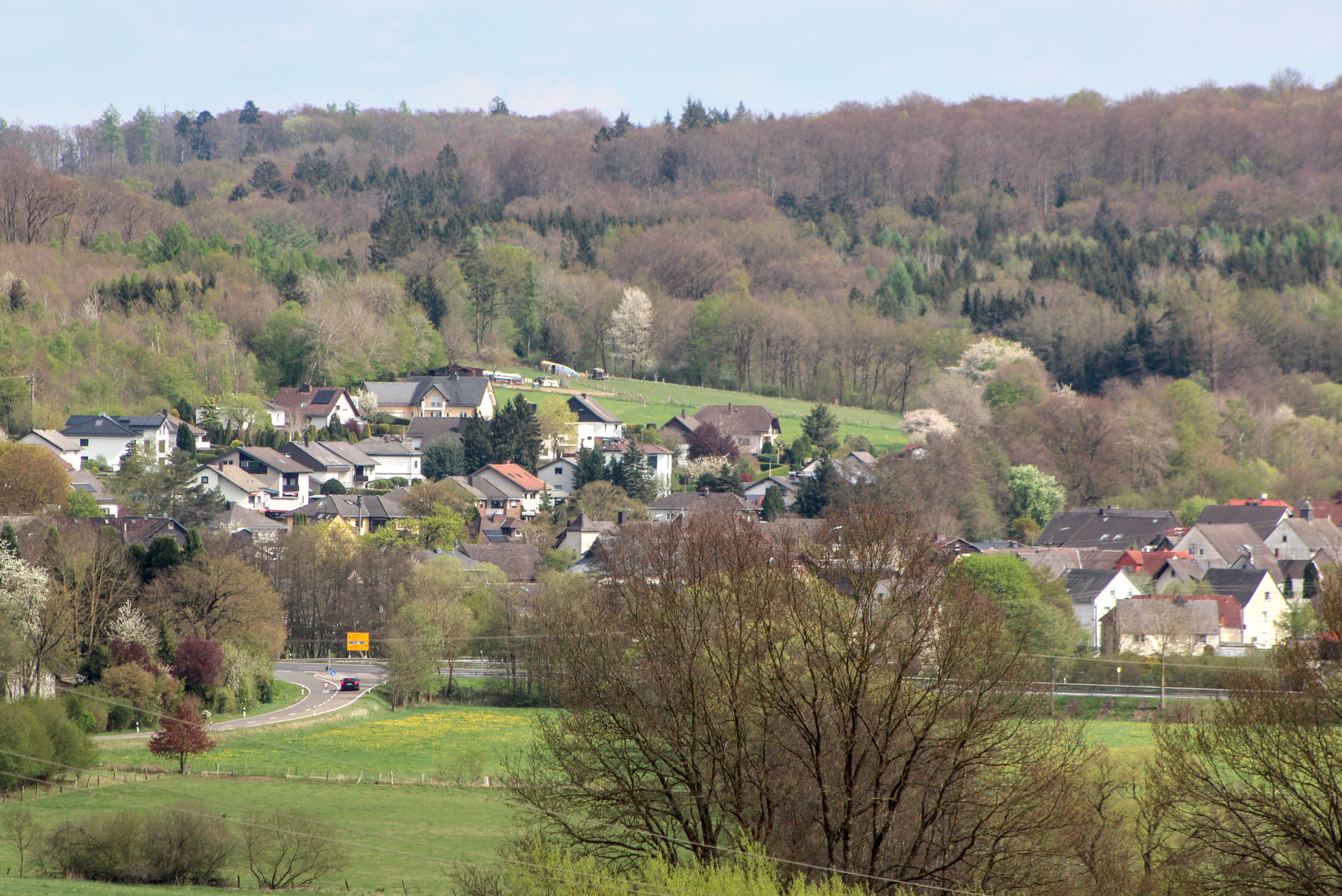

- Coat of arms

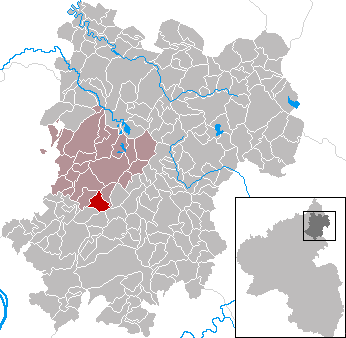
- Location of Vielbach within Westerwaldkreis district
- Interactive map of Vielbach
- Location within Germany Location within Rhineland-Palatinate
- Coordinates: 50°30′38″N 7°46′19″E
- Country: Germany
- State: Rhineland-Palatinate
- District: Westerwaldkreis
- Municipal assoc.: Selters (Westerwald)

Government
  - Mayor (2019–24): Uli Schneider

Area
  - Total: 4.55 km^{2} (1.76 sq mi)
- Elevation: 270 m (890 ft)

Population (2025-12-31)
  - Total: 564
  - Density: 124/km^{2} (321/sq mi)
- Time zone: UTC+01:00 (CET)
  - Summer (DST): UTC+02:00 (CEST)
- Postal codes: 56242
- Dialling codes: 02626
- Vehicle registration: WW
- Website: www.vielbach.de

Vielbach is an Ortsgemeinde – a community belonging to a Verbandsgemeinde – in the Westerwaldkreis in Rhineland-Palatinate, Germany.

== Geography ==
Vielbach lies 3 km south of Selters in the lower reaches of the kleiner Saynbach in the middle of woodlands and meadowlands. The community belongs to the Verbandsgemeinde of Selters, a kind of collective municipality. Its seat is in the like-named town.

== History ==
In 1315, Vielbach had its first documentary mention. The name's spelling has changed over the centuries from Villebach to Vyllebach to Vielbach.

== Politics ==
The municipal council is made up of 12 council members, as well as the honorary and presiding mayor (Ortsbürgermeister), who were elected in a majority vote in a municipal election on 13 June 2004.

== Economy and infrastructure ==
The nearest Autobahn interchange is Mogendorf on the A 3 (Cologne–Frankfurt). The nearest InterCityExpress stop is the railway station at Montabaur on the Cologne-Frankfurt high-speed rail line.
