= Marienrachdorf =

- Municipality
- Coat of arms

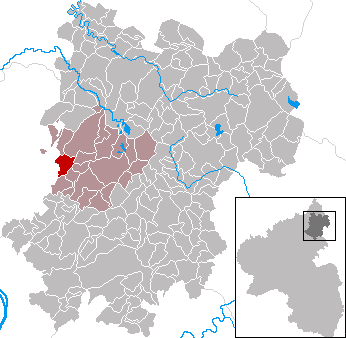
- Location of Marienrachdorf within Westerwaldkreis district
- Interactive map of Marienrachdorf
- Location within Germany Location within Rhineland-Palatinate
- Coordinates: 50°33′8″N 7°42′52″E
- Country: Germany
- State: Rhineland-Palatinate
- District: Westerwaldkreis
- Municipal assoc.: Selters (Westerwald)

Government
  - Mayor (2019–24): Dieter Klöckner

Area
  - Total: 5.04 km^{2} (1.95 sq mi)
- Elevation: 273 m (896 ft)

Population (2025-12-31)
  - Total: 1,031
  - Density: 205/km^{2} (530/sq mi)
- Time zone: UTC+01:00 (CET)
  - Summer (DST): UTC+02:00 (CEST)
- Postal codes: 56242
- Dialling codes: 02626
- Vehicle registration: WW
- Website: www.marienrachdorf.de

Marienrachdorf is an Ortsgemeinde – a community belonging to a Verbandsgemeinde – in the Westerwaldkreis in Rhineland-Palatinate, Germany.

== Geography ==
Marienrachdorf lies 4 km northwest of Selters. The community belongs to the Verbandsgemeinde of Selters, a kind of collective municipality.

== History ==
In 1190, Marienrachdorf had its first documentary mention as Rachdorf. In 1972, in the course of municipal restructuring, the Verbandsgemeinde of Selters was founded, to which Marienrachdorf belongs.

== Politics ==
The municipal council is made up of 12 council members, as well as the honorary and presiding mayor (Ortsbürgermeister), who were elected in a majority vote in a municipal election on 13 June 2004. Apportionment of seats on Council:

	WG Herkenroth	WG Klöckner	WG Haubrich	Total
2004	5	6	1	12 seats

== Clubs ==
- Kirchenchor Cäcilia (church choir)
- Musikverein 1977 Marienrachdorf e.V. (music)
- Angelsportverein Marienrachdorf (angling)
- Gymnastikverein (women's gymnastics)
- Sportverein Marienrachdorf e.V. 1921 (sport)
- Dartclub Florida

== Economy and infrastructure ==
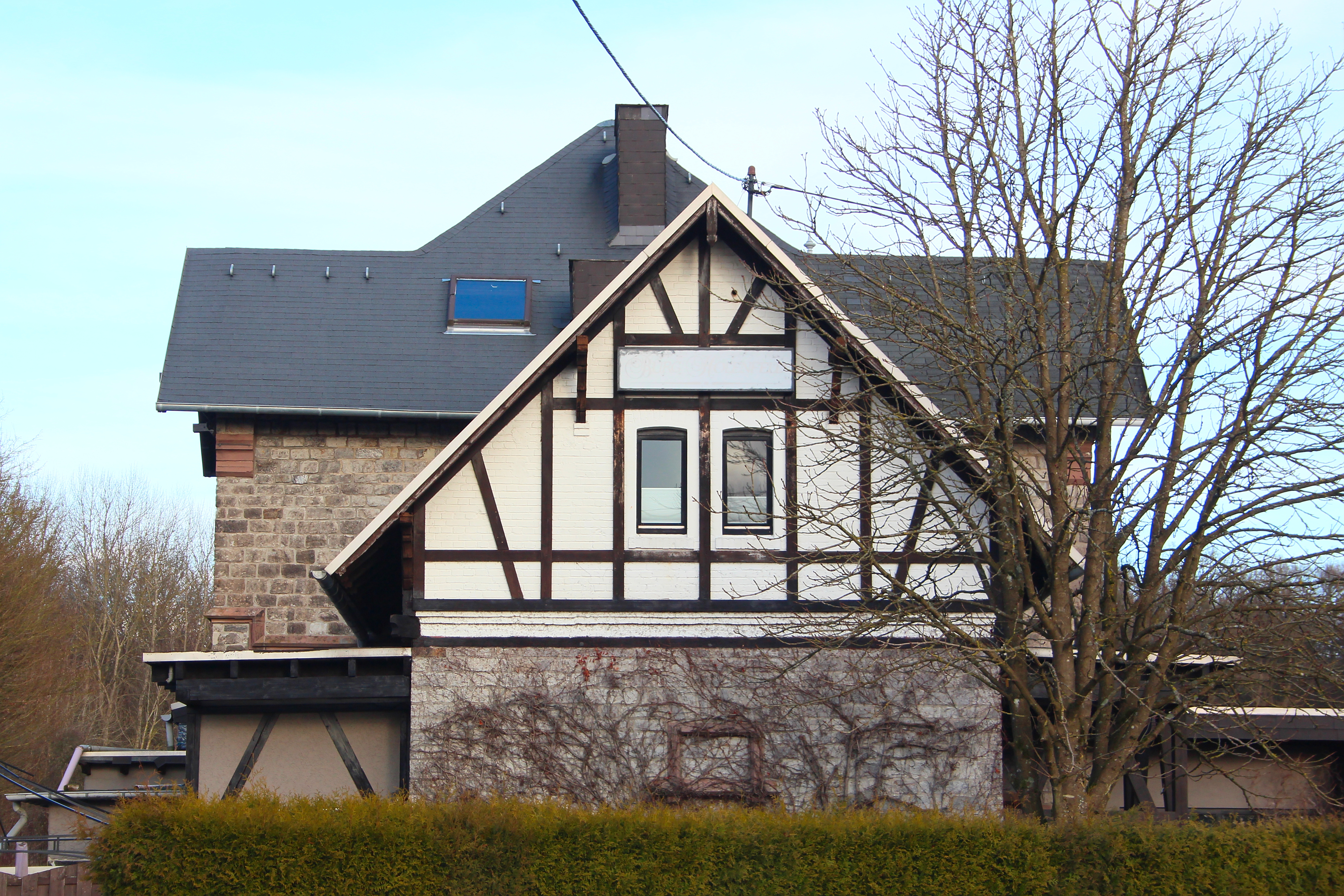
The former Marienrachdorf train station

Northwest of the community runs Bundesstraße 413, leading from Bendorf to Hachenburg. The nearest Autobahn interchange is Dierdorf on the A 3 (Cologne–Frankfurt). Marienrachdorf used to have a stop at the Engers-Au railway, but currently it is out of service, nowadays the nearest train station is Siershahn at the Lower Westerwald Railway (RB29). The nearest InterCityExpress stop is the railway station at Montabaur on the Cologne-Frankfurt high-speed rail line.
