= Weidenhahn =

- Municipality
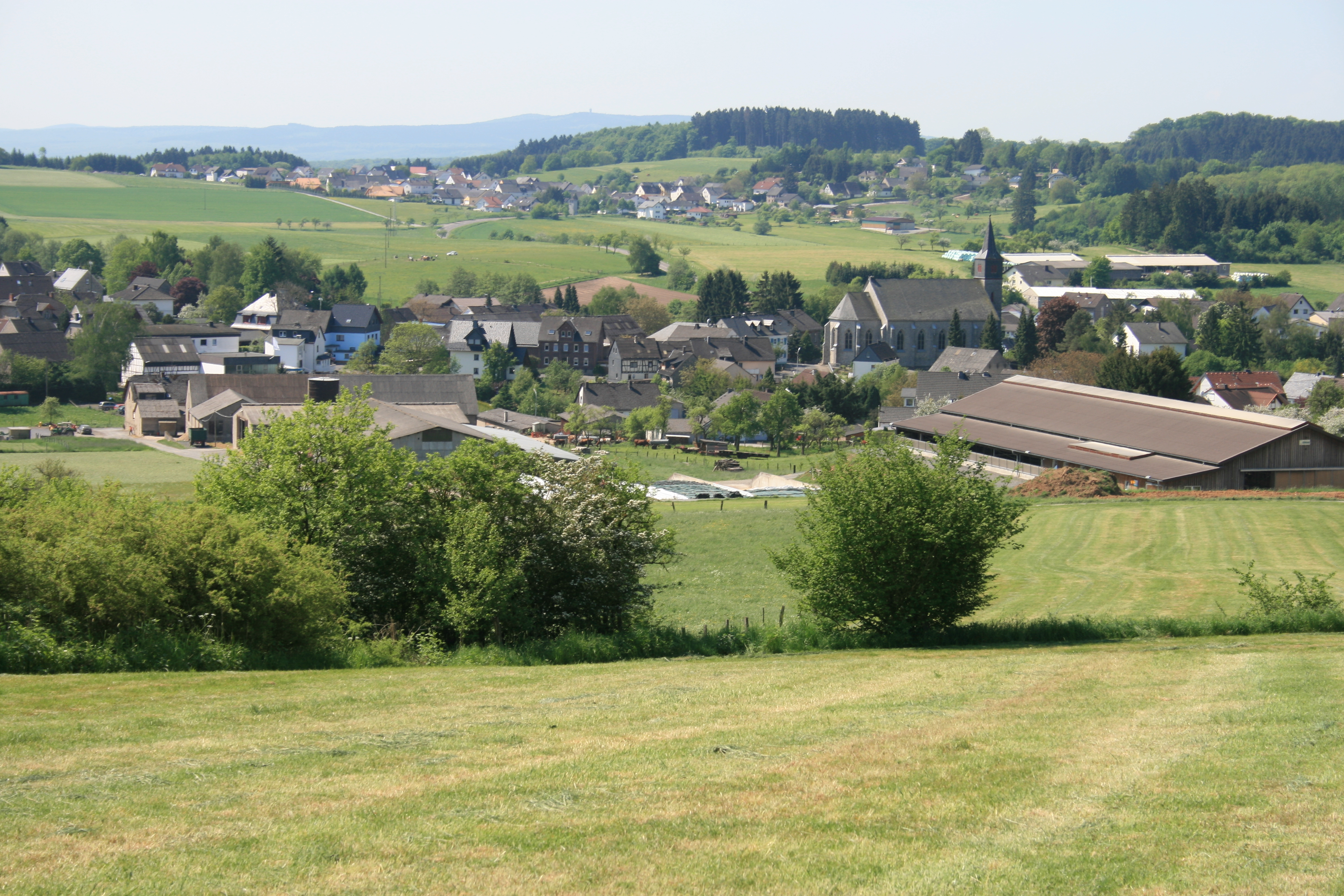
- Weidenhahn (foreground)

- Coat of arms

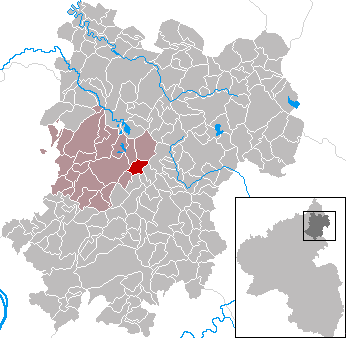
- Location of Weidenhahn within Westerwaldkreis district
- Interactive map of Weidenhahn
- Location within Germany Location within Rhineland-Palatinate
- Coordinates: 50°32′50″N 7°50′19″E
- Country: Germany
- State: Rhineland-Palatinate
- District: Westerwaldkreis
- Municipal assoc.: Selters (Westerwald)

Government
  - Mayor (2019–24): Frank Eulberg

Area
  - Total: 3.25 km^{2} (1.25 sq mi)
- Elevation: 380 m (1,250 ft)

Population (2025-12-31)
  - Total: 558
  - Density: 172/km^{2} (445/sq mi)
- Time zone: UTC+01:00 (CET)
  - Summer (DST): UTC+02:00 (CEST)
- Postal codes: 56244
- Dialling codes: 02666
- Vehicle registration: WW
- Website: www.weidenhahn.de

Weidenhahn is an Ortsgemeinde – a community belonging to a Verbandsgemeinde – in the Westerwaldkreis in Rhineland-Palatinate, Germany.

== Geography ==
The community lies 7 km northeast of Selters at the junction of Weidenbach and Steinchesbach. The community belongs to the Verbandsgemeinde of Selters, a kind of collective municipality. Its seat is in the like-named town.

== History ==
About 1200, Weidenhahn was first mentioned under the name Weidenhagen. Other names that it has had over time are Weidenhayn, Wedinhane, Weidinhan, Weidenhayn and Weidenhahn.

== Politics ==
The municipal council is made up of 16 council members, as well as the honorary and presiding mayor (Ortsbürgermeister), who were elected in a municipal election on 13 June 2004.

Seat apportionment on council:

	WG Görg	WG D. Eulberg	Total
2004	7	9	16 seats

== Economy and infrastructure ==
The community lies west of Bundesstraße 8, leading from Limburg an der Lahn to Siegburg. The nearest InterCityExpress stop is the railway station at Montabaur on the Cologne-Frankfurt high-speed rail line.
