= Krümmel =

- Municipality
- Coat of arms

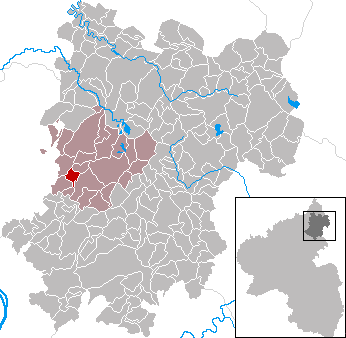
- Location of Krümmel within Westerwaldkreis district
- Interactive map of Krümmel
- Location within Germany Location within Rhineland-Palatinate
- Coordinates: 50°32′14″N 7°43′29″E
- Country: Germany
- State: Rhineland-Palatinate
- District: Westerwaldkreis
- Municipal assoc.: Selters (Westerwald)

Government
  - Mayor (2019–24): Burkhard Kuhn

Area
  - Total: 2.21 km^{2} (0.85 sq mi)
- Elevation: 260 m (850 ft)

Population (2025-12-31)
  - Total: 300
  - Density: 140/km^{2} (350/sq mi)
- Time zone: UTC+01:00 (CET)
  - Summer (DST): UTC+02:00 (CEST)
- Postal codes: 56244
- Dialling codes: 02626
- Vehicle registration: WW
- Website: www.kruemmel-ww.de

Krümmel (German pronunciation: [ˈkʁʏml̩]) is an Ortsgemeinde – a community belonging to a Verbandsgemeinde – in the Westerwaldkreis in Rhineland-Palatinate, Germany. The community belongs to the Verbandsgemeinde of Selters, a kind of collective municipality.

== Geography ==
The rural residential community of Krümmel lies 2 km west of Selters in woodland and meadowland.

== History ==
In 1022, Krümmel had its first documentary mention as Crumbele. In 1972, in the course of municipal restructuring, the Verbandsgemeinde of Selters was founded, to which Krümmel belongs.

== Politics ==
The municipal council is made up of 8 council members, including the honorary and presiding mayor (Ortsbürgermeister), who were elected in a majority vote in a municipal election on 13 June 2004.

== Economy and infrastructure ==
North of the community runs the Bundesstraße 413, leading from Bendorf to Hachenburg. The nearest Autobahn interchange is Dierdorf on the A 3 (Cologne–Frankfurt). The nearest InterCityExpress stop is the railway station at Montabaur on the Cologne-Frankfurt high-speed rail line.
