= Steinen =

Steinen is the name of several towns:

In Germany:

- Steinen, Baden-Württemberg, a town in southern Baden-Württemberg
- Steinen, Rhineland-Palatinate, a municipality in the Westerwaldkreis, Rhineland-Palatinate

In Switzerland:

- Steinen, Switzerland, a town in the Canton of Schwyz
