= Sessenhausen =

- Municipality
- Coat of arms

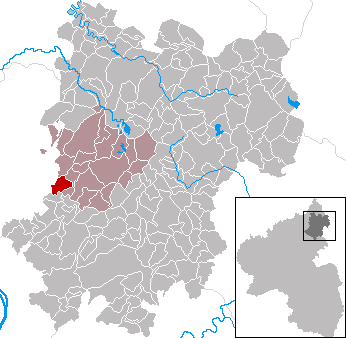
- Location of Sessenhausen within Westerwaldkreis district
- Interactive map of Sessenhausen
- Location within Germany Location within Rhineland-Palatinate
- Coordinates: 50°31′44″N 7°42′44″E
- Country: Germany
- State: Rhineland-Palatinate
- District: Westerwaldkreis
- Municipal assoc.: Selters (Westerwald)

Government
  - Mayor (2019–24): Werner Eiser

Area
  - Total: 5.45 km^{2} (2.10 sq mi)
- Elevation: 270 m (890 ft)

Population (2025-12-31)
  - Total: 865
  - Density: 159/km^{2} (411/sq mi)
- Time zone: UTC+01:00 (CET)
  - Summer (DST): UTC+02:00 (CEST)
- Postal codes: 56244
- Dialling codes: 02626
- Vehicle registration: WW
- Website: www.selters-ww.de

Sessenhausen is an Ortsgemeinde – a community belonging to a Verbandsgemeinde – in the Westerwaldkreis in Rhineland-Palatinate, Germany.

== Geography ==
The rural residential community of Sessenhausen lies 4 km west of Selters. The community belongs to the Verbandsgemeinde of Selters, a kind of collective municipality. Its seat is in the like-named town.

== History ==
In 1227, Sessenhausen had its first documentary mention as Sasinhusin. In 1758 it was mentioned as Sassenhusen, and then later as Sachsenhausen and Sassenhausen.

== Politics ==
The municipal council is made up of 12 council members, as well as the honorary and presiding mayor (Ortsbürgermeister), who were elected in a majority vote in a municipal election on 13 June 2004.

== Economy and infrastructure ==
North of the community runs Bundesstraße 413, leading from Bendorf to Hachenburg. The nearest Autobahn interchange is Dierdorf on the A 3 (Cologne–Frankfurt). The nearest InterCityExpress stop is the railway station at Montabaur on the Cologne-Frankfurt high-speed rail line.
