= Quirnbach, Westerwaldkreis =

Quirnbach
- Municipality
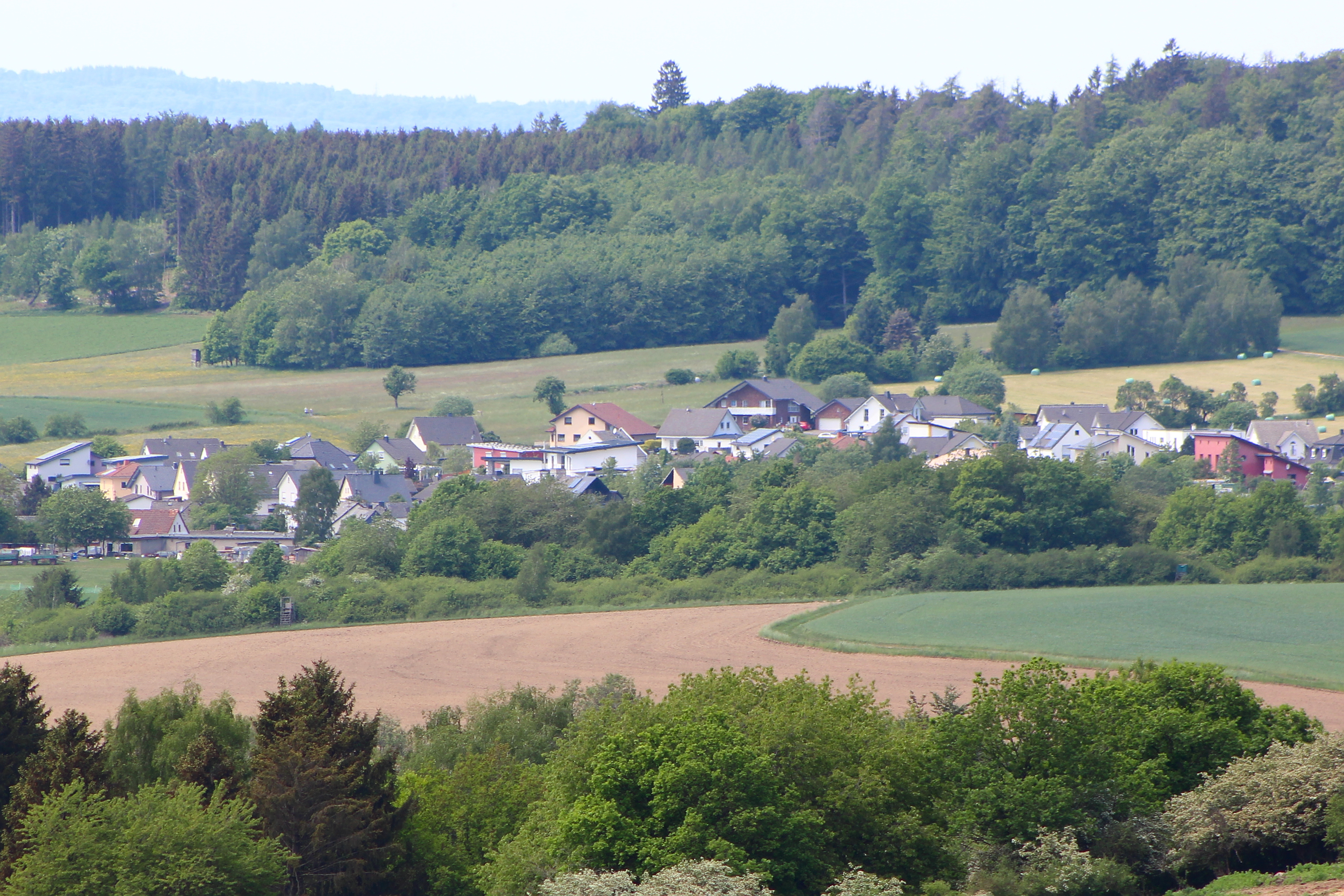

- Coat of arms

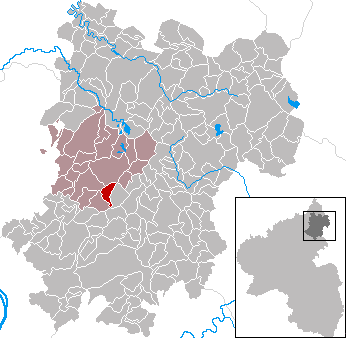
- Location of Quirnbach within Westerwaldkreis district
- Interactive map of Quirnbach
- Location within Germany Location within Rhineland-Palatinate
- Coordinates: 50°31′15″N 7°47′49″E
- Country: Germany
- State: Rhineland-Palatinate
- District: Westerwaldkreis
- Municipal assoc.: Selters (Westerwald)

Government
  - Mayor (2019–24): Uwe Schneider

Area
  - Total: 3.08 km^{2} (1.19 sq mi)
- Elevation: 300 m (980 ft)

Population (2025-12-31)
  - Total: 492
  - Density: 160/km^{2} (414/sq mi)
- Time zone: UTC+01:00 (CET)
  - Summer (DST): UTC+02:00 (CEST)
- Postal codes: 56242
- Dialling codes: 02626
- Vehicle registration: WW
- Website: www.quirnbach-westerwald.de

Quirnbach (German pronunciation: [ˈkvɪʁnbax]) is a local community belonging to an association of municipalities– in the Westerwaldkreis in Rhineland-Palatinate, Germany.

== Geography ==
Quirnbach is located 3 km southeast of Selters near Kleiner Saynbach in the middle of woodlands and meadowlands and belongs to Verbandsgemeinde of Selters. Its seat is in the like-named town.

== History ==
In 1462, Quirnbach had its first documentary mention. The name's spelling has changed over the centuries from Quirenbach to Querenbach to Quirnbach. In 1972, in the course of municipal restructuring, the Verbandsgemeinde of Selters was founded.

== Politics ==
The municipal council is made up of 8 council members, as well as the honorary and presiding mayor (Ortsbürgermeister), who were elected in a municipal election on 13 June 2004.

Seat apportionment on council:

	WG Götsch	WG Ströder	WG Stukemeier	Total
2004	3	3	2	8 seats

== Economy and infrastructure ==
The nearest Autobahn interchange is Mogendorf on the A 3 (Cologne–Frankfurt). The nearest InterCityExpress stop is the railway station at Montabaur on the Cologne-Frankfurt high-speed rail line.

== Personalities ==
Lothar Hermann who was responsible for Detection and Arrest of Adolf Eichmann, has grown up in Quirnbach.
