= Quirnbach =

Quirnbach may refer to two municipalities in Rhineland-Palatinate, Germany:

- Quirnbach, Kusel (also Quirnbach/Pfalz), in the district of Kusel
- Quirnbach, Westerwaldkreis, in the district Westerwaldkreis
