= Siershahn station =

Railway station in Germany

Siershahn
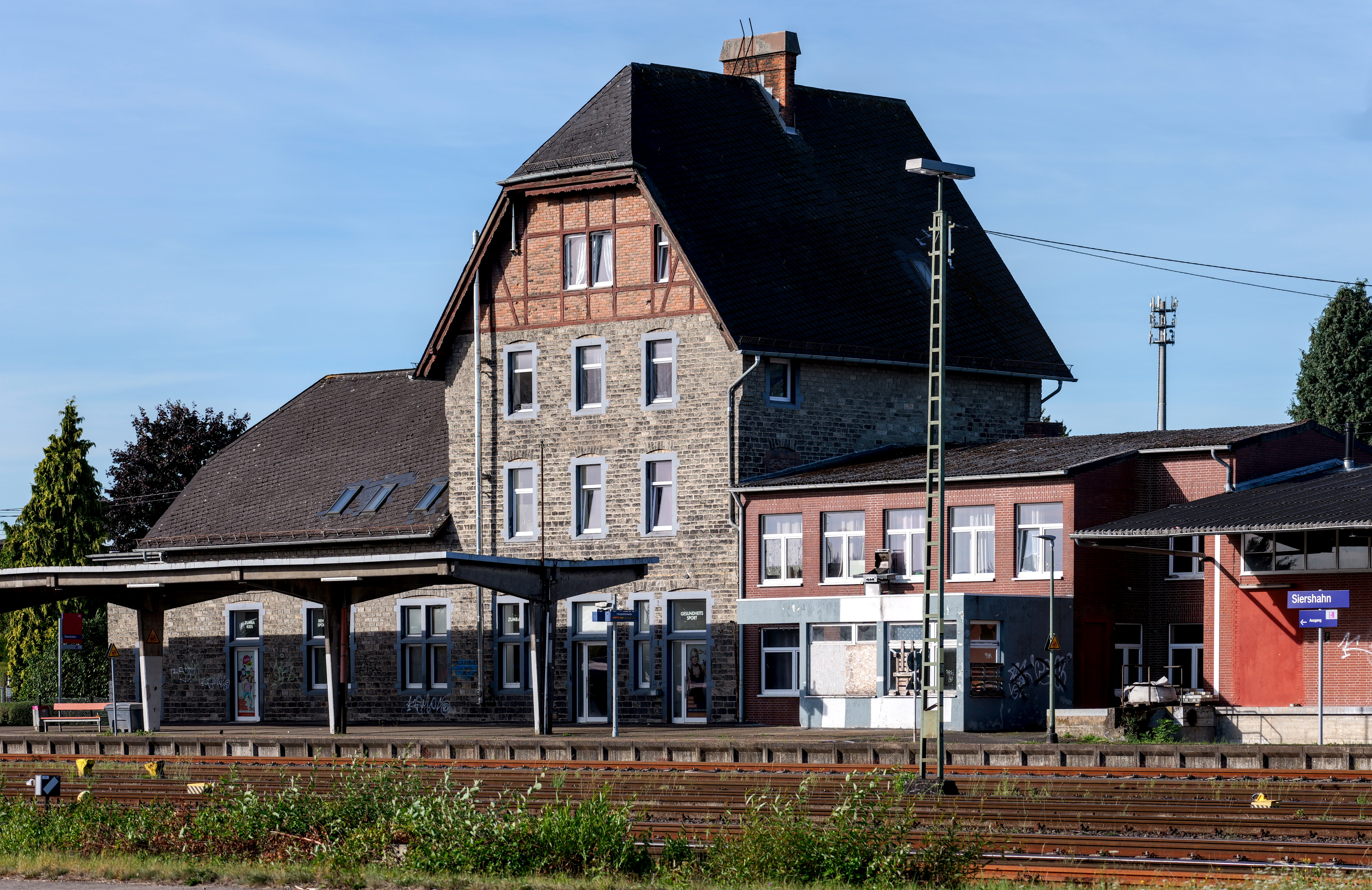
- Station building, track side (2025)

General information
- Location: Bahnhofstr. 18, Siershahn, Rhineland-Palatinate; Germany
- Coordinates: 50°29′09″N 7°46′17″E
- Lines: Engers–Au (km 21.75); Staffel–Siershahn (km 29.76)
- Platforms: 3

Construction
- Accessible: Yes

Other information
- Station code: 5848
- DS100 code: KSIH
- IBNR: 8000060
- Category: 6
- Fare zone: 420 (VRM)
- Website: www.bahnhof.de

History
- Opened: 30 May 1884

Services
Preceding station	Hessische Landesbahn	Following station
Terminus	RB 29	Wirges towards Limburg (Lahn)
Location

Siershahn station is the railway station of Siershahn in the Westerwald district of Rhineland-Palatinate. It is a local railway junction on the Staffel–Siershahn railway, which branches off here from the Engers–Au railway. Many trains on the now largely disused Grenzau–Hillscheid and Herborn–Montabaur lines also ran through to Siershahn. The station was particularly important for freight traffic (clay industry) and as the location of a locomotive depot (Bahnbetriebswerk).

== History ==
The station was opened on 30 May 1884, along with the Siershahn–Limburg and Engers–Altenkirchen sections, although a concession for it had existed since the 1870s. The station building was constructed of basalt stone, similar to other railway stations in the Westerwald region. Attached to it was the goods shed, which was later expanded. The rest of the station facilities were also very spacious. Nevertheless, the railway infrastructure was further expanded in the 1890s.

With the extension of the lines to Herborn/Westerburg (1906 to 1910) and to Hillscheid (1911), the importance of the station increased considerably. In 1913/14, the station received two signal boxes and a signalman's house. A rail weighbridge with a 30-ton capacity was also installed. The clay industry, for which the numerous railway lines had been primarily built, also expanded its production significantly. In addition, several metalworking companies were established. Consequently, many of the surrounding stations were served by transfer trains originating from Siershahn.

In the 1930s, Siershahn was upgraded from station class II to I.

During the Second World War, the station suffered severe damage; it was bombed twice in March 1945. Until after the Second World War, the station was operationally part of the Frankfurt/Main Reichsbahn Directorate and was transferred to the Mainz Reichsbahn Directorate in 1946.

Until the 1960s, Siershahn was a stop for some express train services on the Betzdorf–Altenkirchen–Siershahn–Koblenz route.

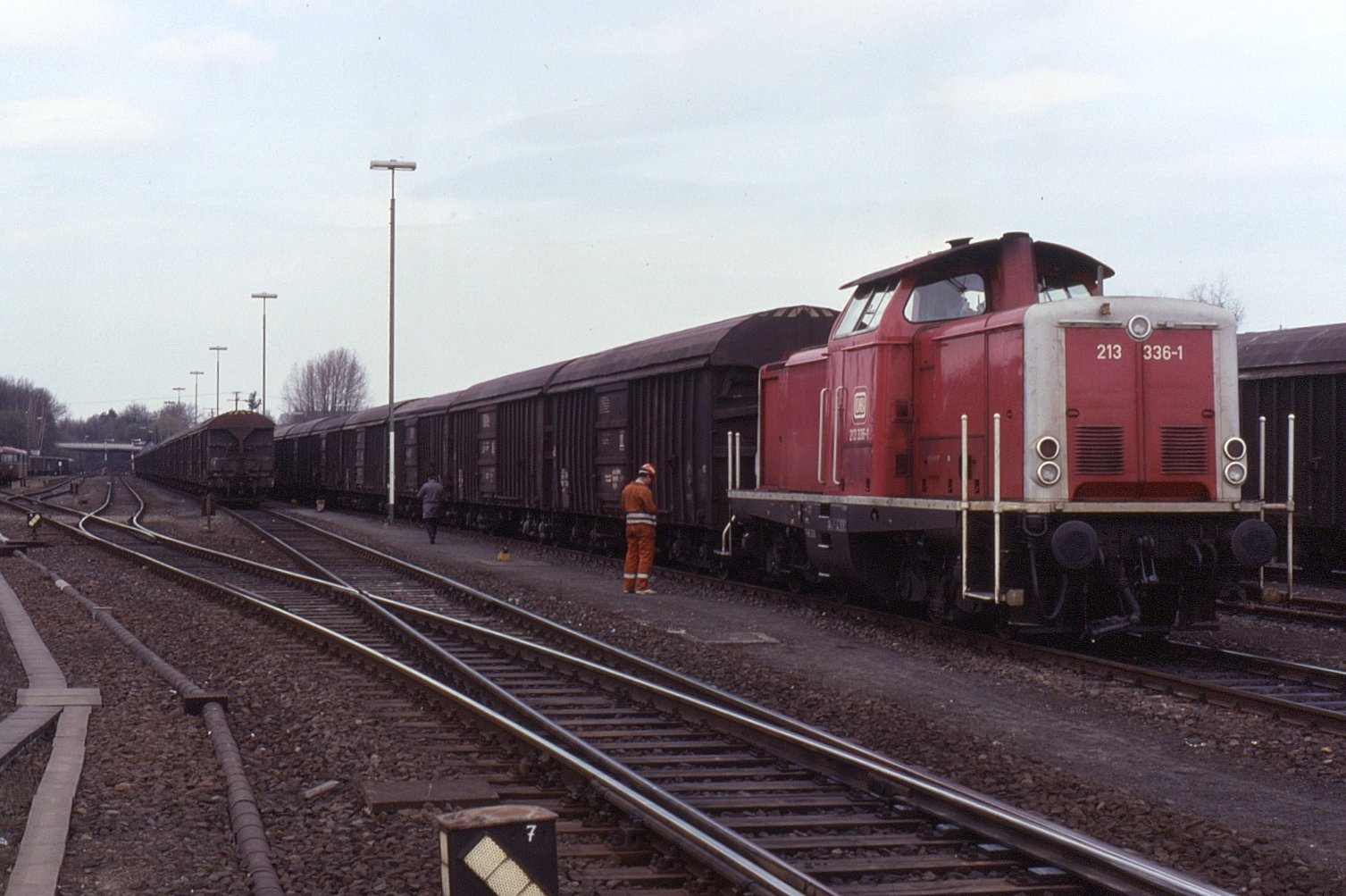
Freight train in Siershahn, unit train of sliding roof wagons hauled by a class 213 (1993)

In the 1980s, the importance of the railway station declined significantly, as passenger services on the adjacent railway lines were partially discontinued. After the cessation of passenger services to Altenkirchen in 1984 and Engers in 1989, only the connection to Limburg remains today. The considerably larger freight traffic, with the exception of clay loading and the branch line to the Schütz Works in Siershahn, ceased entirely in the 1990s. The signal box was decommissioned in 2004; the train dispatcher is now located in the former signalman's house.

=== Locomotive depot ===
The Siershahn locomotive depot was built around 1908, although other sources indicate it already existed when the line opened in 1884. Operationally, it belonged to the Altenkirchen (Westerw) locomotive depot, before the latter was closed and the Siershahn locomotive depot was assigned to the Koblenz-Mosel locomotive depot. The locomotive depot was located at the southern end of the station, between the tracks to Limburg and Engers. In addition to a four-stall roundhouse, there was also a turntable. Originally only 12 m (39 ft) in diameter, it was replaced in the 1930s or 1940s by one with a 20 m (66 ft) diameter. A planned major expansion of the roundhouse was not carried out.

From the 1990s until 2002, the site was used by a railway club. The engine shed was demolished in 2016; today the site is covered by a car park.

=== Vehicle deployment ===
In its early years, the locomotive depot used two locomotives of the class T 3, later supplemented by the class T 9.3. From then on, approximately five locomotives were always stationed in Siershahn. From the 1930s, locomotives of class 94.5-17 were used; in 1940, five locomotives of this series were also stationed in Siershahn. After the Second World War, these were replaced from 1951 onwards by newly built steam locomotives of class 82. There were also working timetables for locomotives of class 93.5-12. Only in the 1970s, shortly before the final withdrawal of class 82, were locomotives of the class 94.5-17 temporarily stationed in Siershahn again. Locomotives of class 50 and class V 60 and railbuses also arrived in Siershahn as scheduled.

== Current operations ==
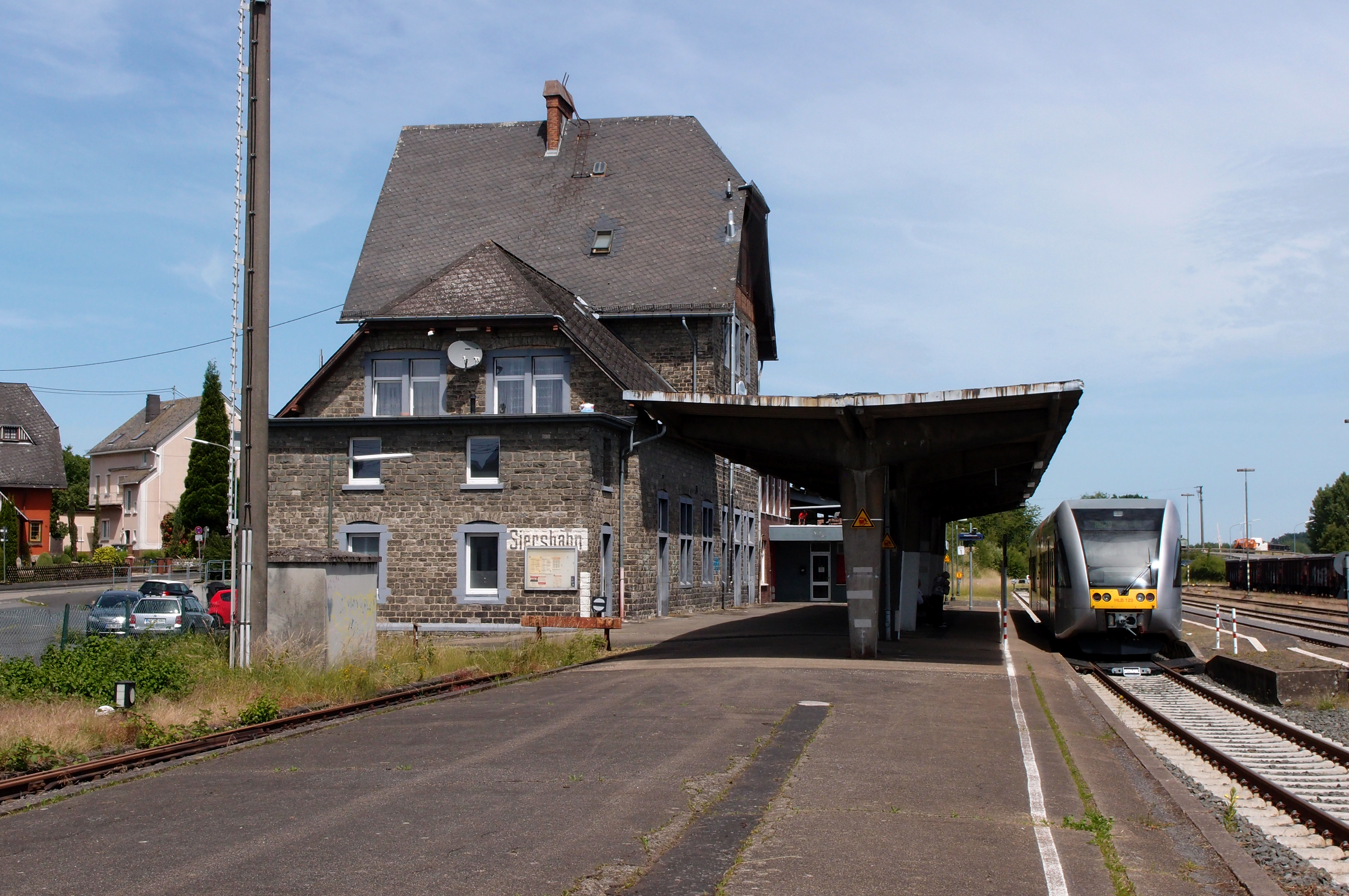
Siershahn station (2022)

=== Train ===
Train class	Route	Frequency
RB 29 Unterwesterwaldbahn	Limburg – Diez Ost – Staffel – Elz Süd – Niedererbach – Dreikirchen – Steinefrenz – Girod – Goldhausen – Montabaur – Dernbach - Wirges - Siershahn	Hourly

The station is served by the RB 29 Siershahn–Montabaur–Limburg (Lahn), of HLB, section Dreiländerbahn, approximately every hour.

Freight traffic still takes place in Siershahn today. For example, entire trains are regularly loaded with clay, which is mainly transported to Italy. The branch line of the Schütz plant in Siershahn is also used for internal transport to the main plant in Selters.

=== Local bus ===
420	Hachenburg – Hütte – Merkelbach – Wied – Höchstenbach – Mündersbach – Freirachdorf - Herschbach (Oberw.) – Rückeroth – Goddert – Selters (Westerw) – Maxsain – Nordhofen – Quirnbach – Vielbach – Mogendorf – Siershahn – Wirges – Dernbach – Eschelbach – Elgendorf – Montabaur

The local bus stop Siershahn Bahnhof, which is located next to the train station, is served by the line 420 which goes from Hachenburg via Herschbach, Selters (Westerwald), Siershahn and Wirges to Montabaur.

This line runs mostly along the former Selters - Hachenburg narrow gauge railway and the Holzbach Valley railway.

== Future ==
The Zweckverband SPNV Nord plans a new local train line from Neuwied via Bendorf, Ransbach-Baumbach, Siershahn and Wirges and Dernbach to Montabaur running on the Brexbach Valley Railway as well as the Lower Westerwald Railway.

== Sources ==
- Merzhäuser, Willi; Wenzel, Hans-Jürgen (1996). Eisenbahnen im Westerwald: zwischen Sieg und Lahn (in German). Freiburg: EK-Verlag. ISBN 3-88255-579-3.
- Wenzel, Hans-Jürgen (2018). Die Baureihe 94 - Die preußischen Tenderloks T 16 und T 16^{1} (in German). Freiburg: EK-Verlag. p. 287. ISBN 978-3-8446-6017-3.
