= Selters (Verbandsgemeinde) =

Municipality in Rhineland-Palatinate, Germany

- Verbandsgemeinde
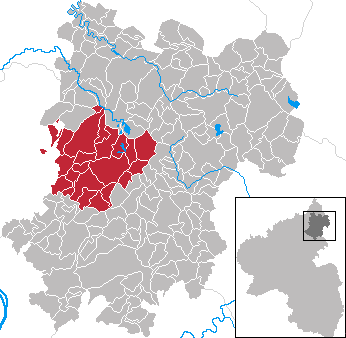
- Location of Selters within Westerwaldkreis district
- Interactive map of Selters
- Location within Germany Location within Rhineland-Palatinate
- Coordinates: 50°32′N 7°45′E
- Country: Germany
- State: Rhineland-Palatinate
- District: Westerwaldkreis
- Seat: Selters
- Subdivisions: 21 municipalities

Area
  - Total: 111.17 km^{2} (42.92 sq mi)

Population (2025-12-31)
  - Total: 16,456
  - Density: 148.03/km^{2} (383.38/sq mi)
- Time zone: UTC+01:00 (CET)
  - Summer (DST): UTC+02:00 (CEST)
- Website: www.vg-selters.de

Selters is a Verbandsgemeinde ("collective municipality") in the district Westerwaldkreis, in Rhineland-Palatinate, Germany. The seat of the Verbandsgemeinde is in Selters.

The Verbandsgemeinde Selters consists of the following Ortsgemeinden ("local municipalities"):

1. Ellenhausen
2. Ewighausen
3. Freilingen
4. Freirachdorf
5. Goddert
6. Hartenfels
7. Herschbach, Selters
8. Krümmel
9. Marienrachdorf
10. Maroth
11. Maxsain
12. Nordhofen
13. Quirnbach
14. Rückeroth
15. Schenkelberg
16. Selters
17. Sessenhausen
18. Steinen
19. Vielbach
20. Weidenhahn
21. Wölferlingen
