= Steinen, Rhineland-Palatinate =

Steinen
- Municipality
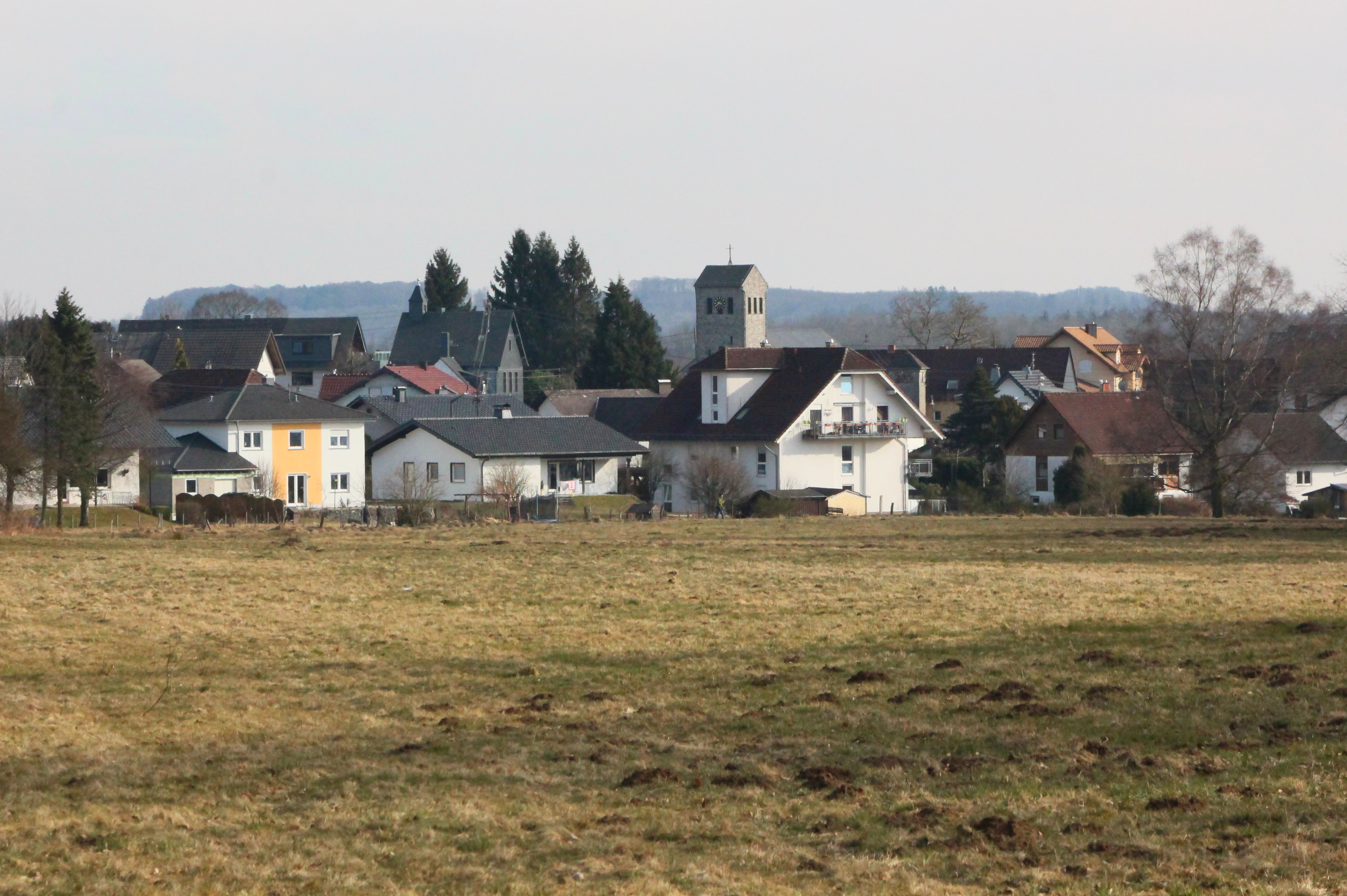

- Coat of arms

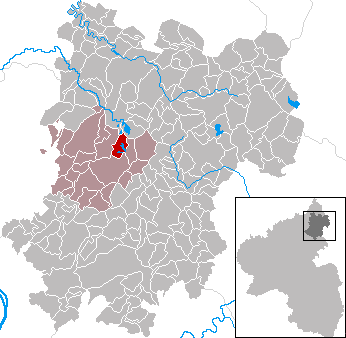
- Location of Steinen within Westerwaldkreis district
- Interactive map of Steinen
- Location within Germany Location within Rhineland-Palatinate
- Coordinates: 50°34′25″N 7°48′25″E
- Country: Germany
- State: Rhineland-Palatinate
- District: Westerwaldkreis
- Municipal assoc.: Selters (Westerwald)

Government
  - Mayor (2019–24): Mario Reifenberg

Area
  - Total: 4.22 km^{2} (1.63 sq mi)
- Elevation: 410 m (1,350 ft)

Population (2025-12-31)
  - Total: 206
  - Density: 48.8/km^{2} (126/sq mi)
- Time zone: UTC+01:00 (CET)
  - Summer (DST): UTC+02:00 (CEST)
- Postal codes: 56244
- Dialling codes: 02626
- Vehicle registration: WW
- Website: www.steinen-westerwald.de

Steinen (German pronunciation: [ˈʃtaɪnən]) is an Ortsgemeinde – a community belonging to a Verbandsgemeinde – in the Westerwaldkreis in Rhineland-Palatinate, Germany.

== Geography ==
Steinen lies 5 km from Herschbach and 7 km from Selters on the Westerwald Lake Plateau. In the contest Unser Dorf soll schöner werden - unser Dorf hat Zukunft ("Our village should be lovelier – our village has a future"), Steinen has been recognized several times. It belongs to the Verbandsgemeinde of Selters, a kind of collective municipality. Its seat is in the town of the same name.

== Politics ==
The municipal council is made up of 13 council members, and the honorary, presiding mayor (Ortsbürgermeister).
