= Mogendorf =

- Municipality
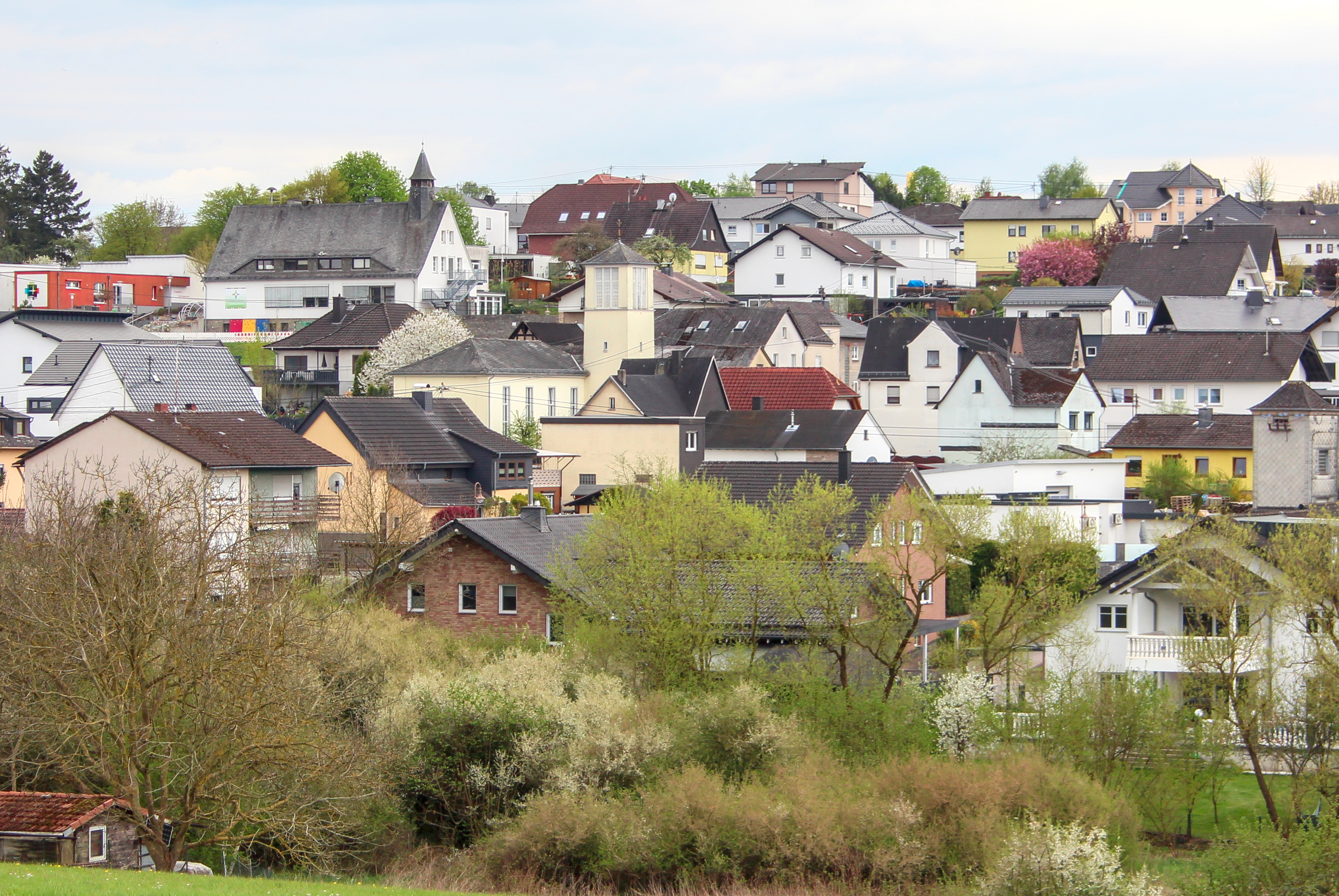

- Coat of arms

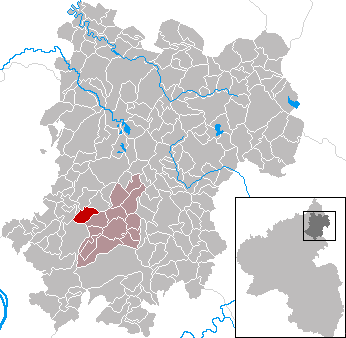
- Location of Mogendorf within Westerwaldkreis district
- Interactive map of Mogendorf
- Location within Germany Location within Rhineland-Palatinate
- Coordinates: 50°29′40″N 7°45′35″E
- Country: Germany
- State: Rhineland-Palatinate
- District: Westerwaldkreis
- Municipal assoc.: Wirges

Government
  - Mayor (2024–29): Manuel Hemmerling

Area
  - Total: 4.24 km^{2} (1.64 sq mi)
- Elevation: 290 m (950 ft)

Population (2025-12-31)
  - Total: 1,285
  - Density: 303/km^{2} (785/sq mi)
- Time zone: UTC+01:00 (CET)
  - Summer (DST): UTC+02:00 (CEST)
- Postal codes: 56424
- Dialling codes: 02623
- Vehicle registration: WW
- Website: www.mogendorf.de

Mogendorf is a municipality in Westerwaldkreis district, Rhineland-Palatinate, in western Germany.

== Geography ==
Mogendorf is located in a valley in the southwestern part of the Westerwald mountains and within the boundaries of the Kannenbäckerland, which is well-known for clay mining and its porcelain industry. It is located northeast of the Montabaur Heights, a 15 km-long mountain ridge, which serves as a rainshadow for the area. With the entire region being prone to westerly winds, the ridge spares the settlement from heavy convective storms during summertime, which usually divert to the north and south. Mogendorf experiences an oceanic climate (Köppen classification Cfb), which is warmer than in the rest of the region due to its relatively low altitude and proximity to the Middle Rhine. Its unique location allows warmer air from the deep valley to encroach up the westernmost slopes of the Lower Westerwald and reach the lowlands of the Kannenbäckerland. A variety of thermophilic plants and fruits, which are rather uncommon in the area, can be grown in the village.

Since 1971, Mogendorf is administered as part of the Wirges municipality.

== History ==
The settlement was first mentioned in 1384 under the name of 'Oberdorf' (translated: Upper Village) within the Nassau-Dillenburg province of the Holy Roman Empire. Due to its location on the Rhinish salt road, the area was considered to be an ideal location for permanent settlement. The settlement saw a rapid decline in population during Thirty Years' War, which started to sustainably recover during the 17th century. In 1696, the first settlement of Ashkenazi Jews in the village was recorded.

Due to the Year Without a Summer and its subsequent, long-lasting effects, which included crop failure, Mogendorf became the scene of heavy emigration to the United States, which lasted until the early 20th century.

During the rule of the Nazi regime, Mogendorf became the scene of brutal pogroms, during which SA officers unsuccessfully attempted to burn down the local synagogue. In total, 22 Jews were killed after being deported into concentration camps in Eastern Europe. Only two Jewish families from Mogendorf managed to go abroad. At the end of World War II, the local Jewish community completely ceased to exist.

== Politics ==
Results of the 2025 German federal election in Mogendorf:

2025 German federal election
	percent
CDU	29.0%
AfD	27.8%
SPD	16.6%
FDP	6.2%
BSW	5.5%
Greens	4.5%
Free Voters	1.4%
others	9.1%

Results of the 2024 European Parliament election in Mogendorf:

2024 European Parliament election
	percent
CDU	24.8%
AfD	23.6%
SPD	16.1%
FDP	7.8%
Greens	5.4%
BSW	4.8%
others	17.6%

During the 2024 local elections, three parties and election groups ran for the village council, with all achieving mandates. The village council composition is as follows:

2024 village council election
	percent
Freie Wähler Gruppe (Free Voters Group)	43.04%
Bürger für Mogendorf (Citizens for Mogendorf)	40.04%
SPD	16.92%

Manuel Hemmerling won the mayor election in a runoff, defeating Bernd Altwasser in the second round. Hemmerling overtook mayor duties in late August 2024.

== Infrastructure ==
=== Transport ===
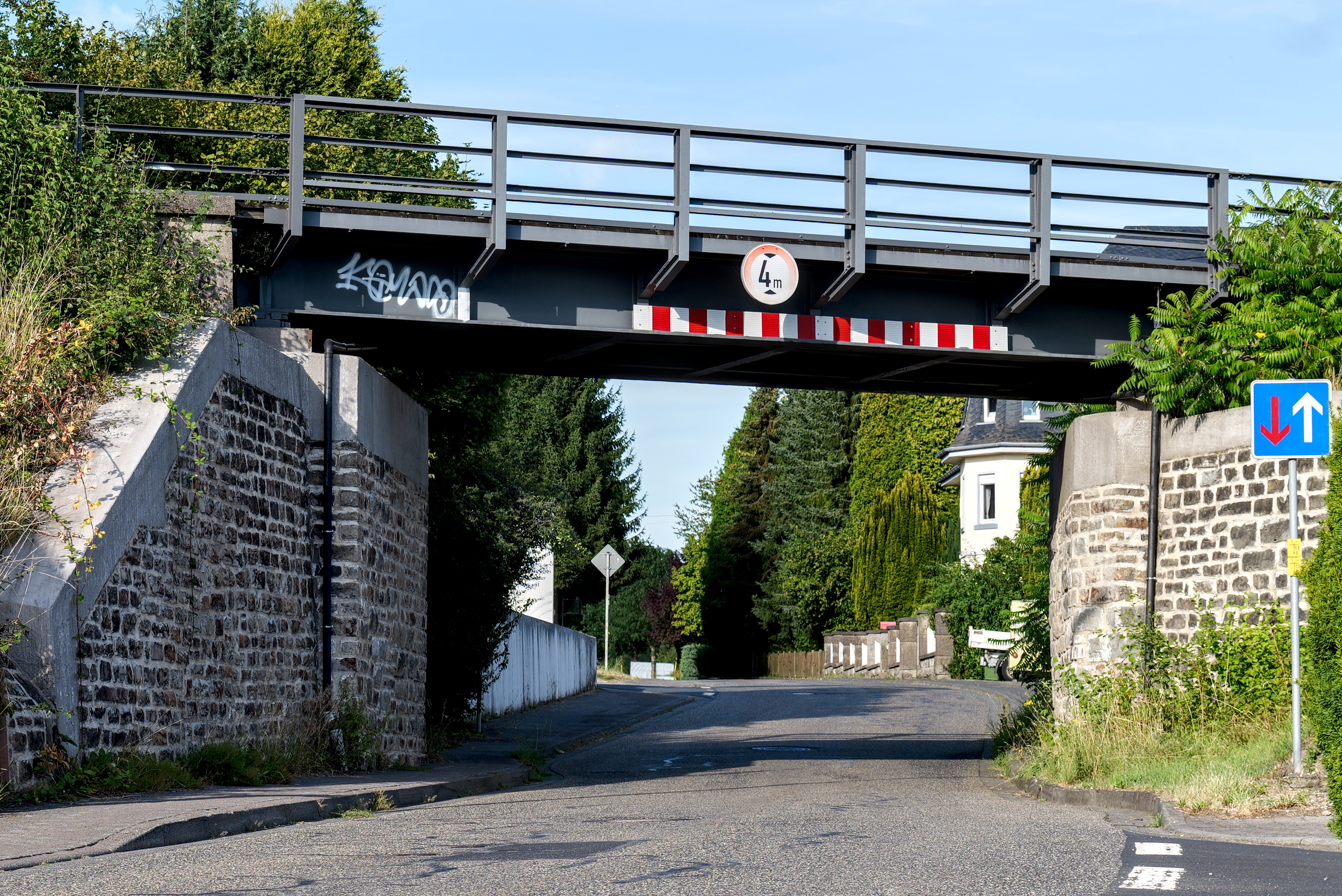
Bridge of the Engers-Au railway in Mogendorf

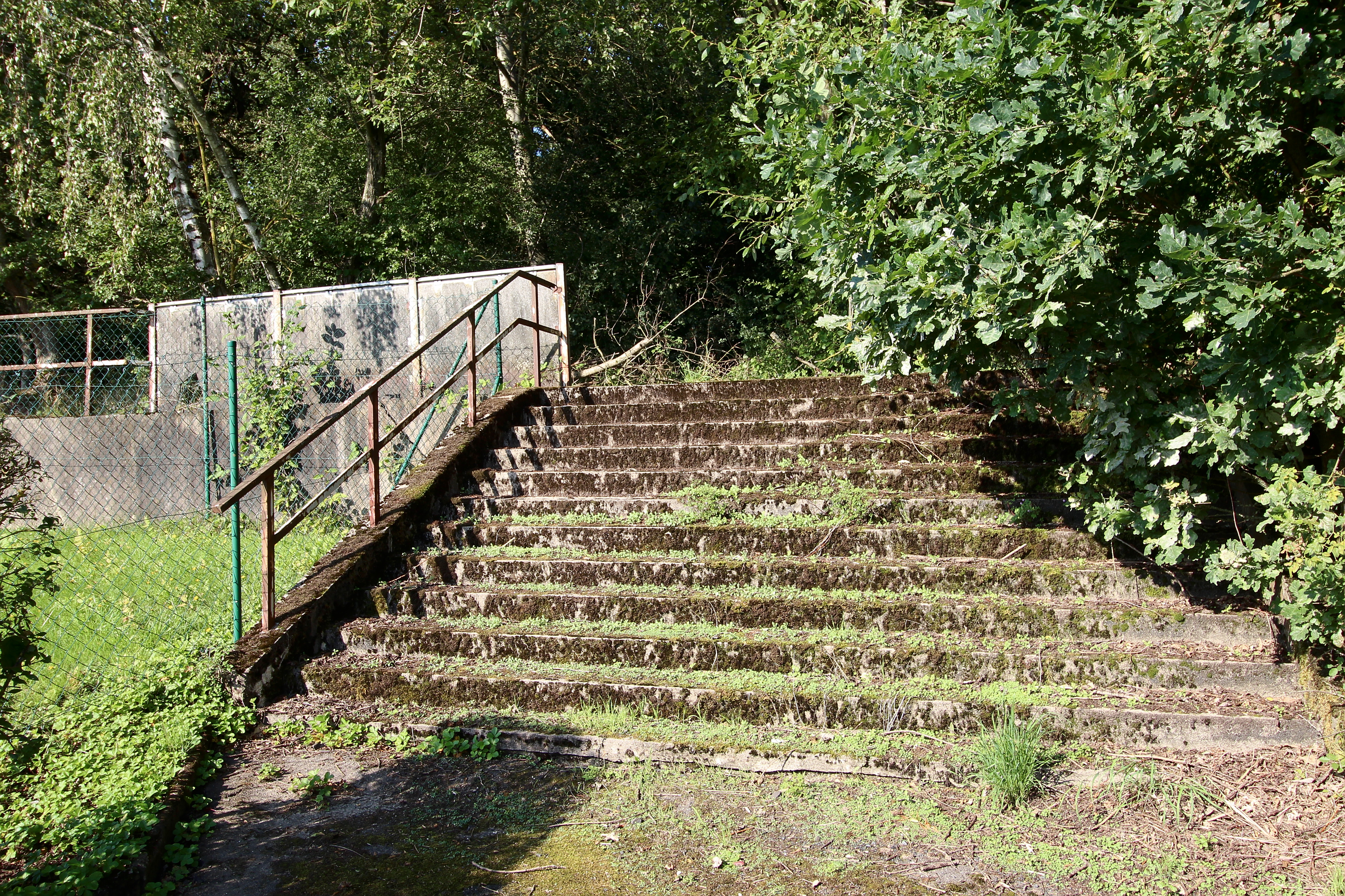
Stairway to former Mogendorf train stop

Mogendorf is connected to the local bus lines, 420, 421, 424 and 429.

Mogendorf is located on the six-lane A3 motorway and has an own intersection, from where Frankfurt am Main and Cologne can be reached within an hour. Mogendorf used to have a stop at the Engers-Au railway, but currently it is out of service; nowadays, the nearest train station is Siershahn at the Lower Westerwald Railway (RB29).

Local busses are serving Mogendorf, the village is located on the area of the transport association Verkehrsverbund Rhein-Mosel (VRM) zones 420 and 426. The Montabaur station is located 12 km (7.5 miles) southeast from Mogendorf.

=== Business area ===
While in the village of Mogendorf almost no business infrastructure is available, a business area has been constructed at the motorway exit which includes a fuel station, a large parking lot, a restaurant, an accommodation and quick service restaurants of McDonalds, Burger King and Kentucky Fried Chicken (KFC).
