= Selters, Rhineland-Palatinate =

Selters
- Town
- Coat of arms

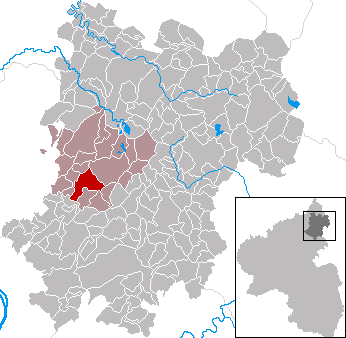
- Location of Selters within Westerwaldkreis district
- Interactive map of Selters
- Location within Germany Location within Rhineland-Palatinate
- Coordinates: 50°31′56″N 7°45′26″E
- Country: Germany
- State: Rhineland-Palatinate
- District: Westerwaldkreis
- Municipal assoc.: Selters (Westerwald)

Government
  - Mayor (2019–24): Rolf Jung

Area
  - Total: 8.7 km^{2} (3.4 sq mi)
- Elevation: 248 m (814 ft)

Population (2025-12-31)
  - Total: 2,927
  - Density: 340/km^{2} (870/sq mi)
- Time zone: UTC+01:00 (CET)
  - Summer (DST): UTC+02:00 (CEST)
- Postal codes: 56242
- Dialling codes: 02626
- Vehicle registration: WW
- Website: www.stadt-selters-westerwald.de

Selters (German pronunciation: [ˈzɛltɐs]) is a town in the Westerwaldkreis in Rhineland-Palatinate, Germany. It serves as the seat of the Verbandsgemeinde of Selters, a collective municipality.

== Geography ==
The town is located in the Westerwald between Koblenz and Siegen, roughly 12 km northwest of Montabaur, and 25 km northeast of Koblenz.

== History ==
In 1194/1198, Selters was first mentioned in a document as Saltres. On 9 November 1938, the synagogue was burnt down. In October 1939, Selters was “Jew-free”. Only the Jewish graveyard on the Wacht still bears witness to the Jews’ history in Selters. On 15 October 2000, the then community of Selters, by decision of the Ministry of the Interior and Sport, was granted town rights.

== Religion ==
=== Catholic Church ===
The Roman Catholic parish of Saint Boniface has existed only since the late 19th century. In 1892, the parish’s own church was consecrated, which was built in neo-Gothic style. In November 1965, owing to the church building’s unsoundness, it was torn down, and on the land a new, modern church was built. Beneath this church is found the parish centre with meeting and event rooms. In the parish church, the relics of Saint Gabriel of Our Lady of Sorrows are kept and worshipped. Particular stress is the devotion to church music and youth work. Many musical groups busy themselves, without pay, in the parish and enrich church services with their musical pieces. Since August 2009, the priest Marcus W. Fischer has headed the parish.

=== Evangelical Church ===
The Evangelical parish in Selters has owned its own church since 1842. This building’s side wings also housed the Selters elementary school until 1958. The same rooms are now used by the town administration. In 1850, the Evangelical parish got its first pastor. In 1963, a kindergarten and a parish centre were dedicated. Since 2006, Mr. Wehrmann has been the one responsible for leading the parish.

== Politics ==
The town council is made up of 22 council members, who were elected in a municipal election on 13 June 2004. The council is presided over by the honorary mayor (Ortsbürgermeister).

Apportionment of seats on town council:

	SPD	CDU	BLS	Total
2004	5	10	7	22 seats

== Economy and infrastructure ==
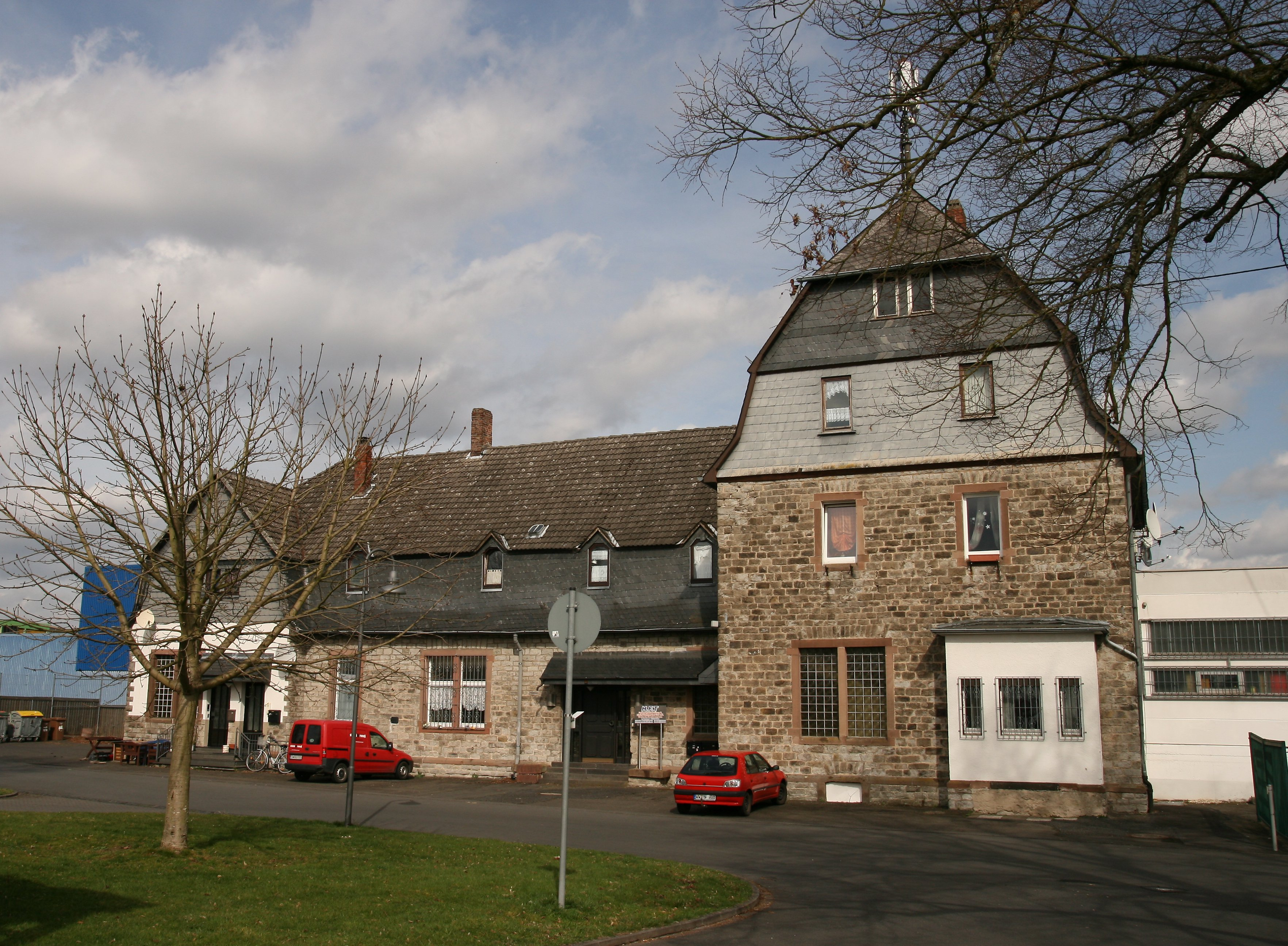
Former Selters (Westerw) station

Selters access to the public local bus transport is through the lines 417, 421, 422, 423 and 461.

Selters is located in the area of the transport association Verkehrsverbund Rhein-Mosel (VRM), in the zone number 435.

The town lies west of Bundesstraße 8, leading from Limburg an der Lahn to Siegburg. Selters also lies right near the Autobahns A 3 (Cologne–Frankfurt) and A 48 (to Koblenz).

Selters is located on the Engers–Au railway line, which nowadays is only served by fright trains. Selters in the past also was located on the Selters–Hachenburg narrow gauge railway via Höchstenbach, Hattert and Müschenbach to Hachenburg.

The nearest InterCityExpress stop is the railway station at Montabaur on the Cologne–Frankfurt high-speed rail line.

== Notable people ==
- John Peter Altgeld (1847–1902), served as the 20th Governor of Illinois from 1893-1897.
- Maria Friedrich-Boerger (1959), Foreign Service Officer

== Sources ==
Landjuden in Selters/Westerwald. In: Nassauische Annalen, Bd. 108. Wiesbaden 1997, S. 169-183. Erinnern für die Zukunft. 60 Jahre nach der Befreiung von der Nazi-Herrschaft im Westerwald
