= Cologne–Frankfurt high-speed rail line =

High-speed rail line in Germany

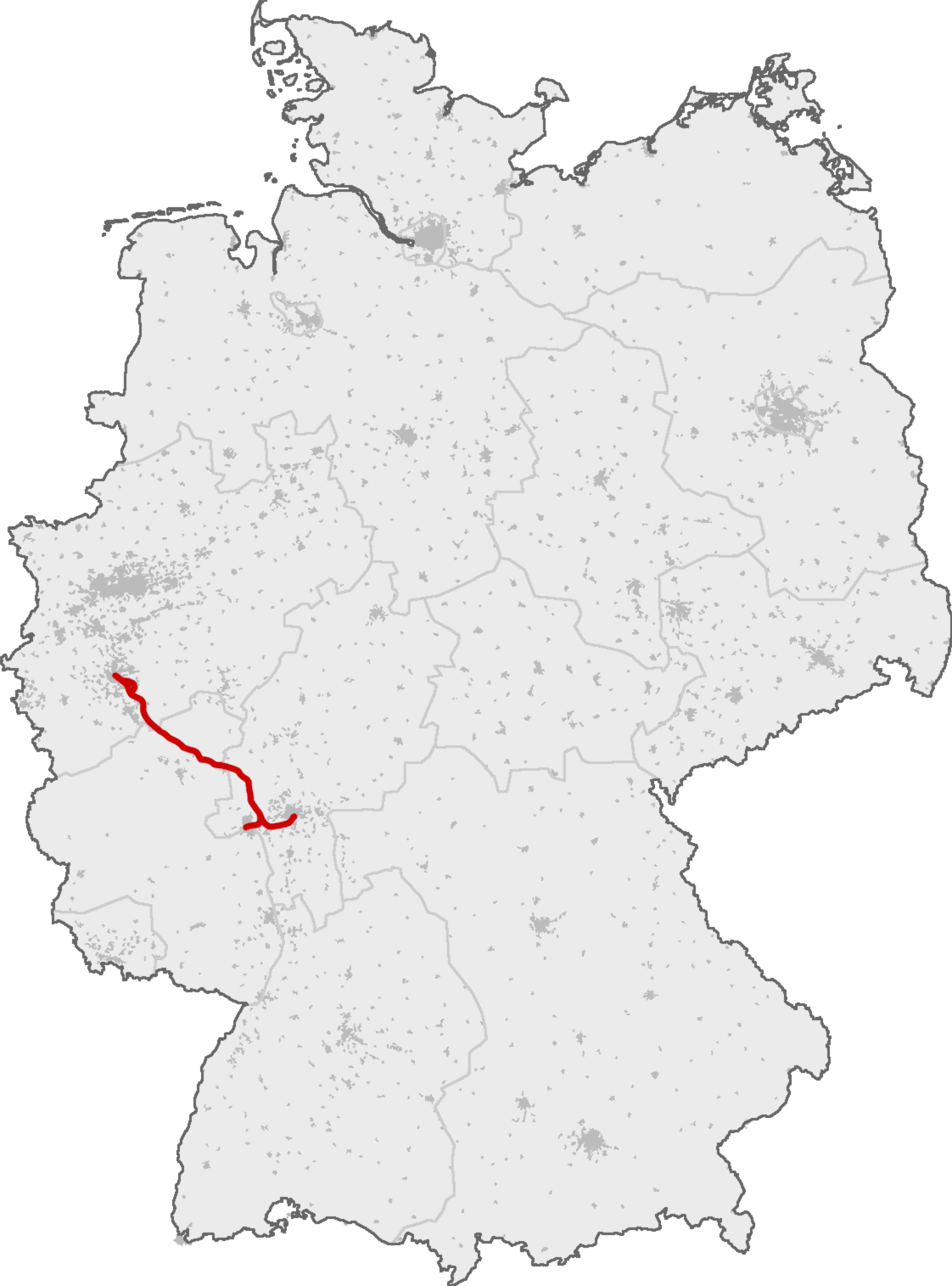

Overview
- Native name: Neubaustrecke Köln-Rhein/Main
- Status: Operational
- Line number: 2651 Köln-Deutz (h)–Köln Steinstr; 2660 Köln-Deutz (t)–Köln Gummersbacher Str; 2690 Köln Steinstr–Frankfurt (Main) Stadion; 3509 Breckenheim–Wiesbaden-Kinzenberg; 3656 Frankfurt (Main) Flughfn–Zeppelinheim
- Locale: North Rhine-Westphalia, Rhineland-Palatinate and Hesse, Germany

Service
- Route number: 472
- Rolling stock: ICE 3, ICE 4

History
- Completed: 2002

Technical
- Line length: 180 km (110 mi)
- Number of tracks: 2
- Track gauge: 1,435 mm (4 ft 8 1/2 in) standard gauge
- Minimum radius: 3,320 m (3,630 yd)
- Electrification: 15 kV/16.7 Hz AC Overhead catenary
- Operating speed: Majority: 300 km/h (186 mph); Parts of the line: 200 km/h (125 mph)
- Signalling: LZB (current), ETCS Level 2 (from 2028)
- Maximum incline: 4%

The Cologne–Frankfurt high-speed rail line (German: Schnellfahrstrecke Köln–Rhein/Main) is a 180-kilometre-long (110 mi) high-speed line in Germany, connecting the cities of Cologne and Frankfurt. Its route follows the Bundesautobahn 3 for the greater part, and currently the travel time is about 62 minutes. The line's grades of up to four percent require trains with a high power-to-weight ratio which is currently only met by third-generation and fourth-generation Intercity-Express trains, with the latter operating at reduced speeds. It was constructed between 1995 and 2002 at a total cost of six billion euro according to Deutsche Bahn.

== Operational use ==
The line starts in Cologne at the Abzweig Köln-Steinstrasse in the Cologne borough of Porz. Whilst the connection loop to Cologne-Bonn Airport, the Cologne Airport loop, is technically not a part of the high-speed line, it was built as a part of the general refurbishments in the Cologne area due to the line, and hence is generally regarded as part of the project. The line has four stations, Siegburg/Bonn, Montabaur, Limburg Süd and Frankfurt Airport. The line is equipped for speeds up to 300 km/h (186 mph) between Siegburg and Frankfurt, closely following the A3 autobahn.

== History ==
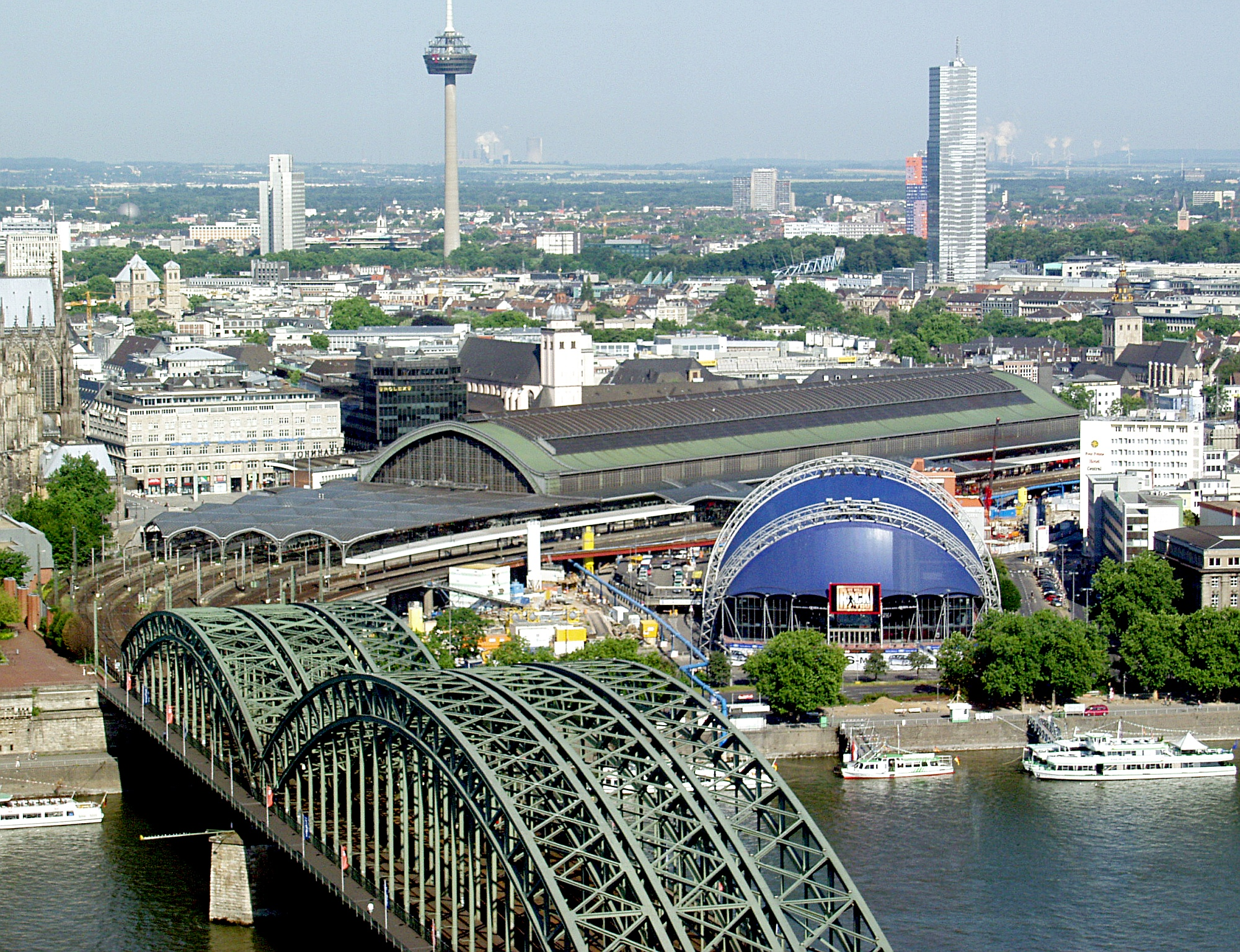
Köln Hauptbahnhof

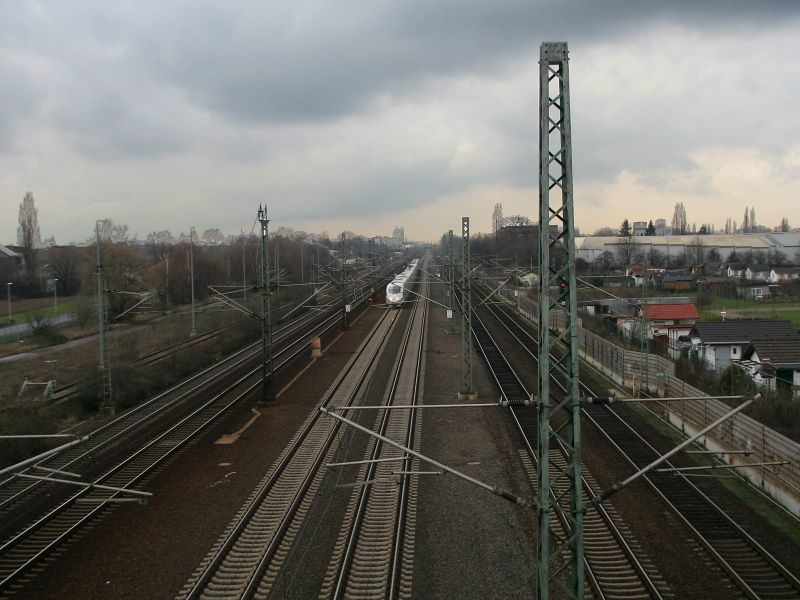
Six track section near Porz

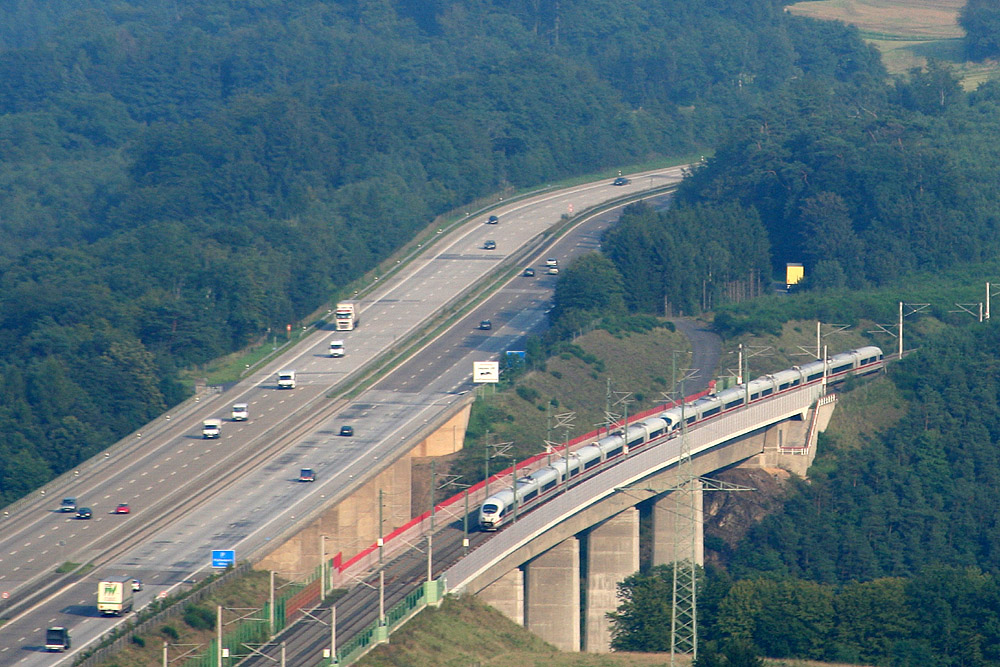
Wied viaduct

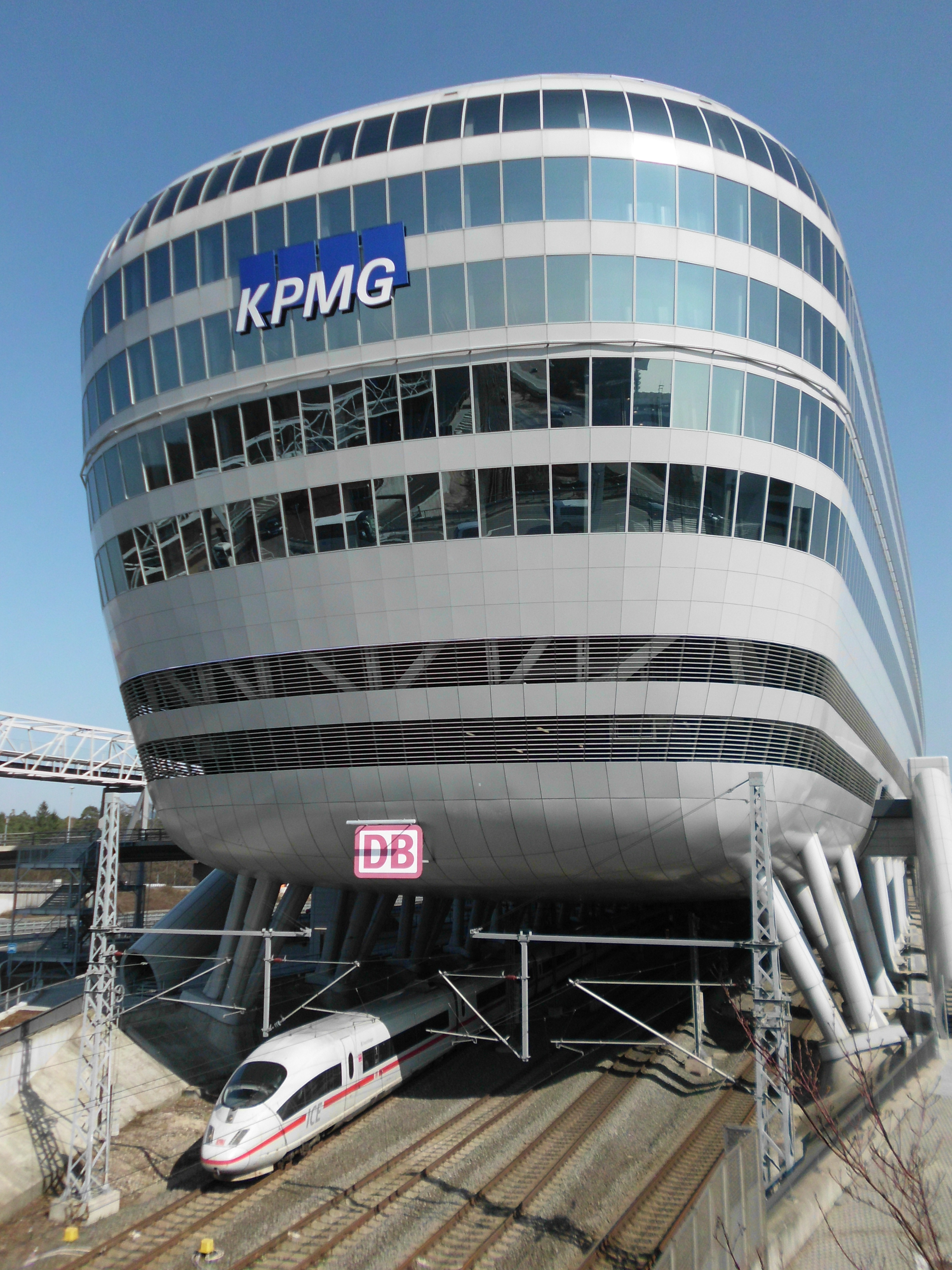
ICE 3 departing westward from Frankfurt Airport long-distance station underneath The Squaire

The former Deutsche Bundesbahn (DB) began planning for a network of high-speed lines for both passenger and freight trains in the 1960s. The 1973 federal transport plan included a high-speed line between Cologne and Groß-Gerau (near Frankfurt), as well as between Hanover and Würzburg and between Mannheim and Stuttgart. This plan envisaged that mixed traffic would require:

- maximum grade of 1.25% (occasionally 2.0%)
- curves with small superelevation and minimum radii of 4.8 to 7.0 kilometres (3.0 to 4.3 mi)
- maximum line speed of 300 km/h (186 mph)

These specifications would be difficult to achieve either near the traditional Rhine valley route, which follows an entrenched meander, or along DB's preferred route next to the A3, which has long and steep climbs and descents. The second federal transport plan in 1985 (which was drawn up when the first TGV line had been operating for four years) included a passenger train-only railway, which meant that much steeper grades would be acceptable. The technical standards adopted were:

- maximum grade : 4.0%
- minimum radius : 3.35 kilometres (2.08 mi)
- maximum speed : 300 km/h (186 mph)

DB negotiated with the states of North Rhine-Westphalia, Rhineland-Palatinate and Hesse over the route. Each state had objections to the bypassing of the cities on the Rhine, particularly Bonn, Andernach, Koblenz, Mainz and Wiesbaden and four other routes were examined that passed through some of these. No agreement was reached and the Federal Cabinet agreed on 20 December 1989 to a recommendation of the Transport Minister to adopt the A3 route and, among other things, to include a station at Limburg.

DB then consulted with the states and community groups over the details of the route. In North Rhine-Westphalia there was considerable debate over the location of the station to serve the Bonn area and on how to serve the Cologne-Bonn Airport. DB decided that the station would be built at Siegburg and that a separate, double line would connect Cologne and the high-speed line to the south with Cologne-Bonn airport for the S-Bahn and ICE traffic. In Rhineland-Palatinate, DB decided that a station would be built north of Montabaur only 21 kilometres (13 mi) north of Limburg Sud, partly to serve Koblenz via the A48, and to reroute a local railway through it.

In Hesse, DB decided to build the Limburg station south of the town at its current location on cost grounds, even though this prevented a connection to the Lahn valley line, which would have provided a connection to Koblenz and Gießen. Options for connections to Wiesbaden were examined in detail, including routing the line through its eastern outskirts. DB eventually agreed to a double-line spur to Wiesbaden along the A66. Options for connections to Frankfurt Airport, the line to Frankfurt Hauptbahnhof and to the Riedbahn (the line to Mannheim). It was decided that routing the line into the existing Frankfurt Airport station (now known as the regional train station) with two 400-metre-long (440 yd) tracks and a 200-metre-long (220 yd) track would not be adequate, even if expanded to four or five tracks. DB decided that a separate station across the A3 from the old station would be required and that the line would go on to connect to the Riedbahn both northbound (towards Frankfurt) and southbound (towards Mannheim).

=== Planning ===
Although the route as set out above was adopted under the federal railway development law on 15 November 1993, the last legal challenge to the project was not resolved until September 1998. In the meantime DB decided to reduce the minimum radius of curves to 3.320 kilometres (2.063 mi) and increased the maximum super-elevation of the track to 180 millimetres (7 1/16 in) (to follow the A3 more closely), reduced the spacing between tracks from 4.70 to 4.50 metres (15 ft 5 in to 14 ft 9 in) (to save space) and increased the area of tunnel cross-sections from 82 to 92 square metres (880 to 990 sq ft) (to allow higher speeds for converging trains). The route as finally designed was intended to allow trains to cover the distance between Cologne and Frankfurt in 58 minutes, although the fastest time in 2023 is 66 minutes served by an ICE Sprinter service, and only supposed to be reduced to 64 minutes by the Deutschlandtakt.

=== Construction ===
The construction of the route began on 13 December 1995 with the turning of the first sod at the Frankfurter Kreuz autobahn junction and the last dispute over the route was settled in May 1997. On 13 May Federal Minister of Transport Matthias Wissmann in Siegburg turned the first sod in North Rhine-Westphalia. The last section to commence construction was the Schloss-Röttgen tunnel on the Cologne-Bonn airport loop, which was required in the settlement of a law case: work on it commenced in December 2000. The first section completed was the new Frankfurt airport station, which went into operation on 30 May 1999.

The opening of the whole route, which had originally been planned for 1999, took place after numerous court challenges and geological problems, at the end of July 2002. The last tracks of the route in the Schulwald tunnel were installed on 10 July 2001. In the same month the first trips with diesel locomotives were run to adjust the height of the overhead electric lines on the southern section. On 22 October 2001 for the first time an ICE 3 ran on the line, on a 37-kilometre-long (23 mi) section between Frankfurt airport and Idstein.

During construction, traffic on the neighbouring A3 was significantly affected and up to 48 building sites with a reduced maximum speed of 100 km/h (60 mph) were operating simultaneously on the autobahn. Up to 15,000 people were employed on the construction of the railway line. 7.5 million m^{3} (9.8 million cu yd) of earth was removed during the tunnel construction and approximately 3 million m^{3} (3.9 million cu yd) of concrete were poured. 1,400 miners were hired and 13 people died in accidents during construction of the tunnels.

=== Opening and start-up ===
The symbolic opening of the line took place on 25 July 2002 with a special train carrying approximately 700 honoured guests. On 1 August 2002, the first passenger services commenced, originally with a two-hourly service and later with an hourly service. In December 2002, the full service commenced, integration into the European timetable, although there were many disruptions to services in the first few months due to technical failures.

On 13 June 2004 the Cologne Bonn Airport loop was put into service. At the end of September 2004 the Siegburg/Bonn station was finally completed.

== Route ==
In Cologne ICE trains follow three paths to reach the high-speed line:

- from the north (Düsseldorf or Wuppertal), running via the low level of Cologne Messe/Deutz railway station (tracks 11 and 12)
- from the west (Aachen) through Cologne main station and over the Hohenzollern Bridge or from the north to the main station and then reversing to re-cross the Hohenzollern Bridge
- from the north over the Hohenzollern Bridge to the main station and continuing around the western bypass of central Cologne and over the Cologne south bridge

The first two routes allow trains to run via Cologne–Bonn airport loop line, rejoining the main route at Cologne-Porz-Wahn.

The high-speed line's dedicated track begins in Cologne-Porz and is located between the Sieg Railway and the line from Gremberg yard and the Cologne south bridge, which, in effect, becomes the Right Rhine line when it separates at Troisdorf. Between Porz and Troisdorf there are six parallel lines and the speed limit on the HSL is 200 km/h (125 mph). At Troisdorf the HSL runs through a 627-metre (686 yd) tunnel under connecting lines that allow passenger trains running on the Sieg line to transfer to the Right Rhine line and freight trains on the freight lines to transfer to the Sieg line (and vice versa for northbound trains).

In Troisdorf the Right Rhine line leaves the high-speed line and runs through Bonn-Beuel towards Koblenz. The HSL follows the Siegstrecke to the rebuilt Siegburg/Bonn station and then heads south to run through the Siegauen Tunnel under the Sieg. At that very point it joins the A3, which it parallels south bound towards Frankfurt Airport. Between the Siegauen Tunnel and the Main Bridge (near Frankfurt) the speed limit is 300 km/h (186 mph) and from there to the airport station trains run at 160 to 220 km/h (100 to 140 mph).

In the Wiesbaden suburb of Breckenheim a double line connects to Wiesbaden, partly next to the A66 and then next to the Ländches Railway. Trains run into the Wiesbaden terminal station and can then reverse out to go to Mainz and Mannheim. The 13.2-kilometre-long (8.2 mi) Wiesbaden branch has a maximum speed of about 160 km/h (100 mph).

=== Construction on the approach to Cologne ===
Work is being carried out to create separate tracks for the high-speed line through the heavily used Cologne rail junction from its provisional connection to the conventional line at Köln Steinstraße, where trains are limited to 130 km/h (80 mph) through the points. The line is being extended to Cologne-Mülheim station through Cologne Messe/Deutz railway station (low level). This work was intended to be part of the original high-speed line project, but was dropped to reduce costs. When completed in 2008 this work will reduce the time between Frankfurt and Düsseldorf by 10 minutes.

== See also ==
- High-speed rail in Germany
