= Schöneberg, Altenkirchen =

Schöneberg
- Municipality
- Location of Schöneberg within Altenkirchen district
- Interactive map of Schöneberg
- Location within Germany Location within Rhineland-Palatinate
- Coordinates: 50°39′52″N 7°36′15″E
- Country: Germany
- State: Rhineland-Palatinate
- District: Altenkirchen
- Municipal assoc.: Altenkirchen-Flammersfeld

Government
  - Mayor (2019–24): Frank Iwanowski

Area
  - Total: 3.2 km^{2} (1.2 sq mi)
- Elevation: 219 m (719 ft)

Population (2025-12-31)
  - Total: 432
  - Density: 140/km^{2} (350/sq mi)
- Time zone: UTC+01:00 (CET)
  - Summer (DST): UTC+02:00 (CEST)
- Postal codes: 57638
- Dialling codes: 02681
- Vehicle registration: AK
- Website: schoeneberg-westerwald.de

Schöneberg (German: [ˈʃøːnəbɛʁk]) is a municipality in the district of Altenkirchen, in Rhineland-Palatinate, Germany.

== Transport ==
Schöneberg is located at the Engers–Au railway, which only is in service for fright trains. It also is connected to the local bus lines 127, 136 and 139.
