= Engers–Au railway =

Railway line in Germany

Overview
- Line number: 3032 Engers–Au; 3034 Grenzau–Hillscheid
- Locale: Rhineland-Palatinate, North Rhine-Westphalia, Germany

Service
- Route number: formerly 421, 423

Technical
- Track gauge: 1,435 mm (4 ft 8 1/2 in) standard gauge

The Engers–Au railway is a single-track, non-electrified railway line and consists of three sections, which are treated separately here. It is the mainly in the German state of Rhineland-Palatinate, although the section near Au is in North Rhine-Westphalia.

== Names ==
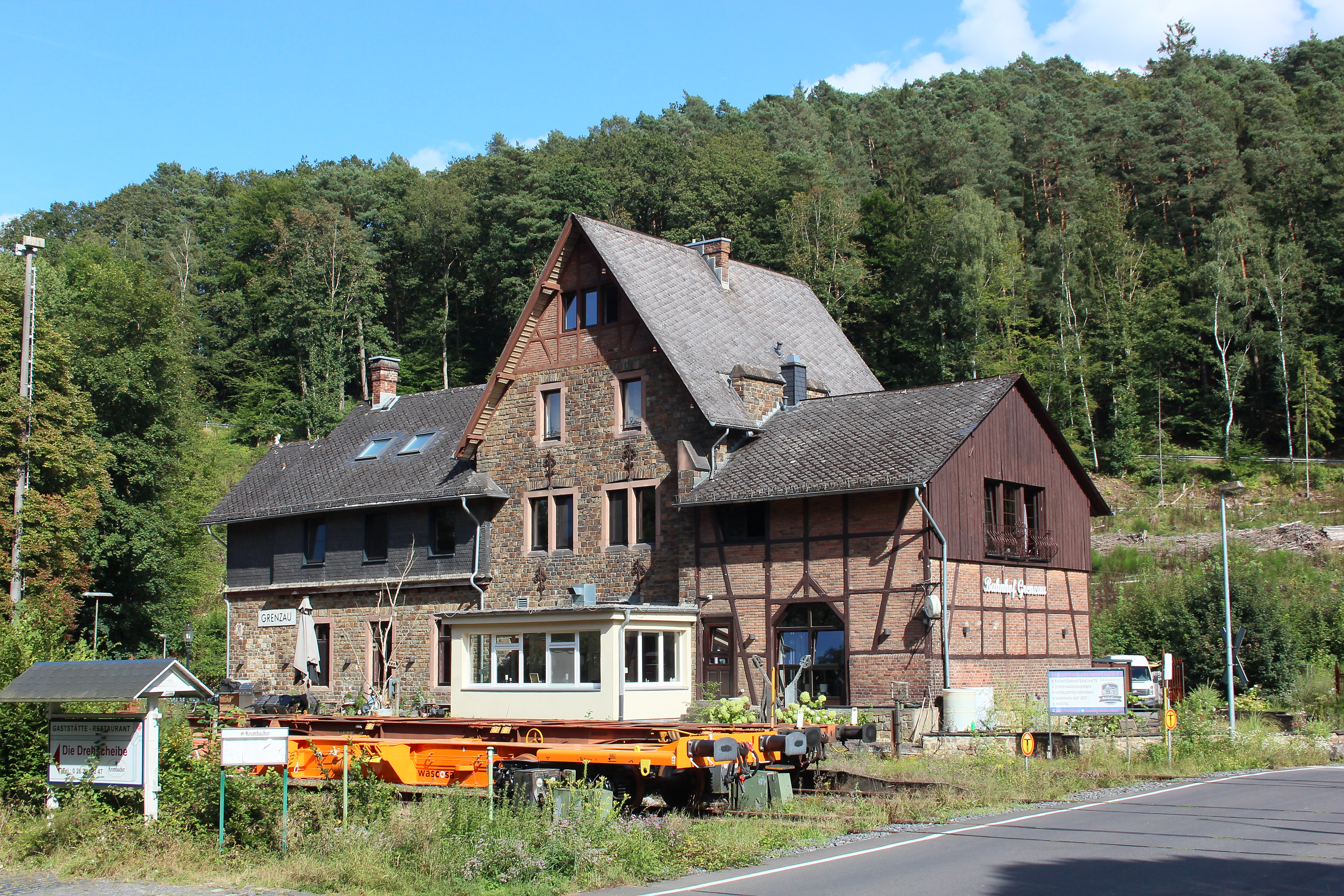
Former train station in Grenzau

There are several different names for the line or parts of it; these are:

- Brexbachtalbahn (Brexbach Valley Railway) for the Engers–Siershahn section
- Holzbachtalbahn (Holzbach Valley Railway) for the Siershahn–Altenkirchen section
- Westerwald-Sieg-Bahn (Westerwald-Sieg Railway), until 2014: Oberwesterwaldbahn (Upper-Westerwald Rwilway) for the Altenkirchen–Au section and the Limburg–Altenkirchen line, which runs as line number RB90 of the brand Dreiländerbahn of the HLB.

== History ==
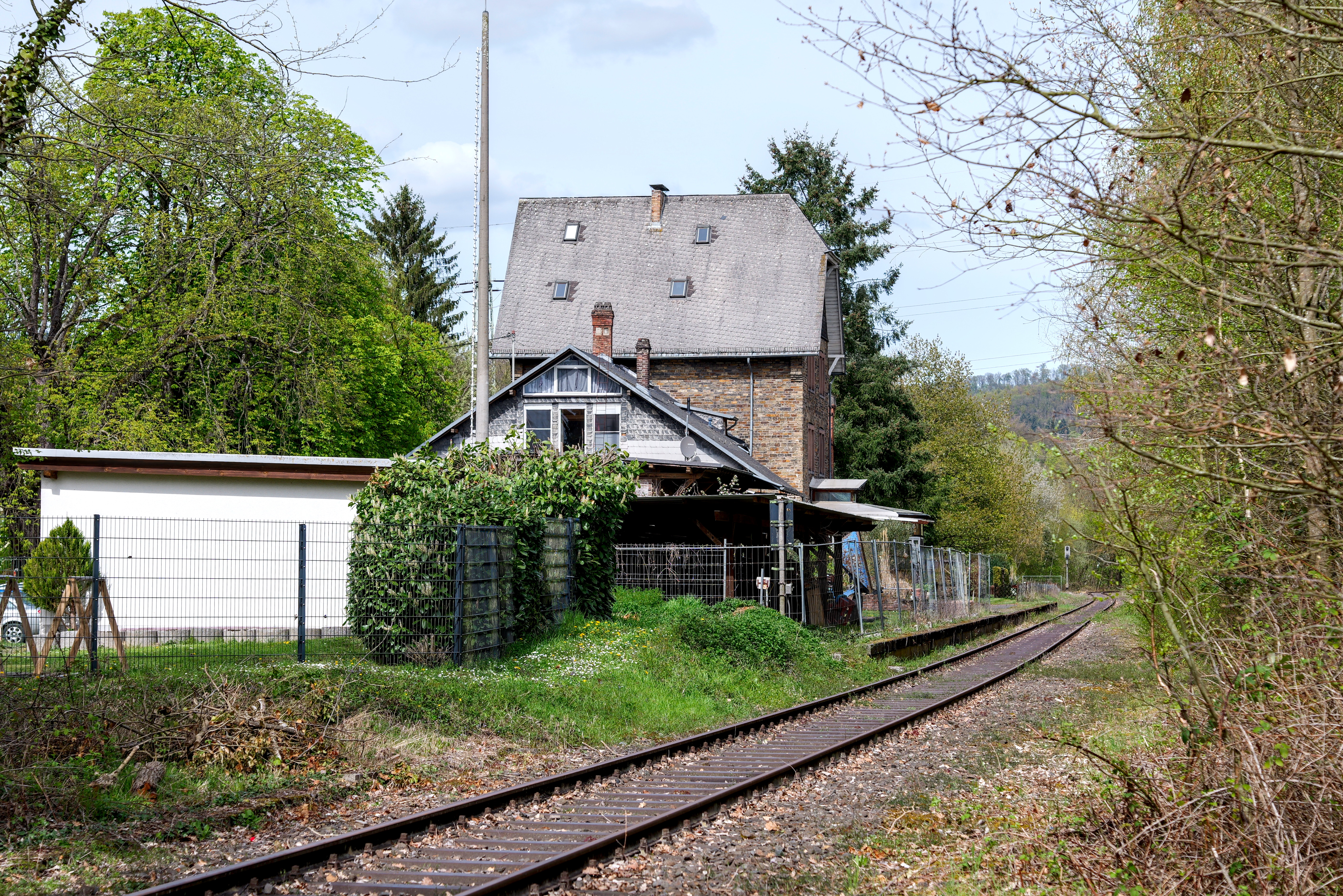
Bendorf-Sayn train stop

The first efforts to build a railway in this region began in the early 1870s with the Hessian Ludwig Railway (Hessische Ludwigsbahn, HLB) planning a line across the Westerwald. The Rhenish Railway Company (Rheinische Eisenbahn-Gesellschaft, RhE) also planned a line from the Sieg Valley to Limburg with a branch to the Rhine. The RhE was granted a concession for the Engers–Altenkirchen and Limburg–Siershahn lines in 1871. The HLB received a concession for a line from Troisdorf via Altenkirchen to Limburg in 1873.

The RhE contract stipulated completion four years after the necessary land acquisition. The RhE used this provision as a pretext to delay construction, as funds were scarce after the Gründerkrach ("Founders' Crash", the economic crisis following the founding of the German Empire, part of the Panic of 1873), even though 16 million marks had been budgeted for the project. Land acquisition and detailed planning of the railway lines dragged on for several years. When the company was finally nationalised by Prussia in 1880, the new completion date was set for 1 July 1884. The actual construction work then began simultaneously at numerous points along the line, as the RhE had already secured the necessary funds before nationalisation. The line was opened on schedule on 30 May 1884, along with the Staffel–Siershahn and Grenzau–Höhr-Grenzhausen lines.

The HLB faced similar problems and allowed its concession to lapse in 1880. Since the line of the nationalised RhE and the Limburg–Altenkirchen railway, which the Prussian state was to complete, would now have ended without a connection to the Sieg valley in the Westerwald region, Prussia decided on 21 May 1883, to build the Altenkirchen–Au connection at its own expense. This section was opened on 1 May 1887.

=== Operation until 1990s ===
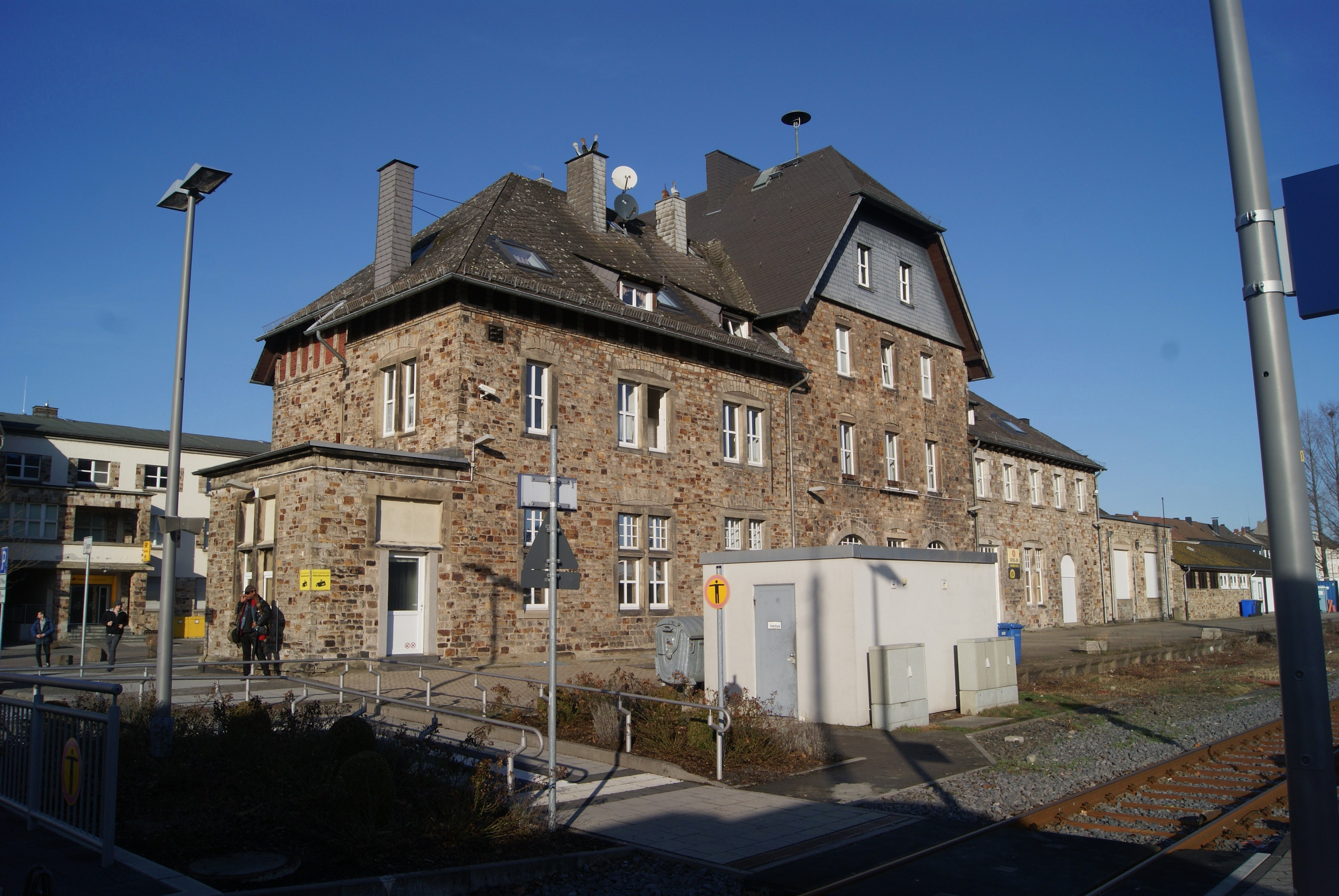
Altenkirchen station building

The Engers–Siershahn section was planned to be double-tracked in 1905, but the project was not implemented due to high construction costs.

At the end of the Second World War, the line was repeatedly targeted by bombing raids, resulting in significant damage to the stations at Altenkirchen, Dierdorf, and Siershahn. Retreating troops then blew up numerous bridges in March 1945, bringing traffic to a standstill for the time being. The line was not fully operational again until 1947.

After passenger services were switched to Uerdingen railbuses, the request stops of Hundsdorf, Mogendorf, Nordhofen, Brückrachdorf, Wienau, Berzhausen, Schöneberg (Westerwald), Kloster Marienthal and Ebernhahn were added on 20 October 1952, and the later opening of the Hohe Grete halt(now: Pracht Hohegrete) was announced.

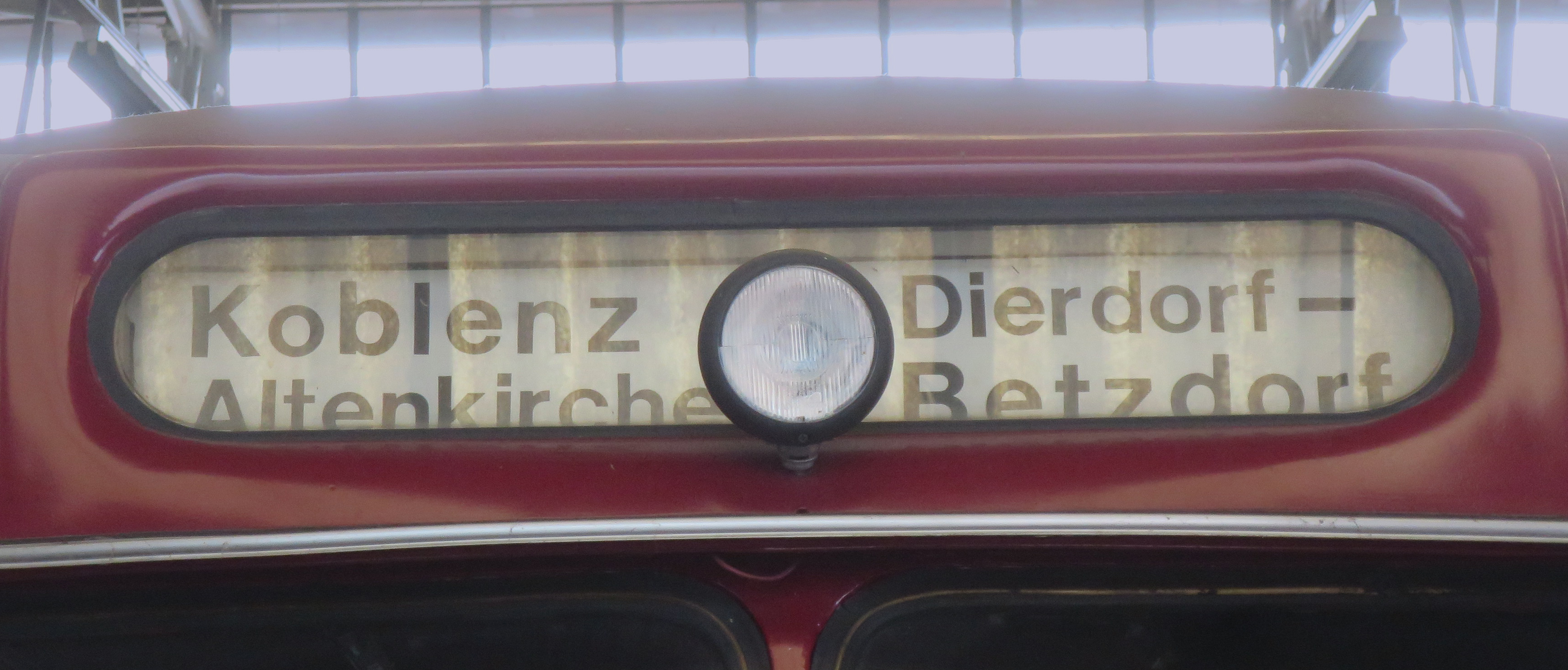
Destination sign of a rail-road bus

From 1954 to 1967, the Koblenz–Betzdorf rail-road bus service also ran along this route, operating on tracks from Dierdorf (near Koblenz). Marienrachdorf station was downgraded to an unmanned stop on 7 July 1967. Steam locomotives ran regularly on the line until 1975. The last trains to operate were ballast trains from Erbach towards Troisdorf/Cologne, hauled by Betzdorf-based Class 50 locomotives.

On 2 June 1984, passenger services on the Siershahn–Altenkirchen section were discontinued. In 1986, Deutsche Bundesbahn (German Federal Railway) and the state of Rhineland-Palatinate concluded a framework agreement stipulating that both partners would develop plans to improve services and that a ten-year guarantee would be given for local rail services on the Au–Westerburg–Limburg line. As a result, train services between Au and Altenkirchen were expanded in 1988. Operations were largely converted to the new Class 628 trains, travel times were reduced by introducing request stops, and the number of services was increased. On 28 May 1989, local rail passenger services on the Engers–Siershahn section were also discontinued. Despite the agreement and the increase in train frequency by nine journeys per day, cross-sectional demand continued to decline, specifically on the Altenkirchen–Au section from 955 passengers per day in 1988 to 697 per day in 1992. Consequently, the service was made more frequent with the timetable change in 1993, and services were expanded during off-peak hours. At the same time, this section was converted to signaled train control operation.

Freight traffic between Engers and Ludwig siding ceased on 1 August 1994. A small section was still used around 2001 during the construction of the Cologne–Frankfurt high-speed rail line, and in 2004 the section between Ludwig siding and Siershahn was also closed. For years, the line was heavily overgrown in places and impassable.

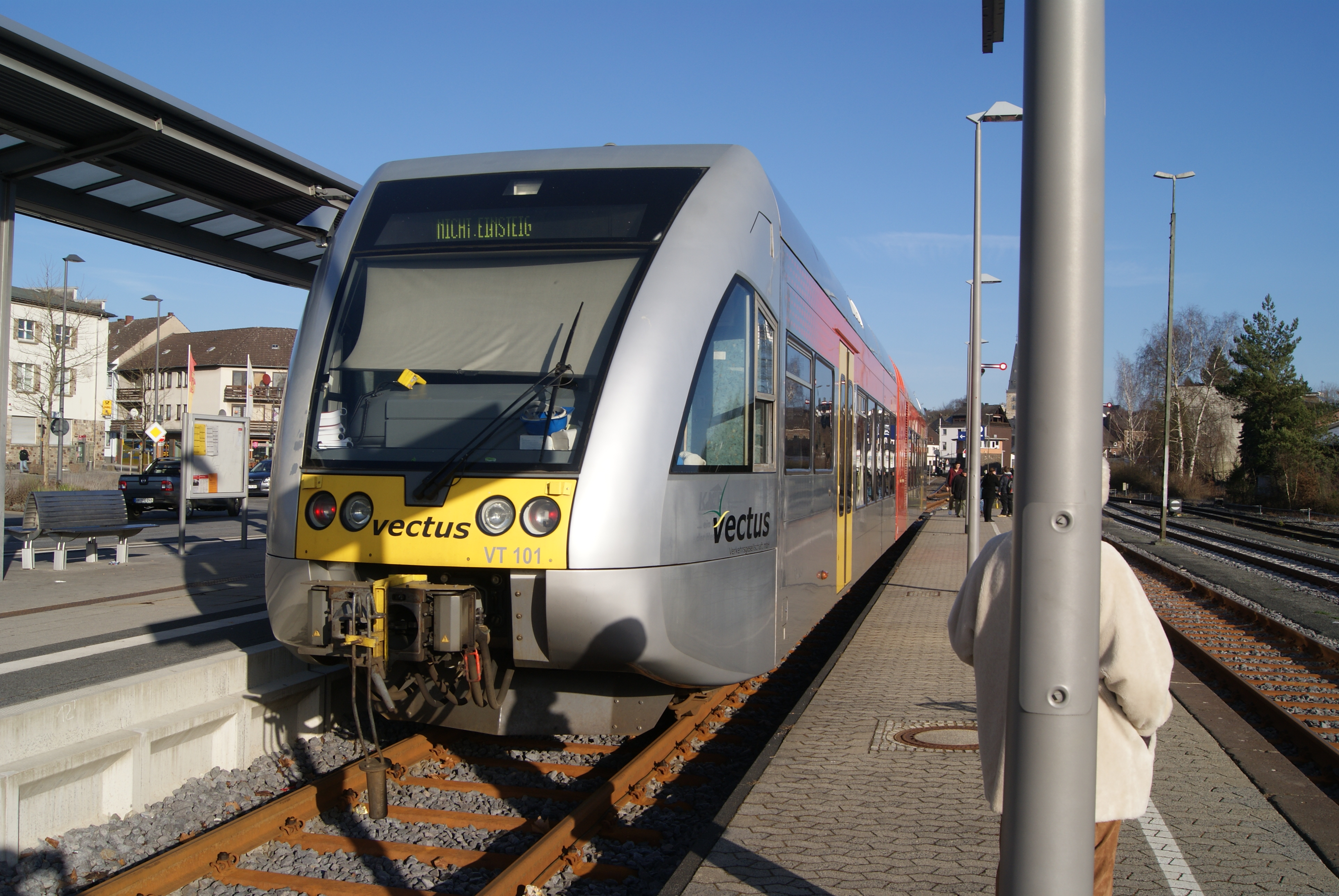
Vectus railcar in operation on the Oberwesterwaldbahn railway during a stop at Altenkirchen station

With the commencement of operations on 12 December 2004, Vectus Verkehrsgesellschaft deployed its new LINT multiple units, which were able to reinstate the request stops established in 1986 as regular stops. At the timetable change on 14 December 2014, Hessische Landesbahn (HLB) took over operations on the Oberwesterwaldbahn for a period of 16 years, serviced by the section DreiLänderBahn of HLB as well as the rolling stock and personnel from Vectus. The current train services, operating under the name Westerwald-Sieg-Bahn (RB 90), generally run through from Siegen, with the addition of some supplementary services on the Altenkirchen–Au section. Since the upgrade does not yet allow for the Siegen–Altenkirchen–Limburg journey times with all planned stops according to the Deutschlandtakt (Germany-wide integrated timetable), most services initially terminated in Westerburg. Services between Betzdorf, Au, and Altenkirchen are doubled every two hours.

In early 2023, it was announced that three two-car Siemens Mireo Plus B multiple units would be deployed in pilot operation when the timetable changed in December 2025. These units resulted from a tender issued by the Hessische Landesbahn and are part of a test by SPNV-Nord ("Rhineland-Palatinate North Public Transport Association") for the decarbonisation of rail transport.

In November 2023, a new computer-based interlocking of signal box design class ZSB 2000 went into operation at Breitscheidt station, thus ending the use of signalled train control.

=== Freight traffic on the Holzbachtal railway since 2005 ===
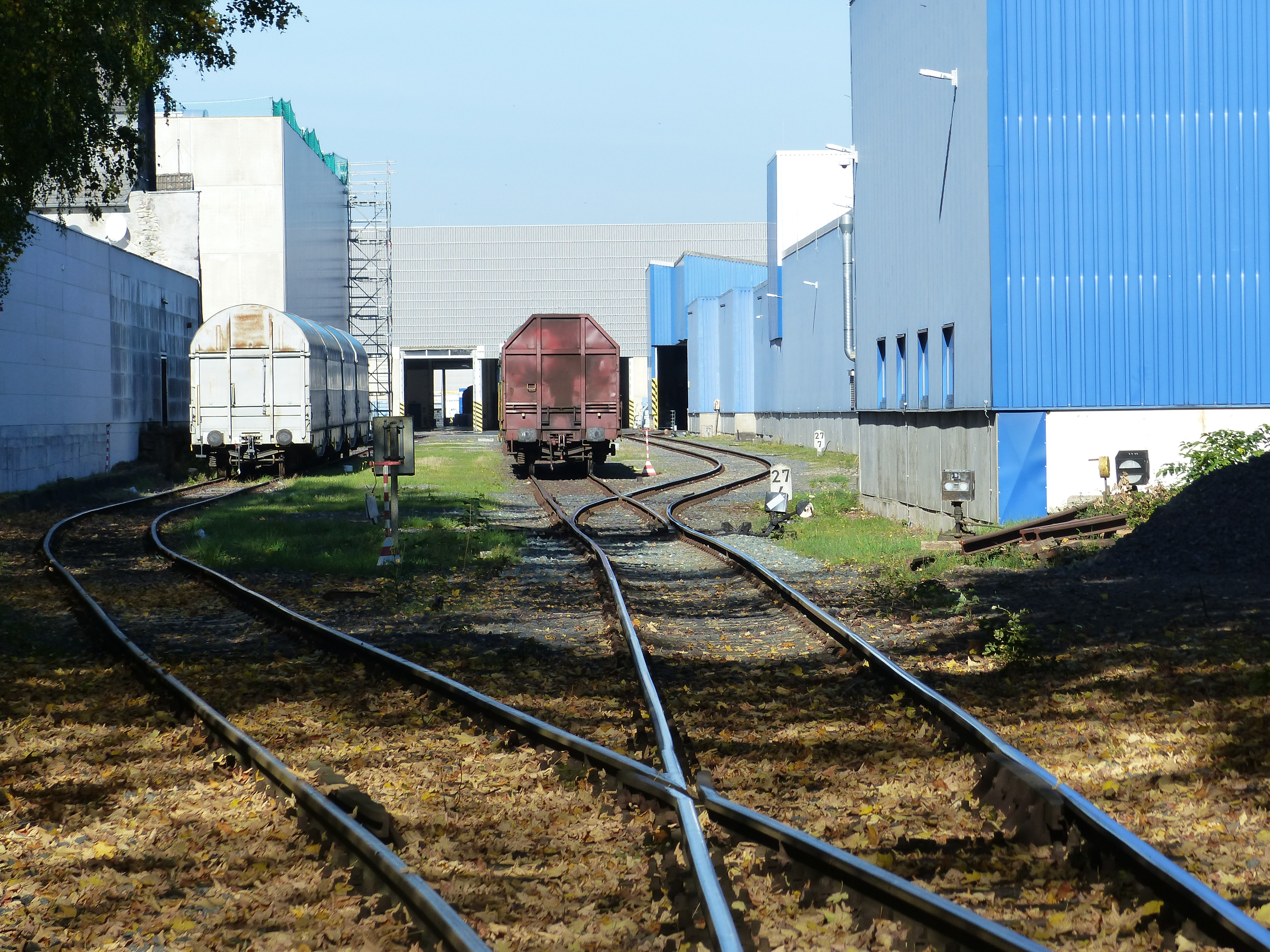
Passage through the company premises of Schütz

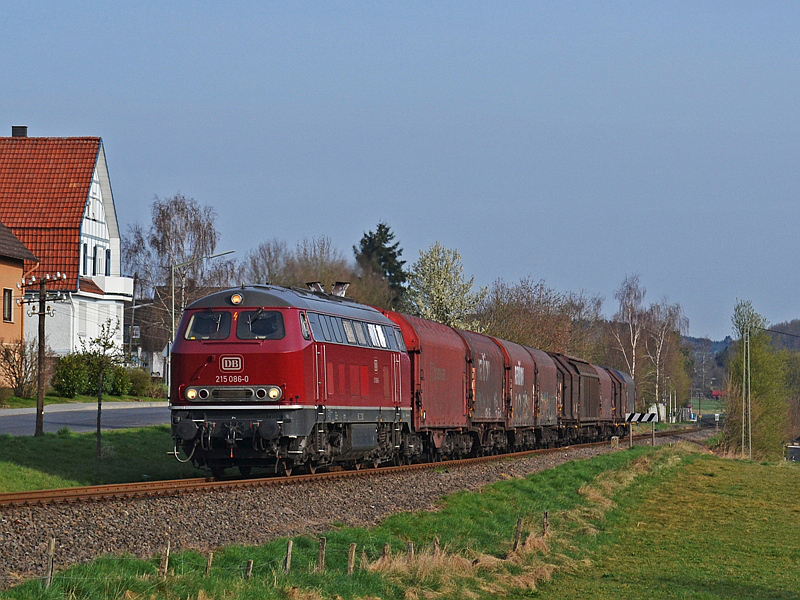
The freight train to Selters for Schütz Behälterbau, which runs as scheduled from Monday to Friday, is hauled by a Class 215 diesel locomotive near Obererbach.

In 2005, the infrastructure of the Selters–Raubach line, which had been closed in 1999, became the property of Westerwaldbahn (WEBA). It was reactivated in 2006. Together with the Raubach–Altenkirchen section, WEBA has since served freight customers by rail from Altenkirchen, including a siding in Neitersen and Schütz Behälterbau in Selters, where the line also passes factory buildings on the factory premises. OnRail DH 1004 diesel locomotives (converted Class V 100 locomotives of Deutsche Bundesbahn) were used. Through freight traffic only occurred when the line via Montabaur was closed. In 2017, the transport volume reached its peak of 230,000 tonnes, which enabled operation that covered costs.

In June 2017, the Altenkirchen district council decided to terminate the cooperation agreement with DB Cargo and to initiate decommissioning proceedings for the Holzbachtalbahn line by the district-owned Westerwaldbahn railway company, effective 31 December 2017. A competitor of Schütz, Werit-Kunststoffwerke W. Schneider GmbH & Co. KG in Altenkirchen, had filed a lawsuit against the modernisation of the line, which was necessary due to its comparatively poor condition, arguing that the rail connection and the renovation of the line at the expense of public funds would give Schütz an unfair competitive advantage. Freight traffic was then partially taken over by DB Cargo at the beginning of December 2017 and completely by August 2018. DB Cargo handles all traffic via Montabaur, except for one empty train per week. At the end of 2017, Westerwaldbahn terminated the rail connection agreements.

In June 2018, it was announced that the shareholders' meeting of the Westerwald Railway had approved a takeover agreement with the Lappwald Railway. Since no further train paths are available on the Limburg-Staffel–Siershahn line, the Holzbachtal Railway remains important for freight traffic. To counter the competition complaint, tourist services are among the options being considered.

On 26 November 2018, Lappwaldbahn Service GmbH purchased the line, becoming its owner on 1 January 2019. Following temporary repairs, freight traffic on the line was able to resume on a trial basis at the end of 2019. Since September 2020, a complete overhaul has been underway, during which freight traffic was suspended for six months to allow for the reconstruction of five bridges. As part of this line renovation, in 2022, in addition to various rails, the existing steel sleepers, some dating back to 1927, were replaced with concrete sleepers on sections of the line after almost 100 years of service. The work, which required a double-digit million euro investment, was scheduled for completion in 2023/24.

In 2025, Holzbachtalbahn GmbH took over the Selters to Altenkirchen section of the line from Lappwaldbahn as owner, although the latter continued operations until 14 December 2025.

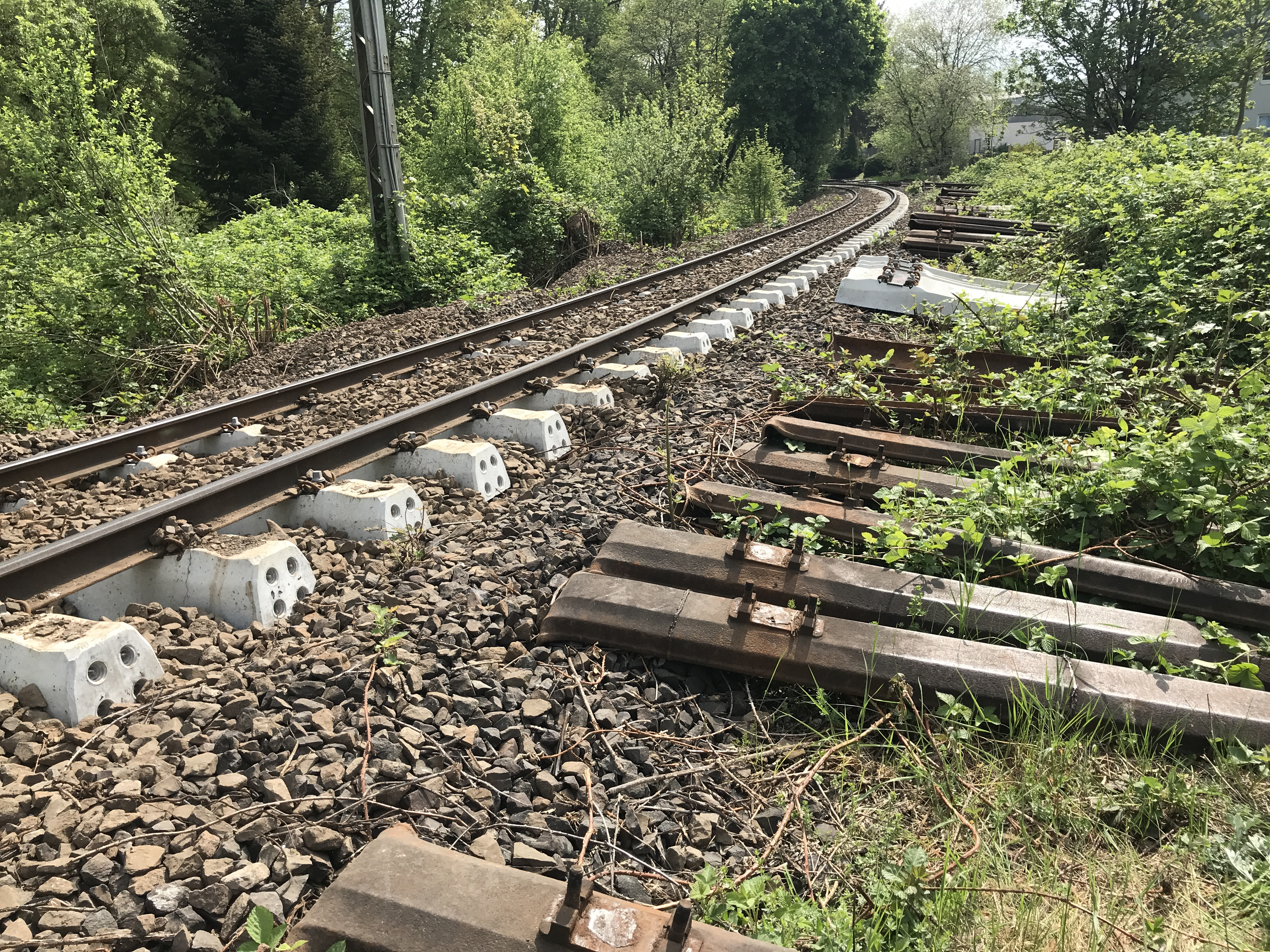
Renovation of the route in 2022

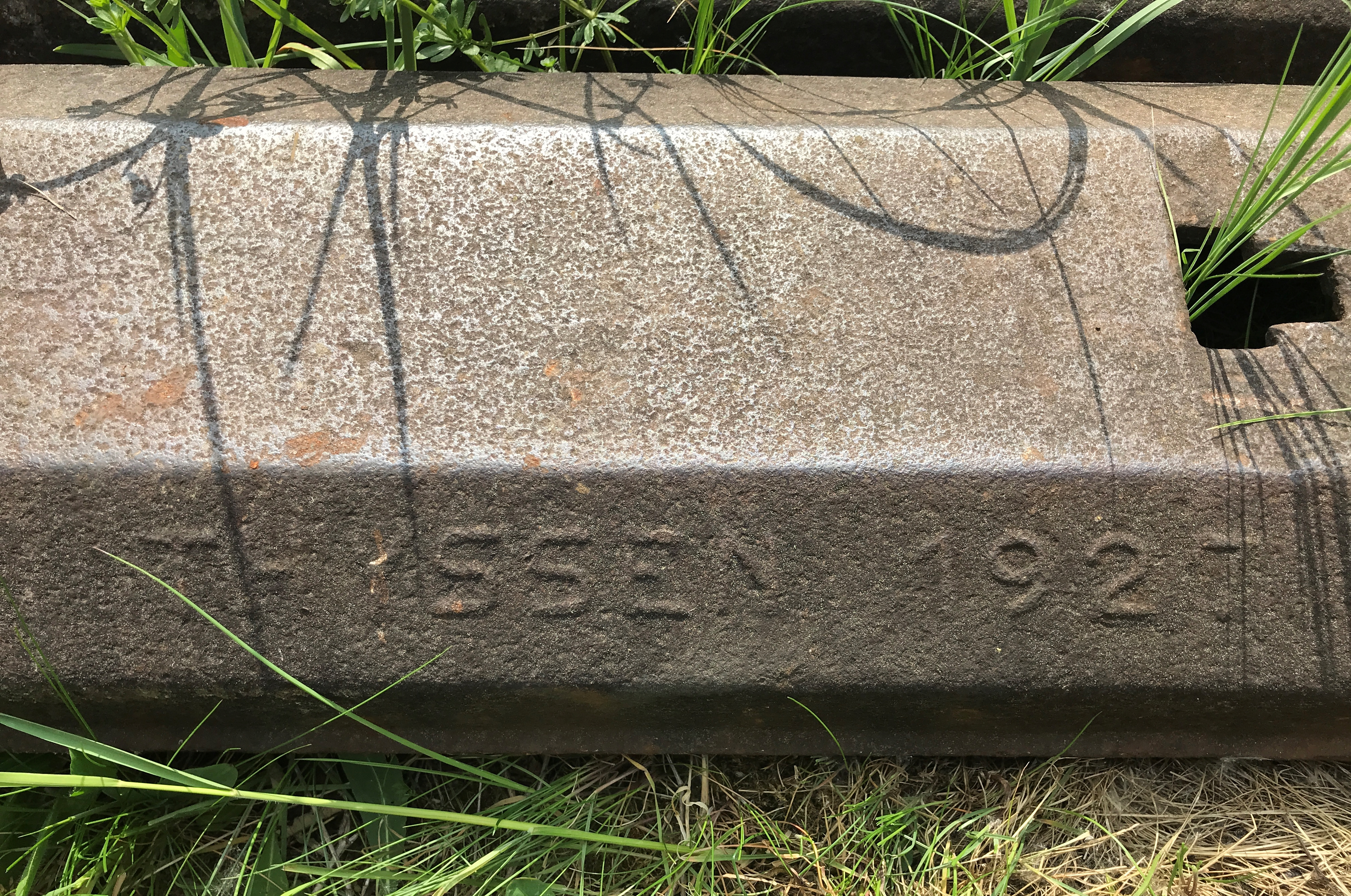
Steel sleeper from 1927

Freight traffic still operates from Altenkirchen today. Reactivating the passenger service has been under discussion for several years; in 2004, test runs were conducted between Altenkirchen and Raubach using a railcar operated by Vectus Verkehrsgesellschaft.

=== Plans ===
In November 2020, the state of Rhineland-Palatinate and Deutsche Bahn signed a framework agreement for the construction of new stations and the relocation of existing ones. As part of the station modernisation initiative, a new station is planned to open in Pracht-Wickhausen in 2027, replacing the existing Hohegrete station.

== Brexbachtalbahn e. V. ==
On 26 March 2007, the Brexbachtalbahn Association was founded in Bendorf. Its goal is to put the railway back into operation for tourism and later on for public transport.

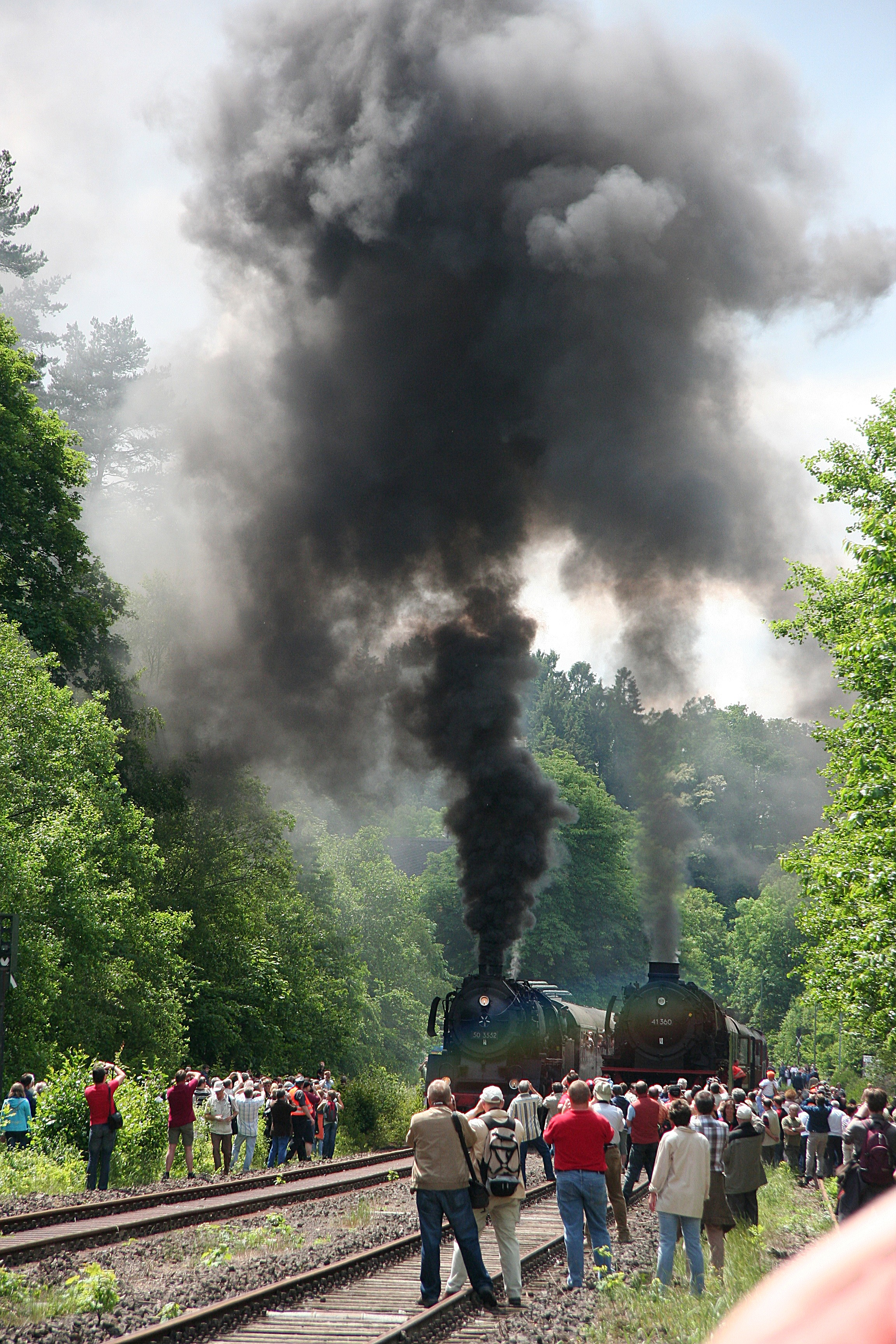
Steam locomotives at the railway festival on 31 May 2009, to celebrate the reopening of the Grenzau–Siershahn section of the railway line

== Touristic transport ==
On 13 February 2009, the Rhineland-Palatinate Ministry of Transport granted operating approval for the Siershahn–Grenzau section. As part of a celebration marking the 125th anniversary of the Brexbach Valley Railway on May 30, 2009, and during the following Pentecost weekend, the section was reopened with shuttle services operated by a steam train for tourist traffic, following the ribbon-cutting ceremony by Transport Minister Hendrik Hering. In addition to the shuttle services, a special steam train arrived from Oberhausen. The Brexbach Valley Railway Association established additional request stops in Bendorf/Sayn (Kaufland supermarket) and at the Sayn Climbing Forest/Sayn Abbey, and also reactivated the Scout Camp stop.

In 2010, tourist train journeys were offered for the first time on the Siershahn–Grenzau section using Class 798 railbuses, steam trains, and LINT multiple units operated by Vectus Verkehrsgesellschaft. Additional journeys were offered for special regional events on the line. The operating license expired in December 2013, and no further journeys took place. On 28 March 2017, the Bendorf City Council voted against reactivating the line.

In March 2019, the Grenzau–Siershahn section was granted a new operating license for 25 years. The Engers–Grenzau section is regularly used as a construction track by construction trains of the Brexbachtalbahn e. V. association. The line is operated by Eifelbahn Verkehrsgesellschaft mbH (EVG). In June, the Engers–Sayn section was also granted a license.

== Reactivation for public transport ==
=== Engers - Siershahn section ===
In 2024, SPNV-Nord commissioned a cost-benefit analysis for the reactivation of the section from Engers to Siershahn, (called Brexbach Valley Railway). In 2025, SPNV Nord published the results of its feasibility study, which examined the potential operation of a regional train line between Engers and Siershahn. The study arrived at a cost-benefit ratio of 3.89, thus deeming the reactivation of the line for regular local passenger service to be economically viable.

In Bendorf, a road was built across the line, rendering it unusable. The operator of the line, Eifelbahn Verkehrsgesellschaft, is therefore suing the state of Rhineland-Palatinate to have the road removed. The oral hearing took place before the Koblenz Administrative Court on 2 June 2026. There is also opposition in Bendorf to reopening the line and reinstating the level crossing. Although a research study came to the result, that the time, the level crossings at Brauereistr. in Bendorf will be closed will be only 39 seconds per train in direction of Grenzau and 50 seconds per train in direction of Siershahn. Also, due to a leck of crossing possobilities in train stations, only one train pair, means one passenger train for any direction per hour, will be possible.

The lawsuit against the state of Rhineland-Palatinate was dismissed in July 2026. A parallel lawsuit against the town of Berndorf was withdrawn by Eifelbahn GmbH itself, as the town of Berndorf has now shown a willingness to find a solution to make the line operational again. The main obstacle is the road to the brewery, which has been paved over at the level crossing.

Time is also of the essence, as work to connect the Brexbachtalbahn with the right-hand branch line at Engers station was scheduled to begin in June 2026 and be completed in December. This would allow local passenger service from Neuwied via Berndorf, Grenzau, Ransbach-Baumbach, and Siershahn to Montabaur.

In July 2026, the local newspaper of Bendorf, "Kleeblatt", has announced an article titled "City of Bendorf successful in legal dispute over the Brexbach Valley Railway" in the argument of the closure of the railroads crossing at Brauereistraße through constructing a tamark road on the tracks.

Criticism came from the Brexbach Valley Railway interest group "Die Brex e. V / Brexbachtalbahn e. V." because the article were not an independent reporting, but rather the press release from the city administration.

The report states that the city has "successfully prevailed" in the legal dispute concerning the crossing of Brauereistraße (Brewery Street) with the railway line. The administrative court upheld the city's legal position that closing the road is "not permissible under road law." Also a lawsuit against the state of Rhineland-Palatinate was already dismissed in June 2026 and that the city remains open to discussions about the future of the Brexbach Valley Railway.

The Brexbach Valley Railway interest group expressly welcomes the willingness of the city of Bendorf to engage in an open dialogue, which is seen to be there since the lawsuit against the city of Bendorf has been started, it is the true outcome of the two court proceedings.

Bexbach Valley Railway interest group sees a chance to find a solution for the internet conflict between Eifelbahn Verkehrsgesellschaft, Zweckverband SPNV Nord and Brexbach Valley Railway interest group on the one side and the city of Bendorf on the other side through the new willingness to engage in an open dialogue.

In November 2026, it was announced that, following the completion of the renovation work on the East Rhine Railway, no turnout will initially be installed at Engers station to connect the Engers–Au railway line to the Right Rhine line. However, provisions will be made within the new electronic signalbox German: elektronisches Stellwerk, short: (ESTW), to allow for a future connection between the two lines at Engers station. A complication has arisen because a noise barrier was constructed on the site of the former turnout; consequently, a new turnout will now need to be installed somewhat further to the north. In addition, the overhead contact lines and signal cables will require adjustments.

=== Siershahn - Altenkirchen section ===
In 2005 test rides with a Lint train of the Vectus Verkehrsgesellschaft took place on the Holzbachtalbahn.

In 2006, a special train ride with historic railcars or the type VT 98, rented by the interest group IG Westerwald Querbahn e. V. from the association Oberhessische Eisenbahnfreunde (OEF) took place from Limburg to Altenkirchen (via Limburg-Altenkirchen railway) and back to Limburg via Holzbachtalbahn and Staffel-Sierhahn railway.

Since 2020, also the state of Rhineland-Palatinate supports the renovation of the infrastructure of the Siershahn-Altenkirchen section of Engers–Au railway (Holzbachtalbahn.

In 2023, the broken automatically working level crossing Hedwigsthal near Raubach has been repaired which is an advantage for the well working fright train traffic.

In 2024, Martin Henke from the association Verband Deutscher Verkehrsunternehmen (VDV) announced together with the association Allianz pro Schiene that the Holzbachtalbahn can be a candidate for reactivation for the public local transport (SPNV).

From 2025, the new founded railway company Holzbachtalbahn GmbH overtook the freight transport on this line from the Lappwaldbahn GmbH and uses the section from Altenkirchen to Siershahn for fright traffic, additionally, Schütz company uses the Siershahn - Selters section for fright transport, but there is no current plan for a reactivation for the passenger transport.

== Route description ==
The section along the Brexbach, also known as the Brexbach Valley Railway, connects the right bank Rhine line with the Lower Westerwald Railway and runs from Neuwied - Engers via Bendorf, Grenzau, and Ransbach-Baumbach to Siershahn. Between Engers and Siershahn, a difference in altitude of 230 meters must be overcome. The railway line runs through the Brexbach Valley on over 36 bridges and viaducts and through seven tunnels. From Grenzau station, the Grenzau–Hillscheid railway line branched off, running via Höhr-Grenzhausen station to Hillscheid. From 1912 to 1945, the line from Linz (Rhein) joined the Brexbach Valley Railway between Flammersfeld and Seifen stations.

=== Stations ===
Engers

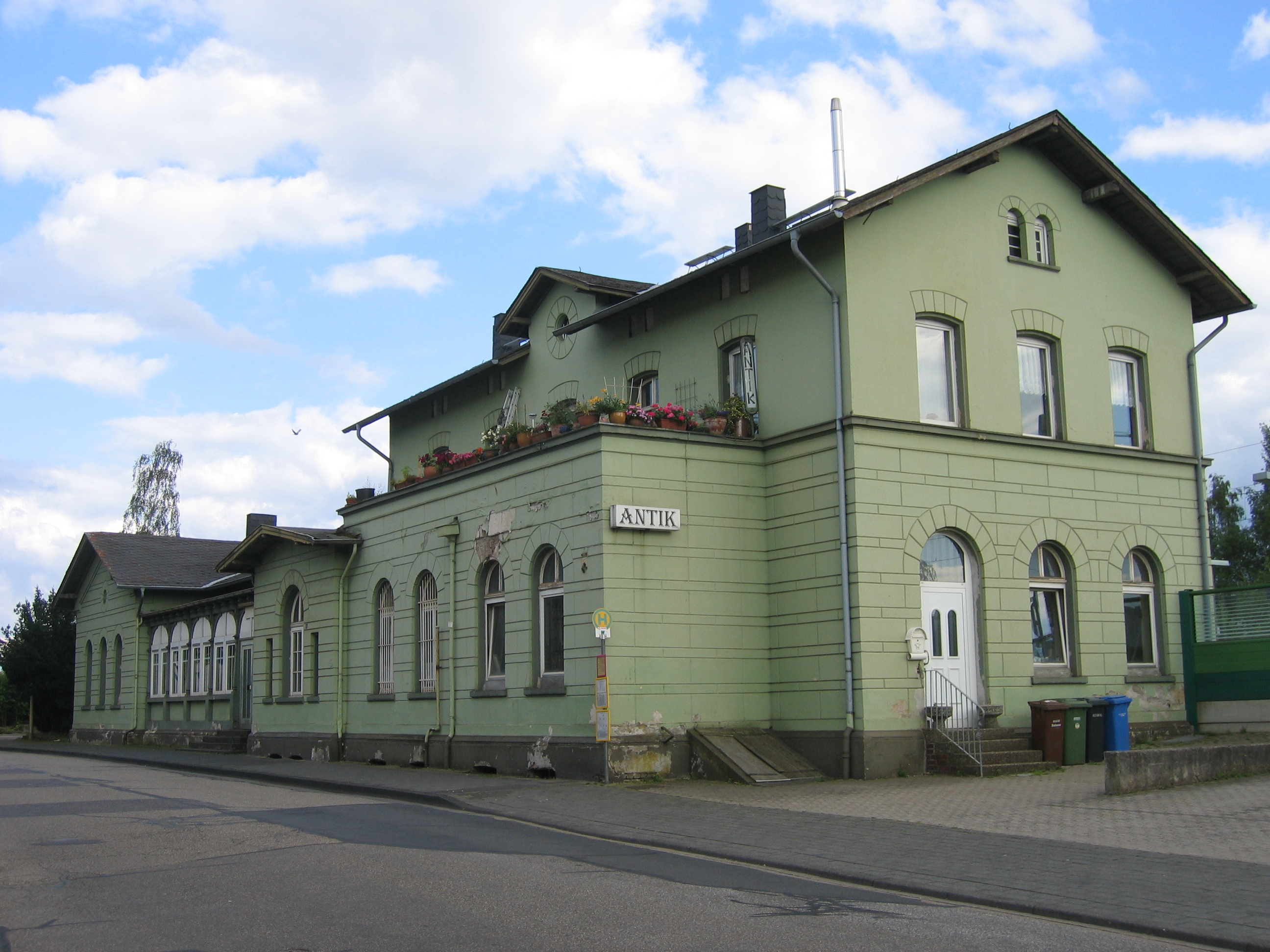
Engers station building

Engers railway station has existed since the opening of the Right Rhine Railway in 1869. Later, a railway junction with its own locomotive depot and marshalling yard was developed here.

Bendorf-Sayn Kaufland

The Bendorf-Sayn Kaufland stop is a planned stop at the Engers–Au railway which will be located in the district Sayn of the city of Bendorf in a business and residential area next to the Kaufland supermarket. This planned stop became well known due to its planned location next to the Brauereistr level crossing, which has caused arguments between the city of Bendorf and the Eifelbahn-Verkehrsgesellschaft, Zweckverband SPNV Nord and Brexbachtalbahn e. V.

Bendorf/Sayn

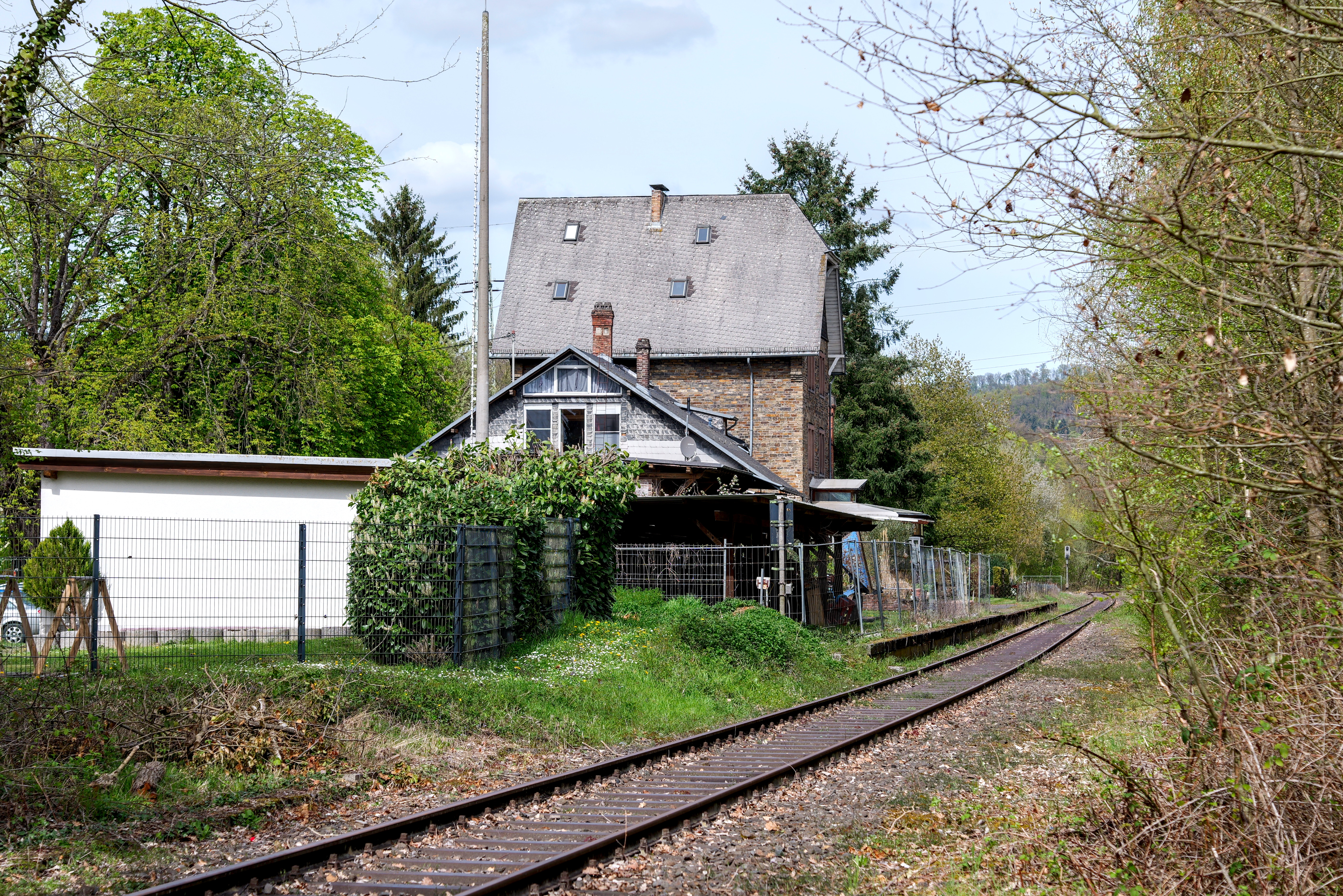
Bendorf/Sayn

This stop was one of two in Bendorf (beside Pfadfinderlager stop) while Brexbach Valley Railway was still in service for public transport

Bendorf-Sayn Abtei

This will be another stop in Bendorf which is still planned, with amenities and attractioms such as the Bendorf Abbey.

Pfadfinderlager

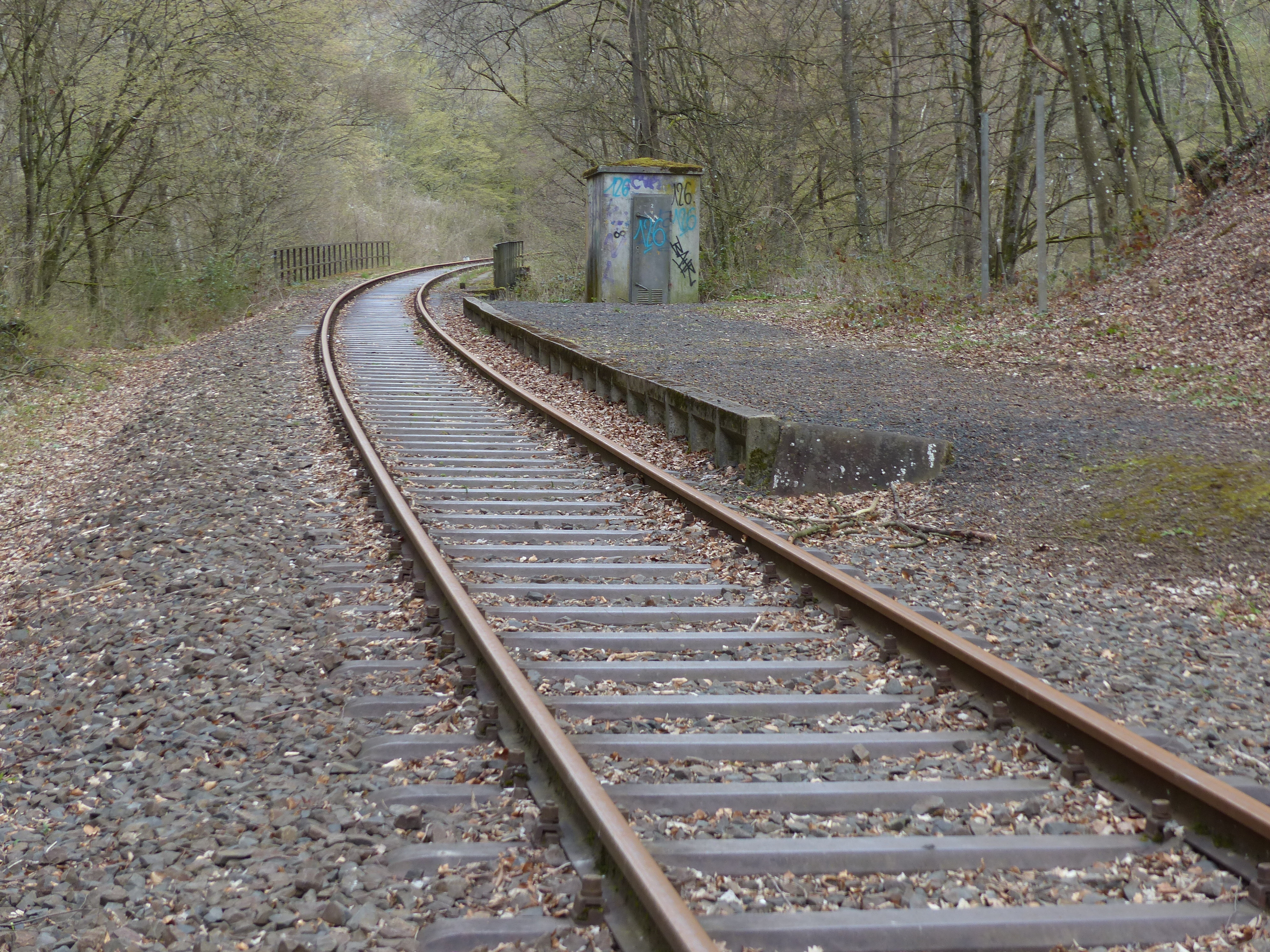
Bendorf Pfadfinderlager stop

A simple stop whose name came from the scout camp of Bendorf/Sayn.

Grenzau

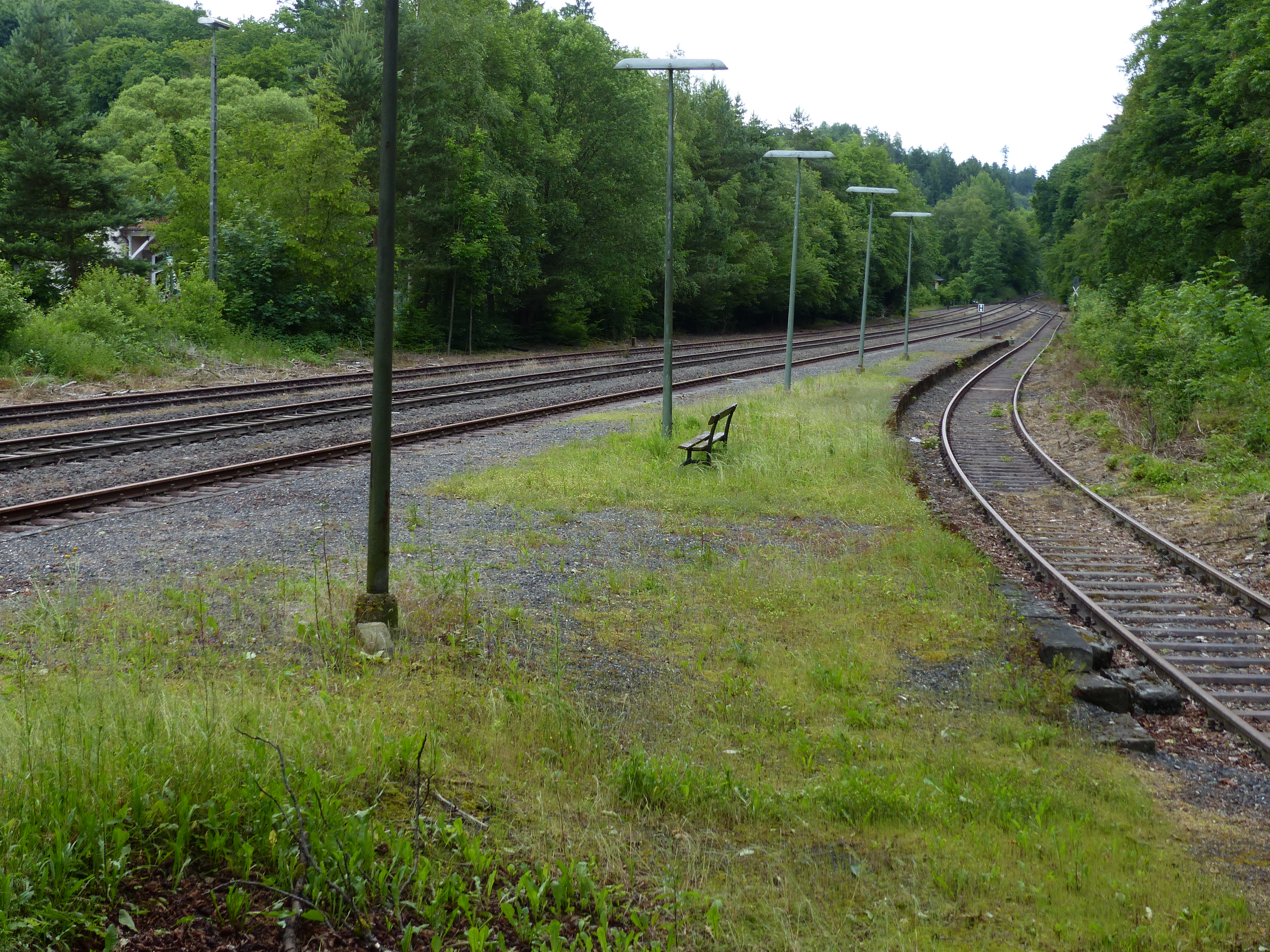
Platform at Grenzau station, track of branch line to Hillscheid on the right

Besides the branch line to the Grenzau–Hillscheid railway, Grenzhausen station was primarily important as a water station during the steam locomotive era; all trains traveling uphill had to take on water here.

Brexbachtal

This stop has already existed when the Brexbachtal railway was in service.

Höhr-Grenzhausen

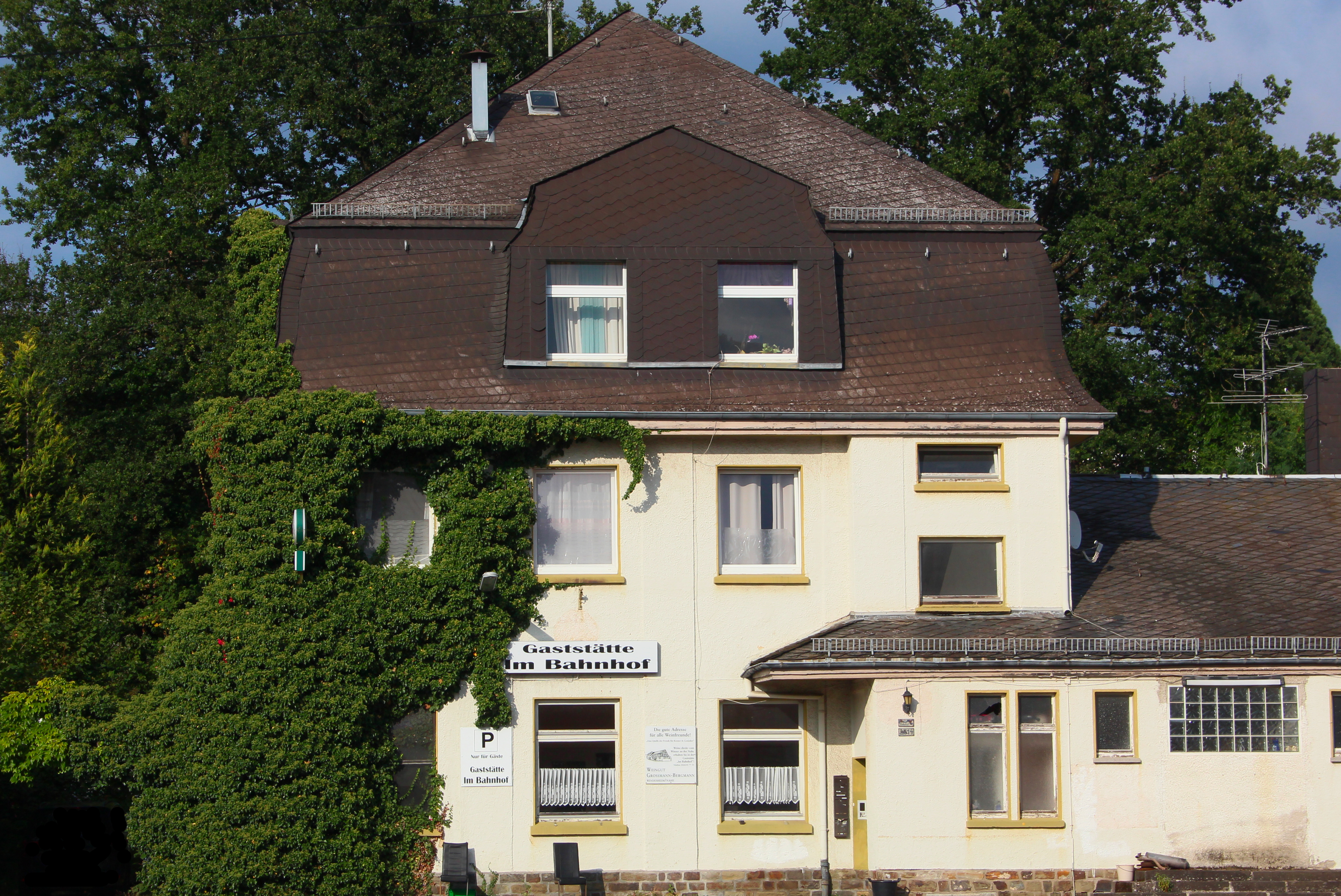
Höhr-Grenzhausen station at the branch line to Hillscheid

Once an important station to connect Höhr-Grenzhausen, which is an intermediate center due to the state planing of Rhineland-Palatinate to the public local train network.

Hillscheid

End of the branch line from Grenzau via Höhr-Grenzhausen to Hillscheid, nowadays the tracks to the station have been deconstructed.

Hundsdorf

A simple, already existing stop located in the village Hundsdorf.

Ransbach (Westerwald)

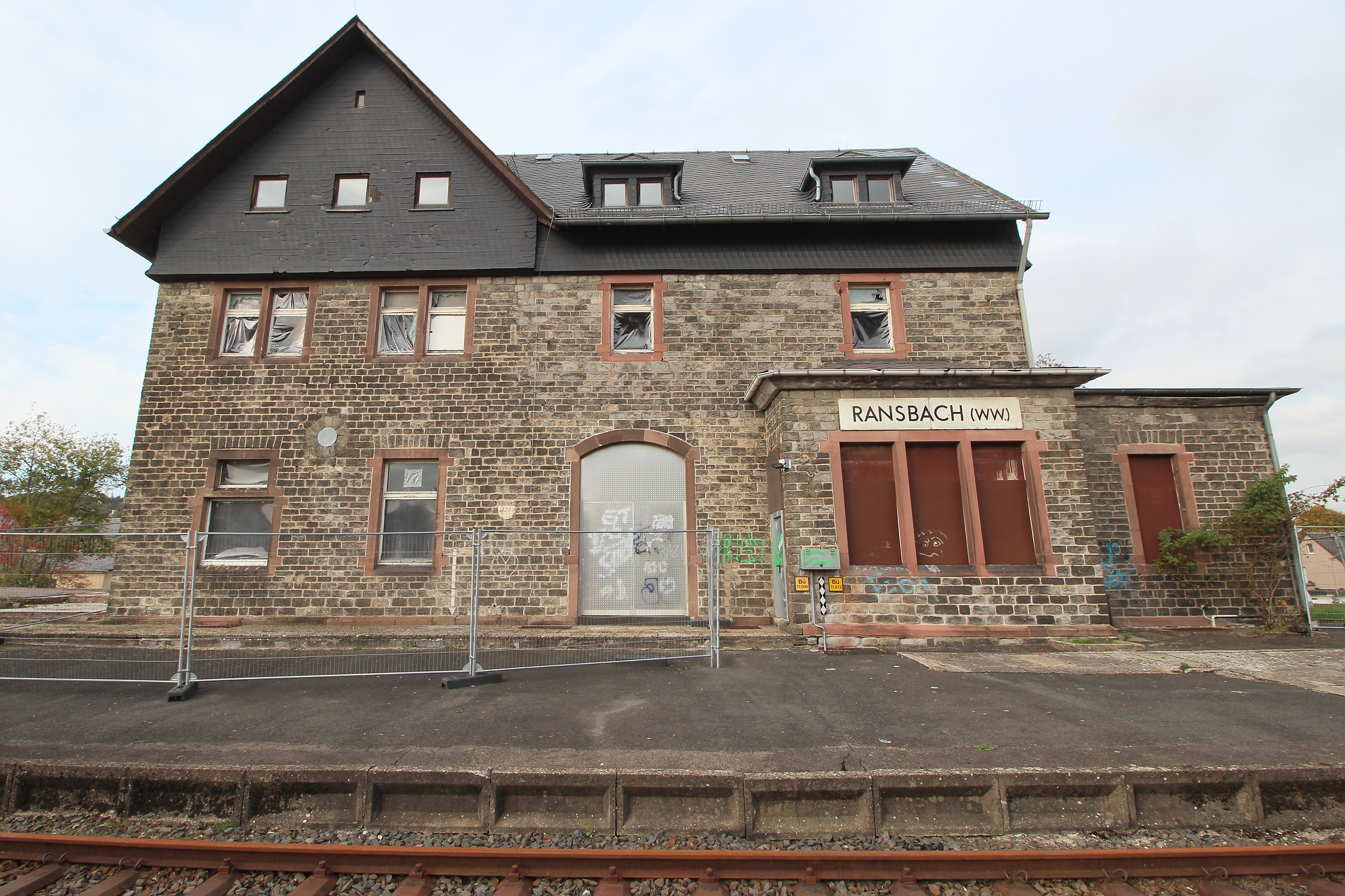
Ransbach station

The station located in the part Ransbach of the nowadays formed town Ransbach-Baumbach has two platforms, the tracks have been cleared from the NGO Brexbachtalbahn e. V. since 2009, the historic station building nowadays is under private ownership.

Ebernhahn

A simple stop with one platform is located at the end of the village Ebernhahn in direction of Siershahn/Wirges

Siershahn

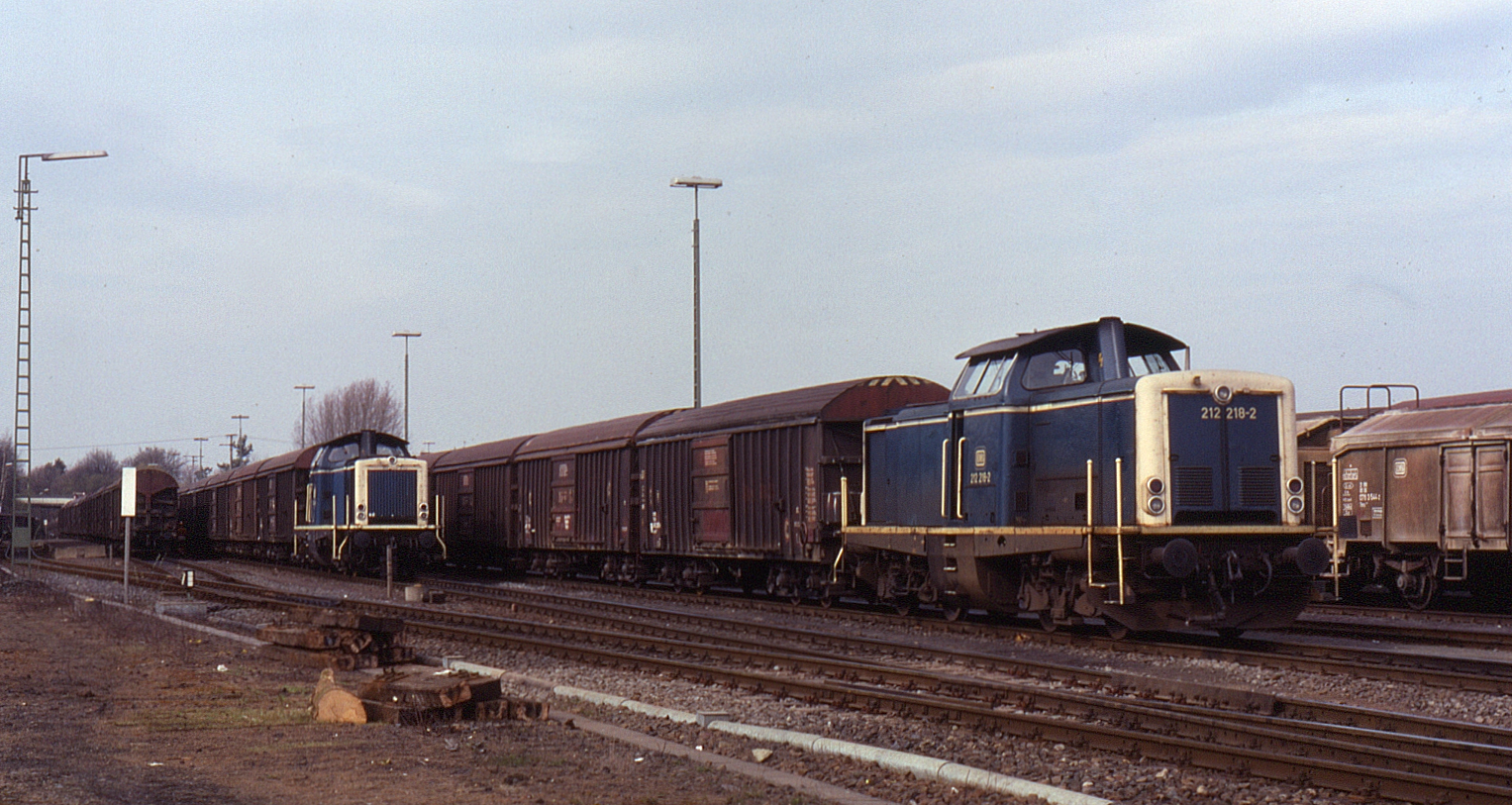
Two freight trains in Siershahn (1993)

Siershahn is particularly important for freight transport. In addition to the loading facilities of the clay industry, there is also a connecting railway line to the Schütz factories.

Mogendorf

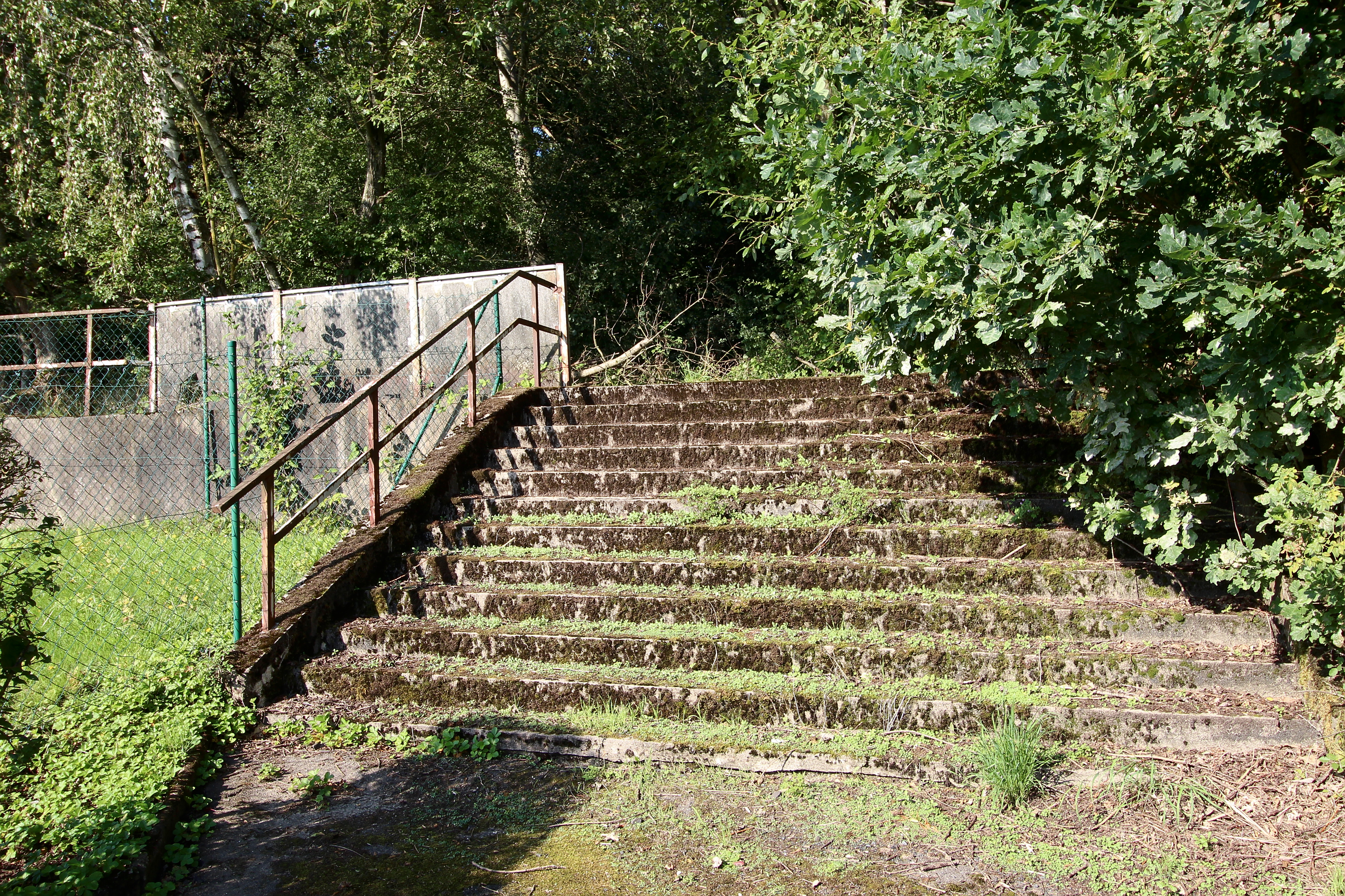
stair to former Mogendorf stop

There was a simple stop at Mogendorf, nowadays it looks in a desolate condition.

Nordhofen

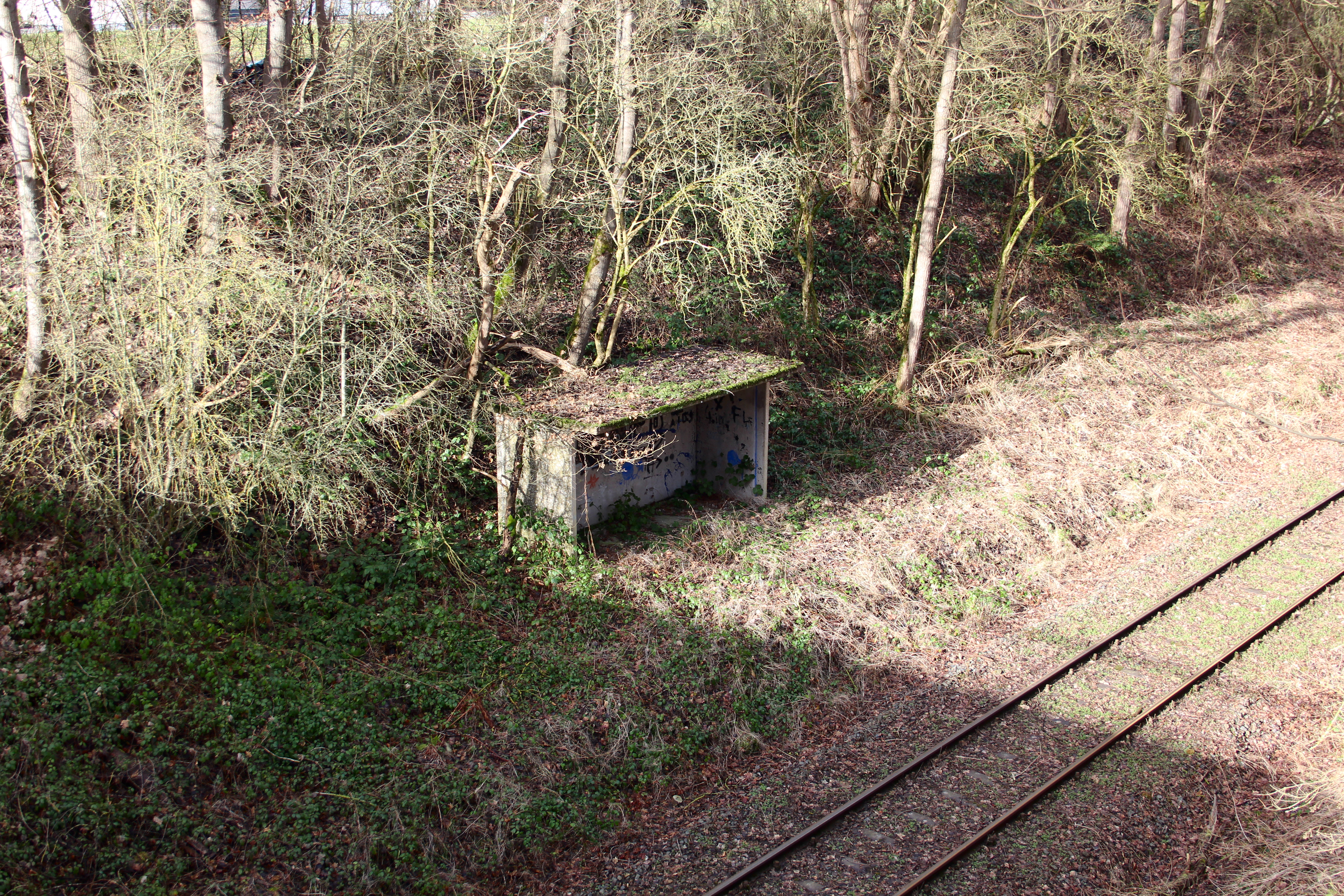
Nordhofen halt

The train stop of Nordhofen was located at the edge of the village, the stop is mostly conserved.

Selters

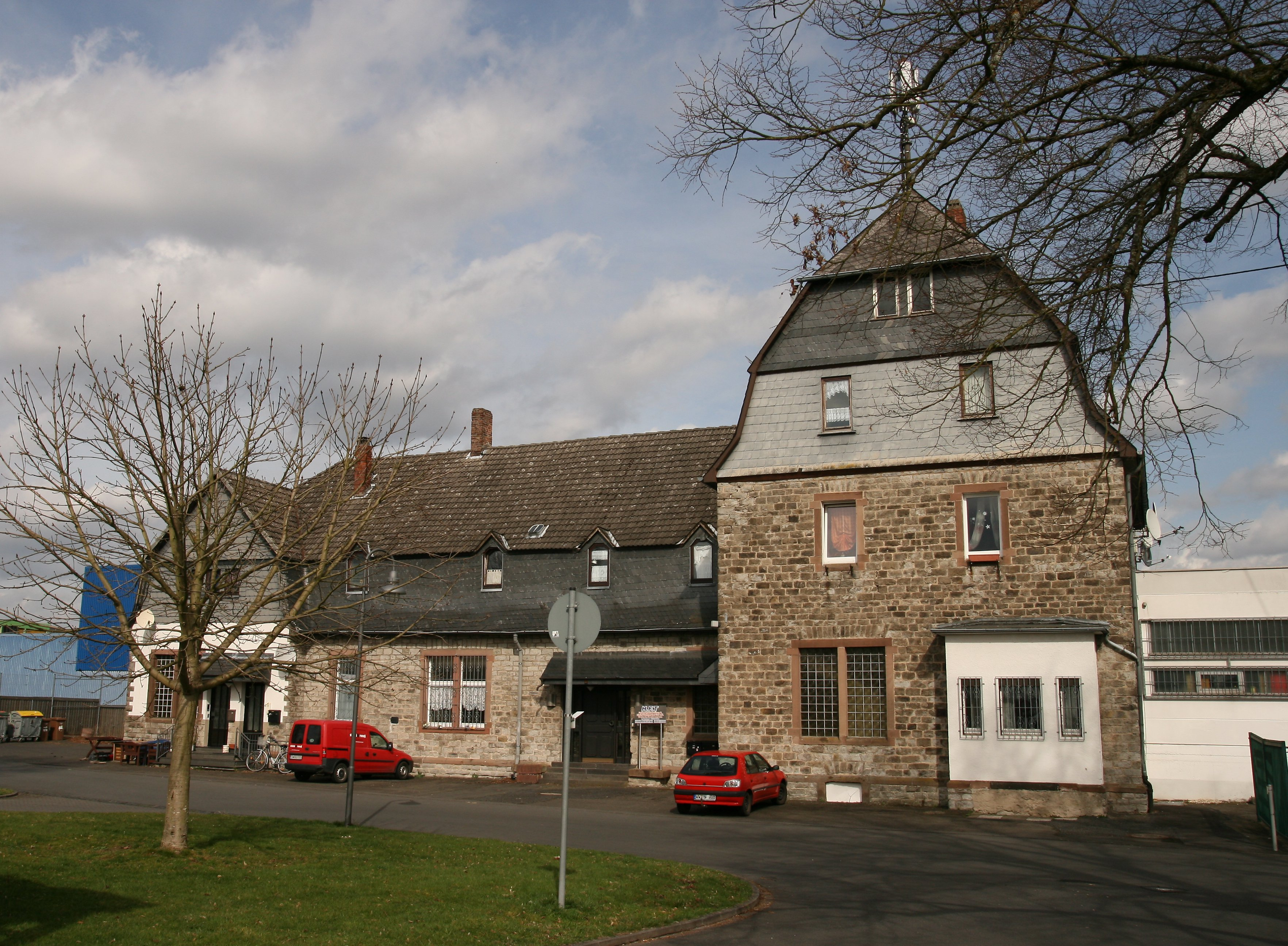
Selters station

The train station Selters was the transfer hub to the Selters - Hachenburg narrow gauge railway via Höchstenbach and Hattert to Hachenburg.

Marienrachdorf

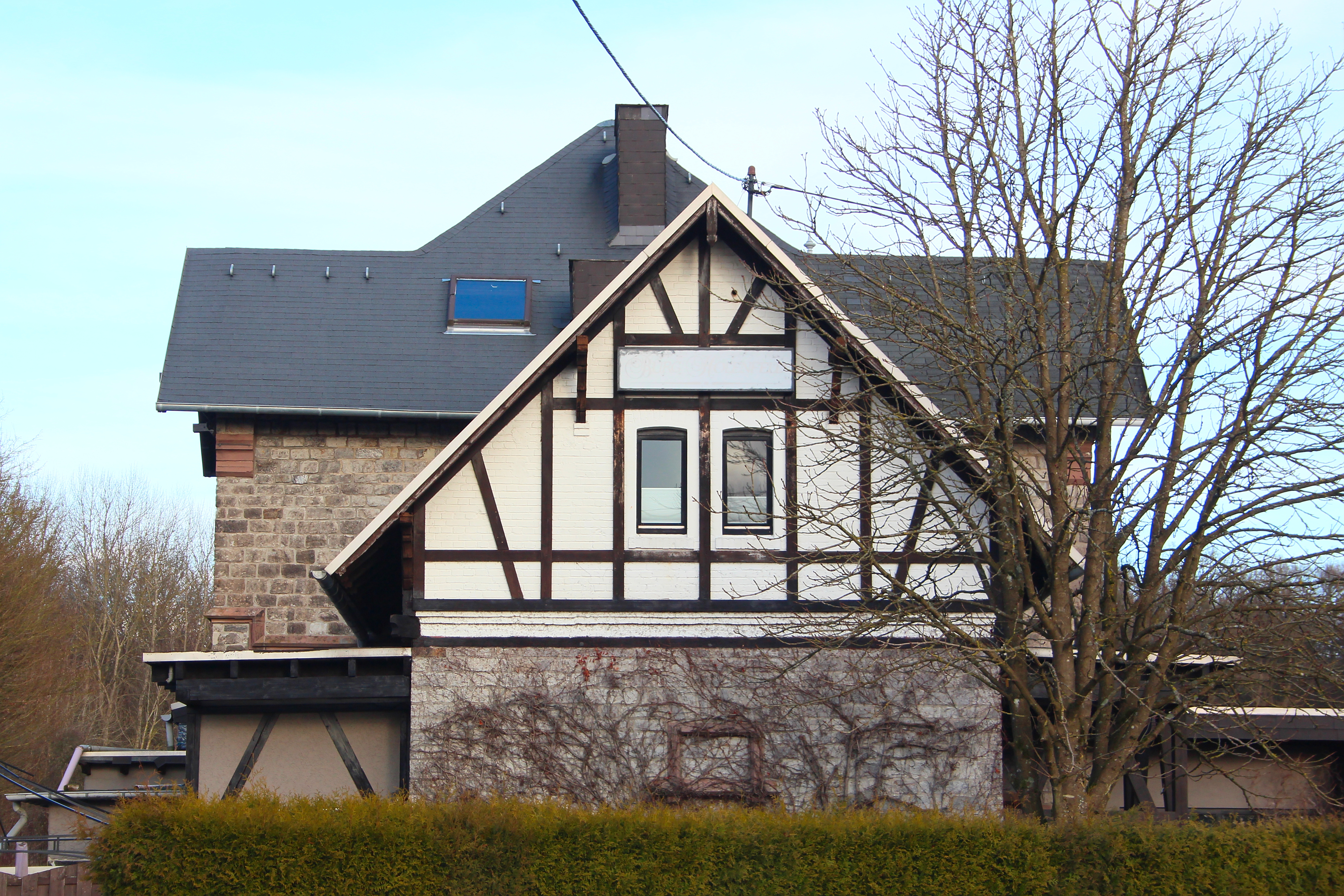
Marienrachdorf train station building

A simple train station along the Holzabachtalbahn.

Brückrachdorf

A simple stop along the Engers–Au railway line.

Dierdorf

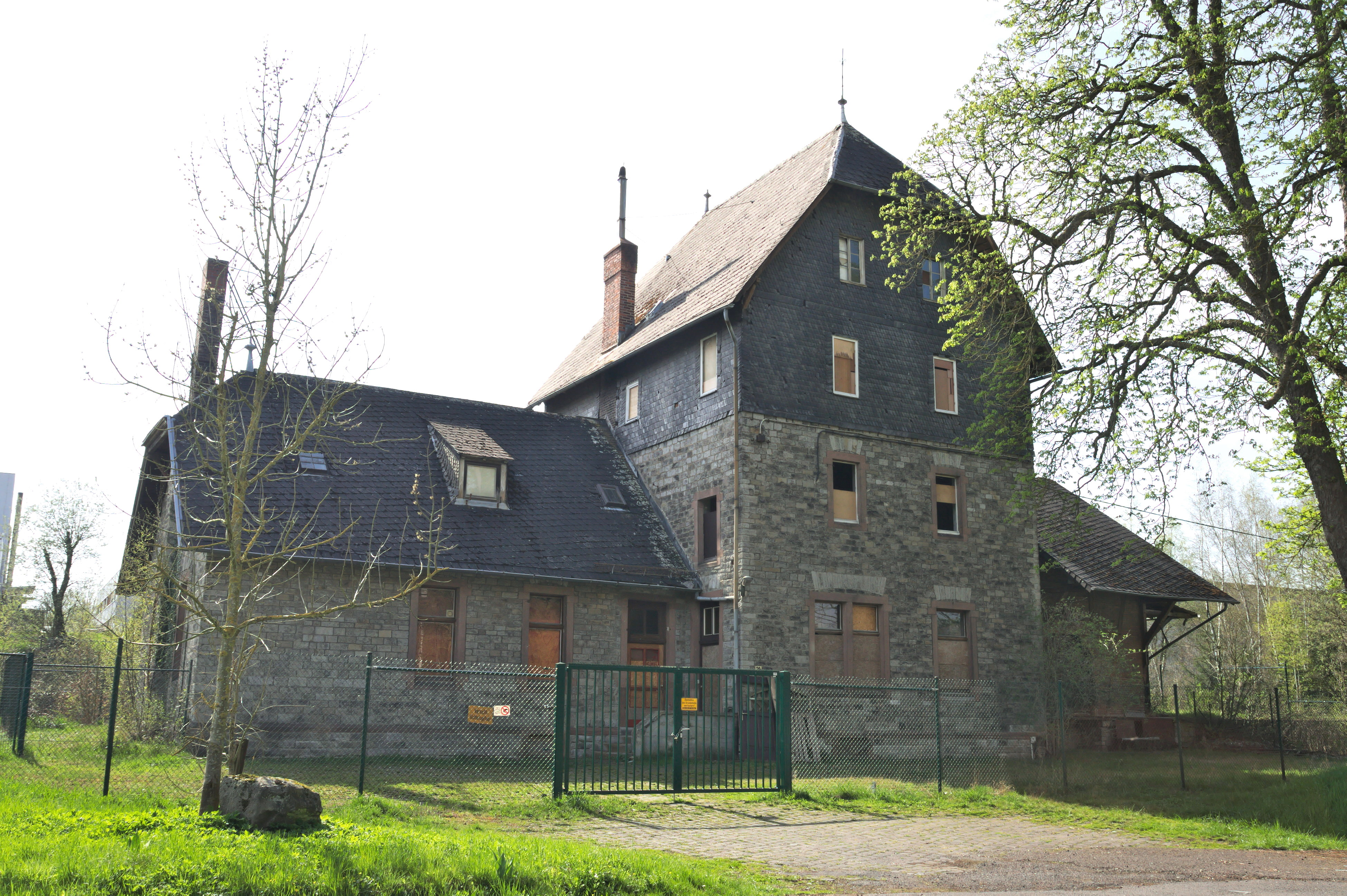
The historic station building in Dierdorf

The Dierdorf train station was an important hub for passenger and fright trains, the historic station building, which once included service facilities such as ticket teller, waiting room, luggage service and also had staff rooms, is primarily preserved, except the roof of the goods shed.

Wienau

A simple stop along the Engers–Au railway.

Raubach

Raubach train station has a historic station building made of basalt rubble stone, typically for railway station buildings in Westerwald, was serviced primarily by passenger trains because of a very limited loading ramp for freight trains.

Puderbach

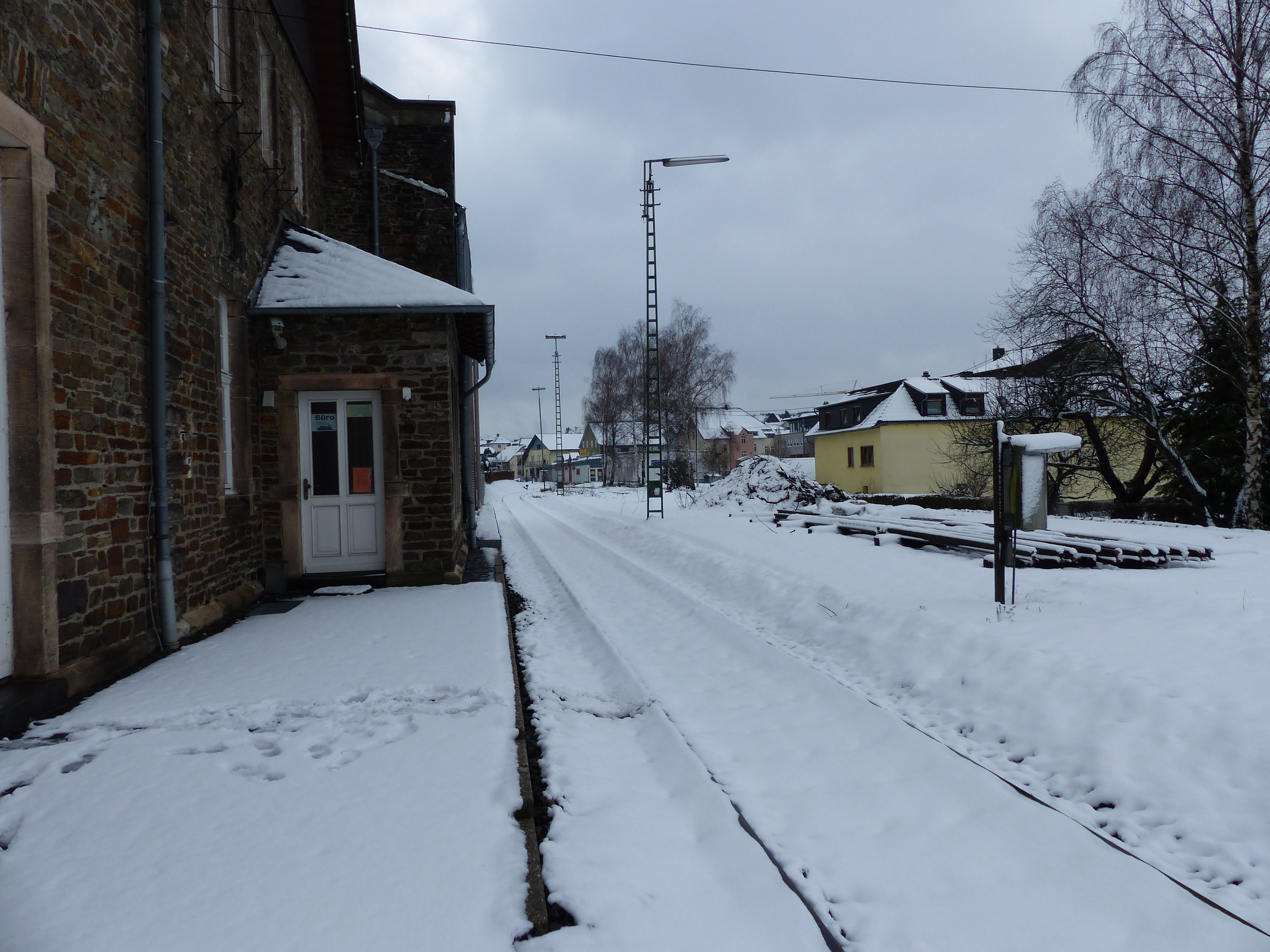
Puderbach station

The station building was constructed as a standardized design using basalt stone. A three-story, gable-fronted central section with a hipped roof was adjoined to the southwest by a timber -framed goods shed and to the northeast by a two-story, eaves-fronted extension made of rubble stone. A separate toilet building was constructed opposite the station building. There were two separate waiting rooms, one for second class and one for third and fourth class. The station building housed a restaurant, a ticket office, waiting rooms, a mechanical signal box, and living quarters and overnight accommodations for railway staff.

The station was used for handling pit props and agricultural products, as well as transporting animals. Workers from the nearby Reichenstein iron ore mine also used the station.

Reichenstein

A simple stop along the railway line.

Seifen (Westerwald)

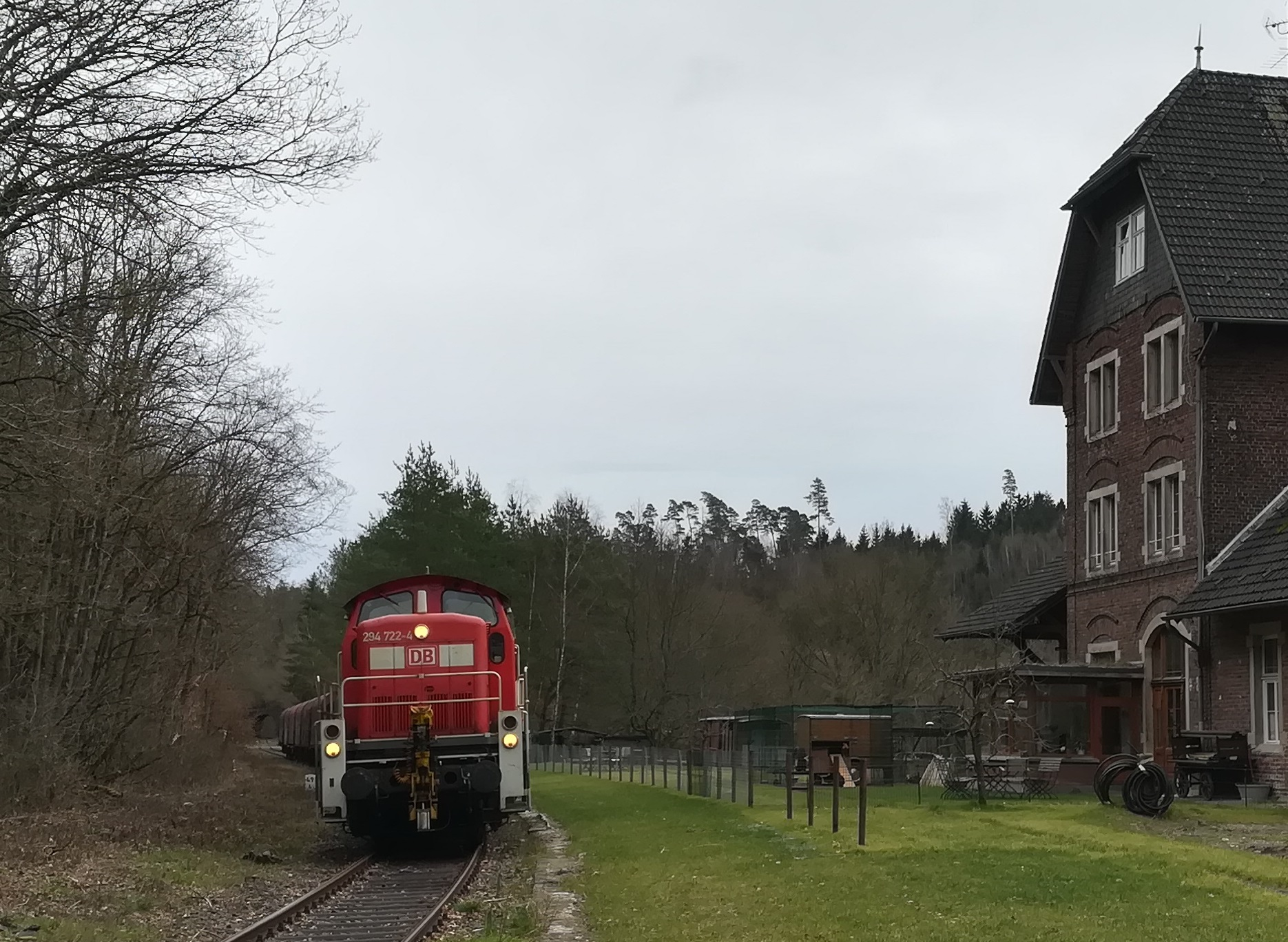
Fright train in Seifen station

The Seifen station was an important hub especially for the fright traffic because row material from the surrounding mines have been changed from trucks to trains here. The historic station building is a listed building, nowadays in private ownership.

Flammersfeld

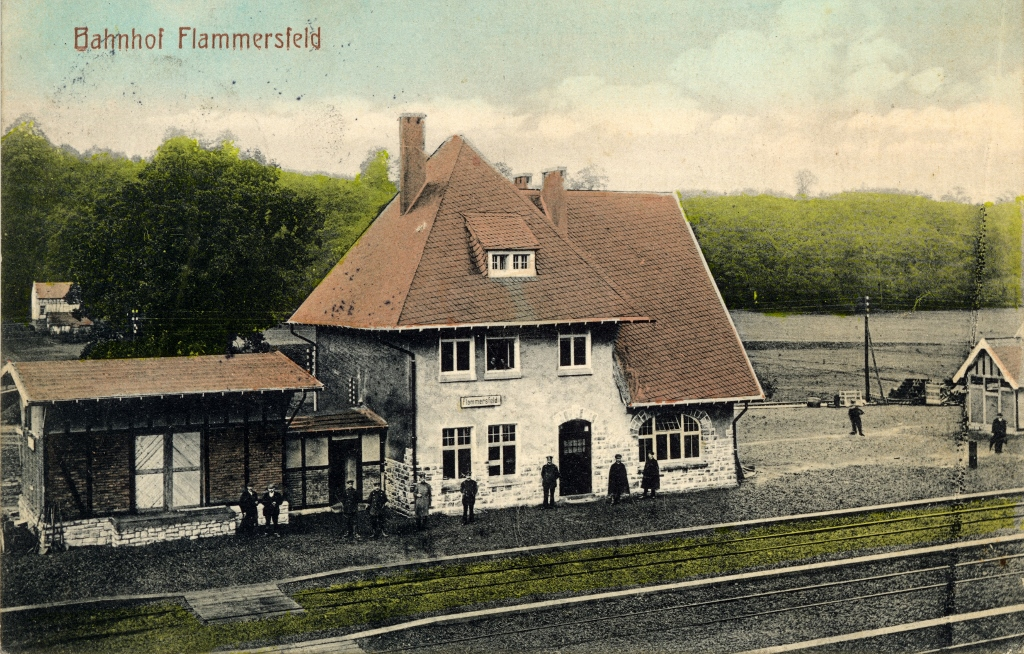
Postcard of Flammersfeld station

Flammersfeld station is located in Seelbach, Altenkirchen near Altenkirchen, the name Flammesdeld was chosen because of the neighboring Flammersfeld which is a Spa town. The station was important for freight as well as passenger transport since many convalescent guests have reached the neighboring Flammerfeld through this station and it connected the Engers–Au railway to the Kasbachtal Valley Railway to Linz (Rhine).

Berzhausen

A simple stop along the railway line.

Neitersen

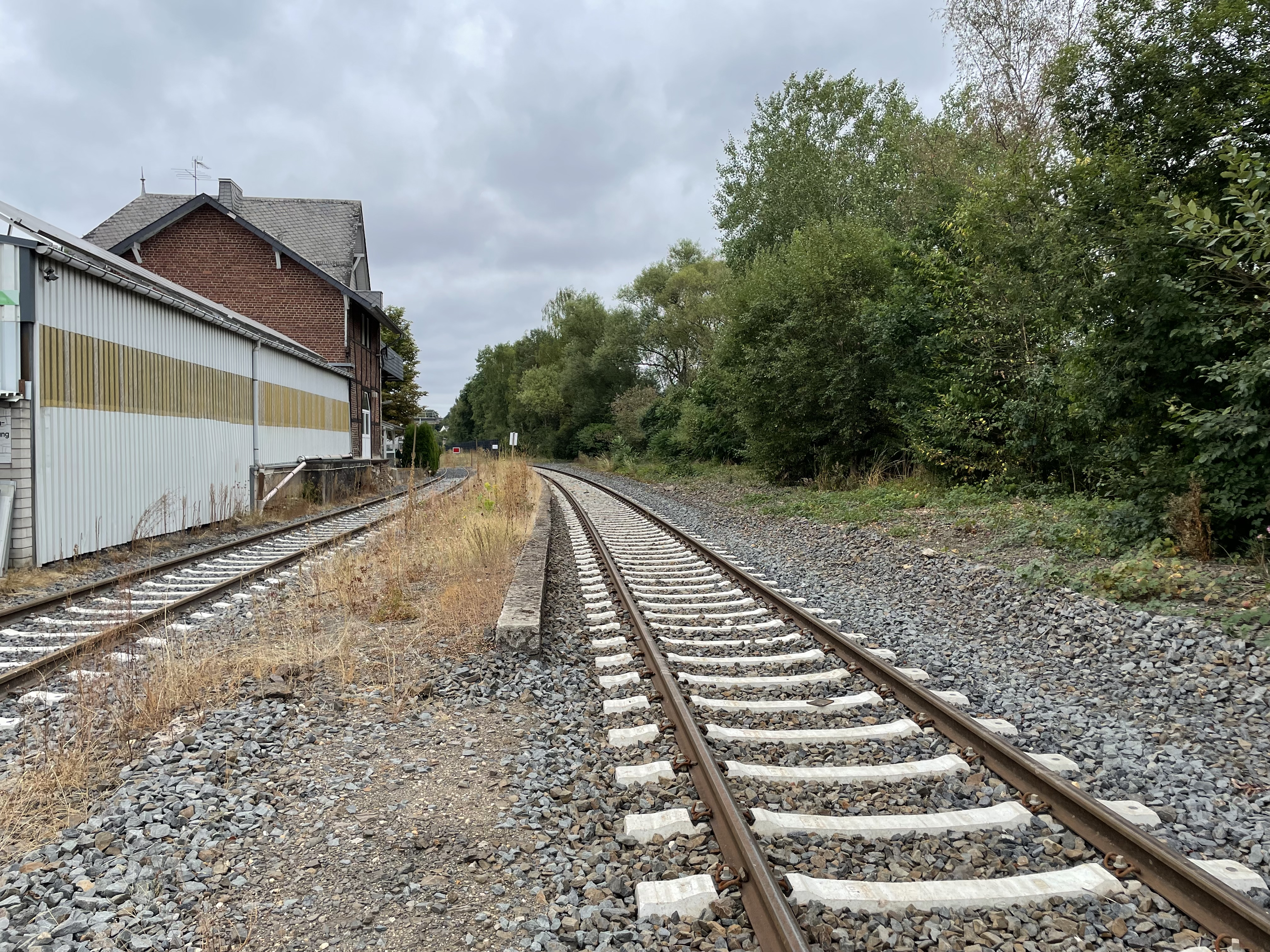
Bahnhof Neitersen

The Neitersen station has a historic station building which nowadays is under private ownership and Neitersen only connected to the local bus transport since passenger train service on Holzbachtalbahn has discontinued.

Schöneberg

A simple stop along the Engers–Au railway.

Altenkirchen (Westerw)

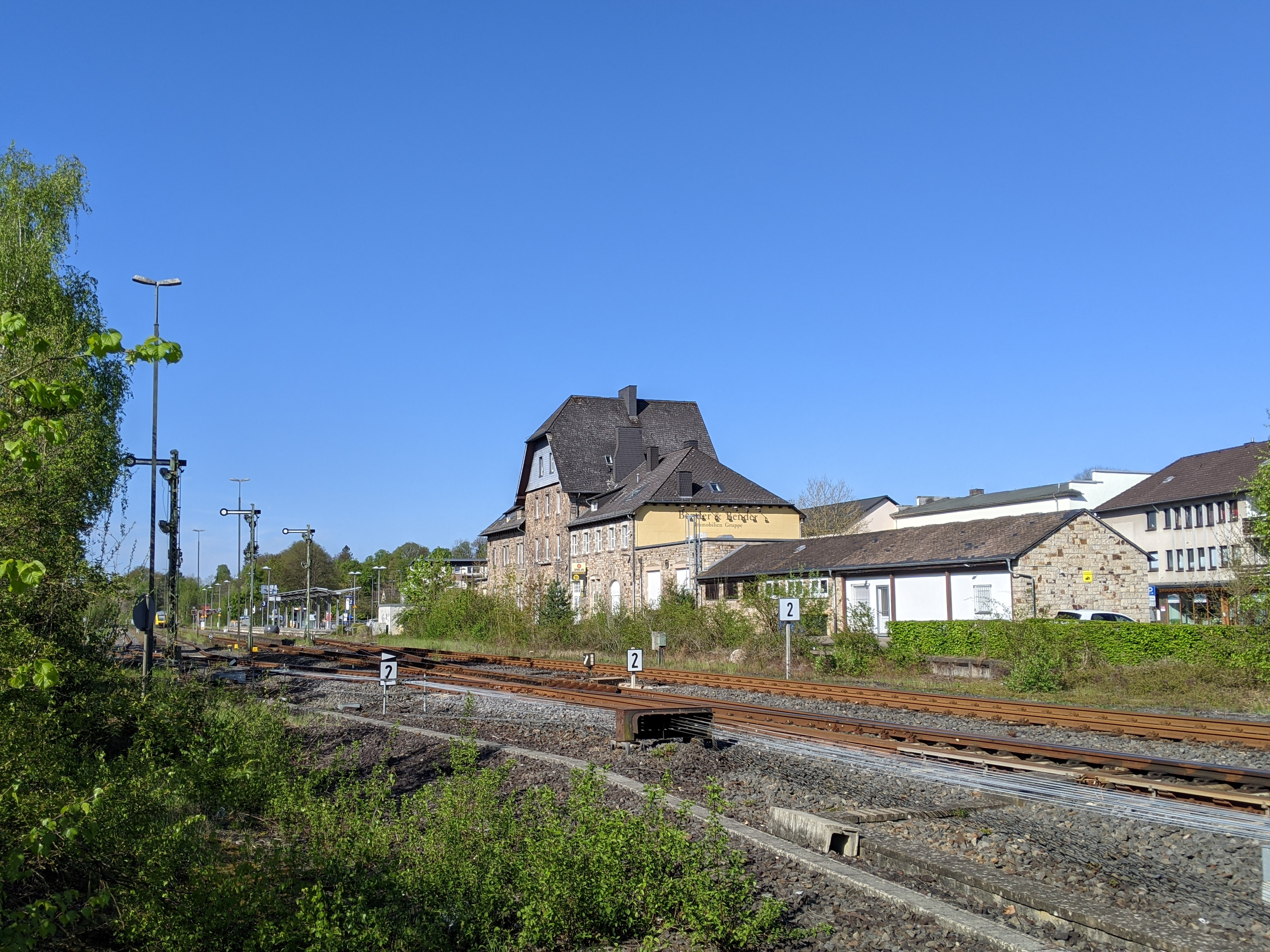
Altenkirchen station, passenger train section

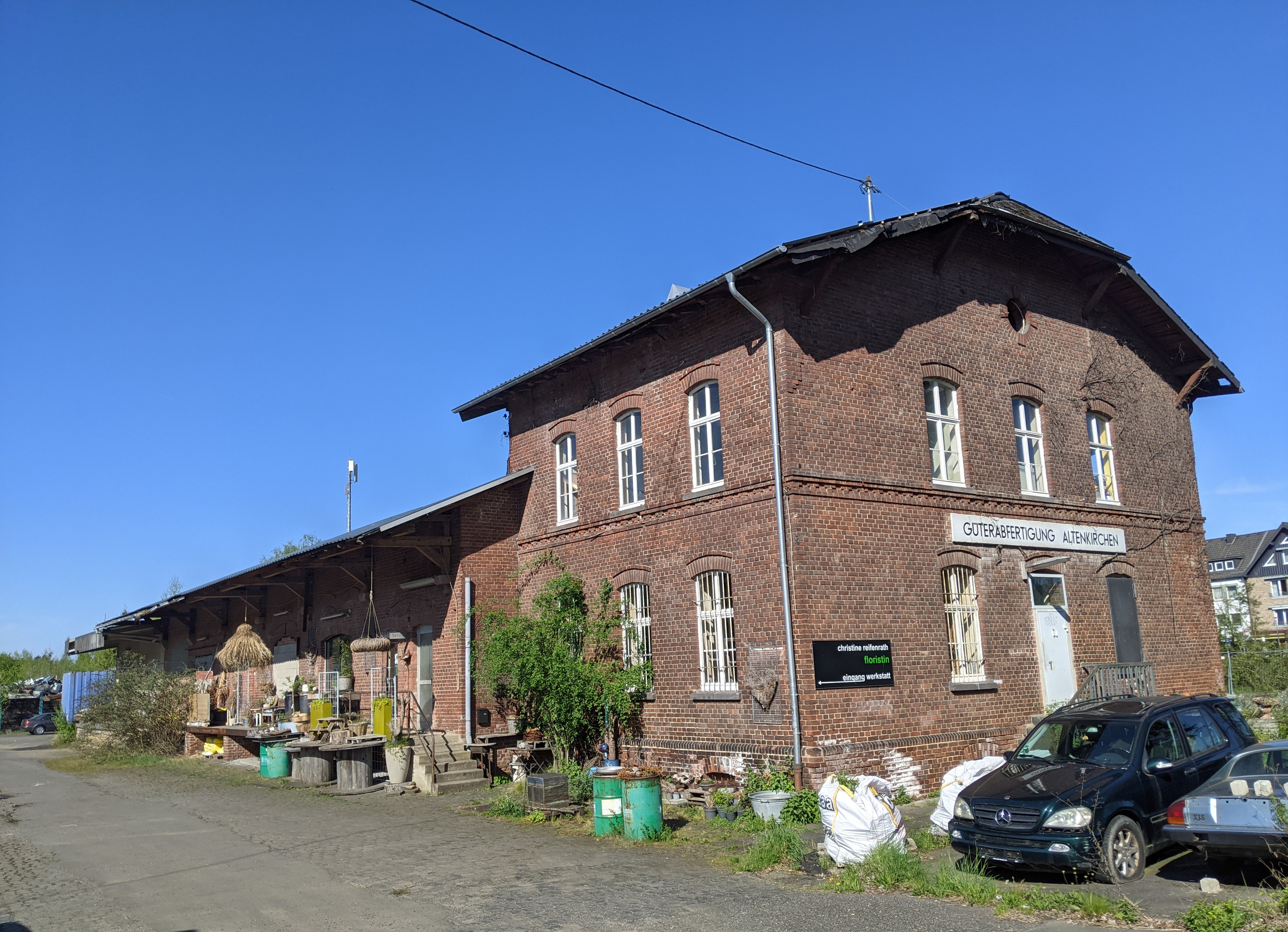
Altenkirchen station, fright train section

Initially a temporary terminus, Altenkirchen (Westerwald) developed into a local railway hub with its own locomotive depot. The station was partially destroyed during the Second World War.

Obererbach

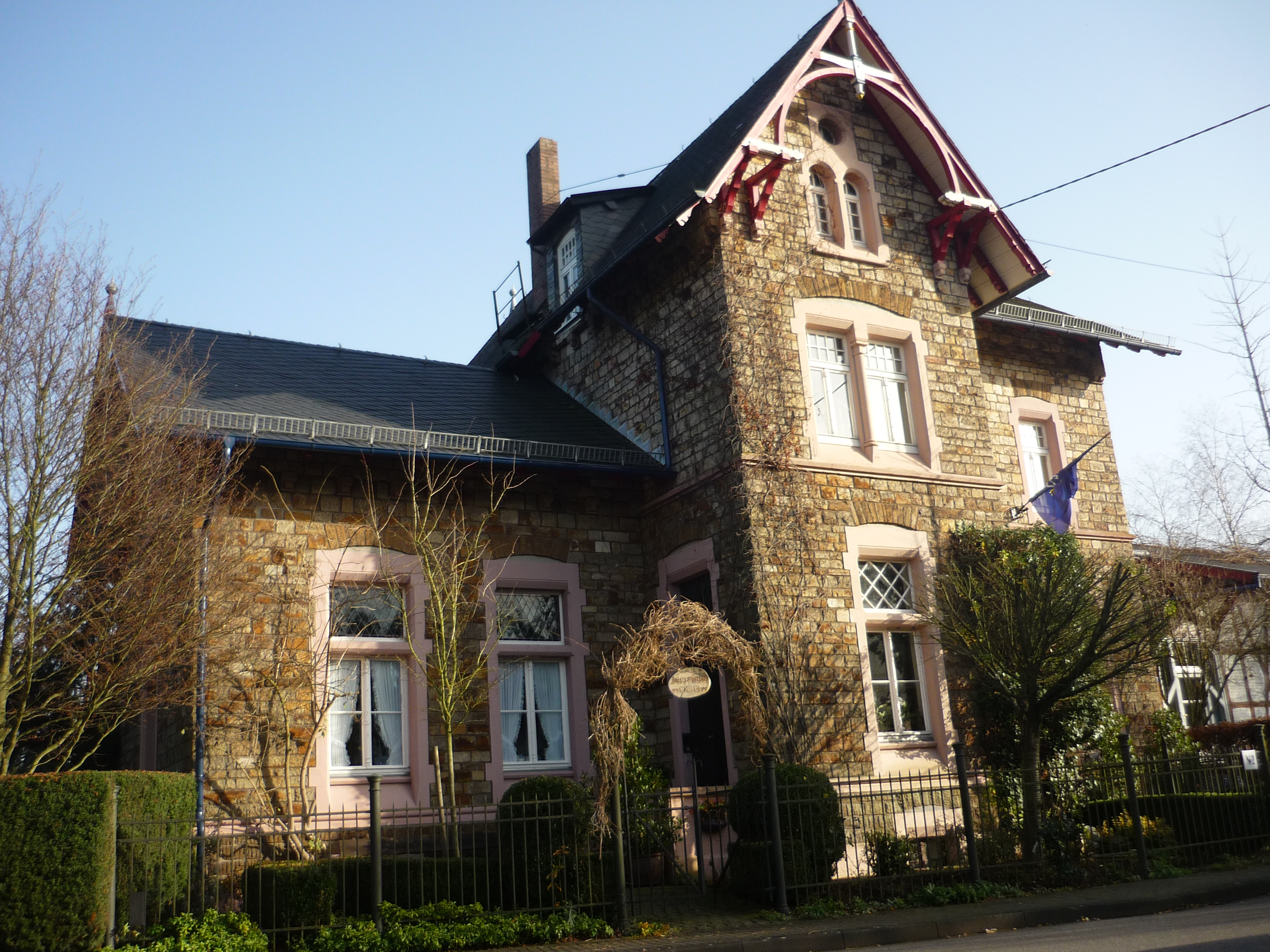
Obererbach

The Obererbach stop is located in the Niedererbach district of the municipality, a few hundred meters before the southern portal of the Marienthal Tunnel. It also has only basic facilities. The station building is a standardized structure made of rubble stone, and a timber-framed goods shed is attached to it. The building is now a listed historical monument.

Kloster Marienthal

The Kloster Marienthal (Marienthal monastery) stop is located immediately before the north portal of the Marienthal Tunnel, below the former Franciscan monastery, and, like the other stops, has only basic facilities. Marienthal is a part of the village Seelbach bei Hamm, although the train stop is located in the mark of Hilgenroth. The closure of the stop was discussed because it no longer met the safety requirements of the Federal Railway Authority and only carried eight passengers per week. In 2017, a support organisation named Klosterdorf Marienthal (Marienthal monastery village), was founded, leaders were Uwe Steiniger from Klostergastronimie Marienthal (Marienthal monastery gastronomy), Pastor Frank Aumüller and Dietmar Schumacher from the local club of SPD in the municipality of Altenkirchen-Flammersfeld. This support organisation also started an online petition to preserve the train stop and gathered 2,500 votes. With the timetable change on 15 December 2019, the stop was converted back into a request stop. The stop is an important component of the pilgrim village Marienthal where the former Franciscans monastery is located.

Breitscheidt

Breitscheidt is the only intermediate stop on the section of track that is classified as a station. Trains can pass each other at the station.

Hohegrete

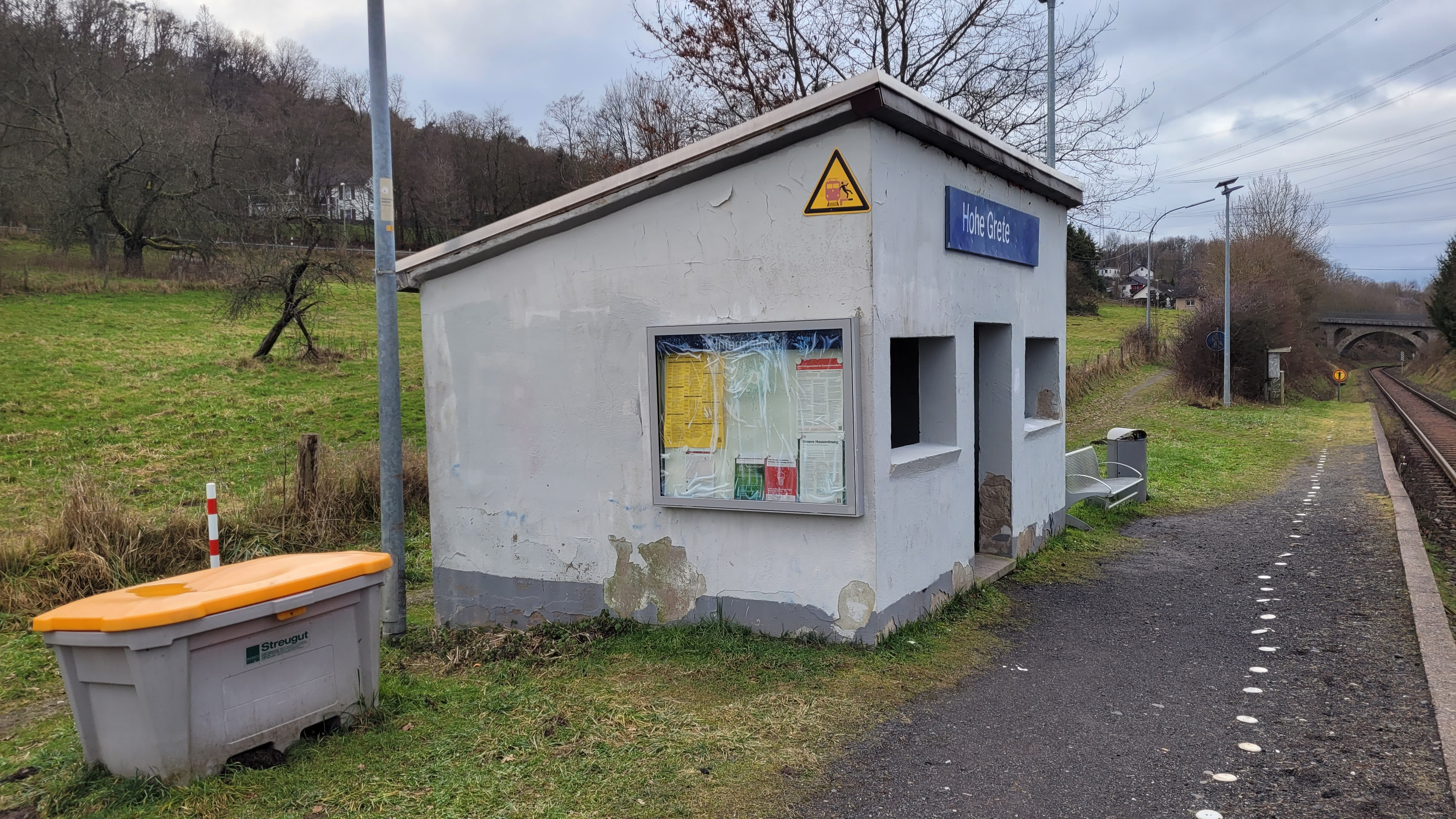
Hohegrete stop

Hohegrete station consists of one platform with a waiting shelter. The station sign shows the spelling Hohe Grete.

Geilhausen

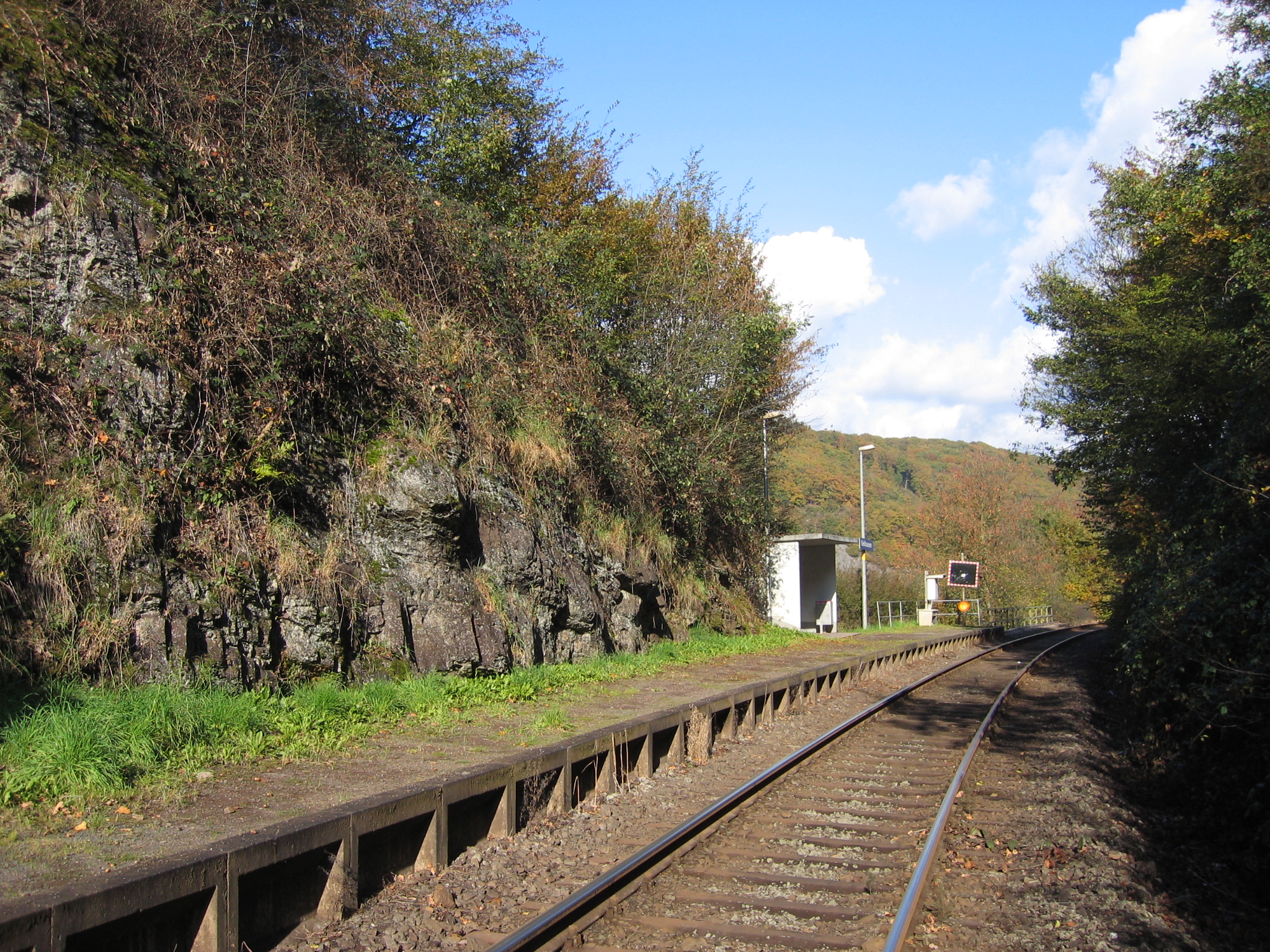
Geilhausen halt

Geilhausen station consists of a platform with a waiting shelter.

Au (Sieg)

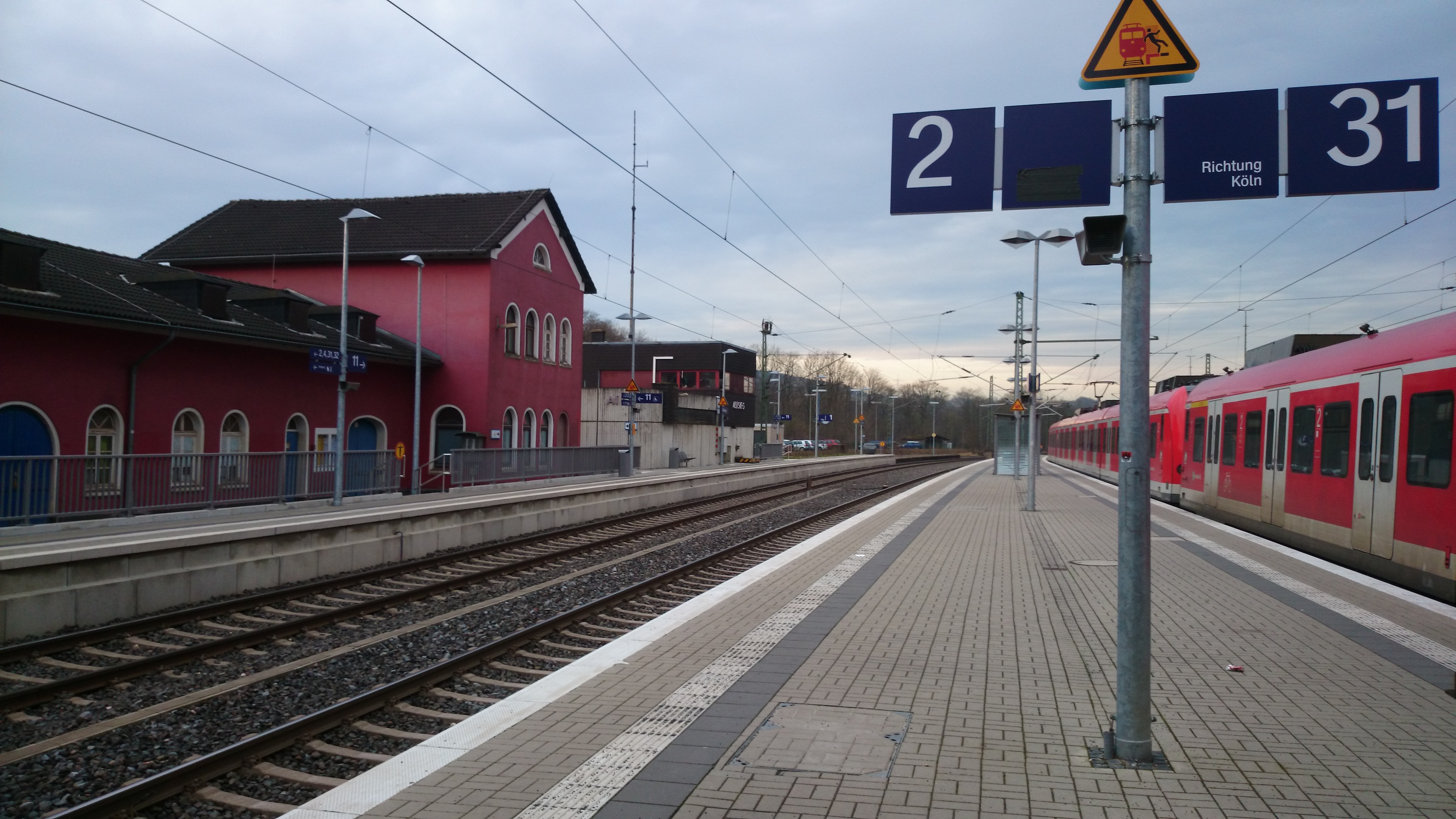
Au (Sieg) station connects the Engers-Au railway to Cologne, Siegen, Aachen and other towns and villages, right: train os suburban train in direction of Cologne

Au (Sieg) station was opened in 1860 with the inauguration of the Sieg line. After the Upper Westerwald Railway was connected to Altenkirchen, it became an important railway junction. The station is divided into a freight yard, a passenger station on the Sieg line with five platform tracks for Deutsche Bahn trains, and a small branch station with only one platform and one track, from which trains on the Engers–Au line depart.

== Operations ==
The line is served by the RB 90 (Siershahn–Montabaur–Limburg (Lahn)) approximately every hour.

Line	Route	Interval
RB 90	Westerwald-Sieg-Bahn; Siegen Hbf – Betzdorf (Sieg) – Wissen – Au (Sieg) – Geilhausen – Hohe Grete – Breitscheidt – Kloster Marienthal – Obererbach – Altenkirchen – Hachenburg – Nistertal-Bad Marienberg – Westerburg – Staffel – Diez Ost – Limburg (Lahn)	60 min

=== Fares ===
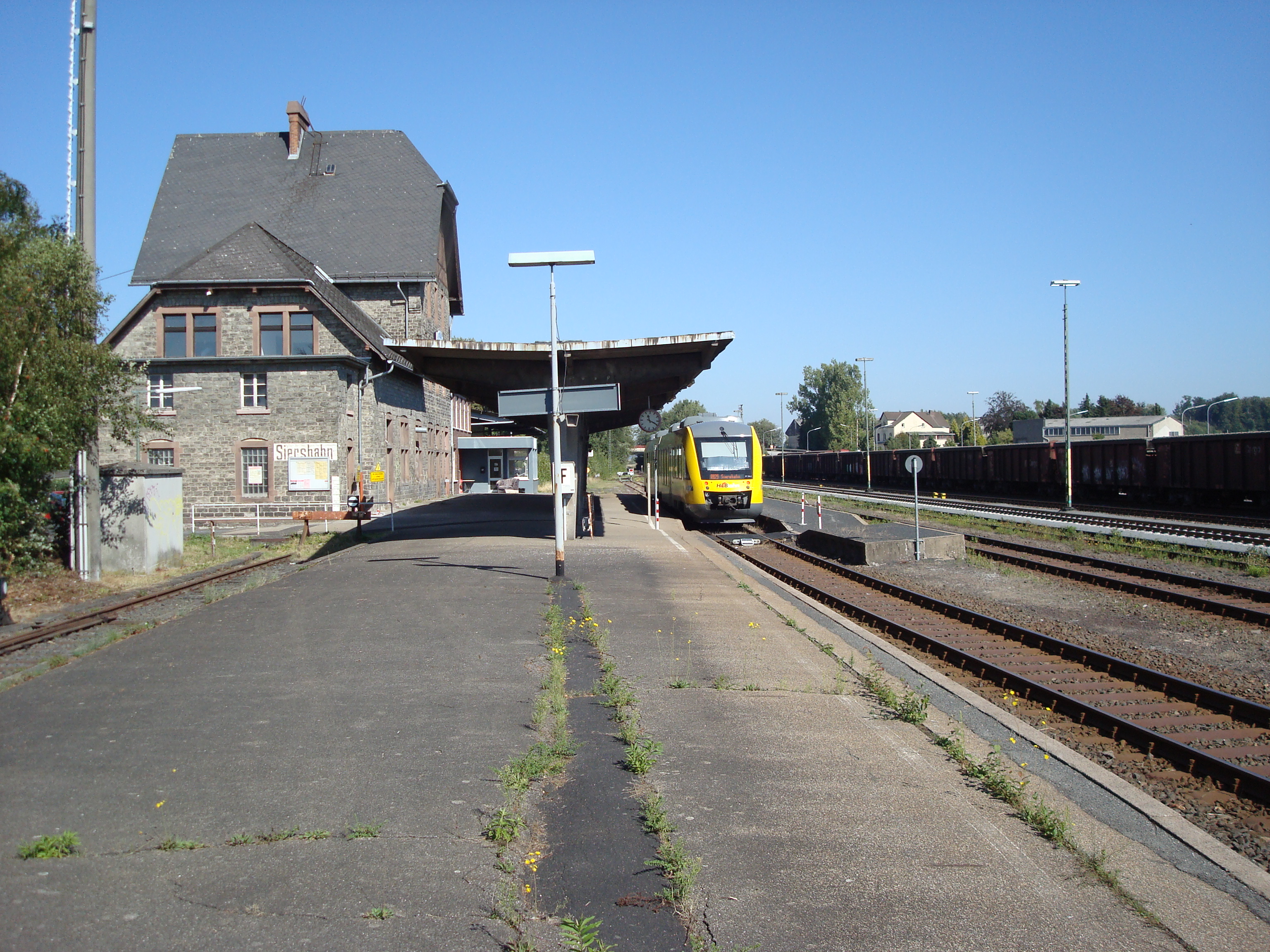
Siershahn station with train of line RB29 via Montabaur and Diez Ost to Limburg

The section from Engers to Altenkirchen actually is located on the area of the transport association Verkehrsverbund Rhein-Mosel (VRM), but there is no passenger transport. On the section from Altenkirchen to Hohe Grete the VRM fare applies, the stations Geilhausen and Au (Sieg) are located in the transport association VRS (Verkehrsverbund Rhein-Sieg) and the fare association Rheinland-Tarif, the VRS/Rheinland-Tarif fare also applies for rides from and to the VRS area and the stations between Altenkirchen and Hohe Grete as well as any other train station and train stop in the Altenkirchen district.

== Interest group ==
In May of 2007, the interest group Brexbachtalbahn e. V. was founded, whose goal is the preservation of the Engers-Au railway and the reactivation for the public transport on it.
