= Spilman =

Spilman may refer to:

== People ==
- Byrd Spilman Dewey (1856–1942), American author, land investor, and town founder
- Harry Spilman (born 1954), American baseball player
- Hendrik Spilman (1721–1784), Dutch painter and engraver
- John Spilman (died 1626), German-born papermaker and jeweller in England
- Jonathan E. Spilman (1812–1896), American lawyer, minister, and composer
- Tom Spilman (born ?), American computer programmer, game developer, and businessman

== Places ==
- Spilman, West Virginia, an unincorporated community in the United States

== See also ==
- Spillman (disambiguation)
- Spillmann
- Spielmann
- Szpilman
- Spellman
- Spelman (disambiguation)
