= Spelman =

Spelman may refer to:

== People with the surname ==
- Caroline Spelman, British politician
- David Spelman (born 1966), American music producer
- Edward Spelman (died 1767), English translator
- Elizabeth V. Spelman, American philosopher
- Henry Spelman, British antiquarian
- Henry Spelman of Jamestown (1595–1623), English adventurer, soldier, and author
- Sir John Spelman (historian) (1594–1643), English historian and politician, MP for Worcester
- Sir John Spelman (judge) (died 1546), English judge
- John Spelman (MP for Castle Rising) (1606–1663), English politician
- Laura Spelman Rockefeller (1839–1915), American philanthropist
- Mick Spelman, English footballer
- Taffy Spelman (1914–?), English footballer
- Timothy Mather Spelman (1891–1970), American composer

== Other uses ==
- Spelman (music), performer of Swedish folk music
- Spelman College, in Atlanta, Georgia, U.S.

== See also ==
- Spellman, a surname
- Spielmann, a surname
- Spilman (disambiguation)
- Szpilman, a surname
