= Spillman =

Spillman may refer to:

== People ==
- C. J. Spillman (born 1986), American football player
- Edwin Spillman (born 2005), Sierra Leonean-American football player
- George Spillman (1856–1911), British cricketer
- Jack Owen Spillman (born 1969), American serial killer
- Karl Spillman Forester (1940–2014), American judge
- Ken Spillman (born 1959), Australian author
- Lynette Spillman (born c.1960), American sociologist and professor
- Mel Spillman (born 1948), American probate clerk and fraudster
- Miskel Spillman (1897–1992), American TV guest-hosting contest winner from Saturday Night Live
- William Jasper Spillman (1863–1931), American economist and founder of agricultural economics

== Places ==
- Spillman, Louisiana, an unincorporated community, United States
- Spillman Creek, a river in Kansas, United States

== See also ==
- Herschell-Spillman, a former amusement ride manufacturer
- Spilman (disambiguation)
- Spillmann, a surname
- Stillman (disambiguation)
- Spelman (disambiguation)
