= Lewes Priory Cricket Club =

English cricket club

- Sport: Club Cricket
- Founded: 1831
- Location: Lewes, East Sussex, United Kingdom
- Home ground: Stanley Turner Ground
- Divisions: Mixed 1st Team - Sussex Cricket League - Division 6 (East) Women's 1st Team - Sussex Women's Cricket League Division 2 (East)
- Website: https://lewespriory.play-cricket.com/

Lewes Priory Cricket Club is a cricket club in Lewes, East Sussex, United Kingdom. Founded in 1831, cricket was originally played at the Dripping Pan, on land adjacent to Lewes Priory. In 1937, the club moved one mile west to the Stanley Turner Ground, where they are still based today.

With a membership of over 300 adults and juniors, Lewes Priory field several teams; including in the Mixed Sussex Cricket League and Sussex Women's Cricket League, as well as Sunday friendly, Twenty20, soft ball, junior and indoor cricket teams.

In 2022 Lewes Priory became one of the first cricket clubs in England to switch their Junior team's kit from traditional whites to a coloured kit to reduce the number of girls giving up playing due to anxieties around menstruation, an issue which has been discussed across the sport.

== Ground ==
The pavilion at the Stanley Turner Ground, constructed in 1937.

Location of The Stanley Turner Ground

The Stanley Turner Ground (often referred to as the STG) is a multi-use recreation ground located in the South-West of the town, between the Kingston road and the Cockshut Stream wetland. The ground was gifted to the town of Lewes in 1934 for recreational sport by Councillor Albert Turner in memory of his brother Stanley, with a wooden grandstand built in 1937.

The ground, owned by Lewes District Council, is also home to Lewes RFC and annually hosts Lewes music festival as well as Lewes F.C.'s summer junior football tournament.

== Honours ==
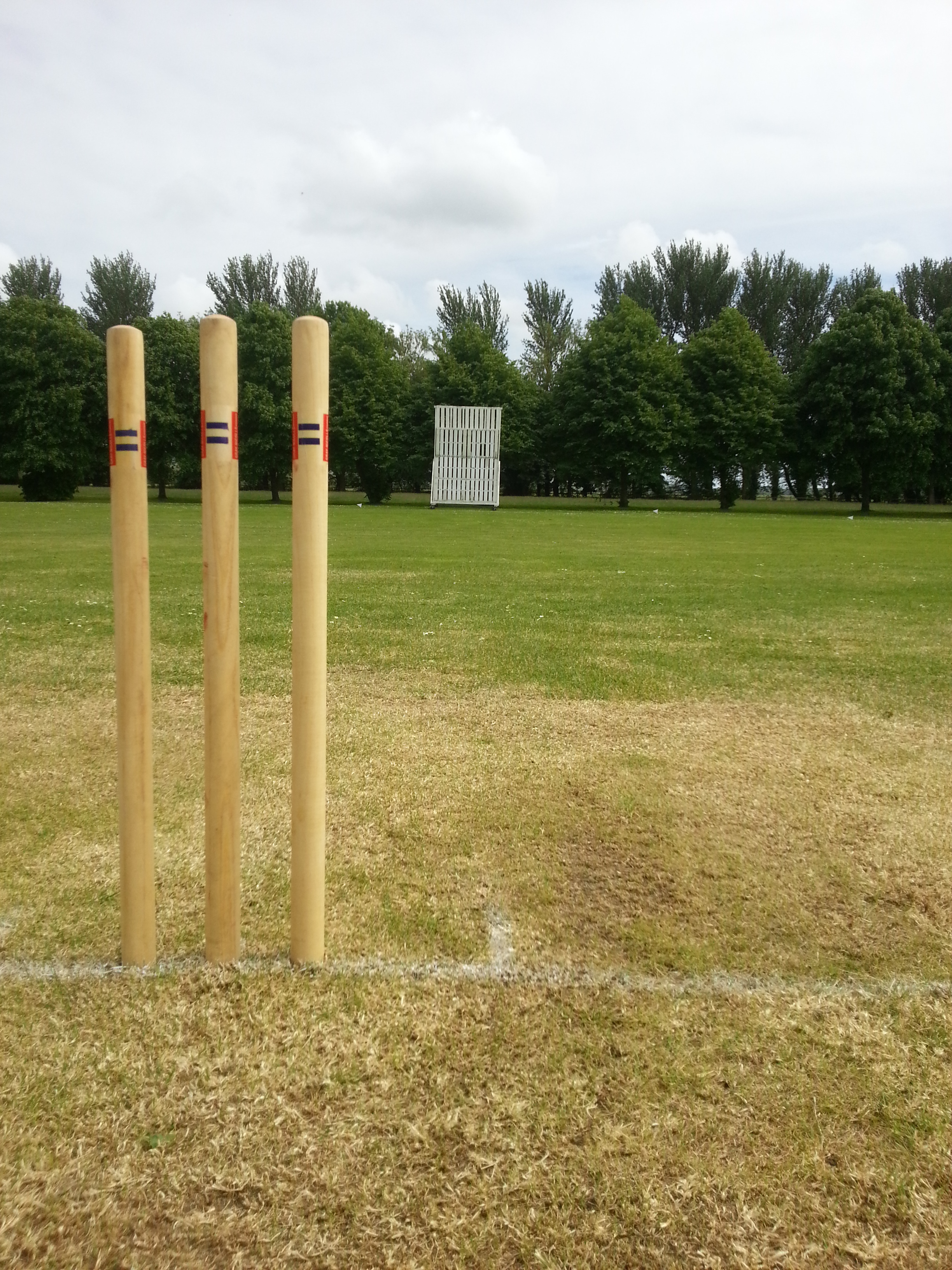
The wicket at the Stanley Turner Ground (2013), home of Lewes Priory Cricket Club

- Sussex Cricket League
  - Premier Division champions 1986, 1990
  - Division 2 champions 1999, 2006, 2008
- Sussex Women's Cricket League
  - Division 2 (East) champions 2026

== Teams ==
Team	Format/Competition
Mixed 1st XI	Sussex Cricket League: Division 6 East
Women's 1st XI	Sussex Women's Cricket League: Division 2 East
Mixed 2nd XI	Sussex Cricket League: Division 9 Central
Mixed 3rd XI	Sussex Cricket League: Division 12 East (South)
Lions	Sussex Slam (Twenty20)
Lightning	Sussex Women's Slam (Twenty20)
Women's Soft Ball	SCF Women's Soft Ball Cricket League
Ruins	Friendly cricket
Vets	50+ Friendly cricket
Development	Friendly cricket
Girls Under 14s	Junior cricket
Girls Under 12s	Junior cricket
Girls Under 11s	Junior Cricket
Mixed Under 17s	Junior Cricket
Mixed Under 15s	Junior Cricket
Mixed Under 14s	Junior cricket
Mixed Under 13s	Junior cricket
Mixed Under 12s	Junior cricket
Mixed Under 11s	Junior cricket
Mixed Under 9s	Junior cricket

== History ==
The origin of the club extends back to at least 1831 when Mr J. Longford (one of the local brewers) bought 10 acres of the Lewes Priory Grounds from the Earl of Chichester and made some of the grounds known as the Dripping Pan available for cricket

=== Timeline of club history ===
Date	Event
1816	Window bill for a cricket match to be played on Lewes Hill, near the race stand on Wednesday 4 September 1816. The match was to be between the Gentlemen of Patcham, Poynings, Pycombe and Newtimber with one given Man against the Lewes club. The game was to be played for 50 guineas and the wickets were to be pitched at 9am. The printer was Baxter of Lewes. The originals of the window bill is in the Sussex Record Offices.
1817	Window bill advertises a Grand Match of Cricket to be played on Lewes Hill near the Race Stand on Tuesday 2 September 1817 between the Gentlemen of the Brighton against the Gentlemen of the Town of Lewes. It also states that if the morning should appear unfavourable the match would be played in Houndean Bottom. The return match was to be played on Monday 8 September. It also states that "Lambert's Cricketer's Guide, containing the Laws, Bats, Balls, &c, may be had on the Ground". Printed by Baxter of Lewes. The Lewes team is given as: Verral, Rider, Baxter, Green, Lambert, Raynes, Martin, Holmden, Hoye, Venus and Thomas Dexter. The Brighton team is given as Stevens, James Dale, W. Dench, Newel, H Morley, Roff, Hart, J Slater, Evershed, Harriott and Burr. A note states that W. Dench was "whipper-in" to the Brighton hounds. Brighton won by 4 wickets: Lewes 57 and 47; Brighton 57 and 48 for 6.
1818	A draft window bill advertises the return match of cricket between the Gentlemen of Lindfield against an unidentified side of gentlemen. It is undated but was found with material dated after 24 August 1818.
1831	Club formally established and based at Dripping Pan site in Lewes, close to priory remains
1836	Entry in the Sussex Weekly Advertiser (Monday 18 July) states: "The return match between the Chalvington Club and the Priory Club will come off this day in the above grounds... and the return match between the Priory and Southern Clubs will be played in the park at Firle Place, on the 25th Inst."
1839	Window bill advertises match between "Eleven youths of Lewes and eleven of Brighton, all under 14 Years of Age. Match dated 5th September. Organised by W Lillywhite on his ground. A contemporary jotting notes the match was won easily by the Lewes youths. The Brighton list includes J Wisden, as well as Jas and John Lillywhite."
1881 August	Lewes priory cricket club "Cricket Week" included notable opponents in the sporting team I Zingari and the Hurst College (a Woodard foundation school)
1908	Leicestershire fast bowler Arthur Woodcock represented MCC in match against Lewes Priory CC. At this game at the dripping pan he is noted to have "bowled a bail off the wicket 149 feet six inches, sending it over a fourteen feet bank and a wall on the boundary".
1908 (12-13 August)	Lewes Priory played the United Services at Portsmouth. Priory made 138 and 296 against the United Service's 541. Notable scores were: Commander HDR Watson 101, Lieutenant OE Leggett 101, Commander BS Evans 102 and Staff Sergeant NJ Roche 100>.
1934 (4 April)	Date of Stanley Turner Trust Deed to create the Stanley Turner Recreation Ground. This states that "no buildings shall be erected thereon except pavilions, stands or other buildings necessary for the use of the land as a public recreation ground and that in no event shall it be used for the erection of houses" and that "So far as is practicable English timber only shall be used in the erection of gates fences pergolas seats and other wooden erections on the said land"
1944	Lewes Priory CC donated £25 to the Daily Sketch War Relief Fund
1971	Lewes Priory becomes one of the founding members of the newly formed Sussex Cricket League

=== Club captains ===
1960	H. Pett	1983	B. Holding	2006	M. Murray
1961	J. Winter	1984	R. Seager	2007	M. Murray
1962	J. Winter	1985	R. Seager	2008	M. Murray
1963	R.C. Cosham	1986	R. Seager	2009	M. Murray
1964	R.C. Cosham	1987	R. Seager	2010	C. Baker
1965	R.C. Cosham	1988	C. Hartridge	2011	M. Murray
1966	J. A. O’Connor	1989	C. Hartridge	2012	T. Sharp
1967	J. A. O’Connor	1990	J. Roycroft	2013	A. Hartridge
1968	J. A. O’Connor	1991	J. Roycroft	2014	J. Bates
1969	R.C. Cosham	1992	J. Roycroft	2015	J. Cruickshank
1970	S.B. Hughes	1993	J. Boyd	2016	I. Khan
1971	S.B. Hughes	1994	J. Dean	2017	I. Khan
1972	S.B. Hughes	1995	J. Roycroft	2018	I. Khan
1973	C.H. Johnson	1996	M. Murray	2019	I. Khan
1974	C.H. Johnson	1997	M. Murray	2020	I. Khan
1975	J. A. O’Connor	1998	M. Murray	2021	C. Baker
1976	J. A. O’Connor	1999	E. Sutton	2022	I. Khan
1977	J. A. O’Connor	2000	K. Ibrahim	2023	I. Khan
1978	J. A. O’Connor	2001	M. Murray	2024	I. Khan
1979	J. A. O’Connor	2002	M. Murray	2025	I. Khan
1980	B. Holding	2003	M. Murray	2026	I. Khan
1981	B. Holding	2004	M. Murray		
1982	B. Holding	2005	M. Murray		

=== Club Presidents ===
To 1981	Rt Hon. Viscount Gage
1982-1985	S. B. Hughes
1986-1994	J. P. Beilby
1995	R. J. Hayward
1996-1999	R. C. Cosham
2000 -2024	J. A. O'Connor
2025-	A. de Belder

=== Notable members ===
- Herbert Whitfield
- Henry Holroyd, 3rd Earl of Sheffield
- Freeman Freeman-Thomas, 1st Marquess of Willingdon
- Alfred Mynn
- George Spillman represented Middlesex CCC. Died c1911
- George Kent (1907-1980): Captain of Lewes Priory Cricket Club and Lewes Rugby Football Club. Kent served as president of the Sussex County Rugby Football Club, was a committee member of the Sussex County Cricket Club, chairman of the Lewes Building Society and the Sussex County Building Society. He was Conservative district counsellor for Kingston in 1973 and served as chairman of Lewes District Council
- Brian Lessiter played cricket for Cornwall and Sussex second eleven.
- Jon Roycroft director of sport at Oxford University
- Bob Gardner played for Leicestershire. Play for Lewes Priory CC for two seasons as opening batsman (his batting average in one year was 54; the next 61)
- Les Bampton a leg spin and googly bowler who captained the Club Cricket Conference for several years. Took 300 wickets twice in a season

==== Sussex CCC players ====
Since 1938 at least six Lewes Priory players have played for Sussex, including:

- Doug Smith, fast bowler who played for Sussex before the second world war
- D. J. Smith
- P. G. Laker
- Ralph Cowen:
- Carl Hopkinson, current fielding coach at Sussex CCC
- Paul Phillipson

==== England players ====
- Rosalie Birch

==== Overseas players and members ====
- K.G.N. (Kyron) Lynch (Trinidad & Tobago)
- Amit Jaggernauth (Trinidad & Tobago offspinner)
- Rayad Emrit (Trinidad & Tobago off)
- Suren Perera (Sri Lanka and Ragama cricket club)
- Kashif Ibrahim
- Indrajit Coomaraswamy
- John Boyd played top grade cricket for Waverley cricket club in Sydney, Australia

== Gallery ==
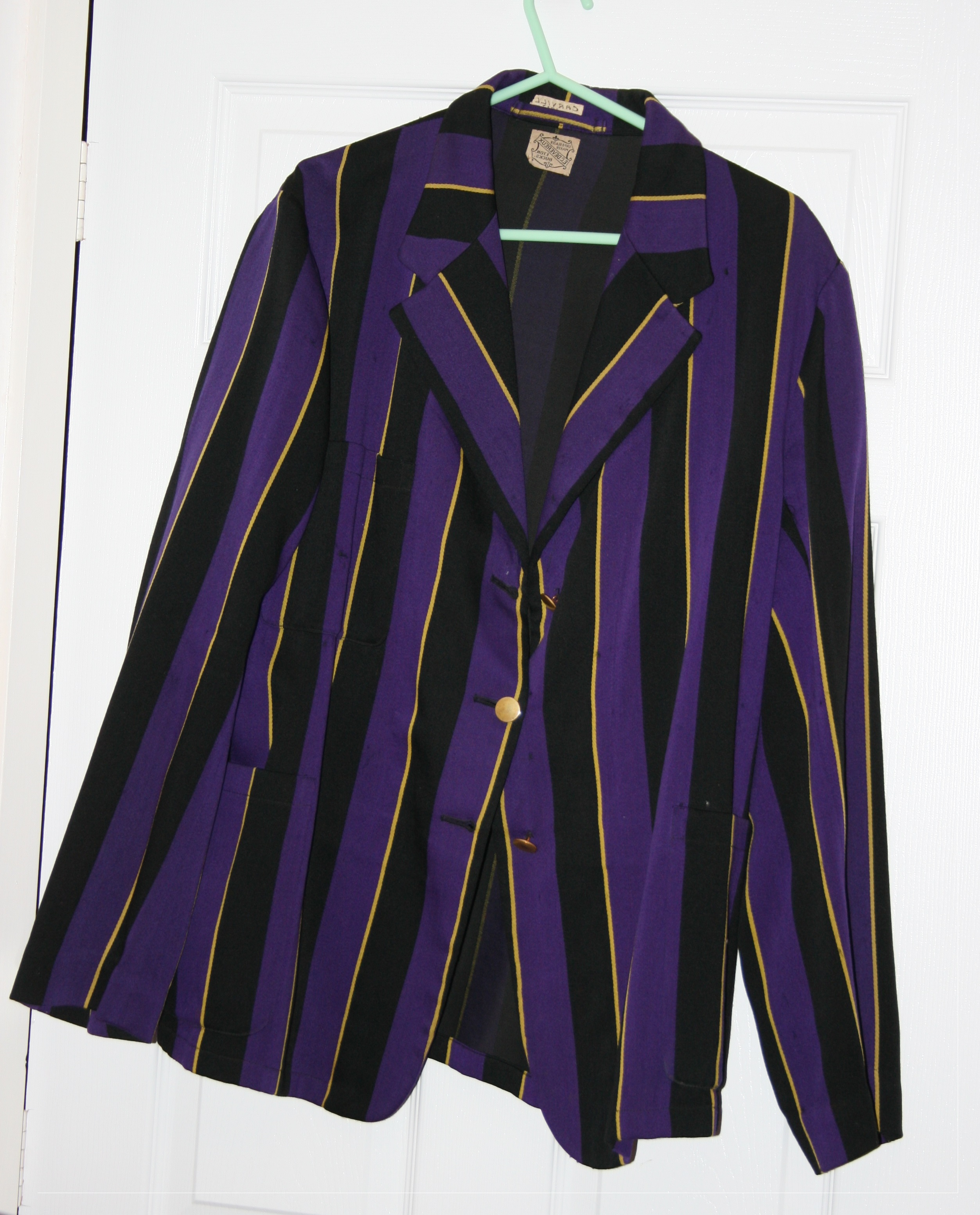
Traditional cricket club blazer from Lewes Priory cricket club, Sussex, England (1937). Originally the property of Dick Carvill, accountant at Harvey's brewery, Lewes. Then belonged to Rex Hudson, former club vice captain and local auctioneer/estate agent (who sold Shelley's hotel on a number of occasions)

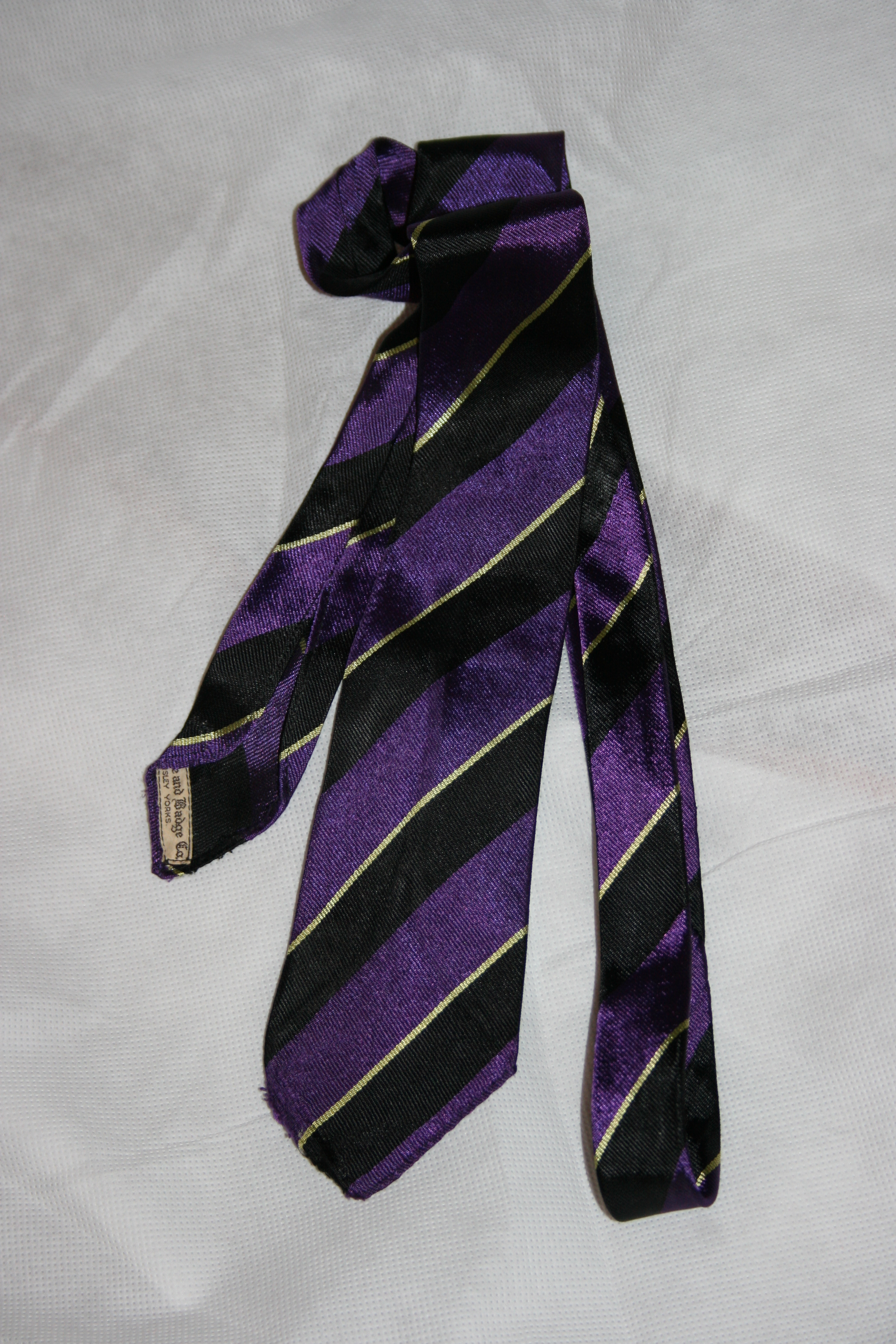
Traditional cricket club tie from 1960s

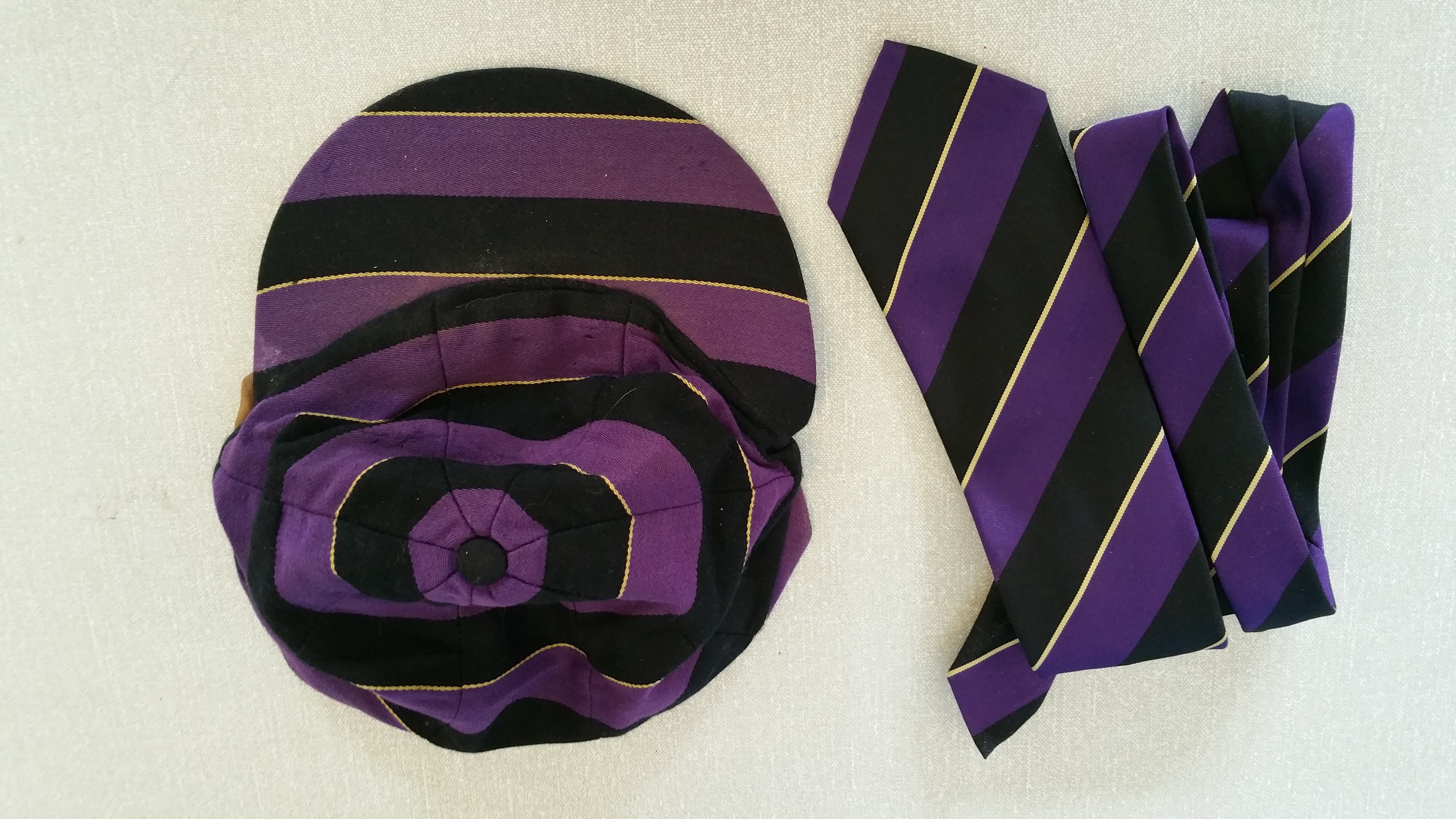
Lewes Priory Cricket Club (Sussex, England) cap and tie. Cap is pre-1939 and the tie more recent, i.e. cap shows original colours

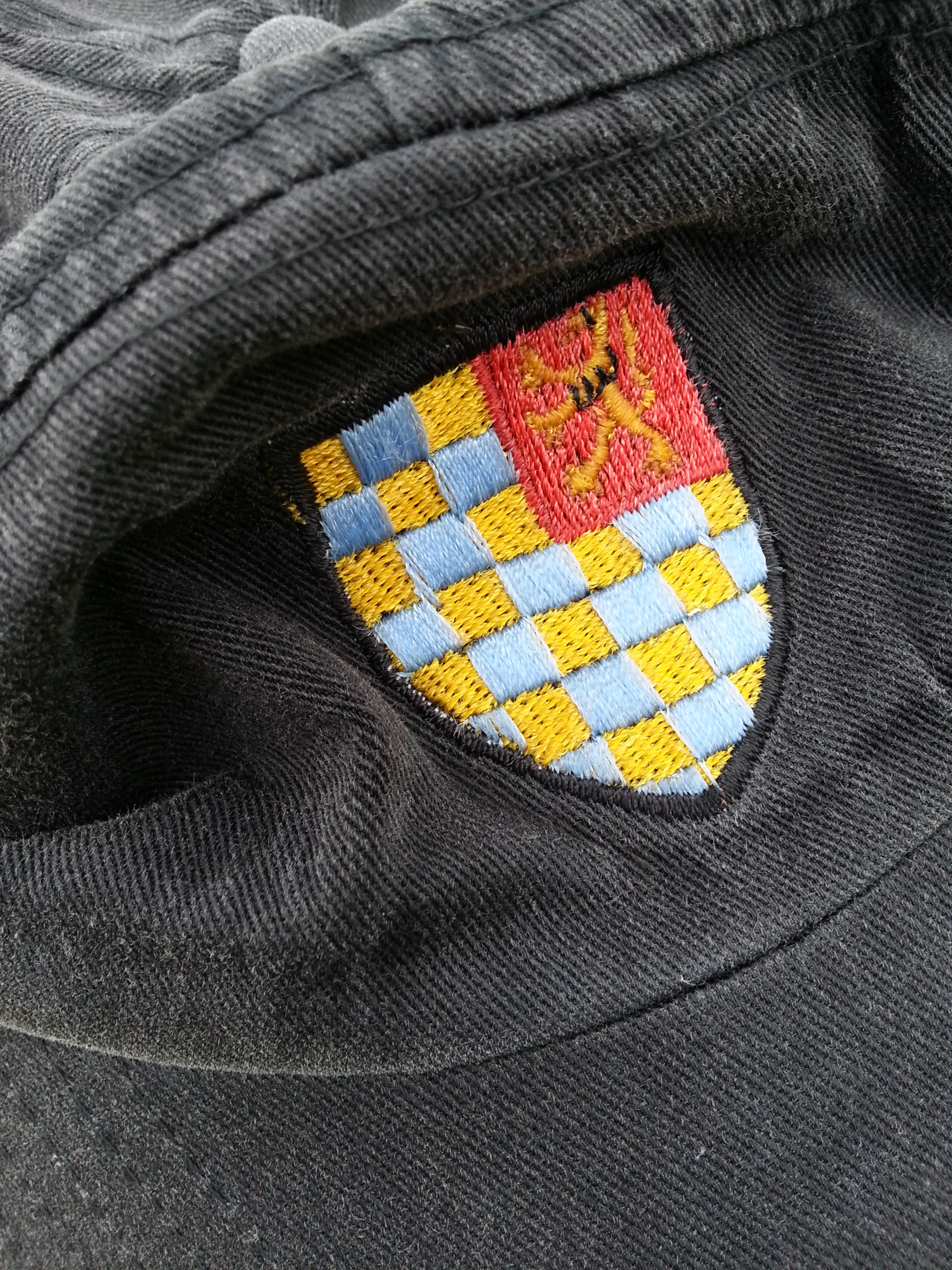
Lewes Priory Cricket Club cap is currently black with the town's shield. In the 1980s this style started to replace the traditional cap which consisted of the club colours (see blazer) in the form of hoops.

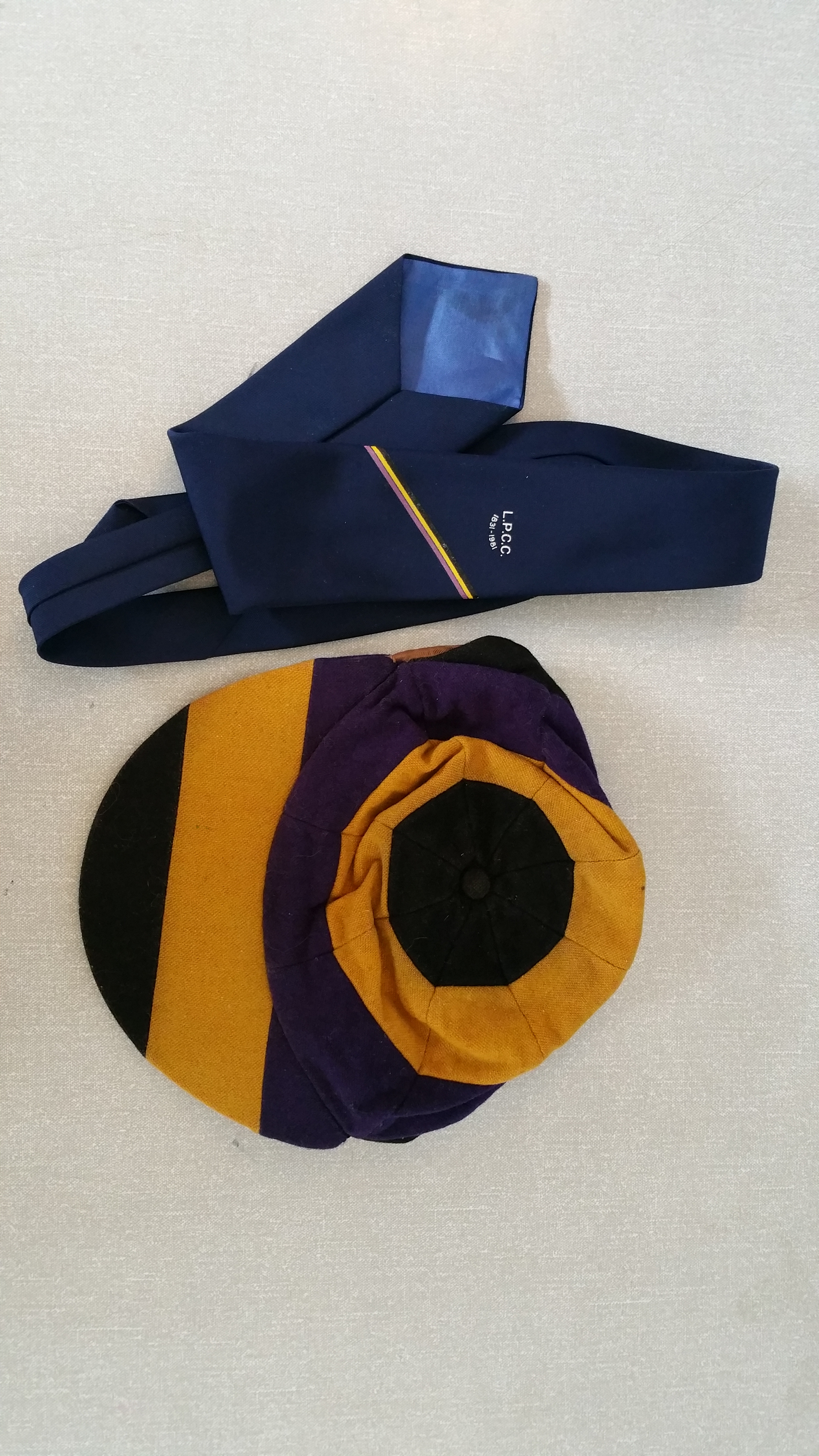
Lewes Priory Cricket Club 150th anniversary tie and cap (1981)

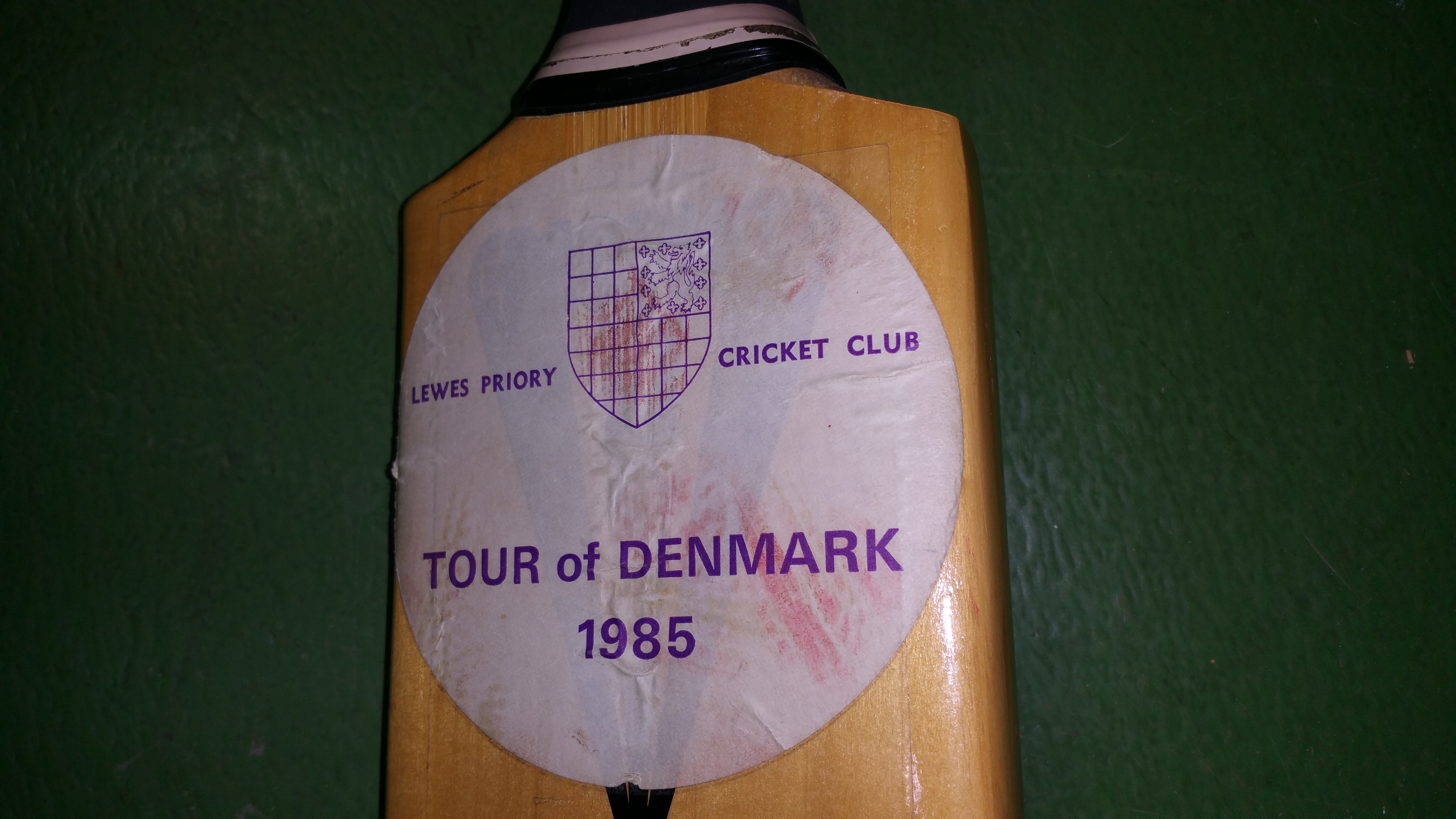
Lewes Priory Cricket Club sticker tour of Denmark 1985
