= Andreas Balzar =

Andreas Balzar, nicknamed Balzar of Flammersfeld (German: Balzar von Flammersfeld), full name Andreas Ludwig Balzar (c. 1769–1797) was a German robber. At the point of death, he confessed to killing 21 officers with his own hands.

== Early life ==
Andreas Balzar was born on 28 January 1769 in Höchstenbach in the German mountain region of Westerwald. As the eldest son, he should have followed his father into the priesthood. At first, he acceded to his father's will and attended the high school in Herborn. After being exposed there as the long-sought poacher of the prince's game estate, he was expelled from school, but before he was handed over to the court, he managed to escape from Herborn. He reached his parents' home in Flammersfeld, but his father turned him away.

== Russian military service ==
He is said to have moved to Russia, where his brother served in the Tsar's bodyguard. He found service as a soldier fulfilling and rose to the rank of captain in the bodyguard.

== Return home ==
It is unclear what prompted him to return to his homeland, the Westerwald. But when he did, he quickly fell in with a band of marauding robbers; he subsequently formed his own gang of poachers and made himself its leader.

When a French officer indecently assaulted Balzar's bride as his troops marched through Flammersfeld, Balzar asked his hunters to help him hunt the French. Farmers and young boys also followed his call, but his appeal for a general uprising in the Westerwald was unsuccessful. At times, Balzar fought with his Freischärlers on the side of the Imperials (Kaiserliche), as the Austrian troops were called, but he often carried out his own ventures with his men. Under the name "Le capitaine noir" ("The Black Captain") he was searched for by the French; several times he was able to escape from their captivity. In summer 1797, however, he was betrayed into the hands of a French search party, who brought him to Westerburg, where he was sentenced to death by shooting at a court martial. Although he was a poacher in the eyes of the French, the fact that he was not, like robber leader Schinderhannes, led to the scaffold or hanged may have had something to do with his Russian officer rank. However, his death by shooting made him a hero in the Westerwald for decades. He was executed on 3 October 1797 in Westerburg.

Even today, Flammersfeld hosts performances of his fateful life; the Hessian author and archivist, Christian Spielmann, made him a character in a novel at the beginning of the 20th century as "Balzar of Flammersfeld".

== Literature ==
- Erwin Katzwinkel: Andreas Balzar. In: Lebensbilder aus dem Kreis Altenkirchen. Altenkirchen, 1979
- Erwin Katzwinkel: Andreas Balzar – Legende und Wirklichkeit. In: Heimat-Jahrbuch des Kreises Altenkirchen. Altenkirchen, 1975
- Christian Spielmann: Balzar von Flammersfeld. Roman vom Westerwalde, Leipzig 1906, later also worked by Fritz Vater into a local history play (Heimatspiel)
