= Mia Borders =

American singer-songwriter

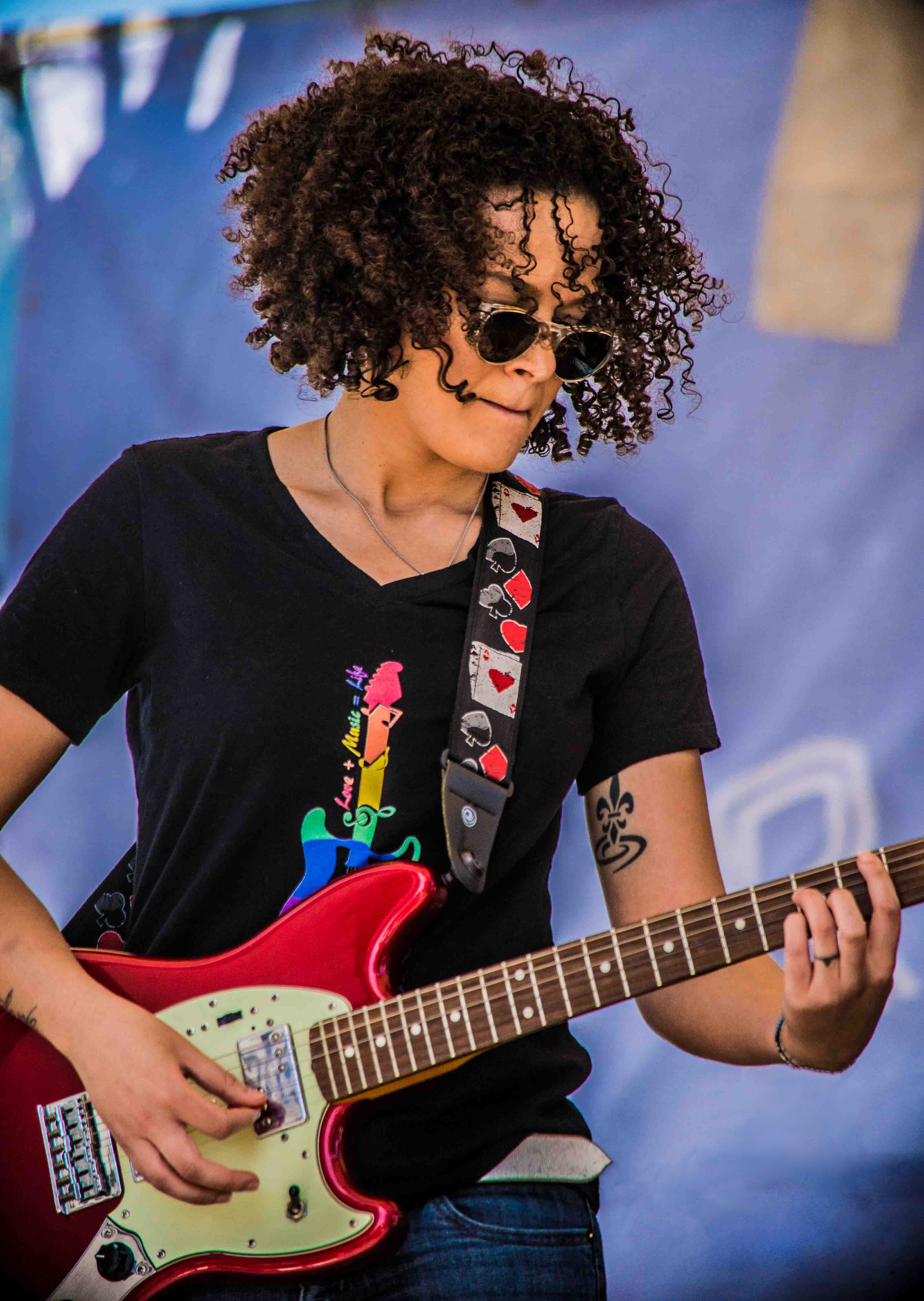

Background information
- Born: 1987 (age 38–39); New Orleans, United States
- Genres: soul, funk, rhythm and blues
- Occupation: singer-songwriter
- Instruments: vocals, rhythm guitar
- Years active: 2006–present
- Website: miaborders.com

Mia Borders (born 1987) is an American singer-songwriter from New Orleans, Louisiana, mixing soul, funk, rhythm and blues, and electronic music.

She has released seven albums, three singles, and three EPs - the latest being 2024's release, Firewalker.

== Life ==
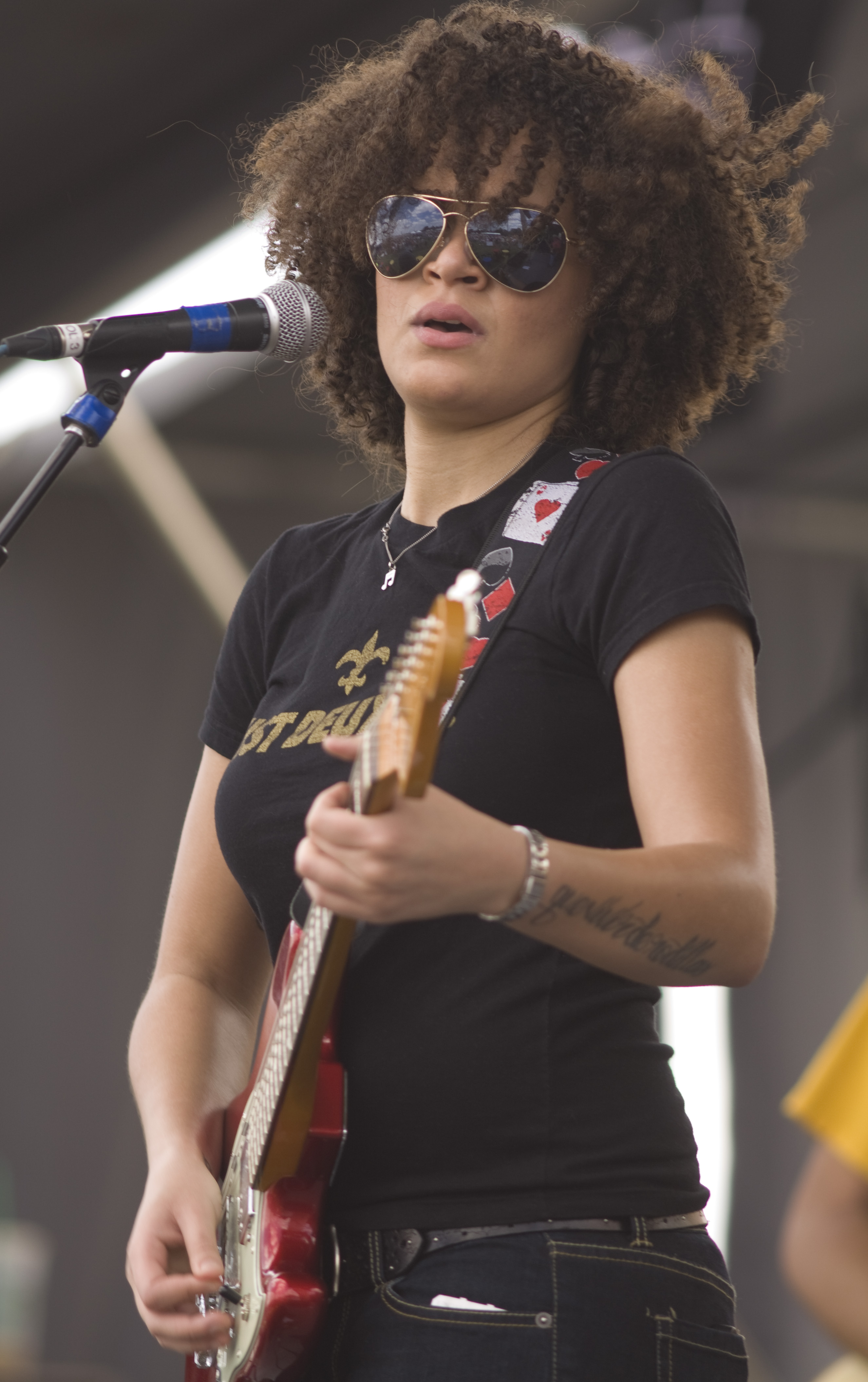
Borders in 2012

Born in New Orleans, Borders was given her first acoustic guitar at the age of ten, while her first electric guitar came as a later present from her grandmother. One of her grandfathers was a trumpet-player. After attending Taft School in Connecticut, she was planning to go on to a film school in Georgia, but in January 2006, after Hurricane Katrina, returned home to New Orleans. She got her first work as a professional musician later in 2006 and enrolled at Loyola University the same year. In 2009 she released her first LP, Southern Fried Soul, and in 2010 graduated in English. After working briefly as a paralegal, she took the decision not to go to graduate school and instead to make her living by playing music.

Borders has cited Bill Withers and Etta James as being among her influences. Still based in her home city, she now does many tours, performing chiefly at clubs and festivals. The events and venues she plays include House of Blues in the French Quarter, the New Orleans Jazz & Heritage Festival, Tipitina's, the Essence Music Festival, the Santa Cruz Blues Fest, Nightfall at Chattanooga, Telluride Cajun Festival, Tab Benoit's Voice of the Wetlands, the Levitt Shell in Memphis, Tennessee, Wakarusa, the Long's Park Amphitheater in Lancaster, Pennsylvania, the Green Parrot in Key West, and the John F. Kennedy Center for the Performing Arts in Washington, D.C. Her overseas expeditions have taken her to the Bourbon Street Fest in São Paulo, Brazil.

At the New Orleans Jazz Fest of 2012 Borders appeared on the Gentilly Stage with a five-member band and teased the crowd: "Join me on this next song. I'm sure you sound like angels – angels that have been drinking in the hot sun! Let's do this!"

In 2013 she was interviewed for OffBeat by Brett Milano, who reported that her new album Quarter Life Crisis included a song beginning "You emotionally fucked me" and that the title had come from her therapist. Milano also noted that Borders had a saying of Che Guevara tattooed on her arm meaning "Better to die standing than to live on your knees; " however, the quotation is also attributed to Emiliano Zapata, Dolores Ibarruri, and Jean-Paul Sartre. Quarter-Life Crisis was co-produced by Borders and Anders Osborne.

Apart from a collection of guitars and keyboards, she also owns a full drum kit, which helps her with mixing her compositions. My Darling Love, released as a single in 2014, was written for her brother's wedding. In September 2016 Borders unveiled her fifth studio LP, Fever Dreams, with the supporting artists including Jesse Morrow, John Papa Gros, Takeshi Shimmura, and Rob Lee.

In March 2019, Borders released her latest EP, "Good Side of Bad," under her own label, Blaxican Records.

== Critical reception ==
In 2012 The Times-Picayune called Borders "studiously cool" and "lusciously sly and sultry". In 2014 it commented that "Her voice possesses a natural, appealing bite to its expressive contours" and that she was "simultaneously clean, sultry and a bit lascivious". USA Today has reported on "her blues/soul/funk repertoire" and her "deeply funky" version of Stevie Wonder's Living for the City. OffBeat has hailed her "great music and great intensity".

In his book When Not Performing, David Spielman gives two pages to Borders and suggests "she could be the next big thing". Writing in the Huffington Post online, Christina Oxenberg describes her voice as "an instrument of exquisite beauty" and strongly recommends hearing her live.

When reviewing her latest release in 2019, Brett Milano of Offbeat described Borders and her music as "well-steeped in classic soul."

== Discography ==
- the ep as MNSKP (Pound4Pound Productions EP, released January 2007)
- The Nashville Cuts as MNSKP (Pound4Pound Productions EP, released October 2008)
- Southern Fried Soul (Blaxican Records LP, released August 8, 2009)
- Magnolia Blue (Blaxican Records/Hypersoul Records LP, released June 3, 2010)
- Live at House of Blues New Orleans (Live Nation Studios)
- Southern Fried Soul - Special Edition (Blaxican Records LP, released April 2011)
- Wherever There Is (Blaxican Records LP, released April 18, 2012)
- Quarter-Life Crisis (Hypersoul Records LP, released April 25, 2013)
- Mama Told Me (Acoustic) (Blaxican Records single, released 2013)
- My Darling Love (Blaxican Records single, released July 8, 2014)
- Fever Dreams (Blaxican Records LP, released September 2, 2016)
- Find Another Lover (Remix) (Blaxican Records single, released September 2016)
- Good Side of Bad (Blaxican Records EP, released March 29, 2019)
