= Szpilman =

Szpilman is a surname and may refer to:

- Władysław Szpilman (1911–2000), Jewish Polish pianist and composer, the protagonist in The Pianist, 2002 historical drama film
- Andrzej Szpilman (born 1956), Jewish Polish dentist, composer, son of Władysław

== Other ==
- 9973 Szpilman, main belt asteroid, named after Władysław Szpilman
- Szpilman Award, German annual art prize

== See also ==
- Spielmann
- Spillman
