= Flammersfeld =

- Municipality
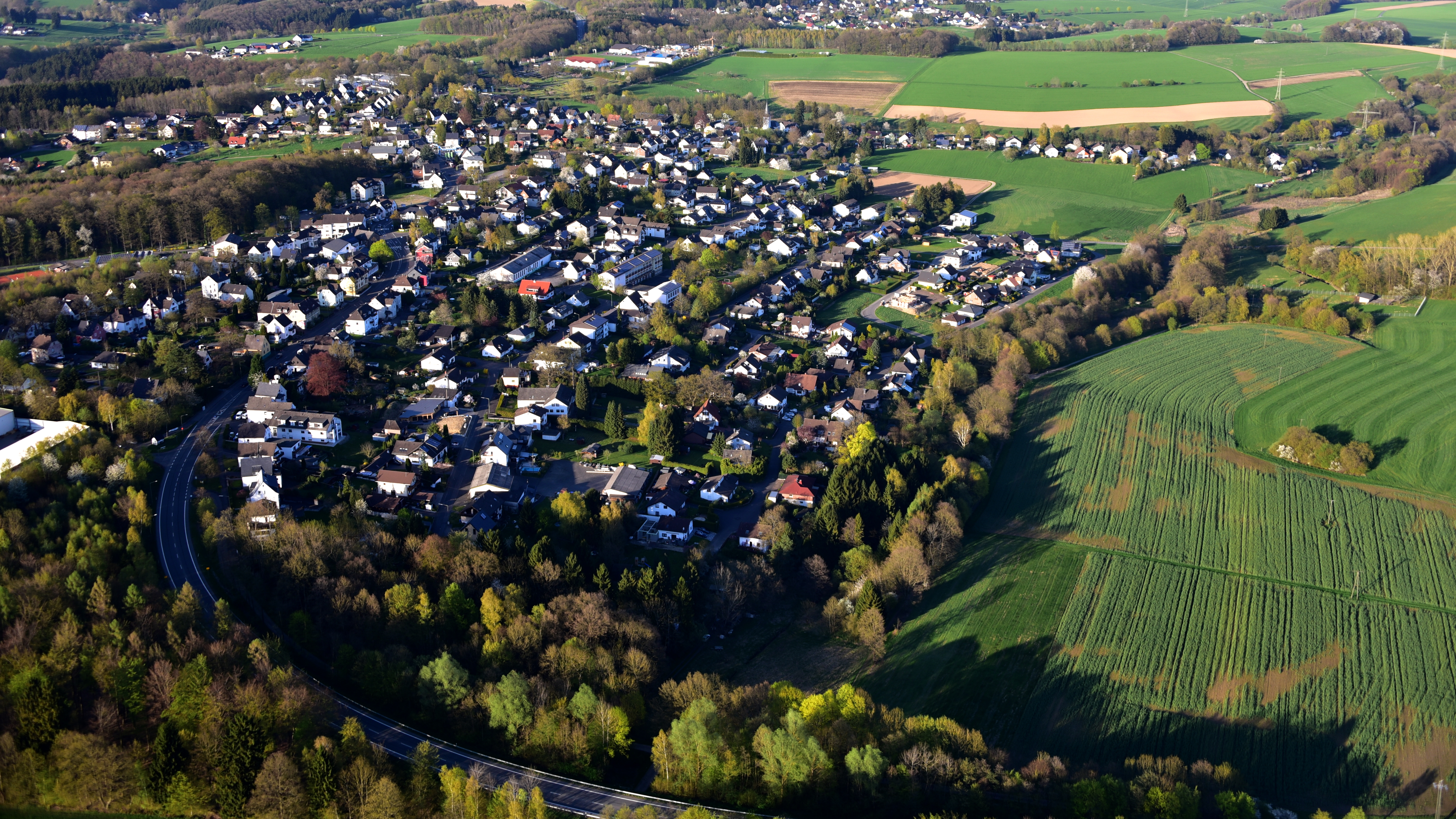
- Aerial view

- Coat of arms

- Location of Flammersfeld within Altenkirchen district
- Interactive map of Flammersfeld
- Location within Germany Location within Rhineland-Palatinate
- Coordinates: 50°38′52″N 7°31′35″E
- Country: Germany
- State: Rhineland-Palatinate
- District: Altenkirchen
- Municipal assoc.: Altenkirchen-Flammersfeld

Government
  - Mayor (2019–24): Manfred Berger

Area
  - Total: 4.06 km^{2} (1.57 sq mi)
- Elevation: 270 m (890 ft)

Population (2025-12-31)
  - Total: 1,415
  - Density: 349/km^{2} (903/sq mi)
- Time zone: UTC+01:00 (CET)
  - Summer (DST): UTC+02:00 (CEST)
- Postal codes: 57632
- Dialling codes: 02685
- Vehicle registration: AK
- Website: www.gemeinde-flammersfeld.de

Flammersfeld is a municipality in the district of Altenkirchen, in Rhineland-Palatinate, Germany. It is situated in the Westerwald, approx. 35 km north of Koblenz.

Flammersfeld was the seat of the former Verbandsgemeinde ("collective municipality") Flammersfeld.

== People from the village ==
- Andreas Balzar (known as Balzar of Flammersfeld, 1769–1797) poacher, robber and Freischärler who fought the French
- Emil Bettgenhäuser (1906–1982), politician (SPD), MdB, MdL Rhineland-Palatinate
- W. Gies (born 1945), fine art
- Emil Müller (1890–1967), politician (SPD), MdL Rhineland-Palatinate, Bürgermeister of Flammersfeld
- Friedrich Wilhelm Raiffeisen (1818-1888), mayor in 1848, early founder of credit unions and cooperatives

== Transport ==
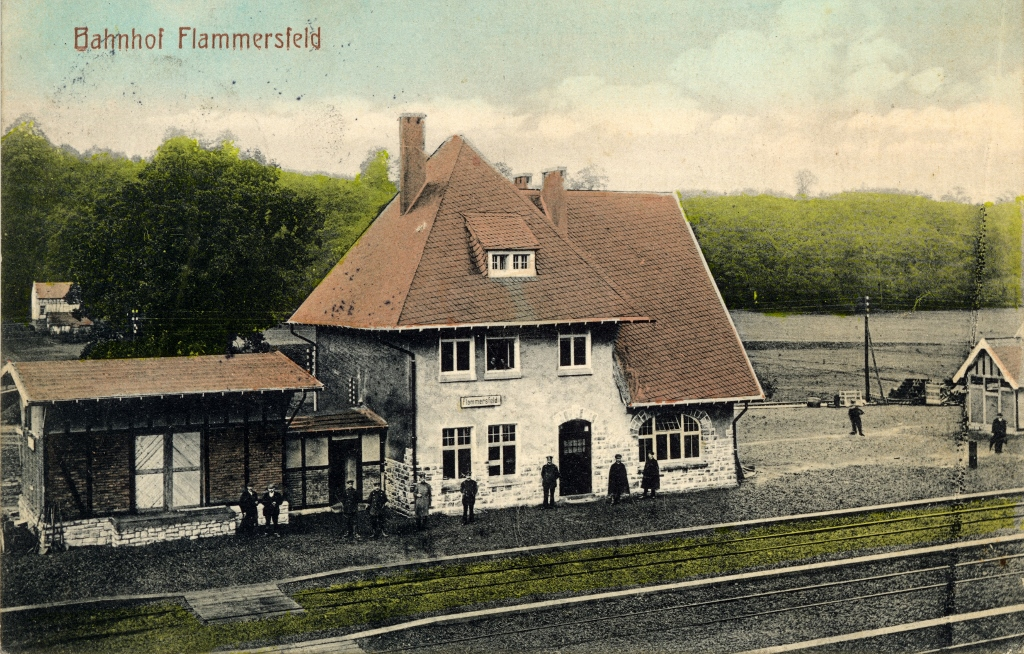
Former station in Flammersfeld

The former Flammersfeld station located in Seelbach (near Flammersfeld) on the Engers-Au railway line was the nearest station for public railway services. The section from Siershahn to Altenkirchen nowadays is only served by freight trains. It was also the terminus for the Linz–Flammersfeld railway (Kasbachtalbahn), now closed.

Flammersfeld itself is located in the zone number 904 of the transport association Verkehrsverbund Rhein-Mosel (VRM) and served by the local bus lines no. 102, 127 and 136.

The nearest accessability to the public rail transport nowadays is Altenkirchen (Westerw) station on the RB90 line from Limburg (Lahn) to Siegen Hbf.
