= Spillane =

Spillane is a family name derived from the Irish (Gaelic) surname Ó Spealáin or Mac Spealáin. It has also been anglicised as Spellman, Spillan, Spilane and Spallon. It may refer to:

== People ==
- Adrian Spillane (born 1994), Gaelic footballer from Ireland
- Daniel Spillane (born 1980), finalist on Australian Idol 2005
- Davy Spillane (born 1959), Irish musician, player of uilleann bagpipes
- Debbie Spillane (born 1955), Australian sports journalist and broadcaster
- James Spillane, American politician from New Hampshire
- John Spillane (born 1961), singer/songwriter from Cork, Ireland
- John David Spillane (1909–1985), Welsh physician
- Johnny Spillane (born 1980), American Nordic combined skier
- Killian Spillane, Gaelic footballer from Ireland
- Michael Spillane (footballer) (born 1989), Irish soccer player
- Mickey Spillane (1918–2006), American author of crime novels
- Mickey Spillane (gangster) (1934–1977), Irish-American mobster from New York
- Nicole Spillane (born 1988), French and Irish applied mathematician
- Pat Spillane (born 1955), Gaelic footballer from Ireland
- Robert Spillane (born 1995), American football player
- Scott Spillane, American musician
- Tom Spillane (born 1962), Gaelic footballer from Ireland

== Other ==
- Spillane (album), an album by John Zorn dedicated to writer Mickey Spillane
