= Höchstenbach =

- Municipality
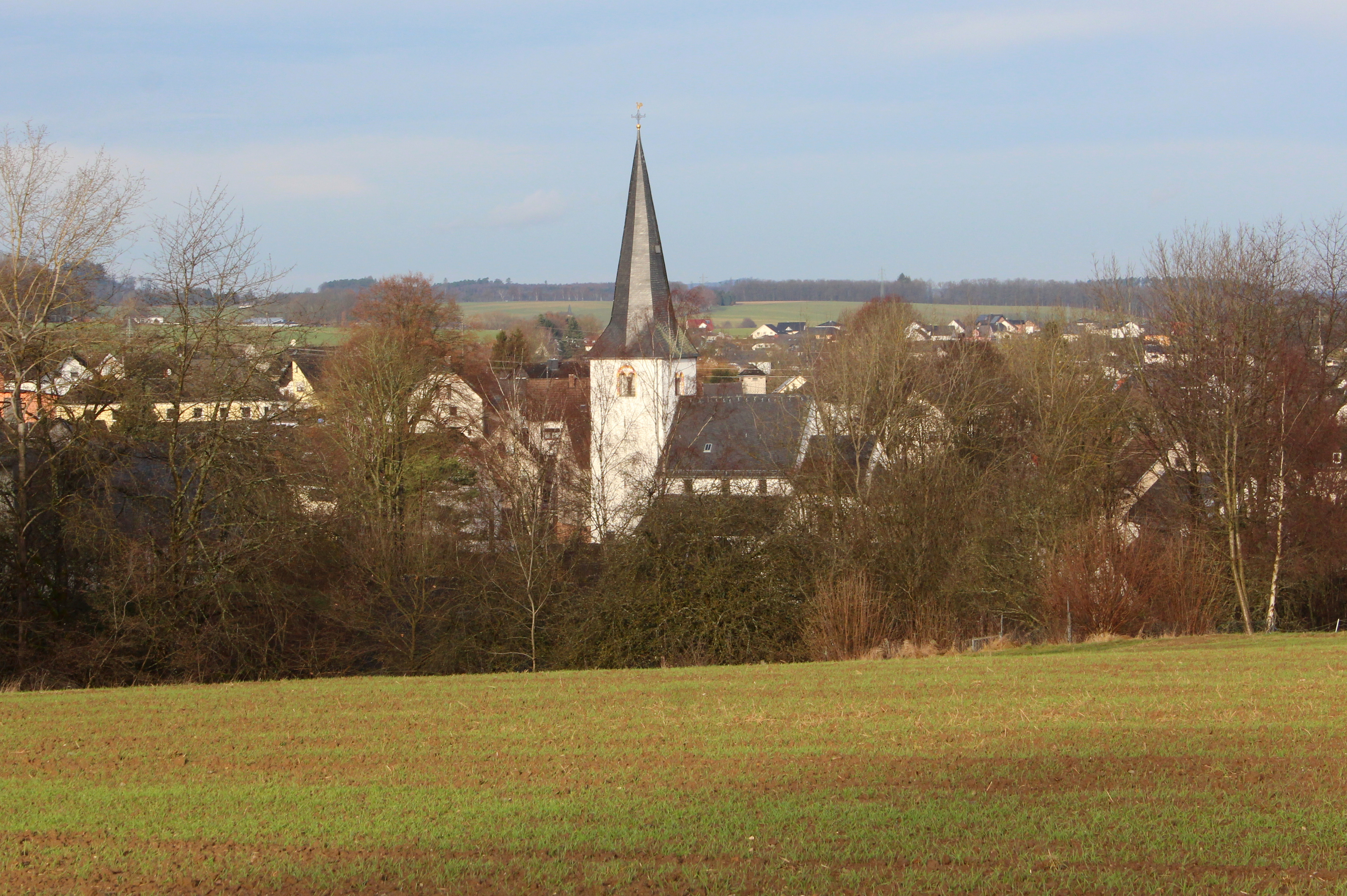

- Coat of arms

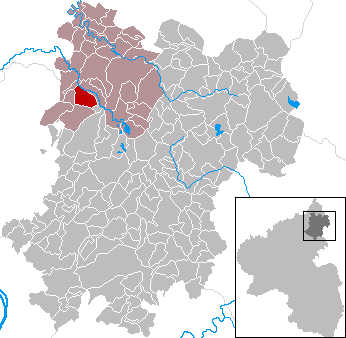
- Location of Höchstenbach within Westerwaldkreis district
- Interactive map of Höchstenbach
- Location within Germany Location within Rhineland-Palatinate
- Coordinates: 50°38′01″N 7°44′41″E
- Country: Germany
- State: Rhineland-Palatinate
- District: Westerwaldkreis
- Municipal assoc.: Hachenburg

Government
  - Mayor (2019–24): Anke Fuchs

Area
  - Total: 5.67 km^{2} (2.19 sq mi)
- Elevation: 310 m (1,020 ft)

Population (2025-12-31)
  - Total: 724
  - Density: 128/km^{2} (331/sq mi)
- Time zone: UTC+01:00 (CET)
  - Summer (DST): UTC+02:00 (CEST)
- Postal codes: 57629
- Dialling codes: 02680
- Vehicle registration: WW
- Website: www.hachenburg-vg.de

Höchstenbach is an Ortsgemeinde – a community belonging to a Verbandsgemeinde – in the Westerwaldkreis in Rhineland-Palatinate, Germany. The community belongs to the Verbandsgemeinde of Hachenburg, a kind of collective municipality. Its seat is in the like-named town.

== Geography ==
The community lies in the Westerwald between Limburg and Siegen in the Wied Valley. Through the community flows the river Wied.

== History ==
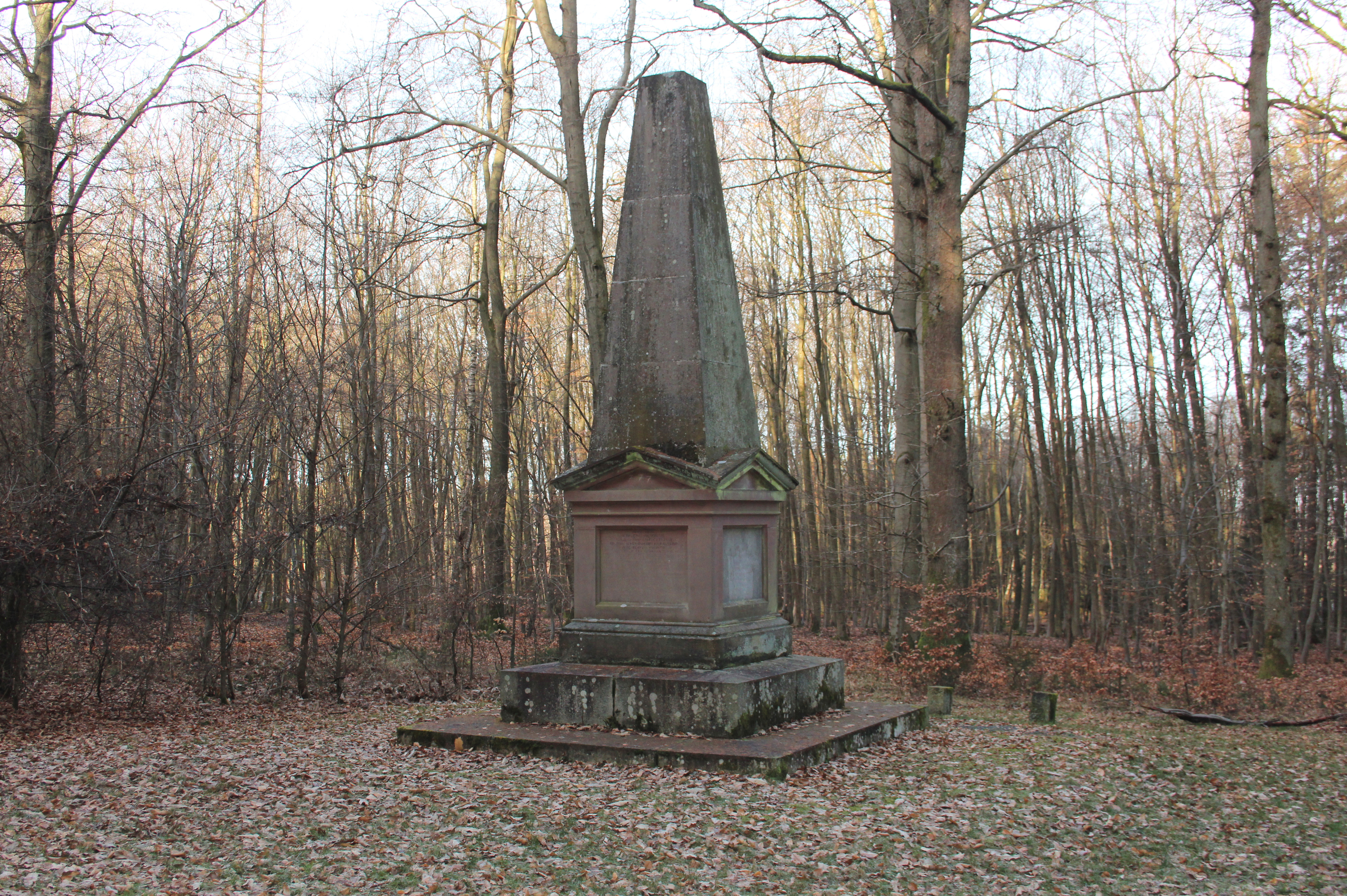
Marceau memorial Höchstenbach

On 27 May 1269, Höchstenbach had its first documentary mention.

== Politics ==
The municipal council is made up of 11 council members, including the extraofficial mayor (Bürgermeister), who were elected in a majority vote in a municipal election on 13 June 2004.

== Culture and sightseeing ==
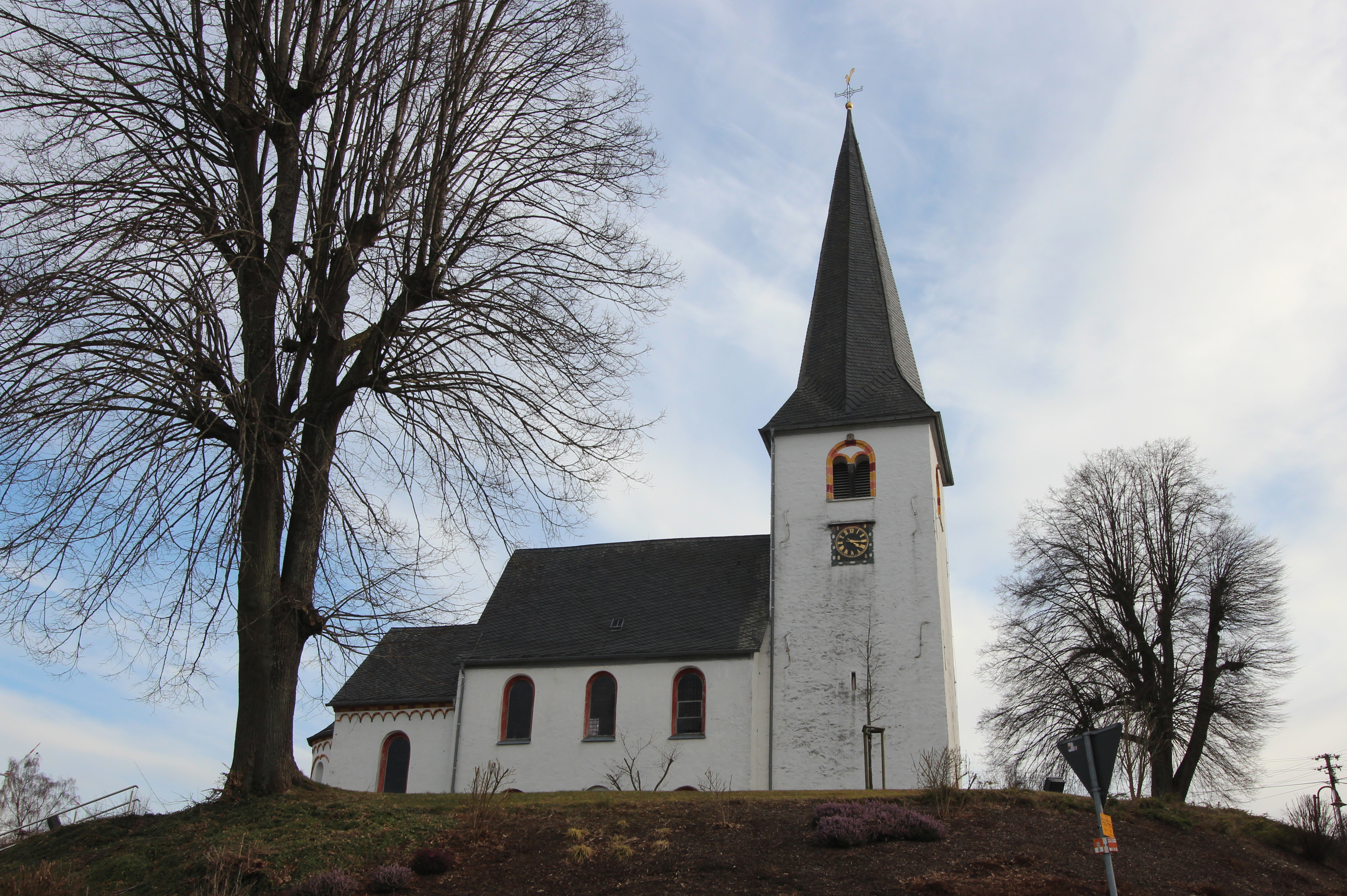
Lutheran church Höchstenbach

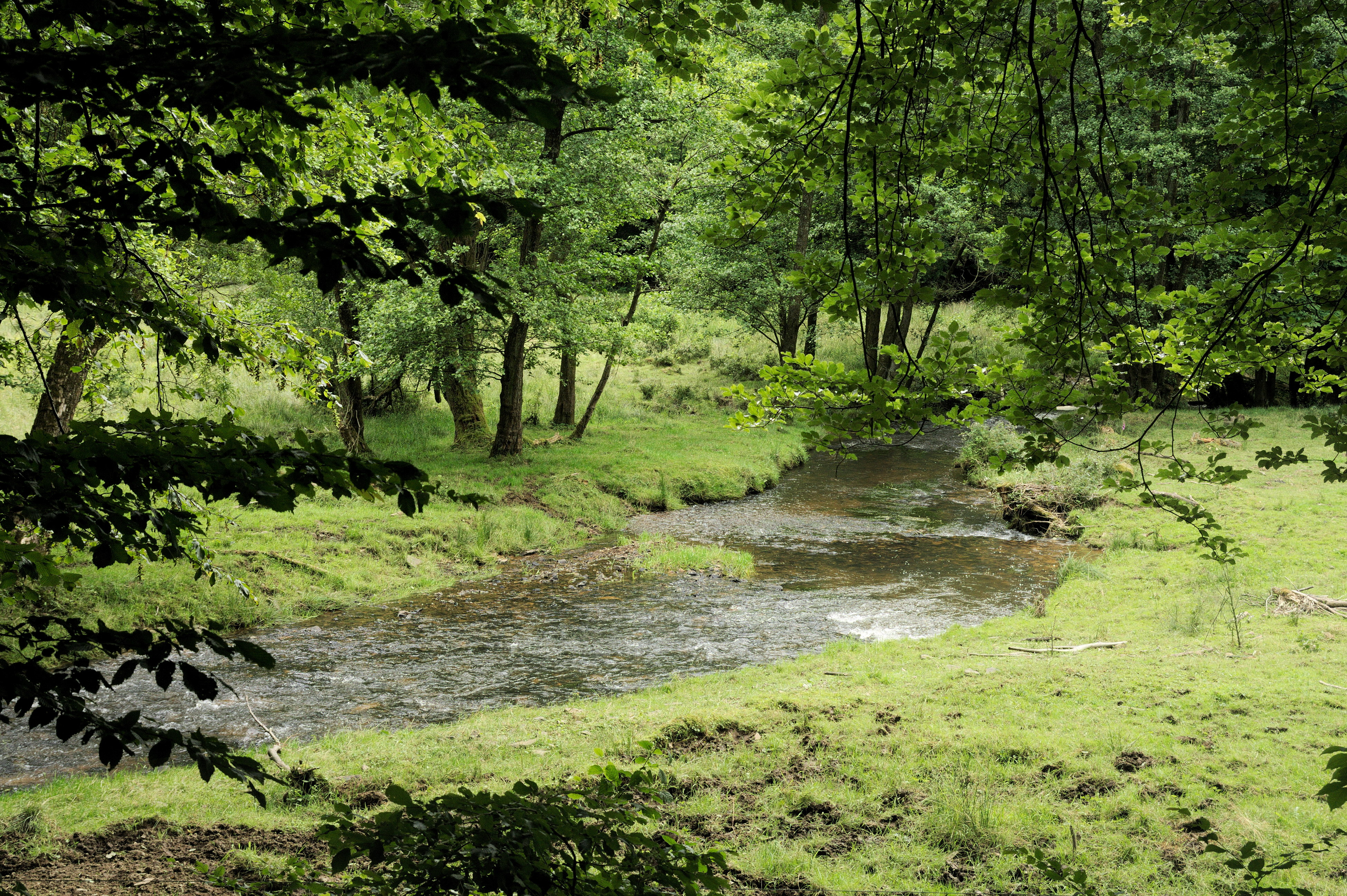
Protected area upper Wied valley in Höchstenbach

Worth seeing is the village church built in the early 13th century in Romanesque transition style. Within the church are found valuable Early Gothic frescoes.

== Economy and infrastructure ==
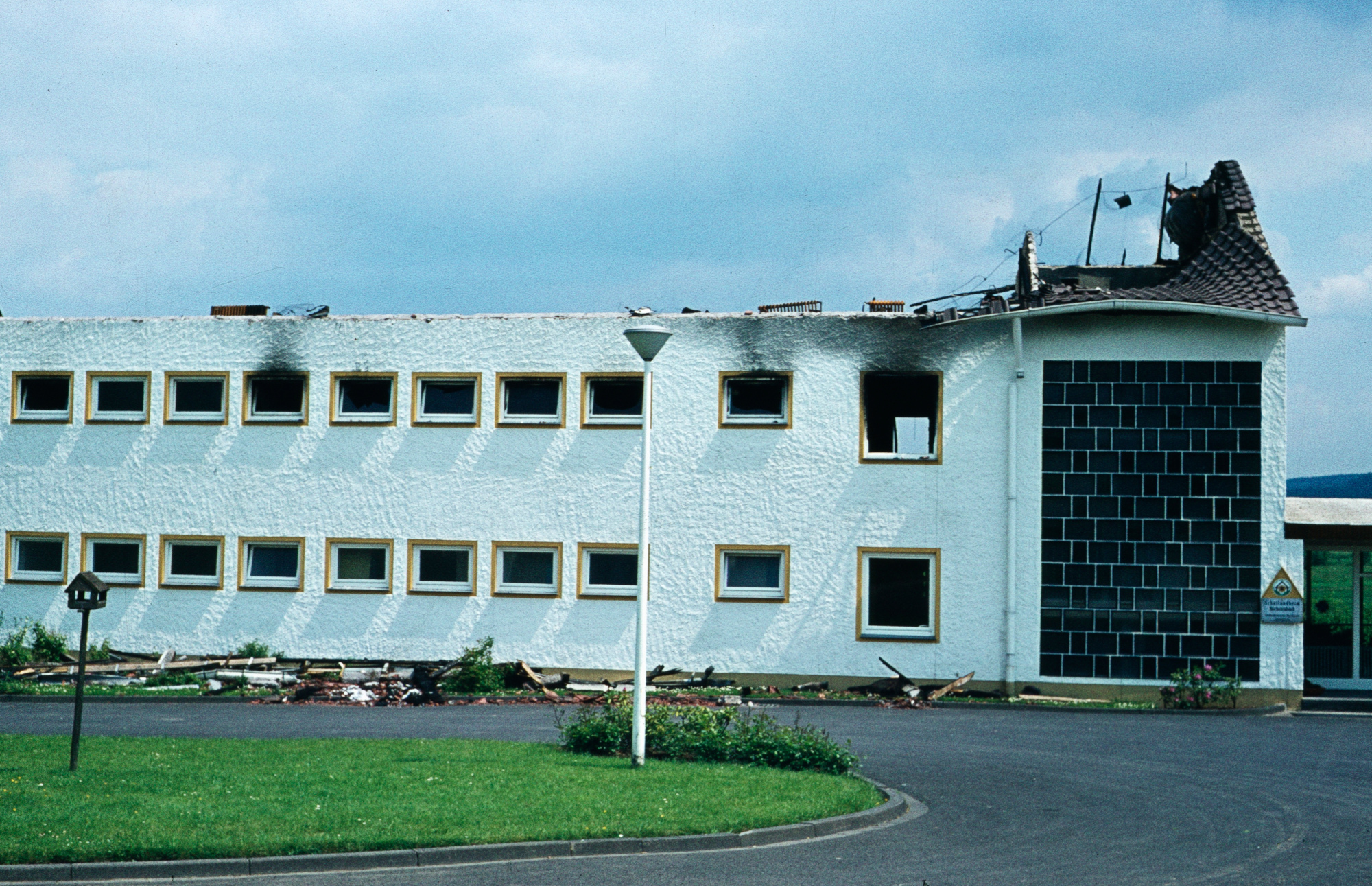
Youth hostel Höchstenbach

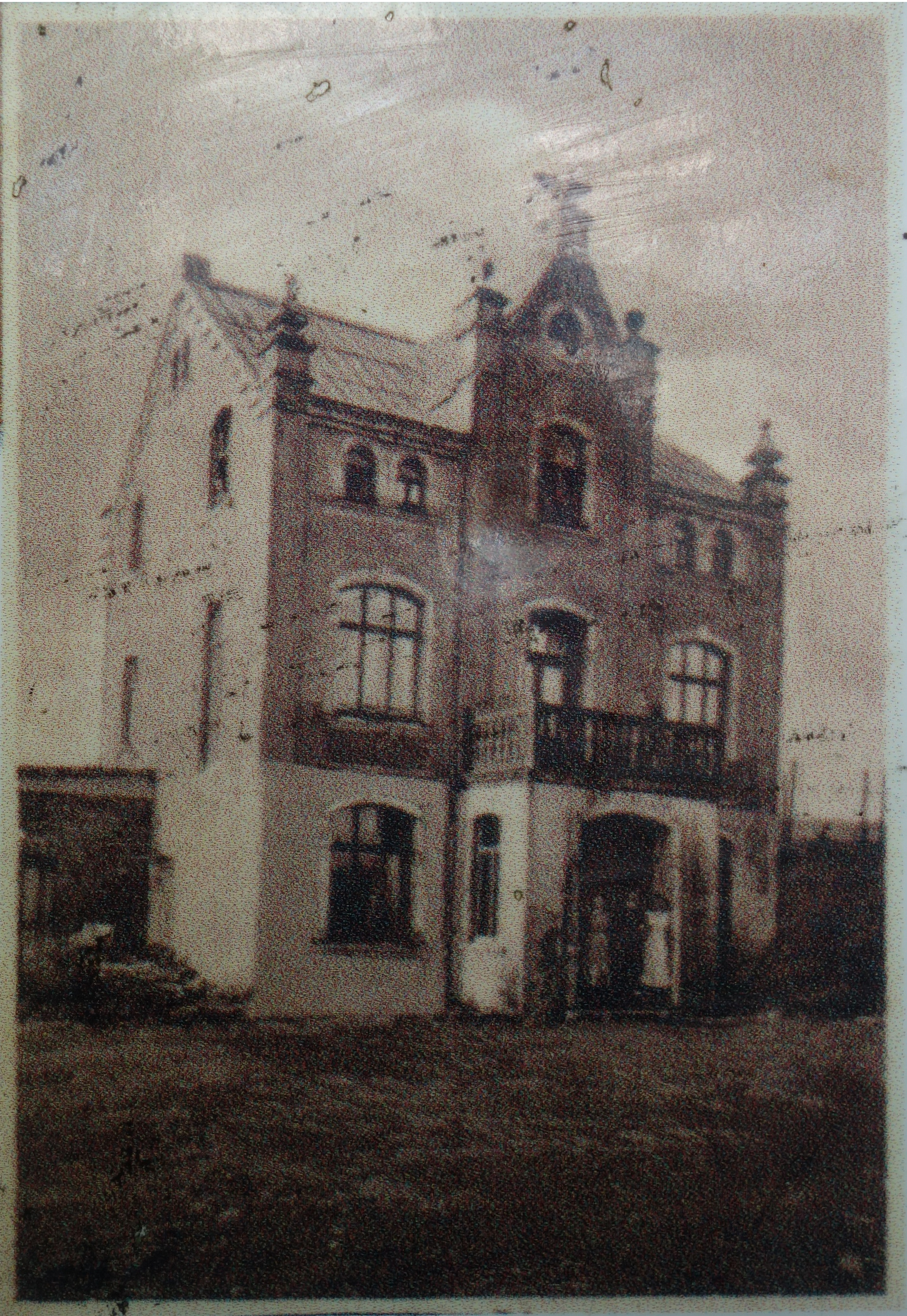
Former Höchstenbach train station at Selters - Hachenburg narrow gauge railway

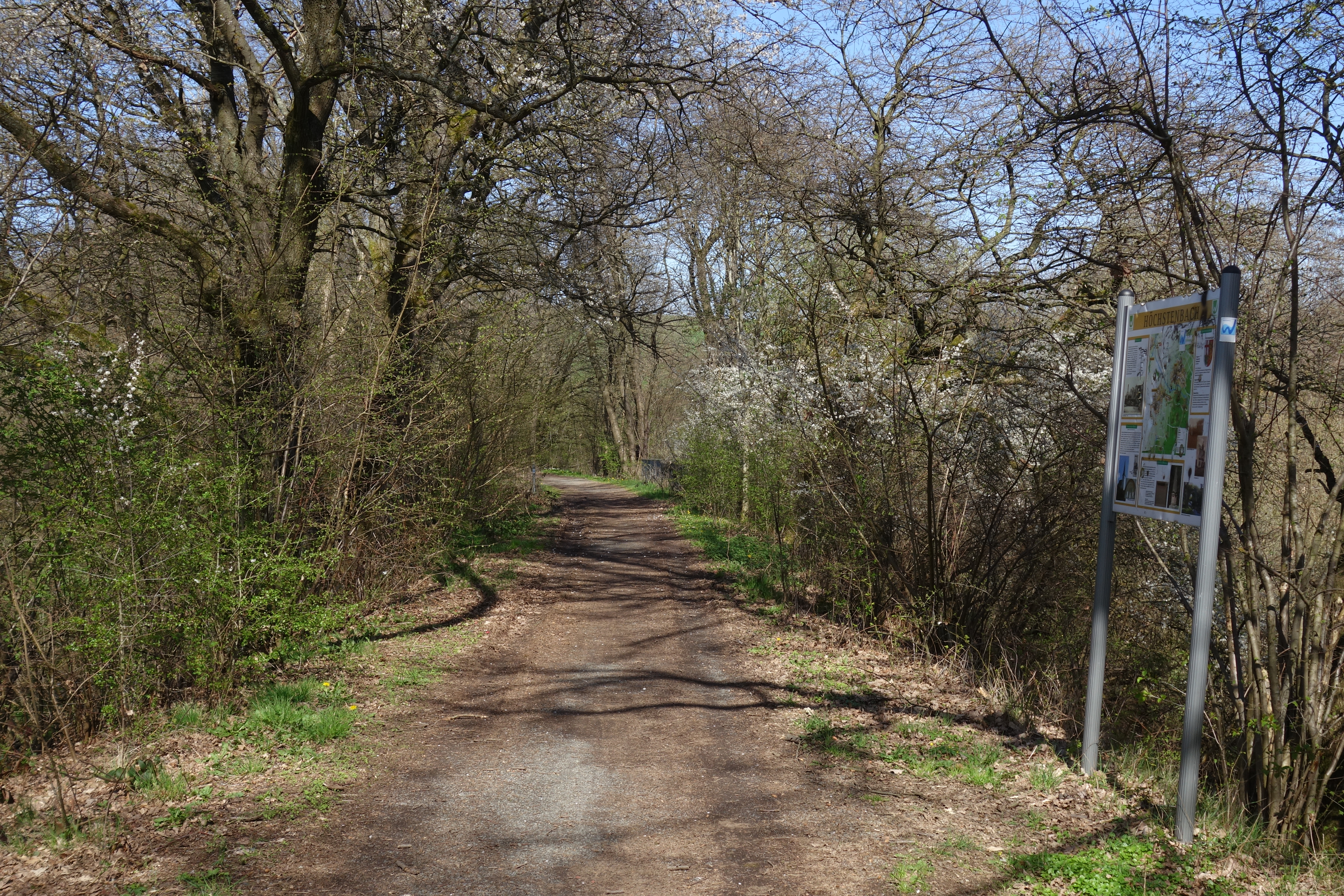
The former Selters-Hachenburg railway near Höchstenbach, nowadays a pedestrian- and cycling path

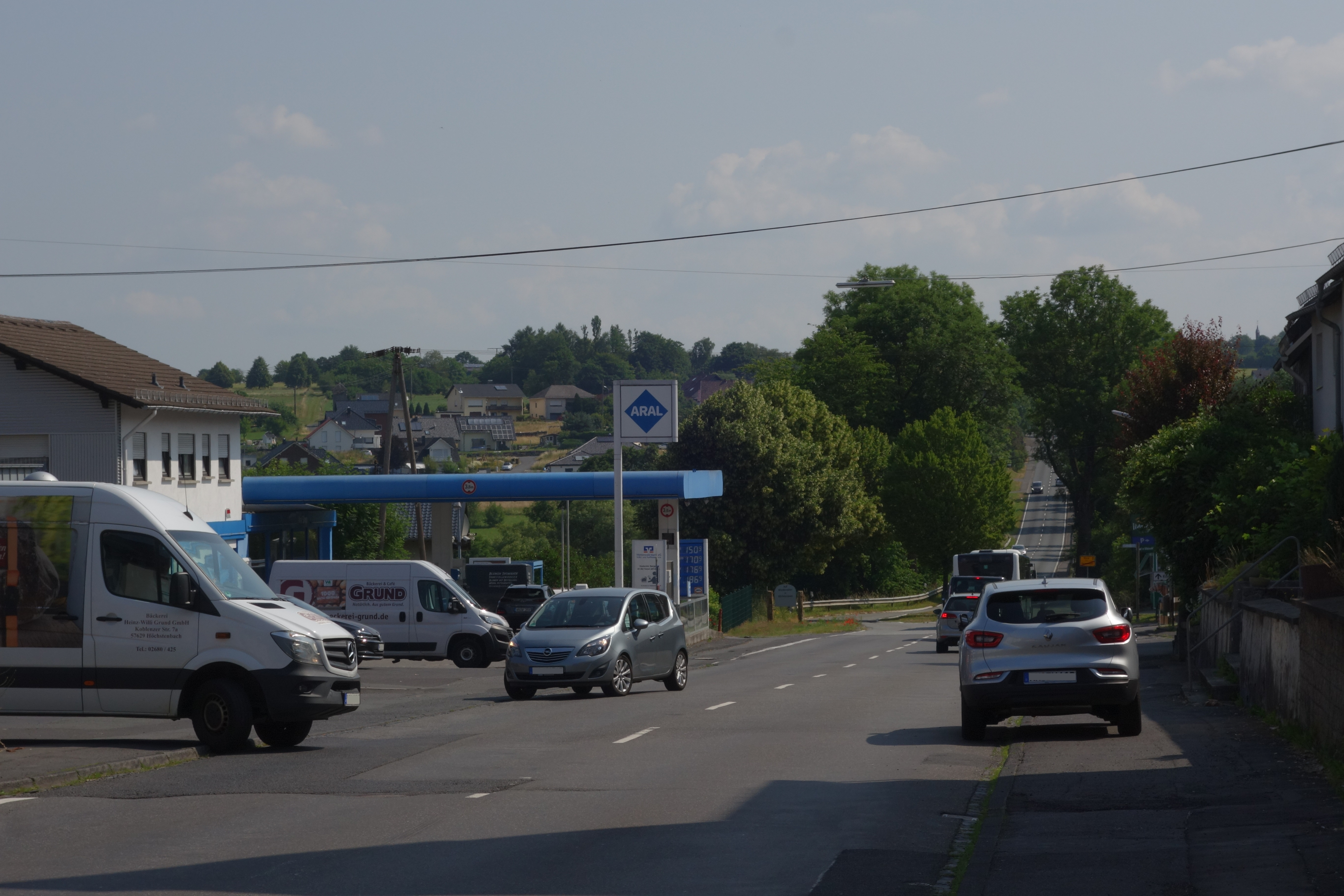
Bundesstraße 413 at the eastern end of the village, direction Wied

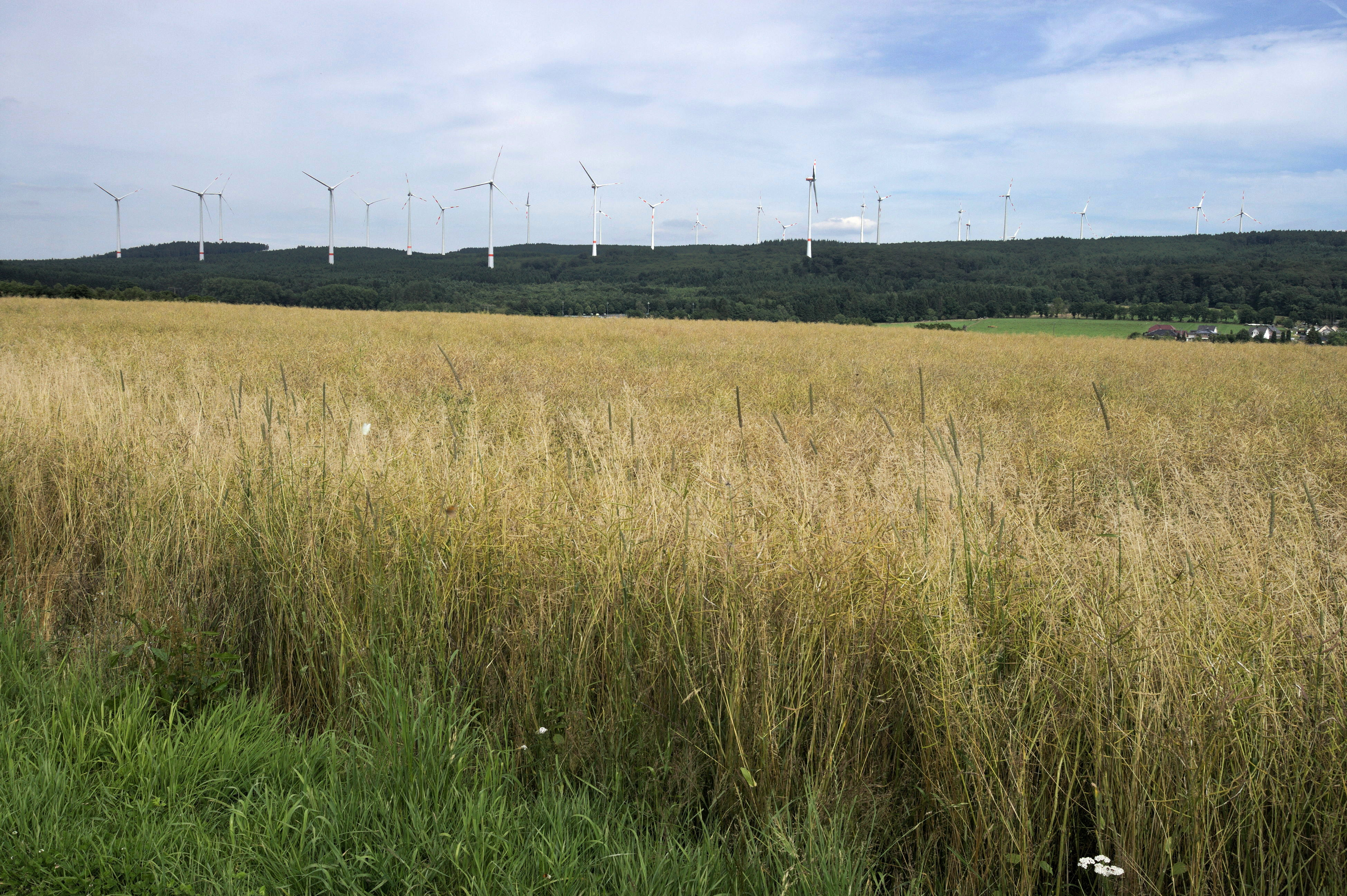
Wind farm Hartenfelser Kopf

The local bus lines 255, 415, 417, 420 and 439 serve Höchstenbach, the village is located in the area of the public transport association Verkehrsverbund Rhein-Mosel (VRM), zone number 449.

The community lies at the crossroads of Bundesstraßen 8, leading from Limburg an der Lahn to Siegburg, and 413 from Bendorf (near Koblenz) to Hachenburg. The nearest Autobahn interchanges are in Dierdorf and Mogendorf on the A 3 (Cologne–Frankfurt), some 20 km away.

Höchstenbach used to have a stop at the Selters-Hachenburg narrow gauge railway, but the line has been closed and the tracks deconstructed.

The village also is located at Westerwaldsteig, a long distance walking path from Herborn via Rennerod, Westerburg, Bad Marienberg and Hachenburg to Bad Hönningen.

The nearest InterCityExpress stop is the railway station at Montabaur on the Cologne-Frankfurt high-speed rail line.

For electricity production a Wind farm is located on Hartenfelser Kopf in the area of Höchstenbach and Mündersbach.

== Notable people ==
- Andreas Balzar (known as Balzar of Flammersfeld, 1769–1797) poacher, robber and Freischärler who fought the French
