= Spillmann =

Spillmann is a surname. Notable people with the surname include:

- Hans Rudolf Spillmann (born 1932), Swiss sports shooter and Olympic medalist
- Hans Spillmann (born 1969), Dutch footballer
- Joseph Spillmann (1842–1905), Swiss Jesuit priest and children's author
- Rodolphe Spillmann (1895–1981), Swiss fencer and Olympics competitor

== See also ==
- Spillman (disambiguation)
- Spilman (disambiguation)
