= The Dripping Pan =

Football stadium in Lewes, England

Coordinates: 50°52′8″N 0°0′44″E

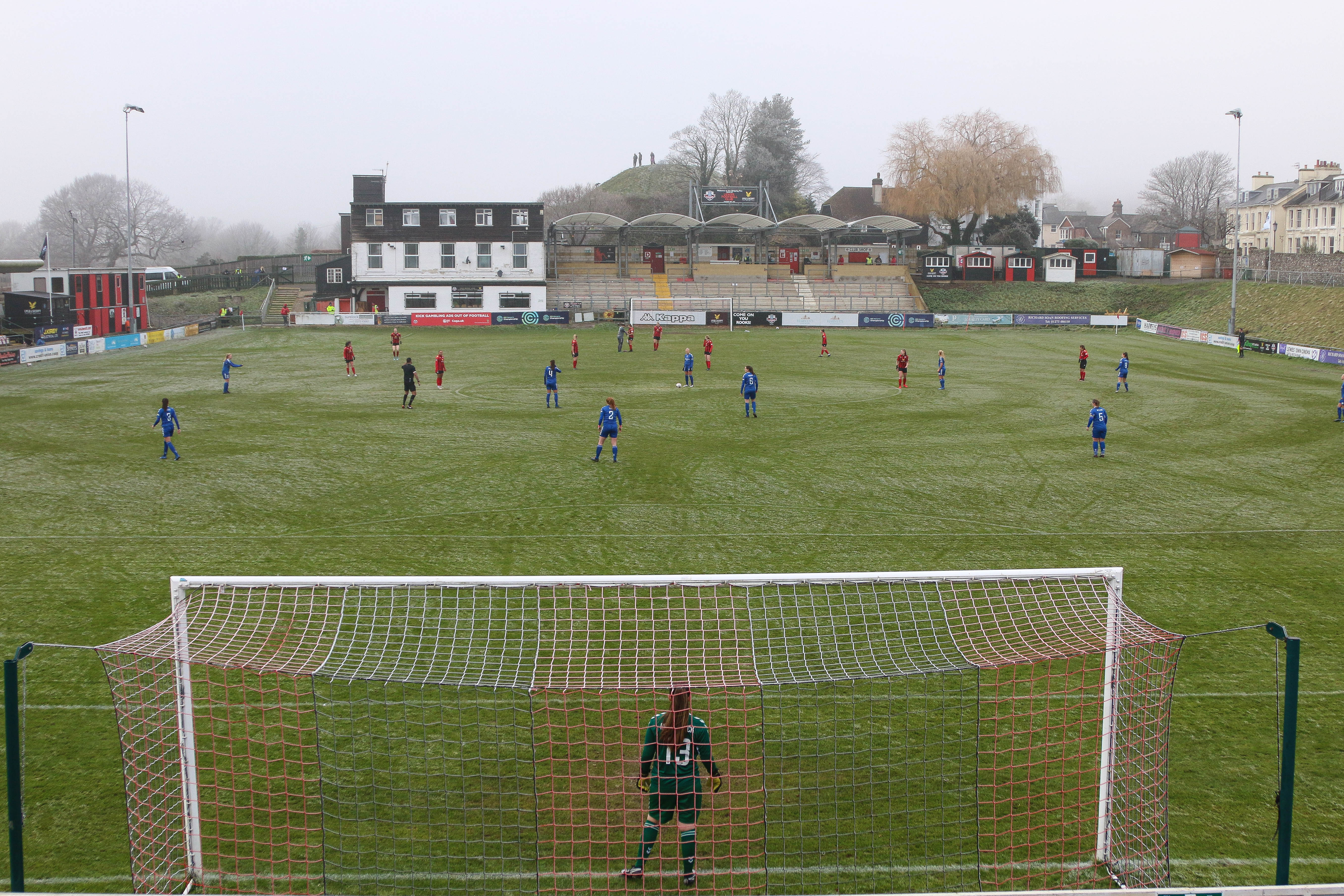
- Interactive map of The Dripping Pan
- Full name: The Dripping Pan
- Location: Mountfield Road, Lewes, East Sussex
- Capacity: 3,000 (600 seated)
- Field size: 110 x 72 yards

Construction
- Opened: 1885

Tenants
- Lewes F.C., Lewes L.F.C.

The Dripping Pan is a football stadium in Lewes, England. It has been home to Lewes F.C. since their foundation in 1885. It had previously been used by Lewes Priory Cricket Club, though the ground itself had been used by the people of Lewes as an area for recreation, including athletics, as far back as written records exist.

== Early history ==
The original purpose of the site is unclear, although local legend suggests that it was part of a salt making industry run by monks from the adjacent Cluniac Lewes Priory, the ruins of which can still be seen from the ground. The spoil from the excavation forms the Mount behind the Clubhouse, and both structures appear in the very earliest maps of Lewes in 1745.

Indeed, the ground may merely be the excavation pit for the Mount itself, which has been suggested as the original 'temporary' motte and bailey fortress constructed by William the Conqueror's close ally, William de Warenne, before he developed Lewes Castle on higher ground. An archaeological survey during construction of the new terrace failed to reveal any further insights into either the purpose or the age of the ground itself.

The earliest known use for cricket was 2nd Duke of Richmond's XI v Sir William Gage's XI in August 1730. It is not clear if the game was started as an announcement stated that "it was put off on account of Waymark, the Duke's man, being ill". Thomas Waymark was the outstanding player of the time. Two earlier matches are known to have taken place in Lewes but the specific location in each case was not recorded. The first was towards the end of the 1728 season and was a proposed match between the 2nd Duke of Richmond's XI and Sir William Gage's XI. The second was in September 1729 when a combined Sussex, Surrey and Hampshire played against Kent.

Lewes F.C. have played at the Dripping Pan every year since 1885, apart from a couple of seasons immediately prior to the First World War when the club played at the adjoining Convent Field.

== Recent history ==
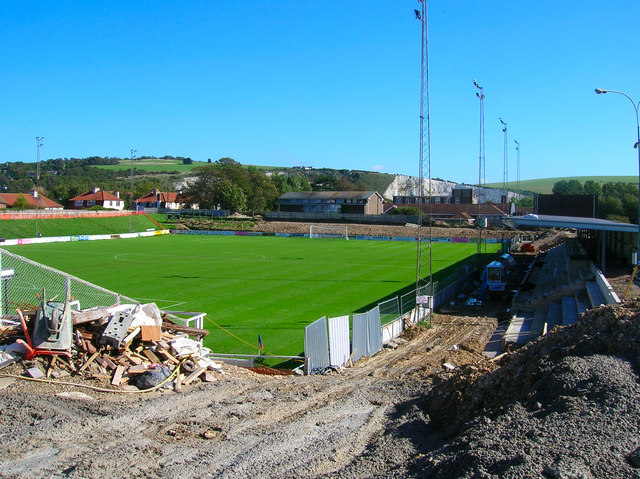
Redevelopment work under way at the Dripping Pan

The Dripping Pan has seen major redevelopment over recent years in order for it to achieve the necessary ground grading to allow it to be used as a football venue in the Conference South and the Conference National. Developing the ground has had its obstacles as the perimeter walls of the Dripping Pan are listed structures.

In April 2008, the ground was awarded a 'B' grade, allowing it to be used in the Conference National. The ground has since been updated further to ensure it was awarded the required 'A' grade by April 2009.

== Stands ==
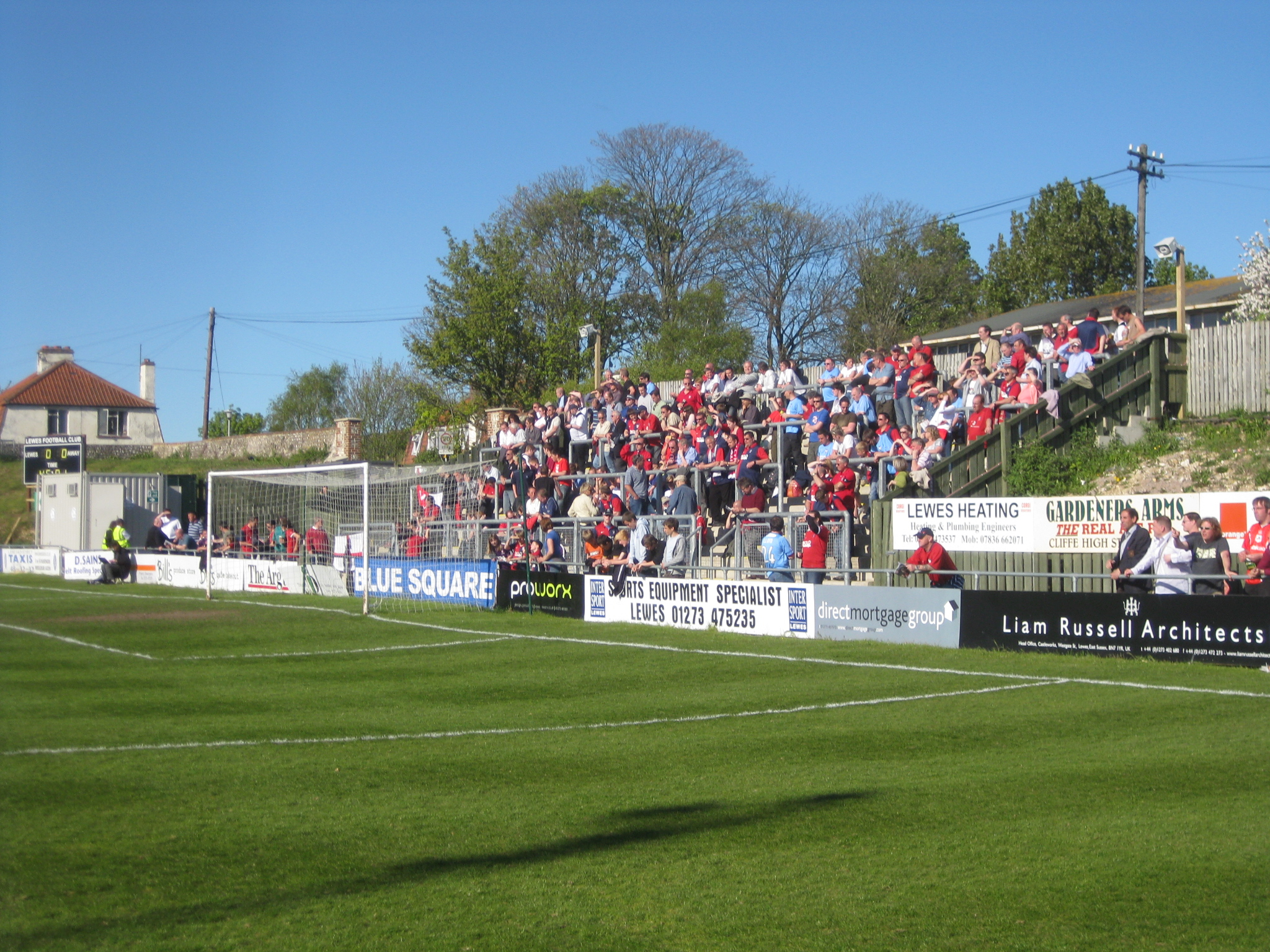
Ham Lane End.

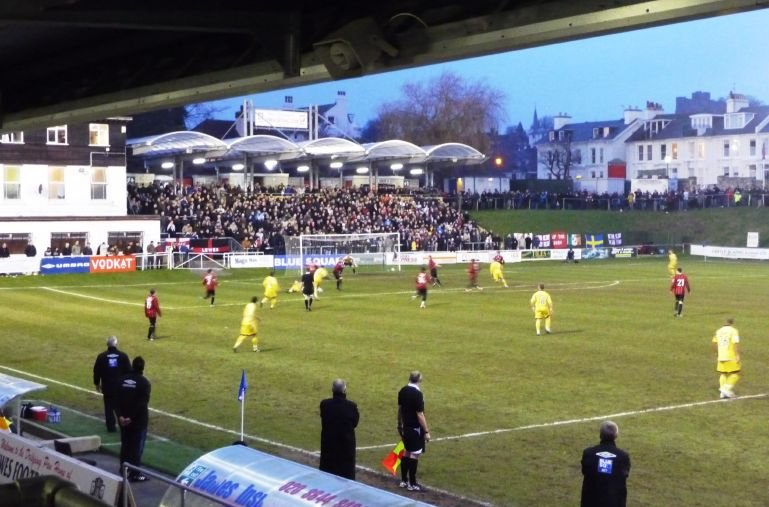
The Philcox Terrace, as viewed from the Rookery Stand.

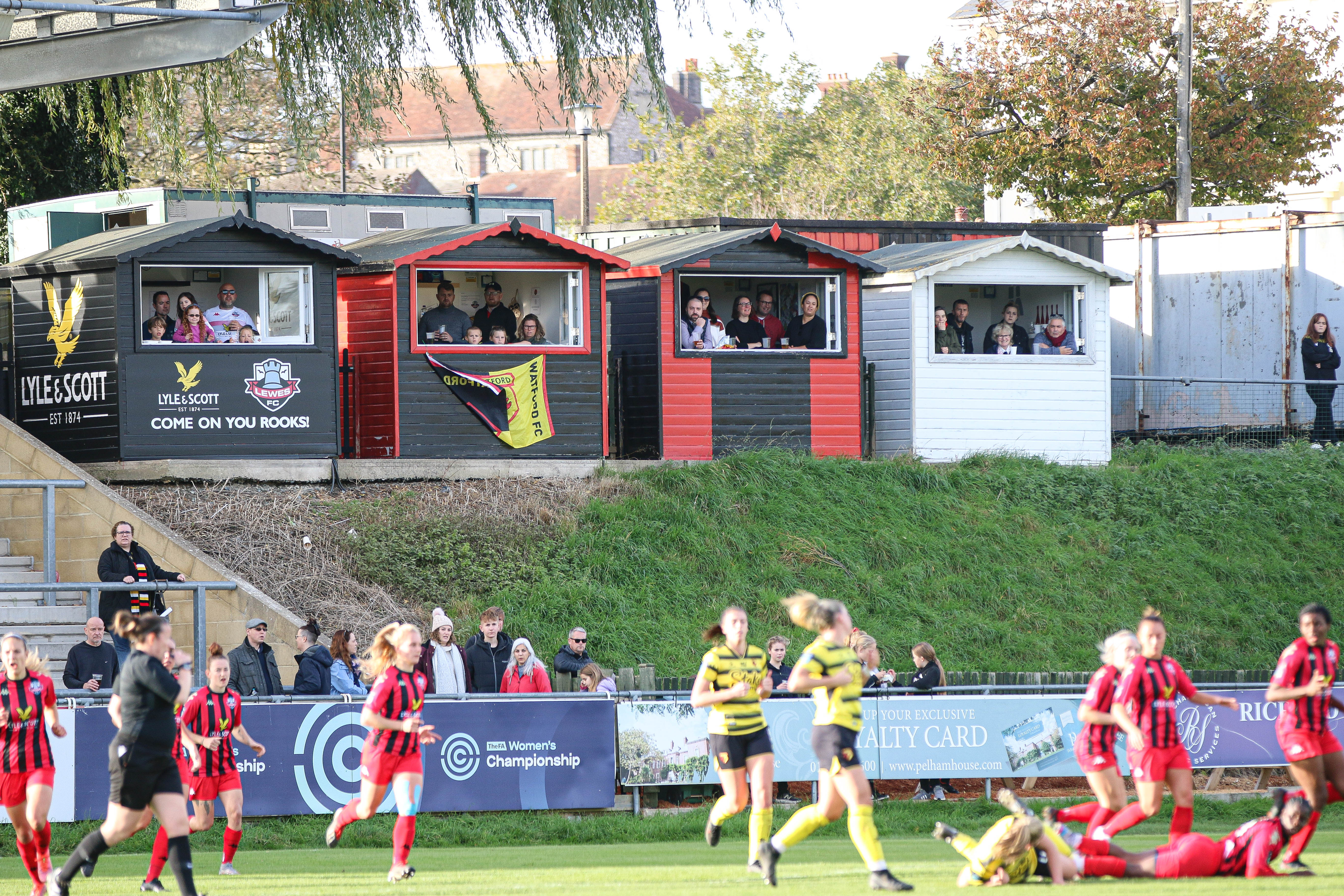
Beach Huts to the right of the Philcox Terrace

The ground has one covered terrace, one uncovered terrace, a grass bank with walkway and a covered stand; a total capacity of 3,000 with seated accommodation for 600 in the main Rookery Stand.

- Rookery Stand, opened in July 2007, is the newest stand at the ground and replaced the aged wooden South stand. It is a covered, all-seater stand.

In summer 2023 this stand had the seating replaced with red leather, soft padded seating from Wembley Stadium.

- Ham Lane End is an uncovered terrace east of the pitch. During Lewes' season in the Conference Premier, strict safety regulations meant away fans had to be segregated here. However, it is normally used by both home and away supporters.
- Philcox Terrace is a covered terrace which was opened in April 2003. From some areas of this terrace the view of one of the corner flags is obscured by the adjacent clubhouse. The top of the terrace affords fine views of the South Downs.
- Grass Bank. There is one original remaining grass bank at the Dripping Pan, running the length of the pitch north of the stadium. Spectators are permitted on the flat walkway along the top of the bank, but the slope itself is fenced off for safety reasons.

There is a small car park adjacent to the ground, which is run by the local council and not owned by the club.

== Bibliography ==
- Maun, Ian (2009). From Commons to Lord's, Volume One: 1700 to 1750. Roger Heavens. ISBN 978-1-900592-52-9.
- McCann, Tim (2004). Sussex Cricket in the Eighteenth Century. Sussex Record Society.
- Waghorn, H. T. (1899). Cricket Scores, Notes, etc. (1730–1773). Blackwood.
- Waghorn, H. T. (1906). The Dawn of Cricket. Electric Press.
- Wilson, Martin (2005). An Index to Waghorn. Bodyline.
