= Peter Laker =

English cricketer and journalist (1926–2014)

Personal information
- Full name: Peter Guy Laker
- Born: 5 December 1926; Hurstpierpoint, Sussex
- Died: 28 February 2014 (aged 87)
- Nickname: Plakes
- Height: 5 ft 10 in (1.78 m)
- Batting: Right-handed
- Bowling: Leg break

Domestic team information
- Years: Team
- 1948–1949: Sussex

Career statistics
Competition	First-class
Matches	2
Runs scored	14
Batting average	14.00
100s/50s	0/0
Top score	8*
Balls bowled	84
Wickets	0
Bowling average	–
5 wickets in innings	–
10 wickets in match	–
Best bowling	–
Catches/stumpings	1/–
- Source: Cricinfo, 27 November 2011

Peter Guy Laker (5 December 1926 – 28 February 2014) was an English cricketer and journalist. He played two first-class matches for Sussex County Cricket Club in the 1940s. He was a right-handed batsman who bowled leg break. In 1949 he joined The Daily Mirror as a sports correspondent, moving up to the cricket correspondents job in 1968. He covered Test match series both at home and abroad from 1968 until 1986 when he retired aged 59.

Laker was born at Hurstpierpoint, Sussex. His parents moved to Lewes in the 1930s, where they ran the Pelham Arms public house. Laker and his younger brother John, were educated at Lewes County Grammar School. He played for Lewes Priory Cricket Club.

He made his first-class debut for Sussex against Middlesex at the County Ground, Hove in the 1948 County Championship. He wasn't required to bat in this match, while with the ball he bowled nine wicketless overs. He made a second first-class appearance the following season against Hampshire at the County Ground, Southampton, He ended not out on 8 in Sussex's first-innings, while in their second-innings he was run out for 6. He also bowled five overs, again without taking a wicket.

He played for the Sussex Second XI in the Minor Counties Championship from 1948 to 1950, played club cricket for Lewes Priory cricket club, and played football for Lewes F.C.

After his retirement from the Mirror, he moved to Somerset. He died at Hatch Beauchamp nearTaunton in 2014.
