= Spellman =

Spellman is a surname. The name is common among English, German and Irish people. The Irish version of the name is derived from Ó Spealáin and is more commonly anglicised as Spillane. Notable people with the surname include:

- A.B. Spellman (born 1935), American poet, music critic and arts administrator
- Alonzo Spellman (born 1971), American professional football player
- Benny Spellman (1931–2011), American R&B singer
- Ceallach Spellman (born 1995), British actor, TV and radio host
- Eugene P. Spellman (1930–1991), American attorney and federal judge 1979–91
- Francis Spellman (1889–1967), American Roman Catholic cardinal; archbishop of New York 1939–67
- Frank Spellman (1922–2017), Olympic champion weightlifter
- Gladys Spellman (1918–1988), American politician from Maryland; U.S. representative 1975–81
- Jack Spellman (1899–1966), American professional football player
- John Spellman (wrestler) (1899–1966), American Olympic wrestler
- John Spellman (1926–2018), American politician from Washington; governor of Washington 1981–85
- Leora Spellman (1890–1945), American vaudeville performer and stage and film actor
- Malcolm Spellman, American screenwriter and producer
- Michael Spellman (born 1978), American film, television, and stage actor
- Michael Spellman (footballer) (born 2002), English association footballer

== Fictional characters ==
From the Sabrina the Teenage Witch comic book series:

- Hilda Spellman
- Sabrina Spellman
- Zelda Spellman

== See also ==
- Spelman College
- Spellman Lake
- Spellman McLaughlin Home
- Spellman Museum of Stamps & Postal History
- Cardinal Spellman High School (disambiguation)
