= Cardinal Spellman High School =

Cardinal Spellman High School is the name of several schools including:

- Cardinal Spellman High School (Brockton, Massachusetts)
- Cardinal Spellman High School (New York City)
