= Mel Spillman =

American probate clerk and fraudster (born 1948)

Mel Spillman (born 1948) is an American probate clerk and fraudster who transferred properties of dead people to his own accounts.

Spillman lived in San Antonio, Texas. In the 1970s he was begun to work as a clerk in Bexar County courthouse. In the 1980s he began to work as a probate consultant in the Bexar County Medical Examiner's Office, handling funeral arrangements and other affairs of people who had died without heirs. His job was to sell off the property of the deceased and turn to proceeds over to the state. His coworkers knew him as a jovial man.

Spillman lived in a lavish house and seemed fond of Ferraris. He bought five of them and raced in racing events all over the USA. He even started his own racing team and had his own Formula One racing car. He said that he had inherited money from dead relatives.

In fact, Spillman stole money from the estates of dead people. He forged documents and turned the estate over to himself. When he sold the remaining property of the deceased, he did not turn the proceeds over to the state but transferred to money to himself. Sometimes he took over the house of the deceased and put it up for rent. In couple of cases he defrauded the real heirs with forged wills. He might also claim antiques and other items from the deceased's home for himself.

According to later police investigation, he began his forgeries around 1986. Over 15 years, Spillman stole over $5 million from estates of 122 people. His position was officially eliminated 1988 but he continued to do the job. Spillman retired 1999 but said he would continue his work as a private consultant.

In 2001 one of the probate judges notice that Spillman's name was listed on papers that could not be tracked through official channels. Other papers listed Spillman as a court administrator.

Spillman was arrested in July 2002 in a sting operation when he left a bank with $900 from a liquidated estate. Investigators found records of the forged wills and defrauded estates in his home. They included real wills Spillman has ignored for his own benefit and papers and mementos from the estates he had drained.

Spillman was charged with tampering with government records, impersonating a public servant and forgery. In 2002, he pleaded guilty to fraud and was sentenced to ten years in state prison. His sister also pleaded guilty in pillaging one estate. He was paroled in 2008.
