= Taffy Spelman =

English footballer

Personal information
- Full name: Isaac Spelman
- Date of birth: 9 March 1914
- Place of birth: Newcastle upon Tyne, England
- Date of death: April 2003 (aged 89)
- Place of death: Newcastle upon Tyne, England
- Height: 5 ft 7 1/2 in (1.71 m)
- Position: Right half

Senior career*
| Years | Team | Apps | (Gls) |
| | Usworth Colliery | ? | (?) |
| 1933 | Leeds United | 0 | (0) |
| 1935–1936 | Southend United | 43 | (3) |
| 1937–1938 | Tottenham Hotspur | 28 | (2) |
| 1946 | Hartlepool United | 25 | (0) |
- * Club domestic league appearances and goals

Isaac "Taffy" Spelman (9 March 1914 – April 2003) was an English professional footballer who played for Usworth Colliery, Leeds United, Southend United, Tottenham Hotspur, Hartlepool United.

== Football career ==
Spelman began his career at Usworth Colliery before joining Leeds United in 1933. The right half signed for Southend United in May 1935, he made a total of 50 appearances and scored three goals in all competitions for the Shrimpers. Spelman was transferred to Tottenham Hotspur in May 1937 and went on to feature in a further 32 matches and scored two goals in all competitions for the Lilywhites. After World War II Spelman joined Hartlepool in 1946 and played in 25 games.
