= Softball cricket =

Short form of cricket played by women in UK

Logo used by the ECB to promote women's softball cricket

Softball cricket (or soft ball cricket) is a short form variation of the sport of cricket, played by women and girls in England and Wales. It is different from women's cricket: the latter is sometimes referred to as "women's hardball cricket" where a distinction is necessary.

In 2017 the England and Wales Cricket Board (ECB) set up 180 soft ball cricket one-day festivals to introduce women to the game. These festivals continued with, for example, 25 festivals held in Derbyshire and 14 in Cornwall in 2023. As of 2023 there are women's softball leagues in several counties, such as Cornwall, Westmorland, and Yorkshire.

== Play ==
The ECB has produced a "Player Guide" describing softball cricket, which begins with the statement "The aim of soft ball cricket is to have fun." As described by the ECB softball cricket is played by teams of six to eight players, divided into pairs. The game "should last no more than an hour". Each pair will bat for two or three six-ball overs, and all players are encouraged to take a turn at bowling. Overarm bowling is encouraged, but underarm bowling is allowed. Fielders are advised to "position themselves at a safe distance from the batter when the ball is bowled".

=== Scoring ===
The scoring system gives each team an initial score of 200. Points are gained for runs and boundaries (six if the ball crosses the boundary without touching the ground first, four if it touches the ground), and for wides and no-balls, and five points are lost when a batter is "out", which may be by being bowled, caught, run out, stumped, or hitting the wicket. There is no "leg before wicket" rule except that a player can be out if they deliberately block the ball with their leg or foot. The winning team is that with the greatest number of points at the end of the game.

=== Pitch and equipment ===
The game is played with stumps "roughly 20 metres apart", and uses specialised non-wooden bats and a ball softer and lighter than that used in conventional cricket: the official ECB women's softball cricket ball weighs 3.5 ounces (99 g), while the ball used in standard women's cricket weighs between 4.94 ounces (140 g) and 5.31 ounces (151 g).
