= Spielmann =

Spielmann or Spielman is a German occupational surname, which means "jester", from the Middle High German spilære. The name may refer to:

- Amanda Spielman (born 1961), British Chief Inspector of Schools
- Andrew Spielman (1930–2006), American medical researcher
- Chris Spielman (born 1965), American football player
- Christian Spielmann (born 1963), German physicist
- Dan Spielman (born 1979), Australian actor
- Daniel Spielman (born 1970), American computer scientist
- David Spielman (born 1950), American photographer
- Dean Spielmann (born 1962), Luxembourg judge
- Francisc Spielmann (1916–1974), Romanian footballer
- Fritz Spielmann, aka Fred Spielman (1906–1987), Austrian composer and cabaret artist
- Götz Spielmann (born 1961), Austrian film director
- Isidore Spielmann (1854–1925), British engineer & art-connoisseur
- Lori Nelson Spielman (born 1961), American author
- Marion Harry Spielmann (1858–1948), British art critic
- Peter James Spielmann (born 1952), American journalist
- Rick Spielman (born 1962), American football manager
- Rudolf Spielmann (1883–1942), Austrian chess player

== See also ==
- Spielman, Maryland
- Max Spielmann, a division of UK retailer Timpson
