= David Spielman =

American freelance photographer (born 1950)

- Born: David G. Spielman; 1950 (age 75–76); Tulsa, Oklahoma, U.S.
- Education: Central High School; Westminster College
- Occupation: Freelance photographer
- Website: www.davidspielman.com/index

David G. Spielman (born 1950) is an American freelance photographer based in New Orleans.

== Early life ==
Spielman was born in Tulsa, Oklahoma, and graduated from Tulsa Central High School. He then attended and graduated from Westminster College in Fulton, Missouri.

Spielman's interest in photography began at the age of 15. When he looked through a camera, his blood pressure dropped and his pulse slowed. He knew in that instant he wanted to be a photographer. While Spielman was attending Westminster College, a WWII-bombed out Christopher Wren church from London was transported to Fulton and reconstructed on Westminster's campus, honoring Winston Churchill's visit and speech in which he coined the phrase "Iron Curtain". As the photographer for his college's newspaper, Spielman had the unique opportunity to photograph Lord Louis Mountbatten, who was in attendance for the opening of the reconstruction in 1969. Spielman would later get to photograph Mikhail Gorbachev in 1992 at Westminster. Most of Spielman's senior year was spent in Vienna and traveling in Europe studying art history. He credits this experience as a turning point, helping him understand and appreciate composition and design.

== Photography career ==
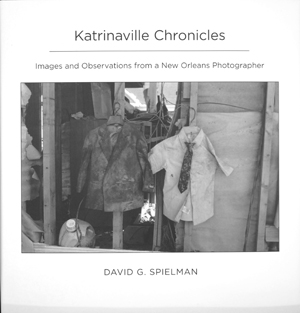
Katrinaville Chronicles

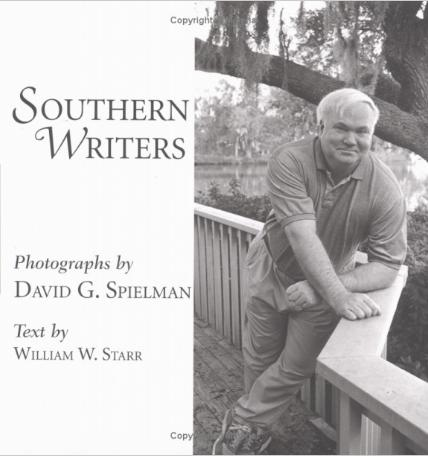
Southern Writers

After graduation Spielman moved south to New Orleans to start his photographic career. He has never been employed as a staffer or photographer of record, but rather has always been a freelance photographer. With projects around the world, his work has taken him to France, England, Ireland, Russia, Egypt, Pakistan, Singapore, Hong Kong, Central America and other locations. From world leaders, corporate reports and personal projects, his traveling has been constant and extensive. His images have appeared in numerous magazines and newspapers, including The Times, The New York Times, Los Angeles Times, Time, Newsweek, Forbes, and Architectural Digest.

David Spielman was awarded the Michael P. Smith Memorial Award For Documentary Photography in 2016 by Louisiana Endowment for the Humanities.

Spielman received the chevalier (knight) of the Ordre des Arts et des Lettres by the French Minister of Culture in 2020. This lifetime distinction is awarded to those who have contributed significantly to furthering the arts in France and throughout the world. Vincent Sciama, the Consul General of France, declared "Awarding this prestigious distinction to David Spielman is not only recognizing his extraordinary talent as a photographer, but also his love for and connection to France alongside his role as a vibrant member of the artistic life of New Orleans."

In 2022, Spielman was awarded the Westminster College Alumni Achievement Award.

Spielman’s work, born from his own visionary ideas and pursued through both personal effort and strategic connections, has been featured in several books:

Southern Writers has 72 portraits of Southern authors; including Eudora Welty, Pat Conroy, Richard Ford, James Dickey, Ernest Gaines, Shelby Foote, Anne Rice and many others. Working quickly, Spielman usually shoots in a comfortable and relaxed location insuring a pleasant and revealing portrait. Many of the authors portrayed are at their own desks. This project explores the muses and methods employed by writers to unravel the creative processes and influences behind their literary works.

New Orleans Musicians: When Not Performing is a collection of portraits of 71 musicians when not on stage. Each was asked where they wanted to be photographed, which offers the viewer a glimpse into their lives. The book includes Dr. John, Pete Fountain, Harry Connick, Frogman Henry, Fats Domino, Irma Thomas, Allen Toussaint and more. As he did in Southern Writers, Spielman works quickly, usually one on one, as he feels more people there causes distractions for the subject. His method allows an intimate and personal exchange between the subject and photographer.

Katrinaville Chronicles is Spielman's start to a long-term photographic essay about Hurricane Katrina and its aftermath. Not being a "hard news" guy, his approach was that of an observer trying to document what happened to his own city, New Orleans. Working slowly and very deliberately, he traversed the city searching for images that would tell a story. Spielman always attempts to render the best possible image, leaving his biases out of the way. This book also includes his e-mails to family and friends. Never thinking that his words and observations would be part of a book, it was just his first-person account of what he was seeing and feeling after the storm when the city was almost void of people. He modeled his work after that of the photographers who documented the Great Depression and Dust Bowl. This was his WPA; the only difference was there was no government funding and no editors to help tell them where to go. He was on his own, shooting and funding his work without any outside help.

The Katrina Decade is a book and major exhibition with the Historic New Orleans Collection, documenting the ten years after Hurricane Katrina. Spielman continued to photograph New Orleans post-storm, documenting areas and neighborhoods that may be missed by someone less familiar with New Orleans. With much rebuilding in progress, the recovery didn't reach and include everyone and every place. The book shows houses completely vine-covered and structures stripped of any and all valuable architectural details. A melancholy beauty with a haunting air overtook many parts of the city. The Historic New Orleans Collected hosted a major tenth-anniversary show of Spielman's Katrina work.

== Gallery and museum showcases ==
Spielman's work continues to be collected throughout the U.S., Europe and Asia. The Historic New Orleans Collection and the Ogden Museum of Southern Art both have many of his images in their permanent collections. He also continues to give lectures, talks and workshops about all of his work. Spielman maintains a gallery in the historic Garden District, where his photos can be viewed year-round. When you stop in, he'll often be at his desk, ready to greet you and tell you the stories behind the images of his life's work.

== Publications ==
- New Orleans Portrayed published by Louisiana Press 2020
- The Katrina Decade: Images of an Altered City published by the Historic New Orleans Collection 2015
- New Orleans Musicians: When Not Performing published by Pelican Publishing Company 2012
- Katrinaville Chronicles published by LSU Press 2007
- Arnaud's Restaurant Cookbook published by Pelican Publishing Company 2005
- Dickie Brennan's Palace Café Cook Book, published 2002
- Southern Writers published by South Carolina Press 1997
