= George Spillman =

English cricketer

George Spillman (24 October 1856 – 18 April 1911) was an English first-class cricketer active 1877–86 who played for Middlesex. He was born in London; died in Brighton.
