= Christian Spielmann =

German physicist

Christian Spielmann (born 1963, Innsbruck, Austria) is an Austrian physicist and a professor at the University of Jena.

== Education and career ==
Spielmann obtained his Ph.D. in 1989 at the Vienna University of Technology where he also habilitated in 1999. In 2002 he became professor of experimental physics at the University of Würzburg, before moving to Jena in 2008. In 1998, Spielman received the Fritz-Kohlrausch-Physik Award (for achievements in experimental physics by junior scientists) from the Austrian Physical Society and in 2011 the Thuringian Research Award for his work in X-ray spectroscopy.
