= Rückeroth =

- Municipality
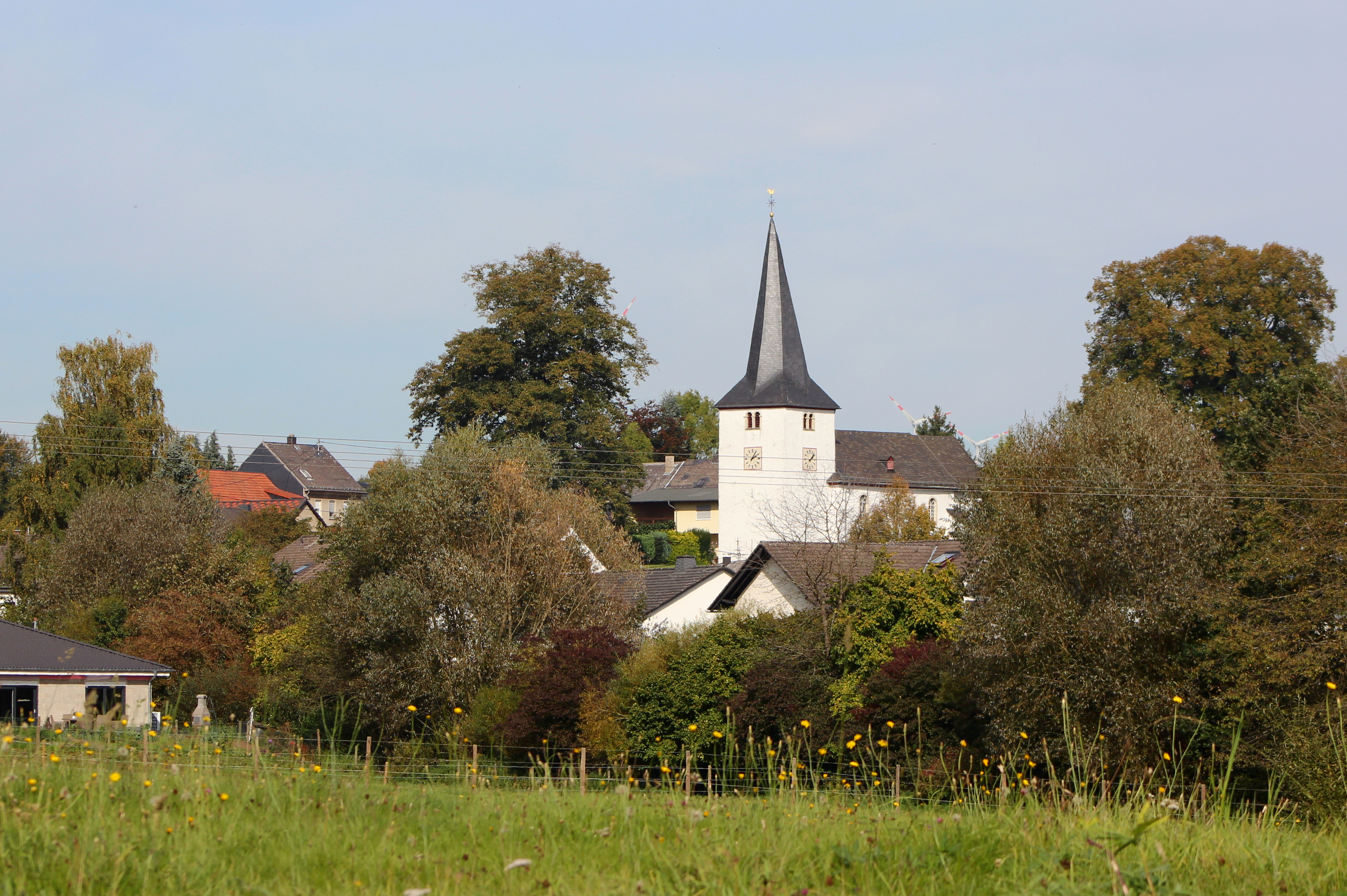

- Coat of arms

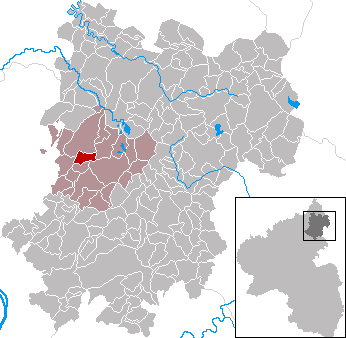
- Location of Rückeroth within Westerwaldkreis district
- Interactive map of Rückeroth
- Location within Germany Location within Rhineland-Palatinate
- Coordinates: 50°33′42″N 7°44′43″E
- Country: Germany
- State: Rhineland-Palatinate
- District: Westerwaldkreis
- Municipal assoc.: Selters (Westerwald)

Government
  - Mayor (2019–24): Bodo Weinmann

Area
  - Total: 3.47 km^{2} (1.34 sq mi)
- Elevation: 282 m (925 ft)

Population (2025-12-31)
  - Total: 475
  - Density: 137/km^{2} (355/sq mi)
- Time zone: UTC+01:00 (CET)
  - Summer (DST): UTC+02:00 (CEST)
- Postal codes: 56244
- Dialling codes: 02626
- Vehicle registration: WW
- Website: www.selters-ww.de

Rückeroth is an Ortsgemeinde – a community belonging to a Verbandsgemeinde – in the Westerwaldkreis in Rhineland-Palatinate, Germany.

== Geography ==
Rückeroth lies 1 km from Herschbach and 4 km from Selters. It belongs to the Verbandsgemeinde of Selters, a kind of collective municipality. Its seat is in the like-named town.

== History ==
In 1259, Rückeroth had its first documentary mention. In the middle of the community stands an Evangelical church that was built between 1240 and 1250. Right near the church is found a very old linden tree whose exact age is unknown, although what is known is that in the Middle Ages it served as the “court linden” (Gerichtslinde). In the late 19th century, a volunteer fire brigade was established, which still exists now.

== Politics ==
The municipal council is made up of 8 council members, as well as the honorary and presiding mayor (Ortsbürgermeister), who were elected in a majority vote in a municipal election on 13 June 2004.

== Regular events ==
As well as the volunteer fire brigade, there are in Rückeroth a shooting club and a table tennis club. Each summer, tractor fans from the surrounding area meet at the village square for their Oldtimertreffen, a vintage vehicle rally. A kermis to mark the church's consecration was no longer held after 2000 owing to a lack of “resonance”; however, the kermis was to have been held once again in 2007.

== Economy and infrastructure ==
Northwest of the community runs Bundesstraße 413, leading from Bendorf to Hachenburg. The nearest Autobahn interchange is Dierdorf on the A 3 (Cologne–Frankfurt).

Through a station on the Selters-Hachenburg narrow gauge railway Rückeroth has been connected to the public rail transport in the past.

The nearest InterCityExpress stop is the railway station at Montabaur on the Cologne-Frankfurt high-speed rail line.
