= Huf Haus =

German company

Huf Haus GmbH & Co. KG
- Company type: Family-owned
- Industry: Unique wood-glass prefabricated houses
- Founded: 1912; 114 years ago
- Founder: Johann Huf
- Headquarters: Hartenfels, Westerwald, Germany
- Area served: Worldwide
- Key people: Georg Huf (CEO)
- Revenue: €100 million (2008)
- Number of employees: 434 (2007)
- Website: huf-haus.com

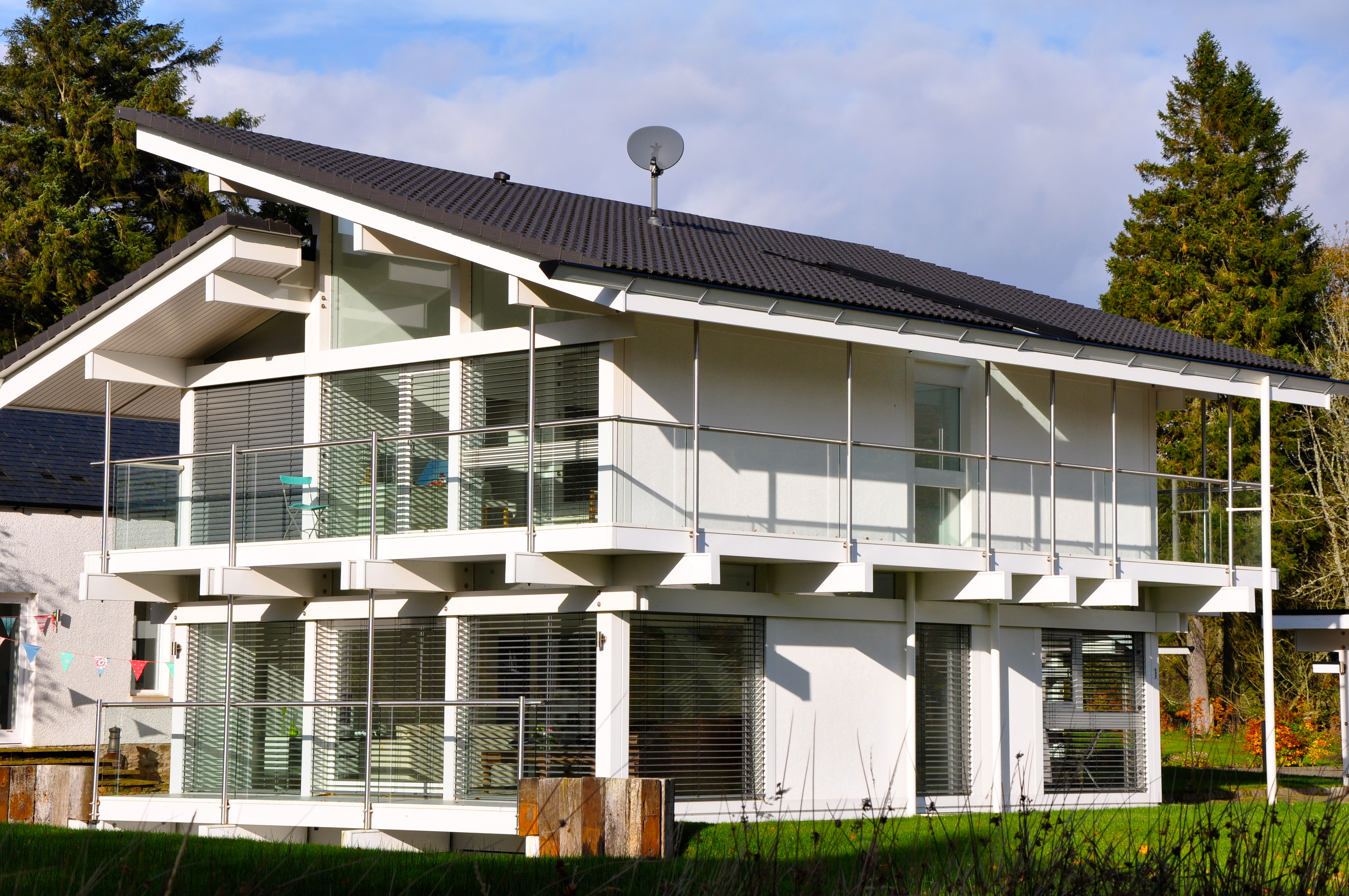
A Huf Haus near West Linton in Scotland.

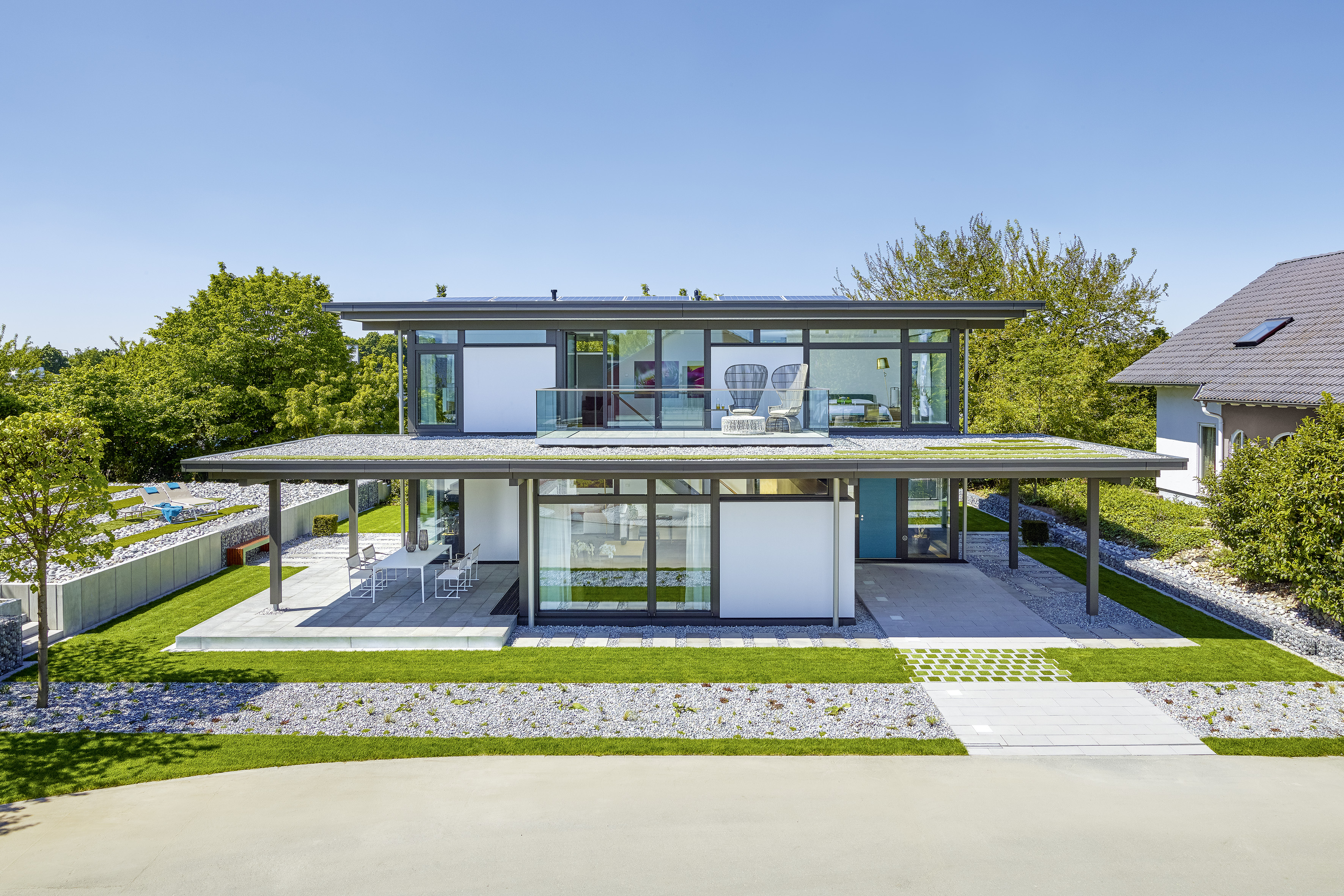
Huf Haus Modum in Mannheim, Germany

Huf Haus GmbH & Co. KG is a German company operating worldwide and based in Hartenfels, Westerwald region, that manufactures prefabricated timber-framed houses. The houses combine modern glass facades with German Fachwerk ("half-timbered") design. Each building is individually designed. The homes, also called Huf houses, are available as zero-energy buildings.

== History ==
In 1912, Johann Huf founded a carpentry workshop in the small village of Krümmel in the Westerwald. A year later, the enterprise moved to Hartenfels. In 1948 his son Franz Huf took over management of the enterprise, and enlarged it to a supra-regional provider of carpenter's works, e. g. churches in the Rhineland, the large post administration office in Bonn (1950) as well as the German and Arabic pavilions at Expo 58. The so-called "Huf Fachwerkhaus 2000" was designed in 1972 together with architect Manfred Adams. The principles of this construction are still the standard in all Huf houses. Since 1996, grandsons Georg and Thomas Huf have led the company and brought the products to the world market. They also established "The Huf Haus Village", a collection of Huf family houses, which represent the possibilities of building Huf houses.

On 20 September 2011, Thomas Huf died aged 51.

== New designs ==
Near the end of 2009, Huf Haus started newly designed houses with a focus on energy efficiency.

Because the expressive symbiosis of wood and glass finds recognition at major international architecture and design competitions, and among Huf Haus clients, who also acknowledge that it can be individually designed, the main stylistic elements have not changed.

Despite the generous use of glass the Huf Haus houses require only a heating rate of 34 W/m^{2} (at Hartenfels, Germany). The main reasons are:

- All constructional wood elements are fitted with a heat-insulation layer put together at the factory - this reduces thermal bridges.
- The already well-insulated walls have been redesigned. The walls are thicker now and their depth can be varied depending on the climatic region. The material used is tailored to the location, so that an adequate heat insulation is achieved.
- The glass walls have 51 mm triple glazing with a heat transfer coefficient (U-value) of 0.6 W/m^{2}K.
- Home technology is based on a heat pump, electronically regulated heating systems, under floor heating pipes laid very closely together, a highly efficient ventilation system and independent domestic hot water pumps, so that the independent heating system can be switched off during the summer months.
- A large photovoltaic system across nearly the whole roof.

== Exports ==
The company delivers around the world and they restrict their production to 200 houses a year to keep the unique character of the houses. Of these, about 50 a year are exported to the United Kingdom (UK). As a result, an independent "Huf Haus owners' club" has been established there. Since 2009 the official sales office for the US market has been dotGreen Inc., based in Cleveland, Ohio.

== Awards ==
Huf Haus products have won several architectural prizes, including:

- 1977 "Haus des Jahres" (house of the year) by the government of Rheinland-Pfalz, Germany;
- 2002 Housing Design Award of the Royal Institute of British Architects, UK;
- 2001, 2009 Deutscher Solarpreis (German Solar Award - a prize for the best project on renewable energy in Germany) by EUROSOLAR e. V. in Bonn, Germany;
- 2000, 2002, 2003, 2004 prize of "The National HomeBuilder Design Awards". This house in Walton-on-Thames in the United Kingdom has also been featured on the Channel 4 programme Grand Designs.
