= Freirachdorf =

- Municipality
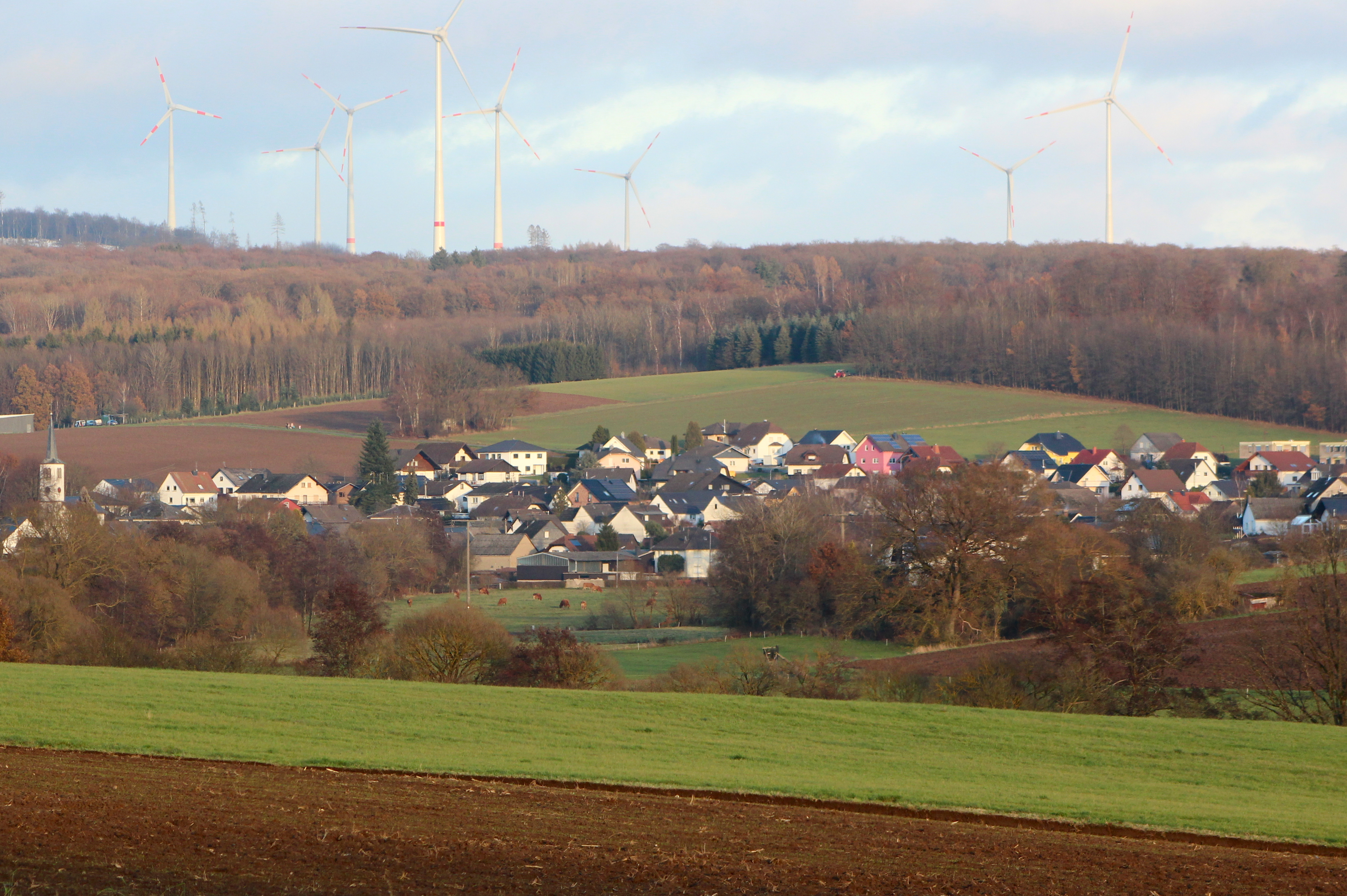
- Interactive map of Freirachdorf
- Location within Germany Location within Rhineland-Palatinate
- Coordinates: 50°35′02″N 7°42′54″E
- Country: Germany
- State: Rhineland-Palatinate
- District: Westerwaldkreis
- Municipal assoc.: Selters (Westerwald)

Government
  - Mayor (2019–24): Hans-Peter Hebel

Area
  - Total: 4.28 km^{2} (1.65 sq mi)
- Elevation: 275 m (902 ft)

Population (2025-12-31)
  - Total: 711
  - Density: 166/km^{2} (430/sq mi)
- Time zone: UTC+01:00 (CET)
  - Summer (DST): UTC+02:00 (CEST)
- Postal codes: 56244
- Dialling codes: 02680
- Vehicle registration: WW
- Website: www.selters-ww.de

Freirachdorf is an Ortsgemeinde – a municipality belonging to a Verbandsgemeinde – in the Westerwaldkreis in Rhineland-Palatinate, Germany. The municipality belongs to the Verbandsgemeinde of Selters, a kind of collective municipality.

== Geography ==
Freirachdorf lies 1 km from Herschbach and 7 km from Selters (Westerwald).

== History ==
In 1190, Freirachdorf had its first documentary mention. In 1972, in the course of municipal restructuring, the Verbandsgemeinde of Selters was founded, which Freirachdorf also joined.

== Politics ==
The municipal council is made up of 12 council members, as well as the honorary and presiding mayor (Ortsbürgermeisterin), who were elected in a majority vote in a municipal election on 7 June 2009.

== Economy and infrastructure ==
=== Businesses ===
- Müsing, bicycle manufacturer

=== Transport ===
Southwest of the municipality runs Bundesstraße 413 leading from Bendorf to Hachenburg. The nearest Autobahn interchange is Dierdorf on the A 3 (Cologne–Frankfurt). The nearest InterCityExpress stop is the railway station at Montabaur on the Cologne-Frankfurt high-speed rail line.
