= Hartenfels =

- Municipality
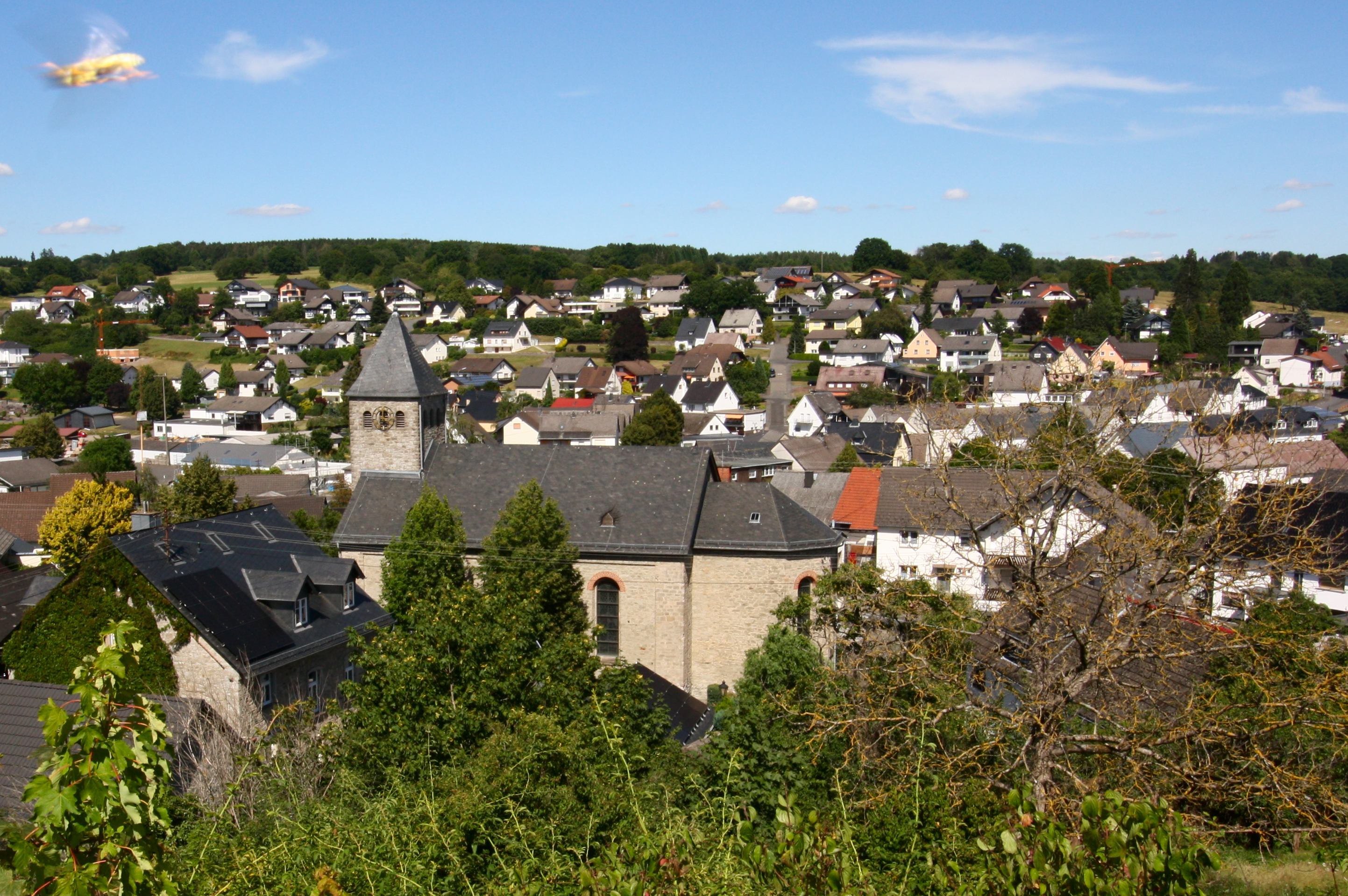

- Coat of arms

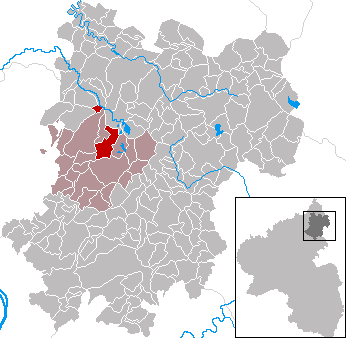
- Location of Hartenfels within Westerwaldkreis district
- Interactive map of Hartenfels
- Location within Germany Location within Rhineland-Palatinate
- Coordinates: 50°34′26″N 7°47′14″E
- Country: Germany
- State: Rhineland-Palatinate
- District: Westerwaldkreis
- Municipal assoc.: Selters (Westerwald)

Government
  - Mayor (2019–24): Andreas Strüder

Area
  - Total: 8.15 km^{2} (3.15 sq mi)
- Elevation: 350 m (1,150 ft)

Population (2025-12-31)
  - Total: 773
  - Density: 94.8/km^{2} (246/sq mi)
- Time zone: UTC+01:00 (CET)
  - Summer (DST): UTC+02:00 (CEST)
- Postal codes: 56244
- Dialling codes: 02626
- Vehicle registration: WW
- Website: www.selters-ww.de

Hartenfels is an Ortsgemeinde – a community belonging to a Verbandsgemeinde – in the Westerwaldkreis in Rhineland-Palatinate, Germany. The community belongs to the Verbandsgemeinde of Selters, a kind of collective municipality.

== Geography ==
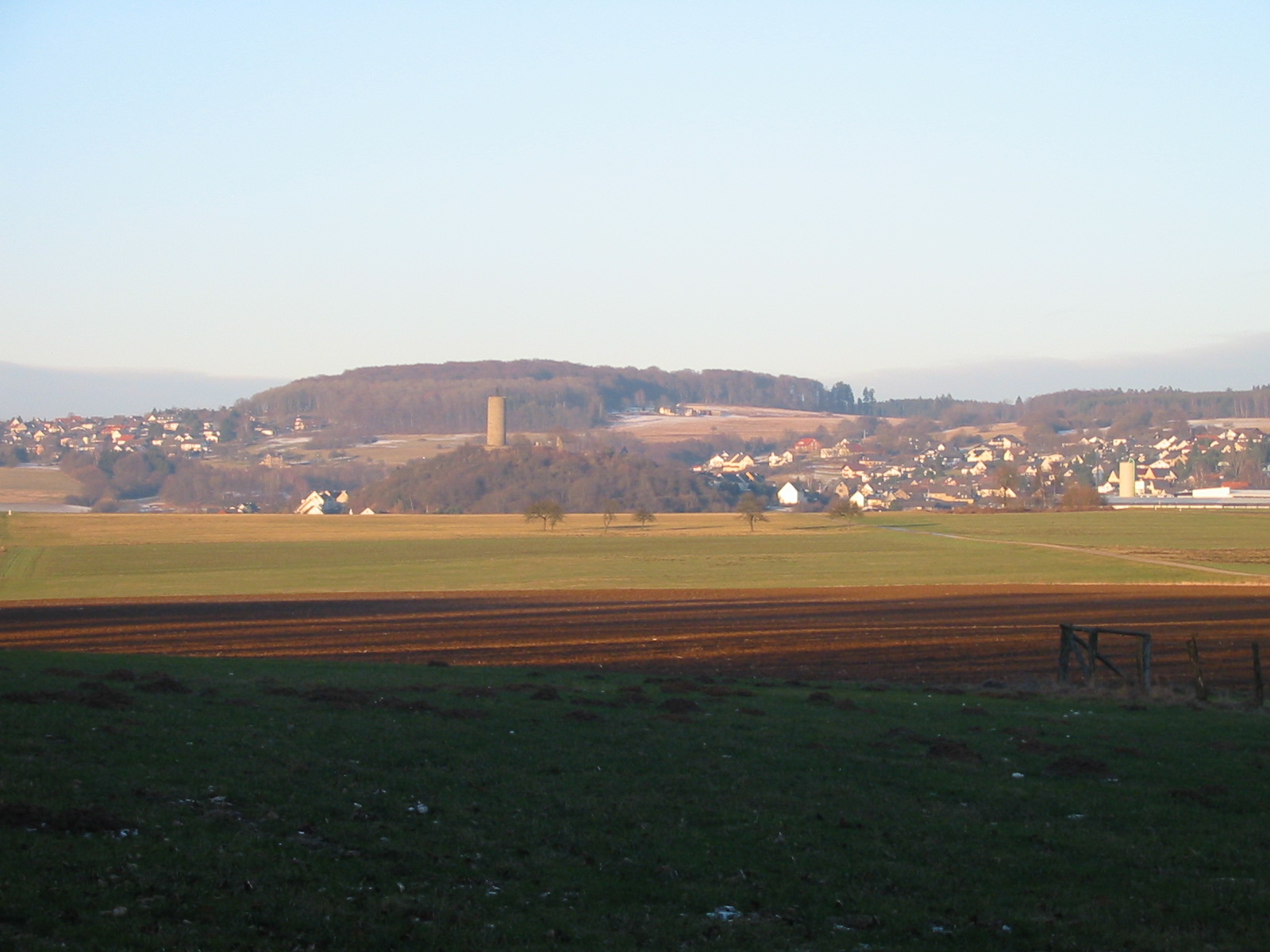
Hartenfels together with the Burgberg

Hartenfels lies 4 km from Herschbach and 8 km from Selters on the Holzbach.

== History ==
Hartenfels Castle was first mentioned in old writings in 1249. The community is known for its castle ruins, of whose former shape only a few walls and one tower now remain. It was built in the 13th century to keep watch over the nearby trade road leading from Frankfurt to Cologne. In dialectal speech, the ruins bear the name Schmanddippe. In 1999, the community celebrated 750 years of existence. Seven years later came a chronicle.

== Politics ==
The municipal council is made up of 12 council members, as well as the honorary and presiding mayor (Ortsbürgermeister), who were elected in a majority vote in a municipal election on 7 June 2009.

== Economy and infrastructure ==
The most important employer is Huf Haus GmbH & Co which employs 470 people.

=== Hartenfelser Kopf Windfarm ===
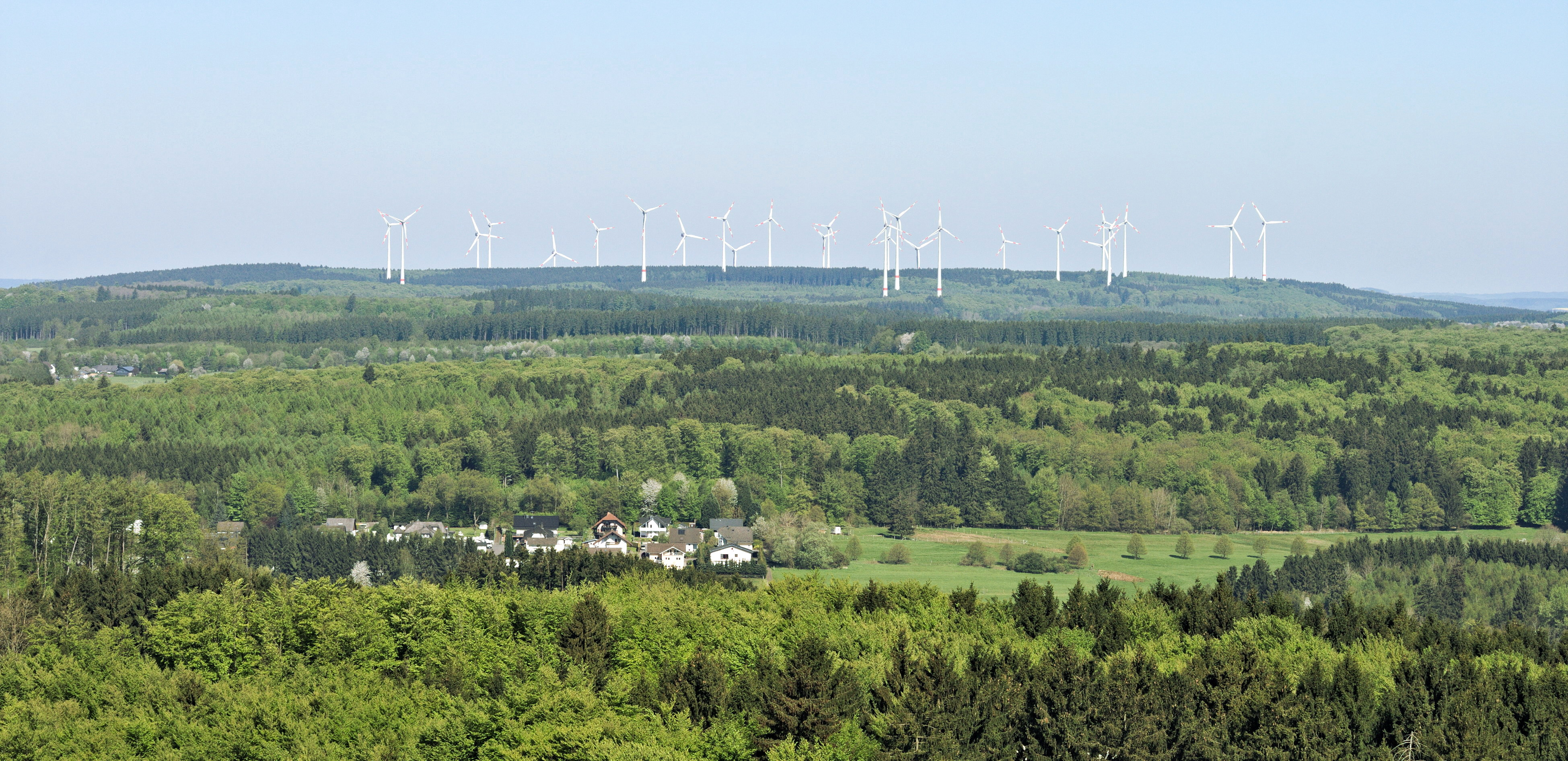
Hartenfels Kopf wind farm

In the summer of 2006, a wind farm of 12 Enercon E-70 wind turbines were installed on the Hartenfelser Kopf. These supply roughly 12,500 households, making it one of the biggest windfarm projects in a forest that has ever been built in the Federal Republic. Four of the turbines stand within Hartenfels’s limits.

=== Regular events ===
In January, in honour of the community’s patron saint, Anthony, whose feast day is 17 January, two concerts are held by the community’s music club on two consecutive weekends. On the Burgberg (“Castle Mountain”), the yearly music festival Rock am Turm is held at Whitsun. At Christmas, a lit, real fir tree (Tannenbaum in German) up to 8 m tall is put up on top of the castle tower. The kermis in Hartenfels is usually held on the first weekend in July.

=== Choirs, clubs, etc. ===
The community is enriched by a music club with many members, a likewise popular volunteer fire brigade, a Möhnenverein (roughly, “Foolish Women’s Club” – it is an organization devoted to the yearly Carnival festivities) with a men’s ballet, as well as a church choir.

=== Transport ===
The community lies west of Bundesstraße 8, leading from Limburg an der Lahn to Siegburg. The nearest Autobahn interchange is Mogendorf on the A 3 (Cologne–Frankfurt). There are further Autobahn interchanges near Dierdorf and Montabaur. The nearest InterCityExpress stop is the railway station at Montabaur on the Cologne-Frankfurt high-speed rail line.
