= Herschbach, Selters =

Herschbach
- Municipality
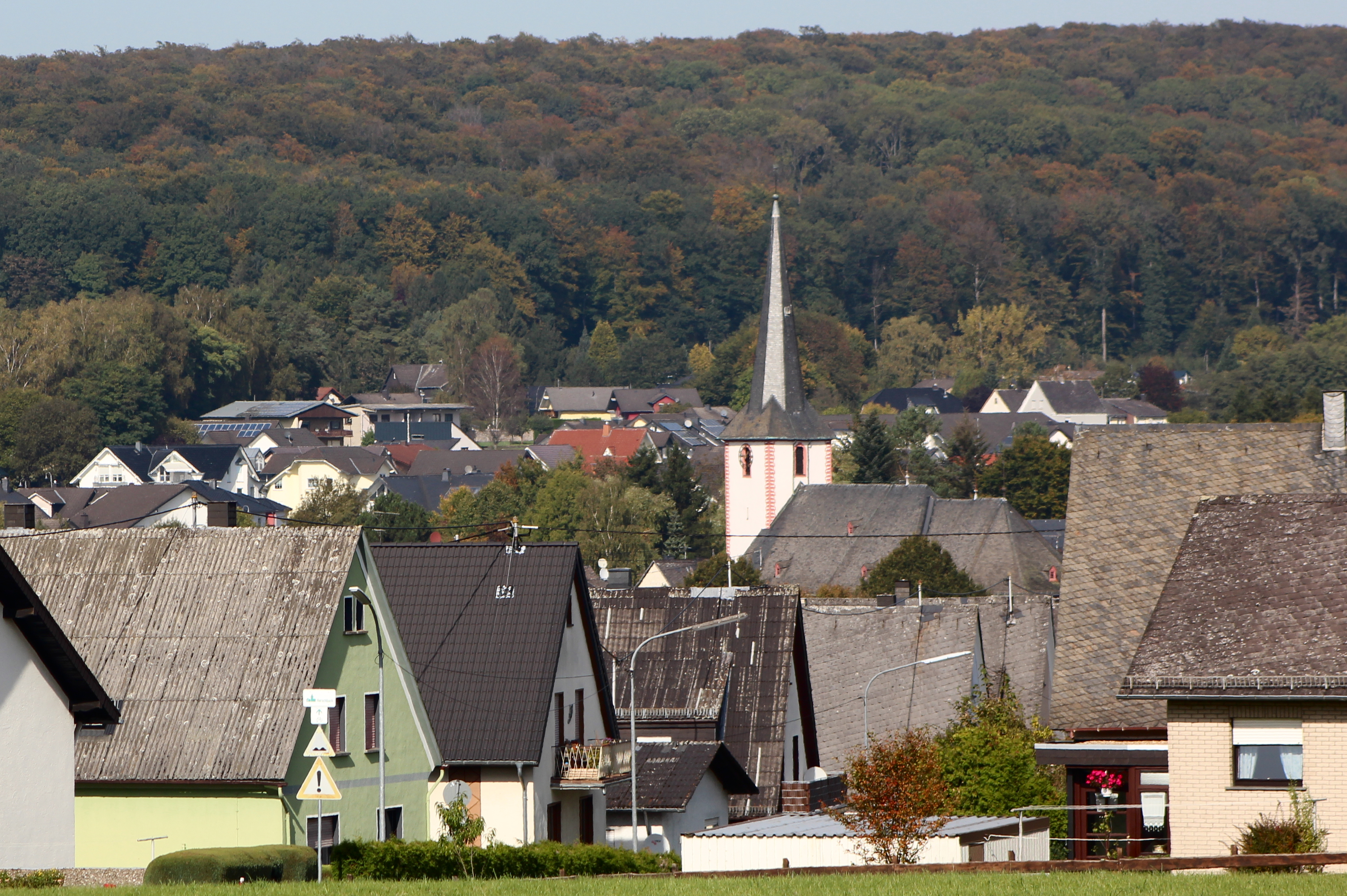

- Coat of arms

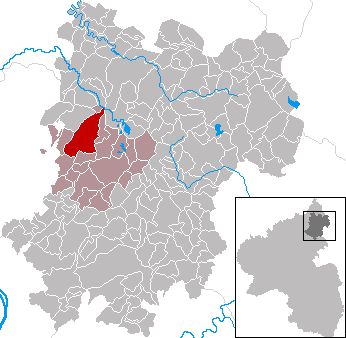
- Location of Herschbach within Westerwaldkreis district
- Interactive map of Herschbach
- Location within Germany Location within Rhineland-Palatinate
- Coordinates: 50°34′30″N 07°44′21″E
- Country: Germany
- State: Rhineland-Palatinate
- District: Westerwaldkreis
- Municipal assoc.: Selters (Westerwald)

Government
  - Mayor (2019–24): Axel Spiekermann (CDU)

Area
  - Total: 15.74 km^{2} (6.08 sq mi)
- Elevation: 280 m (920 ft)

Population (2025-12-31)
  - Total: 3,022
  - Density: 192.0/km^{2} (497.3/sq mi)
- Time zone: UTC+01:00 (CET)
  - Summer (DST): UTC+02:00 (CEST)
- Postal codes: 56249
- Dialling codes: 02626
- Vehicle registration: WW
- Website: www.herschbach.de

Herschbach (German pronunciation: [ˈhɛʁʃbax]) is a state-recognized “air” health resort (Luftkurort) in the Westerwaldkreis and the biggest Ortsgemeinde – a community belonging to a Verbandsgemeinde – in the Verbandsgemeinde of Selters, in Rhineland-Palatinate, Germany.

== Geography ==
=== Location ===
Herschbach is found in the Dierdorf Hollow, which is itself nestled in the hilly low mountain region of the lower Westerwald halfway between Cologne and Frankfurt am Main. The municipal area is home to three conservation areas (Naturschutzgebiete) as well as an 800-ha community forest. Right nearby is the Westerwald Lake Plateau on which rises the Holzbach, which also flows through the municipal area.

=== Neighbouring communities ===
Bordering on the community are, clockwise beginning in the north, Mündersbach (3 km), Schenkelberg (3 km), Hartenfels (3 km), Rückeroth (1 km), Marienrachdorf (3 km) and Freirachdorf (2 km). The nearest towns are Selters (6 km to the south), Dierdorf (7 km to the west) and Hachenburg (14 km to the north). Koblenz (35 km to the southwest), Siegen (51 km to the northeast) and Bonn (60 km to the northwest) are the nearest cities.

== History ==
Written records about Herschbach begin with its first documentary mention in 1248. It can be assumed, however, that the area had already been settled long before that, as a place named Hergispach crops up in the Engers Chronicle from 963. Moreover, the find of a “west German beaker adorned with band”, a replica of which is exhibited at the Landschaftsmuseum Westerwald in Hachenburg, bears witness to a human presence in the area some 4,000 years ago.

In 1343, Emperor Karl IV granted Herschbach town rights, although these were withdrawn 14 years later. At this time, the mediaeval settlement consisted of the moated castle (Arx Hergispach, first documentary mention in 1320), which belonged to the Counts of Isenburg.

In 1371, Herschbach was conquered by Kuno II of Falkenstein, Archbishop of Trier.

Herschbach was mostly spared the Thirty Years' War’s ravages, but the villages of Überherschbach and Dorfborn, even to the Oberherschbach chapel, were destroyed so that their inhabitants would seek and find refuge in the fortified community of Herschbach. Today’s streets, Obertor and Untertor (meaning “Upper Gate” and “Lower Gate”), give some idea of the community's dimensions at that time. The castle within its moat fostered handicrafts.

An especially important era in Herschbach's economic history is said to be the quartzite mining. When the Siershahn-Altenkirchen railway line opened in 1884, it also opened new perspectives on mining the valuable freshwater quartzite (also known as quartzarenitic sandstone, Skršin-type quartzite, Limnic quartzite, or by its German name, Süßwasserquarzit), since there was favourable transport at hand. With the opening of the Kleinbahn Selters–Hachenburg, a narrow-gauge railway whose head office was in Herschbach, began the planned mining in Herschbach's, Rückeroth’s, Freirachdorf’s and Marienrachdorf’s municipal areas in 1900. With the further upswing in the iron industry’s development, “Herschbach quartzite” became one of the most sought-after raw materials for this industry in need of fireproof materials. Quartzite mining was for many years the community's main livelihood. In 1939, 625 workers from Herschbach and the neighbouring communities were employed at the quarries. In the 1950s, quartzite mining was shut down because the waning yields from the quartzite lode made recovery economically unjustifiable. What is left over from the “quartzite boom” is a far-reaching change in the look of the local landscape due to tailing heaps, some of which are today overgrown with low forest. Many abandoned pits are used as fishponds. Unusable land, decayed loading ramps and impassable lands still recall the Herschbach Quartzite Basin. The closure also had great consequences for the narrow-gauge railway, whose tracks were torn up by 1960.

After quartzite mining ended, the community administration set about getting other industries to locate in the community, at which they had success. Deutz AG, for instance, opened a parts factory in Herschbach.

In the course of municipal restructuring, Herschbach and 20 other communities joined in 1972 into the Verbandsgemeinde of Selters.

== Population ==
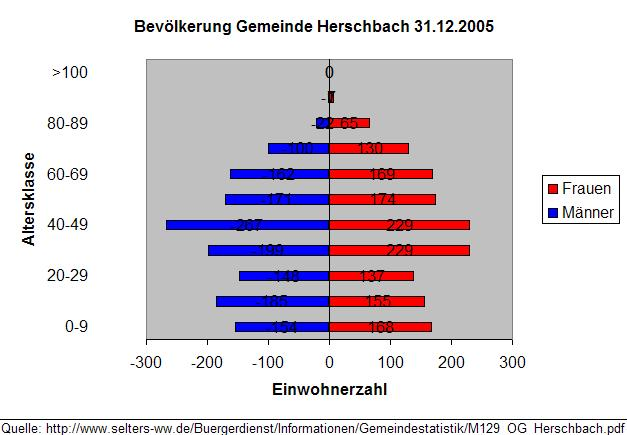
Share of population by age

On 30 June 2007, the population figures showed that there were 2,899 people whose primary residence was in the community, and another 112 who maintained a secondary residence here, for a total of 3,011. Of these, 49.5% were male and 50.5% female. The share of the population represented by foreigners was 8.4%, mostly inhabitants of Turkish origin. The biggest age group is 40- to 49-year-olds.

The greater part of the population belongs to the Christian faith; 56.3% are Catholic and 19.4% are Evangelical. Those without a faith number 12.8%. The rest are mostly Muslims.

As for family relationships, 38.2% are single, 46.8% married, 6.1% widowed and 6.6% divorced.

=== Population development ===
Population development over the years runs as follows (counting only those with primary residence):

Year	1815	1871	1939	1950	1965	1975	1985	1990	1995	1999	2001	2003	2005	2006
Population	888	1009	1476	1545	1845	2221	2330	2425	2605	2764	2843	2912	2872	2882

== Politics ==
=== Community council ===
The council is made up of 20 council members, as well as the honorary and presiding mayor (Ortsbürgermeister), who were elected in a municipal election on 7 June 2009.

Seat apportionment on elected council:

	SPD	CDU	FLH	Total
2004	3	11	6	20 seats

FLH (Freie Liste Herschbach)

=== Coat of arms ===

The community's arms show Saint Lawrence of Rome, who is Herschbach's patron saint. He is shown with a grill, on which he was tortured and martyred. The arms have a red-silver background.

=== Town partnerships ===
- Pleudihen-sur-Rance, France, since September 1979

In December 1978, a delegation from Pleudihen-sur-Rance visited the community of Herschbach. In May 1979, this was reciprocated by a delegation from Herschbach to Pleudihen-sur-Rance to seal the partnership.

In September 1979, the official partnership celebration was held in Herschbach. In an extraordinary council session, the partnership documents were signed by the then mayors Dr. E. Playoust and Franz Beuler.

In 1981, under Günter Beuler's and Ulrike Pfeifer's supervision, the first student and youth exchanges took place. These have been held yearly since then.

On 25 January 2001, 25 friends of the partnership met to form a club. The club supports the community's partnership board and introduces new ideas to overcome people's skepticism over the partnership between the Breton community of Pleudihen-sur-Rance and Herschbach. The youth work, however, is the club's uppermost priority, for “Youth is the guarantor for the partnership’s continuance and thereby also for peace in Europe,” as the former club chairman once said.

Jubilees are celebrated in each community every five years, once in Pleudihen, and then a year later in Herschbach.

== Culture and sightseeing ==
=== Buildings ===
Convent

The Marienheim Convent was built on the foundations of the moated castle Arx Hergispach. In 1903 the first Dernbach sisters moved in. Today it houses a home for the aged for sisters of the Order of the Poor Serving Maids of Jesus Christ. In 1995, the Marienheim Convent celebrated its 100th anniversary.

St. Anna parish church

On the site of the chapel known as St. Anna since 1486 and so consecrated in 1664, court master builder Johannes Seiz built today's Baroque parish church between 1765 and 1768, which was consecrated by Archbishop and Elector of Trier Clemens Wenzeslaus von Sachsen. Johann Wilhelm Schöler built his great organ works in 1773 and 1774 for the Herschbach parish church. The organ looks the same today as it did then. The St. Anna parish church is a protected monument, and along with the historic town hall and the remodelled marketplace, forms the heart of Herschbach.

Evangelical parish house

The Evangelical parish of Andreas only had a church built in 1989, as until the Second World War was over, Herschbach was almost exclusively Catholic.

Laurentius-Kapelle

As well, there is the Laurentius-Kapelle (chapel) in the graveyard at Oberherschbach, which was already mentioned in 1487, but from its early Gothic architecture, it may well be about a thousand years old. The Laurentius-Kapelle in Oberherschbach is a pilgrimage destination. In May, pilgrimages to the Dolorous Mother of God take place.

Haus Hergispach festival hall

The community of Herschbach had this built in the early 1980s. It has a seating capacity of roughly 1,000 and is used for events of all kinds.

Historic Town Hall

Herschbach's town hall was formerly an elementary school and was later converted into a town hall. It was renovated in the mid-1990s. It forms, with the parish church and the marketplace, the community's historic heart.

=== Music ===
In Herschbach there are a music club, a band, a men's singing club, a singing club and a church choir who take part in festivals and church services and stage concerts.

=== Sport and leisure ===
Herschbach has at its disposal a sporting ground (hard-surface), tennis courts (hard-surface), an outdoor swimming pool, a fitness path, a campground, a skating rink, a discotheque and also some hiking trails in the surrounding woods, parts of which belong to the Westerwald Nordic Walking Park.

== Regular events ==
- Herrensitzung der Närrischen Ritter (Gentlemen's session of the “Clownish Knights”)
- Local Carnival (Shrovetide)
- Carnival company's gala session
- Carnival company's children's session
- Rosenmontagszug (Shrove Monday parade)
- Princes’ ball
- Möhnensitzung des Möhnenvereins (“Clownish Women’s” session)
- Großer Bunter Abend des Spielmannszuges (“Band’s Great Colourful Evening”)
- Ball der Schautänze (exhibition dance ball)
- Music club's gala concert
- Frühjahrsmarkt (“Early-year Market”)
- Große Zeltkirmes (“Great Tent Kermis”)
- Rot-Weiße Rocknacht (“Red-White Rock Night”)
- Parish festival
- Autumn market
- Martinsfeier
- Prinzenproklamation (“Princes’ proclamation”)
- Nostalgic Christmas market

=== Clubs and groups ===
- Amazonen-Tanzgruppe Herschbach (Amazon Dance Troupe)
- Brieftaubenzuchtverein "Auf zum Westerwald" (carrier pigeon raising)
- Deutsches Rotes Kreuz-Ortsverein Herschbach (German Red Cross)
- Förder- und Freundschaftskreis Herschbach-Pleudihen (Herschbach-Pleudihen promotional and friendship circle)
- Freiwillige Feuerwehr Herschbach (volunteer fire brigade)
- Frohe Sänger Westerwald (singing club)
- Kaninchenzuchtverein RN 65 Herschbach/Schenkelberg (rabbit raising)
- Karnevalsgesellschaft 1912 Herschbach e.V. (Carnival company)
- Kath. Frauengemeinschaft Deutschlands 1981 Herschbach (Catholic Women's Community of Germany)
- Kirchenchor 1881 "Cäcilia" Herschbach (church choir)
- Kolpingsfamilie Herschbach
- Kur- und Verkehrsverein Herschbach
- Männergesangsverein 1904 "Frohsinn" Herschbach e.V. (men's singing club)
- Möhnenverein "Fidelio" Herschbach e.V. (“Clownish Women”)
- Musikverein Herschbach e.V. (music club)
- Närrische Ritter Westerwald e.V. (“Clownish Knights”)
- Prinzenstammtisch 1987 (Princes’ regulars table)
- Pyramidenschieber Herschbach
- Spielgemeinschaft Herschbach/Schenkelberg e.V. (Sportverein 1920 Herschbach) (sport club)
- Spielmannszug Herschbach e.V. (band)
- Tanz-Sport-Gemeinschaft Westerwald-Mittelrhein e.V. (dancing and sport)
- Tennisclub Blau Weiß Herschbach 1978 e.V.
- Tischtennisclub Herschbach (table tennis)
- VDK Ortsgruppe Herschbach

=== Carnival ===
A notable highlight in Herschbach's club life is the Herschbach Carnival. Even if the Carnival Company (Karnevalsgesellschaft, KG) was founded “only” in 1912, stories of earlier carnivals are known. The KG and the Möhnenverein (see above) are among the clubs with the highest memberships in Herschbach. In the run-up to Rosenmontag (Shrove Monday), some 7 Carnival events are held (such as the “sessions” mentioned above), each of which draws some 400 to 1,000 visitors to the festival hall. The yearly Rosenmontagszug (parade) with its more than 2,000 contributors and 15,000 visitors one of the biggest in the region, which has won Herschbach the title of “the” local Carnival stronghold. For all of this, the KG maintains its own float building hall in which the parade floats are built. A peculiarity here is the use of home-crafted paper roses used to adorn the floats, thereby doing the Rosenmontagszug literally every honour. On the “princes’ float” in 2006, for instance, 20,000 roses were used

== Economy and infrastructure ==
=== Transport ===
Herschbach lies on Bundesstraße 413 to which it is linked by 3 interchanges. Relatively nearby is Bundesstraße 8. Herschbach lies near the Autobahnen A 3 and A 48 between Cologne, Frankfurt and Koblenz. The nearest Autobahn interchanges are near Mogendorf (12 km) and Dierdorf (10 km). The mittlerweile verworfene planning for an extension to the A 48 towards Siegen (Westerwaldautobahn) would have had the highway running east of the village north–south between Herschbach and Schenkelberg. Landesstraße 292 runs through the community, and Landesstraße 305 is linked to the community by two interchanges.

Herschbach had a station on the Selters-Hachenburg narrow gauge railway which has been closed and most of its tracks deconstructed.

The nearest InterCityExpress stop is the railway station at Montabaur on the Cologne-Frankfurt high-speed rail line. Further long-distance railway stations nearby are found in Koblenz, Neuwied and Ingelbach.

=== Education ===
- Katholische Kindertagesstätte St. Anna (Catholic daycare)
- Catholic public library
- Herschbach primary school

Secondary schools are found in Dierdorf (Gymnasium, Realschule) and Selters (Regionalschule).

=== Munitions depot ===
In the 1980s, the Bundeswehr built a bunker area on Bundesstraße 8, which was abandoned a short time later. Today, the many bunkers may be rented.

=== Windfarm ===
In the summer of 2006, 12 Enercon E-70 wind turbines were put up at the Hartenfelser Kopf Windfarm. These supply roughly 12,500 households and reduce CO_{2} emissions by 28,500 metric tons each year. The windfarm is one of the biggest such projects in a forest that has ever been built in the Federal Republic.

Two of the wind turbines stand in Herschbach's municipal area.
