= Pleudihen-sur-Rance =

Pleudihen-sur-Rance Pleudehen
- Commune
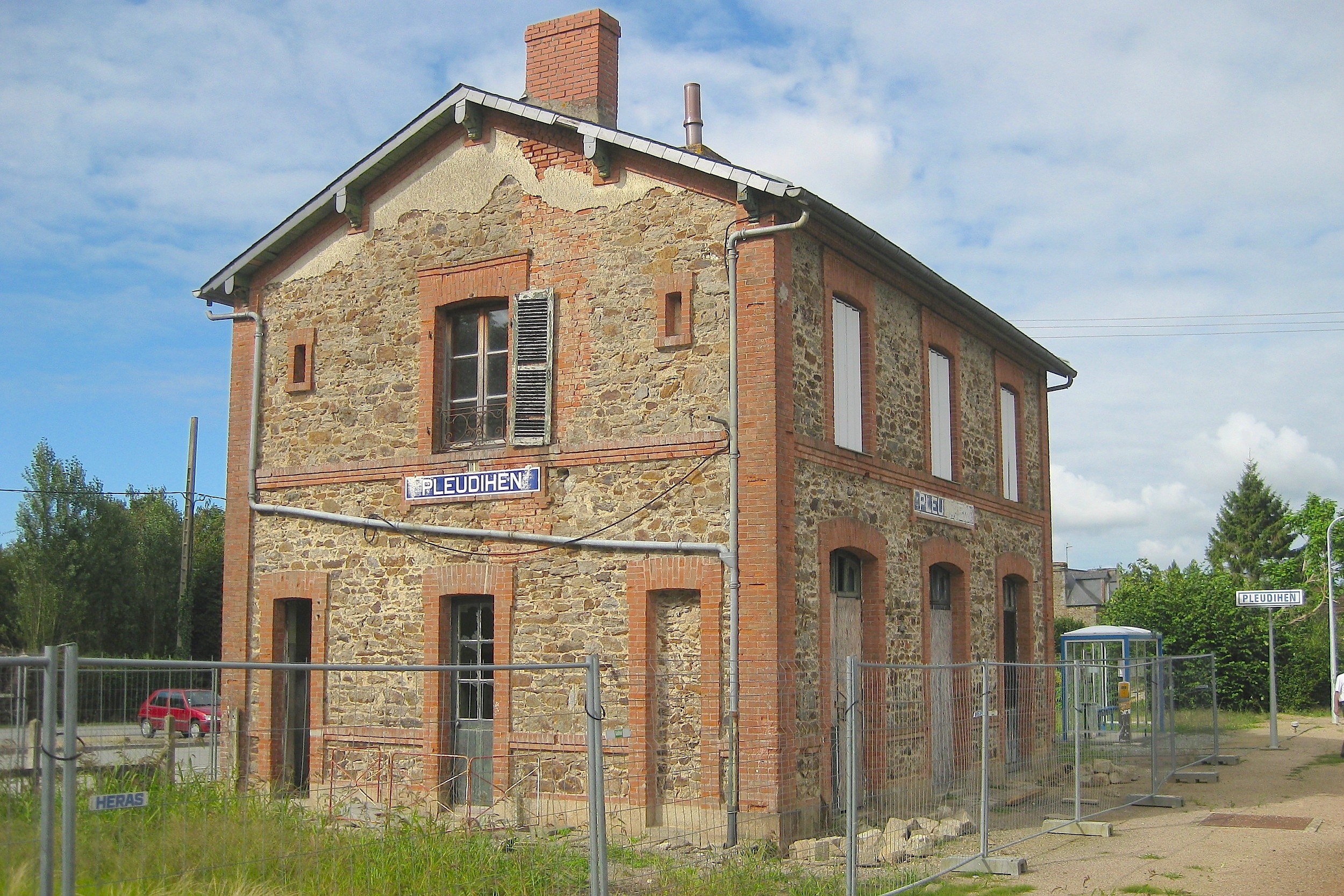
- Train station

- Coat of arms
- Location of Pleudihen-sur-Rance
- Location within France Location within Brittany
- Coordinates: 48°30′42″N 1°57′02″W
- Country: France
- Region: Brittany
- Department: Côtes-d'Armor
- Arrondissement: Dinan
- Canton: Lanvallay
- Intercommunality: Dinan Agglomération

Government
  - Mayor (2020–2026): David Boixière
- Area^{1}: 24.55 km^{2} (9.48 sq mi)
- Highest elevation: 63 m (207 ft)
- Lowest elevation: 0 m (0 ft)
- Population (2023): 2,924
  - Density: 119.1/km^{2} (308.5/sq mi)
- Time zone: UTC+01:00 (CET)
  - Summer (DST): UTC+02:00 (CEST)
- INSEE/Postal code: 22197 /22690
- ^{1} French Land Register data, which excludes lakes, ponds, glaciers > 1 km^{2} (0.386 sq mi or 247 acres) and river estuaries.

Pleudihen-sur-Rance (French pronunciation: [plødi.ɛ̃ syʁ ʁɑ̃s], literally Pleudihen on Rance; Breton: Pleudehen) is a commune in the Côtes-d'Armor department of Brittany in northwestern France.

It is known for the production of apples and Breton champagne (cider).

During the latter half of the 18th century, the town took in a large share of 2,000 Acadians who were deported to France against their will.

== Geography ==
Located only a couple of miles from the Rance, Pleudihen-sur-Rance is accessible via the D29 that goes to La Vicomté-sur-Rance to the south (4 miles) and Châteauneuf-d'Ille-et-Vilaine (8 miles) to the north.

== Population ==
Inhabitants of Pleudihen-sur-Rance are called pleudihennais in French.

Historical population
Year	Pop.	±% p.a.
1968	2,318	—
1975	2,351	+0.20%
1982	2,461	+0.66%
1990	2,495	+0.17%
1999	2,516	+0.09%
2007	2,746	+1.10%
2012	2,809	+0.45%
2017	2,909	+0.70%
2023	2,924	+0.09%
Source: INSEE

== Attractions ==
The Musée de la Pomme et du Cidre (The Apple and Cider Museum), located in a farmhouse within town, is a prominent attraction, displaying various types of apple trees, production methods, and offers cider tasting.

== Partnership ==
Pleudihen-sur-Rance maintains a town partnership with the German community of Herschbach in the Westerwaldkreis, Rhineland-Palatinate.

== See also ==
- Communes of the Côtes-d'Armor department
