= Mündersbach =

- Municipality
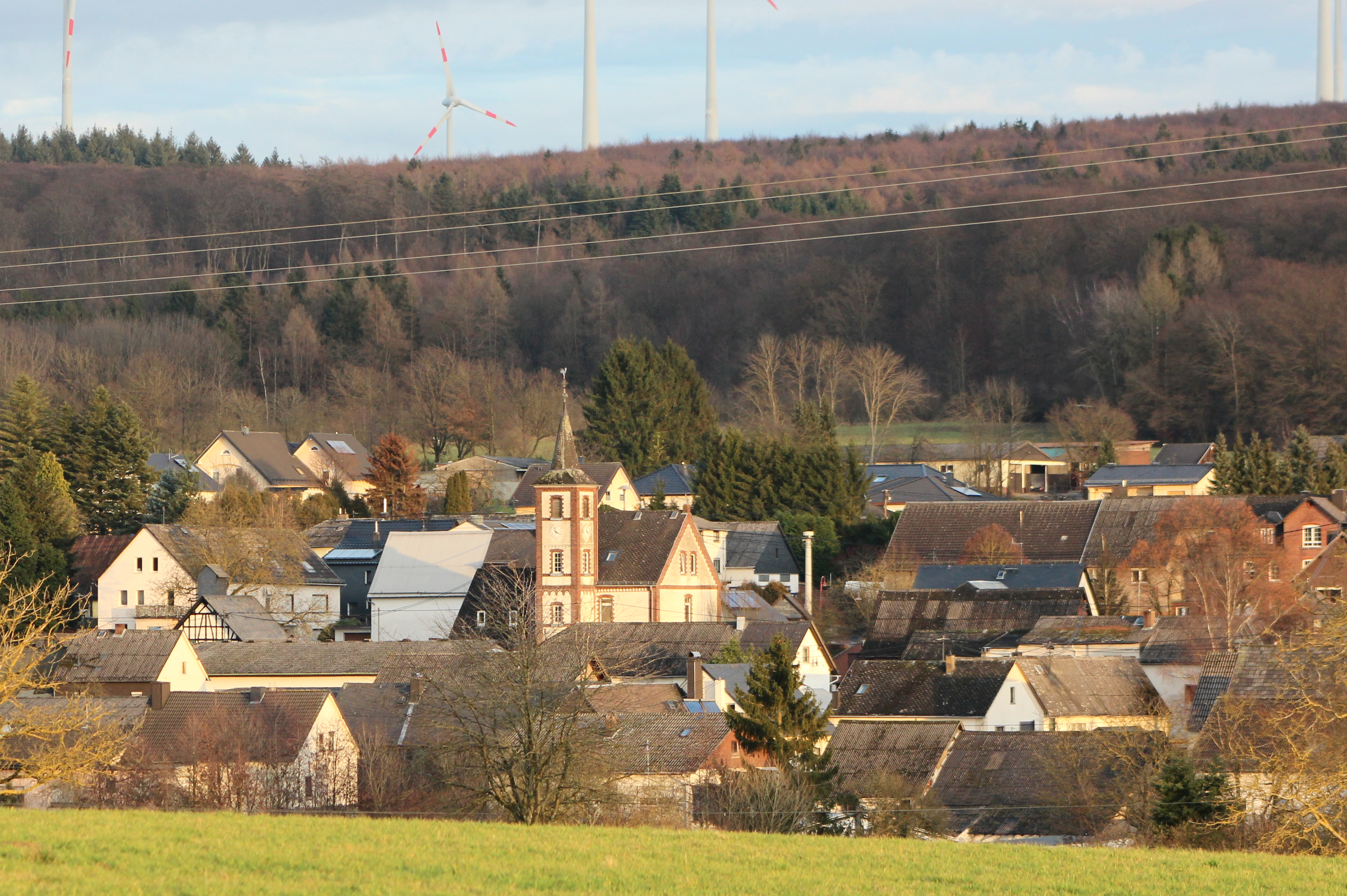

- Coat of arms

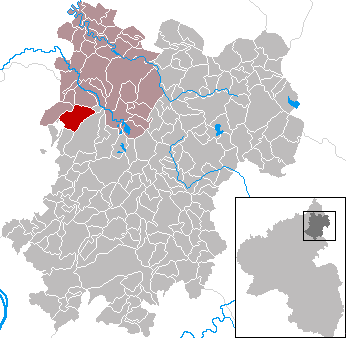
- Location of Mündersbach within Westerwaldkreis district
- Interactive map of Mündersbach
- Location within Germany Location within Rhineland-Palatinate
- Coordinates: 50°36′23″N 7°44′3″E
- Country: Germany
- State: Rhineland-Palatinate
- District: Westerwaldkreis
- Municipal assoc.: Hachenburg

Government
  - Mayor (2019–24): Helmut Kempf

Area
  - Total: 9.27 km^{2} (3.58 sq mi)
- Elevation: 310 m (1,020 ft)

Population (2025-12-31)
  - Total: 787
  - Density: 84.9/km^{2} (220/sq mi)
- Time zone: UTC+01:00 (CET)
  - Summer (DST): UTC+02:00 (CEST)
- Postal codes: 56271
- Dialling codes: 02680
- Vehicle registration: WW
- Website: www.muendersbach.de

Mündersbach is an Ortsgemeinde – a community belonging to a Verbandsgemeinde – in the Westerwaldkreis in Rhineland-Palatinate, Germany.

== Geography ==
The community lies between Hachenburg and Herschbach. The residential community of Mündersbach belongs to the Verbandsgemeinde of Hachenburg, a kind of collective municipality. Its seat is in the like-named town.

== History ==
In 1247, Mündersbach had its first documentary mention.

== Politics ==
The municipal council is made up of 13 council members, including the extraofficial mayor (Bürgermeister), who were elected in a majority vote in a municipal election on 13 June 2004.

== Economy and infrastructure ==
=== Transport ===
The community lies directly on Bundesstraße 413 from Bendorf to Hachenburg. The nearest Autobahn interchanges are in Dierdorf, Neuwied and Ransbach-Baumbach on the A 3 (Cologne–Frankfurt), each some 15 km away.

The Selters-Hachenburg narrow gauge railway had a stop in Mündersbach, but the line has been closed and most of its infrastructure deconstructed.

The local bus lines 415, 417, 420 and 439 connect the village to the public transport, it is located in the fare zone number 437 of the transport association Verkehrsverbund Rhein-Mosel (VRM).

The nearest accessabilities to the train service are the Hattert stop and the Hachenburg station at the Limburg-Altenkirchen railway (RB90), next InterCityExpress stop is the Montabaur station on the Cologne-Frankfurt high-speed rail line.

=== Public institutions ===
The community has at its disposal a floodlit sporting ground and a tennis court with three places. The village's children can enjoy themselves at public playing fields and playgrounds. There is also a community house (multipurpose hall) in Mündersbach with a modern kindergarten as well as a community bakehouse with a long baking tradition.

=== Wind park ===
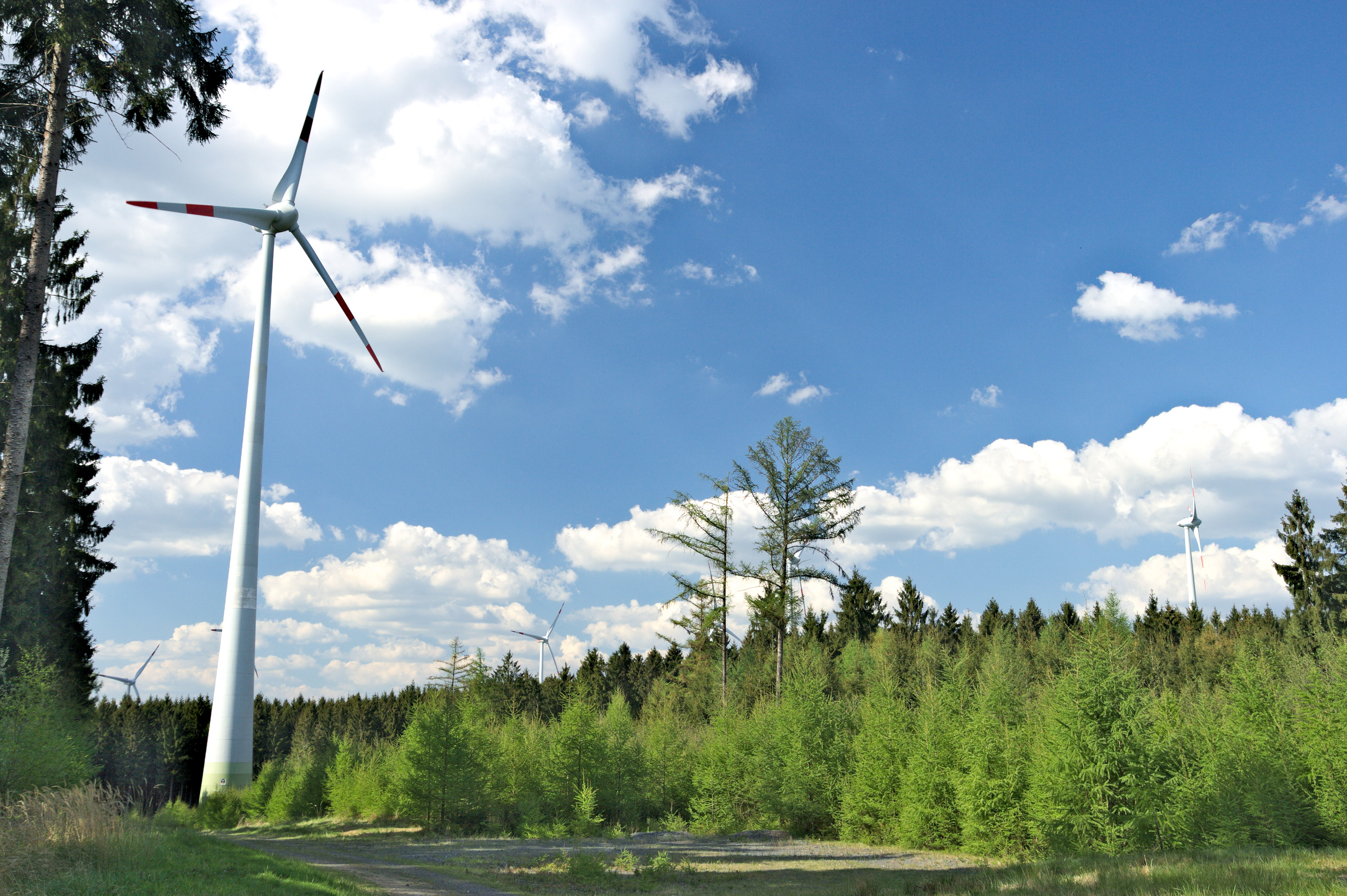
Wind park Hartenfelser Kopf

The Wind park Hartenfelser Kopf is located in the area of Höchstenbach and Mündersbach.
